= Parasect =

Pokémon species

- Pokémon character
- Parasect artwork by Ken Sugimori
- First game: Pokémon Red and Blue (1996)
- Designed by: Ken Sugimori

In-universe information
- Species: Pokémon
- Type: Bug and Grass

Parasect (/ˈpɛrəsɛkt/; Japanese: パラセクト) is a Pokémon species in Nintendo and Game Freak's Pokémon media franchise, and the evolved form of Paras. First introduced in the video games Pokémon Red and Blue, it has since appeared in multiple games including Pokémon Go and the Pokémon Trading Card Game, as well as various merchandise. It is classified as both a Bug and Grass-type Pokémon.

== Conception and development ==
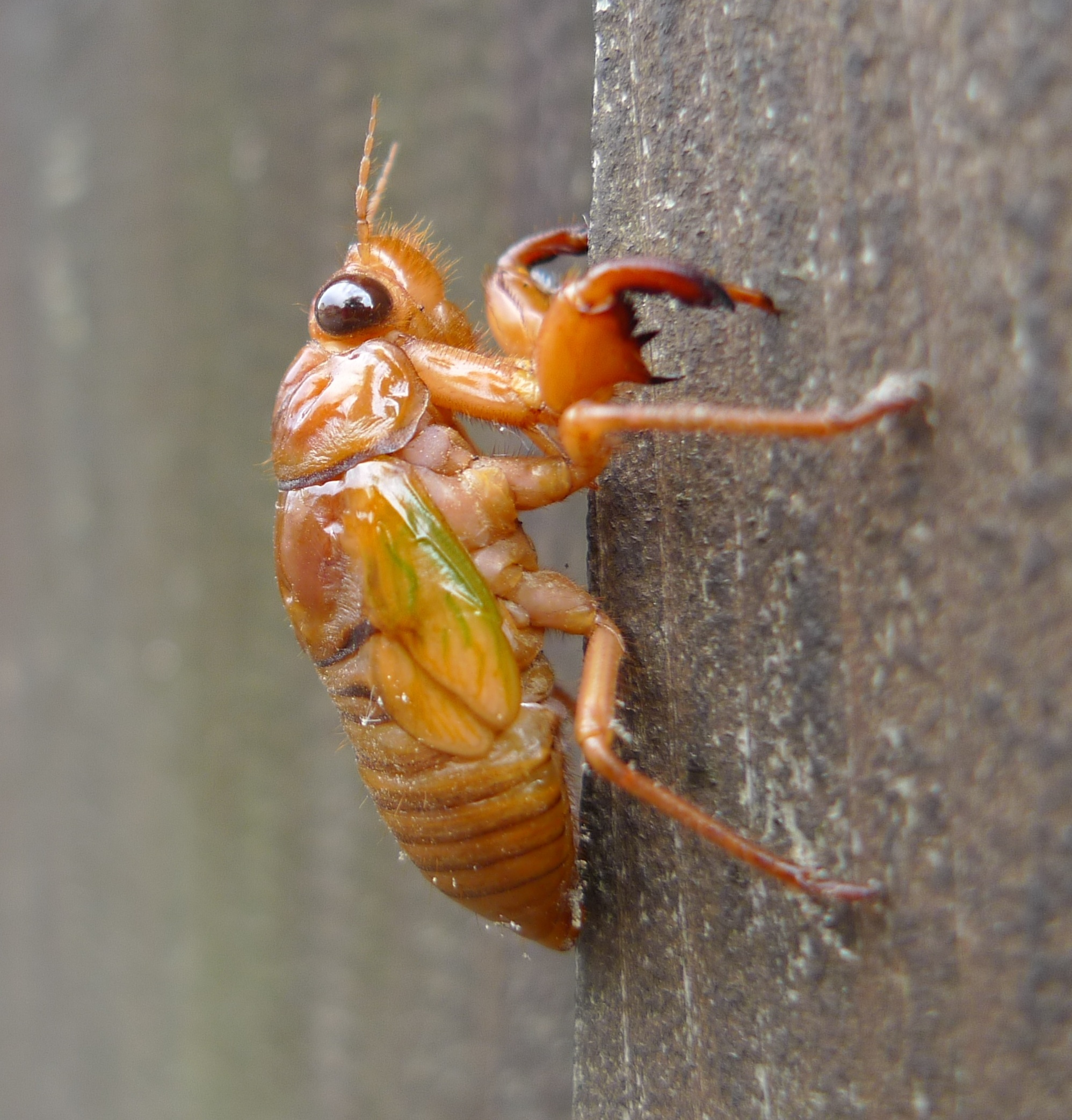
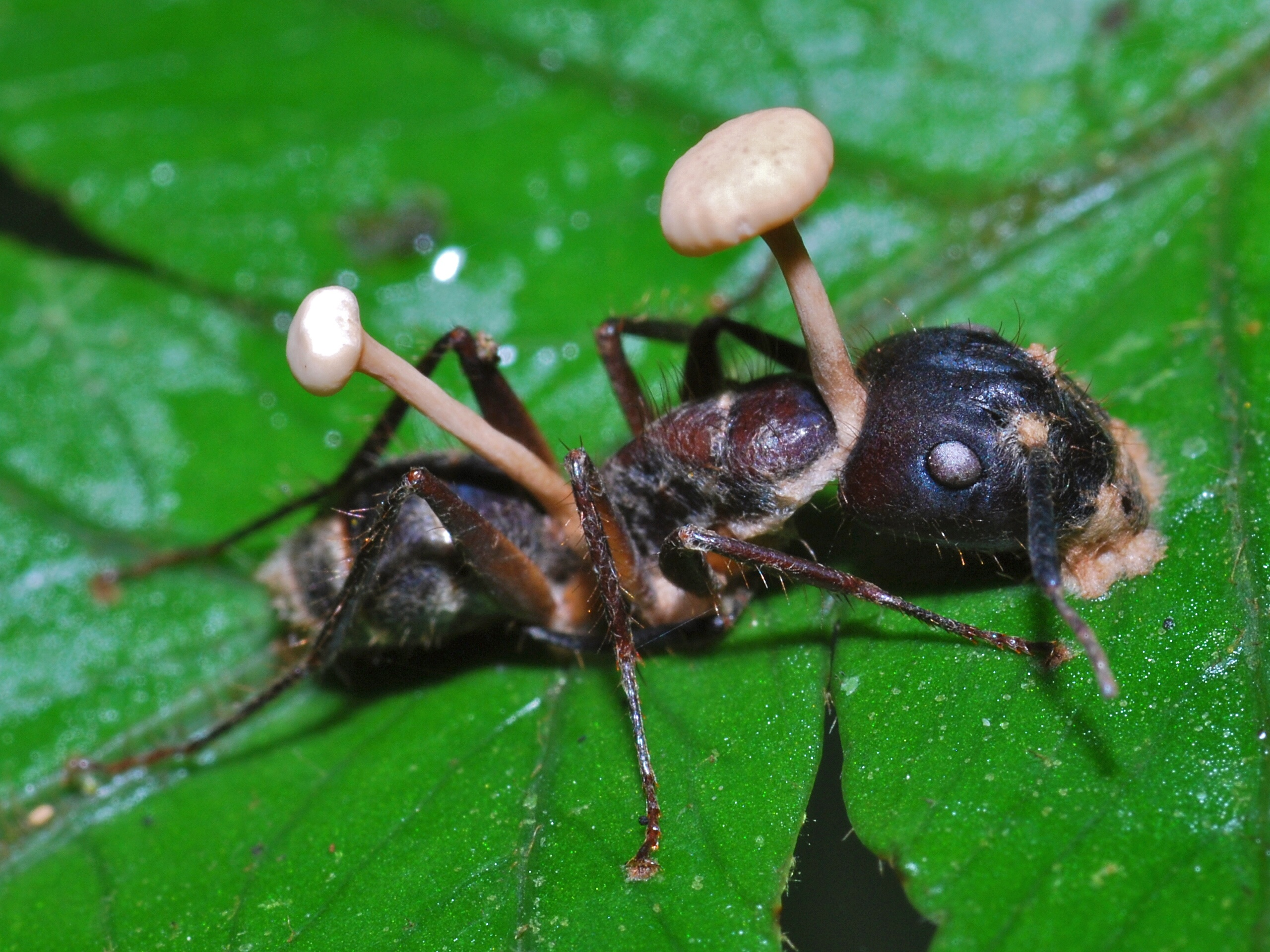
From left to right: Paras and Parasect's host is based on a cicada nymph, whilst the mushroom on their back is primarily based on the Ophiocordyceps sinensis, but is also believed to be based on Cordyceps fungi.

Parasect is a species of fictional creatures called Pokémon created for the Pokémon media franchise. Developed by Game Freak and published by Nintendo, the Japanese franchise began in 1996 with the video games Pokémon Red and Green for the Game Boy, which were later released in North America as Pokémon Red and Blue in 1998. In these games and their sequels, the player assumes the role of a Trainer whose goal is to capture and use the creatures' special abilities to combat other Pokémon. Some Pokémon can transform into stronger species through a process called evolution via various means, such as exposure to specific items. Each Pokémon have one or two elemental types, which define its advantages and disadvantages when battling other Pokémon. A major goal in each game is to complete the Pokédex, a comprehensive Pokémon encyclopedia, by capturing, evolving, and trading with other Trainers to obtain individuals from all Pokémon species.

When making the games, the design first started as pixel art sprites by the development team, created with a single color identity chosen to work within the Super Game Boy hardware limitations. Once development was complete, Ken Sugimori re-drew the species along with the others in his own artstyle in order to give the game a unified look and finalize any design elements, while also trying to maintain the original artist's unique style.

Parasect evolves from Paras, also a Bug and Grass-type Pokémon. Paras is orange with an ovoid body with a pair of red-and-yellow tōchūkasō, a parasitic mushroom that over time replaces the tissue of the host body and can affect the host's behavior. These mushrooms grow from spores spread on it by its parent. Paras itself is based on a cicada nymph. Parasect has a similarly orange body, with a large tōchūkasō mushroom having formed on its back. Parasect, drained of its nutrients, has become fully controlled by the tōchūkasō. It often can be found in dank areas hospitable to fungi growth. Other species of fungi have also noted as potential inspiration for Paras and Parasect's mushroom, such as the genus Cordyceps. The mushroom has also been compared to the fungi Ophiocordyceps unilateralis, also known as the "Zombie ant fungus", which can also be found in cicadas. Its eyes are blank and white, described as "zombie-like". If the mushroom is removed, the insect part stops moving. Its name is a combination of "parasite" and "insect". It is capable of releasing spores that create more mushrooms. While most locations in the series are fictional, the video game Pokémon Stadium claims that its spores are used as medicine in China.

== Appearances ==
First found in Pokémon Red and Blue, where it can either be obtained by evolving from Paras via level up or in the wild, such as in the Safari Zone. Parasect has appeared in most Pokémon titles since, until being absent from the 2019 titles Pokémon Sword and Shield. It was later featured in Pokémon Legends: Arceus in 2021, where a large, more powerful version called an "Alpha Pokémon" can be seen surrounded by Paras and will attack the player on sight. It was once again excluded from the mainline series with the release of Pokémon Scarlet and Violet. Outside of these games, it has appeared in the mobile game Pokémon Go and, in physical media, the Pokémon Trading Card Game.

== Critical reception ==
Parasect has been regarded as a particularly frightening Pokémon, with Nintendojo writer Joseph Nelson discussing how while Paras appears to have a symbiotic relationship with the mushrooms, Parasect shows that it is a parasitic situation due to Parasect being "essentially braindead." They suggested that they were based on the Ophiocordyceps sinensis. The Mary Sue writer Sarah Fimm found Parasect ugly due to a combination of it being a bug and the creepiness of it being a reanimated corpse. Multiple writers have compared it to the Clickers from The Last of Us. Game Rant writer Megan Elisabeth Gingerich believed that the use of a tōchūkasō mushroom created a stronger connection between the two, also stating that Parasect, like the Clickers, have their vision affected by the infection and release spores. Its appearance, alongside Paras', in Pokémon Pokopia, was considered "heartbreaking" by the editorial department of the website Magmix, particularly with Paras expressing excitement for evolving. Kotaku writer Brian Ashcraft felt that it was among the most unsettling Pokémon species due to its situation and expression. He felt that the expression enhanced the creepiness, and that if the eyes had pupils, it would look cute.

Nintendo Life staff found the lore surrounding Parasect interesting, finding it both unique and terrifying. While discussing both its and Paras' Bug/Grass type, Alex Olney stated that this typing was a weak one due to having a particularly high number of weaknesses. As part of their "Pokémon of the Day" series, a writer for IGN identified its typing as the worst as far as weaknesses go, expressing disappointment that Paras' blue eyes are replaced by blank white eyes. She felt that it was not particularly useful competitively, but was useful for catching other Pokémon due to having the technique "Spore". TheGamer writer Stacey Henley felt that Parasect was an overlooked Pokémon in several ways; on its Paras form, she believed that it was neither hated like Mr. Mime or Jynx, nor uninteresting, like Voltorb or Spearow. She also believed that Paras suffered when compared to other Grass types the player could find around the same time, including Bellsprout and Oddish, stating that its design was comparatively dull. She argued that these issues with Paras are what cause people to overlook Parasect. Commenting on the evolution, she felt that it seemed like a "natural" evolution, stating that it goes from a "little crab thing to a big crab thing", but that the evolution is actually unnatural. She compared Parasect's design to one found in the art of Junji Ito. Henley felt that it was one of the best Pokémon in the series, owing to both its design and story, which she praises for not relying on a Dark or Ghost typing.

Alpha Parasect's appearance in Pokémon Legends: Arceus was a particularly frightening encounter, with TheGamer writer Josh Coulson discussing how his encounter with was a harrowing experience that made him "feel something" from a Pokémon game for the first time in a long time. Screen Rant writer Elizabeth Wilkie believed that this was due to it being a shock to players, who did not realize at that point how powerful Alpha Pokémon could be.
