= Slowpoke =

Pokémon species

- Pokémon character
- Slowpoke (left) and Galarian Slowpoke (right) as they appear in promotional material for Pokémon GO
- First game: Pokémon Red and Blue (1996)
- Designed by: Ken Sugimori

In-universe information
- Species: Pokémon
- Type: Water and Psychic; Psychic (Galarian)

Slowpoke (/ˈsloʊpoʊk/), known in Japan as Yadon (ヤドン), is a Pokémon species in Nintendo and Game Freak's Pokémon media franchise. Designed by Ken Sugimori, Slowpoke is a Water and Psychic-type Pokémon that debuted in the video games Pokémon Red and Blue and appeared in subsequent mainline titles. They have alternate evolutionary lines in Slowbro and Slowking, although the latter was introduced in the later Pokémon Gold and Silver titles. A regional variant called Galarian Slowpoke, purely Psychic in typing, was introduced in The Isle of Armor downloadable content pack for Pokémon Sword and Shield and evolves into separate variants of Slowbro and Slowking, both of which are Poison and Psychic-type.

Slowpoke, as the name suggests, is a slow, sluggish, and presumably unintelligent Pokémon. They overall resemble a cross-hybrid between a salamander and a hippopotamus and appear thick in body build. Pokédex entries suggest that they are an inactive Pokémon that have delayed reactions to pain, it can take up to five seconds to feel if someone steps on its tail. It states the belief that rainfall can be summoned by the species' yawning. In the Pokémon world, Slowpoke tails are delicacies, and they are thought to often break off naturally and regrow afterward. In-game, Slowpoke are harvested for their tails by an antagonistic faction called Team Rocket for profits in the Pokémon Gold and Silver titles and their remakes, but later games have normalized Slowpoke tails as delicacy items.

Slowpoke is a popular Pokémon for promotions under The Pokémon Company, as it comes in various forms of Japanese merchandise and is the featured Pokémon for a reggae-style song with a 2014 Japanese version and a 2015 English version, the latter of which is called "The Slowpoke Song". Most notably, it is officially the "ambassador Pokémon" for the Kagawa Prefecture of Japan since 2018 in reference to a pun between the "Yadon" name and the udon noodles as well as its rumored ability to bring rainfall since the region suffers from droughts. Within the Kagawa Prefecture, it has been the subject of several April Fool's Day jokes, is celebrated on August 10 under Slowpoke Day, and is prominently featured in many goods and services within the area. Slowpoke has received generally positive receptions for its "charming" nature and comedic elements and is a popular subject within internet culture.

== Design and characteristics ==
Slowpoke is a species of fictional creatures called Pokémon created for the Pokémon media franchise. Developed by Game Freak and published by Nintendo, the Japanese franchise began in 1996 with the video games Pokémon Red and Green for the Game Boy, which were later released in North America as Pokémon Red and Blue in 1998. In these games and their sequels, the player assumes the role of a Trainer whose goal is to capture and use the creatures' special abilities to combat other Pokémon. Some Pokémon can transform into stronger species through a process called evolution via various means, such as exposure to specific items. Each Pokémon has one or two elemental types, which define its advantages and disadvantages when battling other Pokémon. A major goal in each game is to complete the Pokédex, a comprehensive Pokémon encyclopedia, by capturing, evolving, and trading with other Trainers to obtain individuals from all Pokémon species.

Slowpoke was one of 151 different generation I Pokémon designs conceived by Game Freak's character development team and finalized by Ken Sugimori for the first-generation of Pocket Monsters games Red and Green, which were localized outside Japan as Pokémon Red and Blue. The Pokémon concept designer Ken Sugimori confirmed that Slowpoke was one of the Pokémon species that he created along with Clefairy and Lapras, noting that the three species share the spiral ear patterns typically cited as amongst his classic design motifs.

A Shellder biting a Slowpoke's tail, as seen in the Pokémon anime. This process is how Slowpoke evolve in the franchise's lore.

Slowpoke is a Water and Psychic-type Pokémon. It was originally named "Slowmo". Its current name simply refers to the general nature of the species. Slowbro, also present in the Pokémon Red, Blue, and Yellow titles, was the sole evolution of Slowpoke via gaining enough experience until the introduction of Slowking as an alternative evolution of Slowpoke since Pokémon Gold and Silver by trading it to other cartridges or consoles while it holds the "King's Rock" item. The two evolutions differ from Slowpoke in part by the presence of a Shellder that latches to the tail in the case of Slowbro or the head in the case of Slowking. In series lore, Slowpoke evolve when bitten by the Pokémon Shellder, though Shellder are not needed to evolve Slowpoke in the mainline games despite their presence in its evolutions. Slowpoke resembles a hybrid of a salamander and a hippopotamus. Its body is thick in build and mostly light pink in color, while the tail's tip is white. Its snout is tan in color and rounded in shape, and its ears are curled. Each of its four legs possesses a single white claw. Its eyes appear to be vacant due to the species never concentrating on anything. Slowpoke's tail is long and narrow, and it is utilized by the Pokémon as a fishing lure. Its tail can break off often and is capable of growing back. It is thought to be dimwitted and can take five seconds to react to pain. Pokédex entries state that it is very slow, inactive, and dopey, making it difficult to tell if it is awake or not. One of the Pokédex entries for Pokémon Ultra Sun and Ultra Moon states the belief that rain starts from a yawning Slowpoke.

The Isle of Armor DLC expansion pack for Pokémon Sword and Shield introduced a regional variant called Galarian Slowpoke, which unlike standard Slowpoke is purely Psychic in typing. It is able to evolve into Galarian Slowbro or Galarian Slowking—both of whom are Poison and Psychic-typed Pokémon—via the usage of special items on the pair. The two evolutions similarly have a Shellder latching on to each of them, the Galarian variant of Slowbro differing from the regular variant by the Shellder biting the arm instead of the tail. Galarian Slowpoke differs from regular Slowpoke by the presence of a golden tint color on both the top of its head and at the tip of its tail. It also has furrowed brows on its forehead. Its appearance is attributed to the species' historic consumption of "Galarica Seeds" within the Galar region, in which the food particles build up within its stomach and cause its appearance to change.

The tails of Slowpoke have sweet and sappy substances that Slowpoke use to lure prey while fishing. The tails are harvested as delicacies and cooking ingredients since they often break off naturally, and Slowpoke individuals can regrow them. In particular, the body parts are dried then cooked in stews within the Alola region. In the Galar region, Slowpoke tails are used as cooking ingredients called "Smoke-Poke Tails" for curry.

== Appearances ==
Slowpoke first appeared in Pokémon Red and Blue and has been included in subsequent mainline titles. Slowpoke can evolve into Slowbro when it gains enough experience points. In the Pokémon Gold and Silver games (as well as their remakes), it was a major Pokémon species for a plotline involving the antagonistic syndicate faction called Team Rocket in the Johto region. More specifically, members of the faction cut off Slowpoke tails in the "Slowpoke Well" of Azalea Town to sell them as delicacies for profit. An old man named Kurt enlists the player character to get Team Rocket out of the town. Since Pokémon Sun and Moon, Slowpoke tails have been revealed to be delicacies for both the Alola and Galar regions. Kotaku writer Ian Walker noted that while Team Rocket's actions of cutting off Slowpoke tails were treated as atrocities, subsequent installments normalize Slowpoke tails as food "without a hint of irony." Gold and Silver also introduced a new evolution for Slowpoke named Slowking, which could be obtained by trading Slowpoke to another player while it held a "King's Rock" item. Slowpoke has also been included in other Pokémon titles, such as Pokémon Sword and Shield, where a new "Regional Variant" exclusive to the games' main location of Galar was introduced, named Galarian Slowpoke. Some Galarian Slowpoke played a role in the plot of the DLC, The Isle of Armor, where a group of unusual speedy Slowpoke needed to be defeated by the player as part of a story quest. It evolves into Galarian Slowbro or Slowking by collecting a certain number of "Galarica Twig" items and having an NPC craft them into an item used for evolution. In the Pokémon Channel game, Slowpoke hosts its own weather forecasting channel, which players have to watch if they wished to change the in-game weather. Slowpoke and its evolutions are also included in Pokémon Go, although the Galarian variants were added later in 2021, with a Slowpoke-themed event called "A Very Slow Discovery" occurring from June 8 to June 13. Galarian Slowpoke later made an appearance in Pokémon Café ReMix.

In the Pokémon anime series, Slowpoke made its debut in the episode Island of the Giant Pokémon of the first season of the TV series known as Pokémon: Indigo League. In it, a Slowpoke appears in the beginning of the episode using its tail as a fishing lure. At the end of the episode, it becomes bipedal and has a Shellder latched onto its tail, having evolved into Slowbro. Slowpoke is the featured Pokémon for the official namesake Japanese reggae-style song "Donai Yanen Yadon," which translates roughly to "How You're a Slowpoke After All" and was released on YouTube in 2014. The lyrics describe the odd appearances and personalities of Slowpoke in a humorous light. The music video is animated and features an ouroboros of multiple Slowpoke individuals. A lyric-free version of the song was made available as a downloadable Nintendo 3DS theme featuring a lounging Slowpoke at a beachside in 2015 at the cost of $1.99. Later in the same year, an English version of the song, called "The Slowpoke Song," was released for the Official Pokémon YouTube Channel. The Slowpoke Song is featured in the Pokémon show episode Splash, Dash, and Smash for the Crown! / Slowking's Crowning! in Pokémon Journeys: The Series when the character Goh encounters multiple Slowpoke individuals on Slowpoke Island.

== Promotion and reception ==
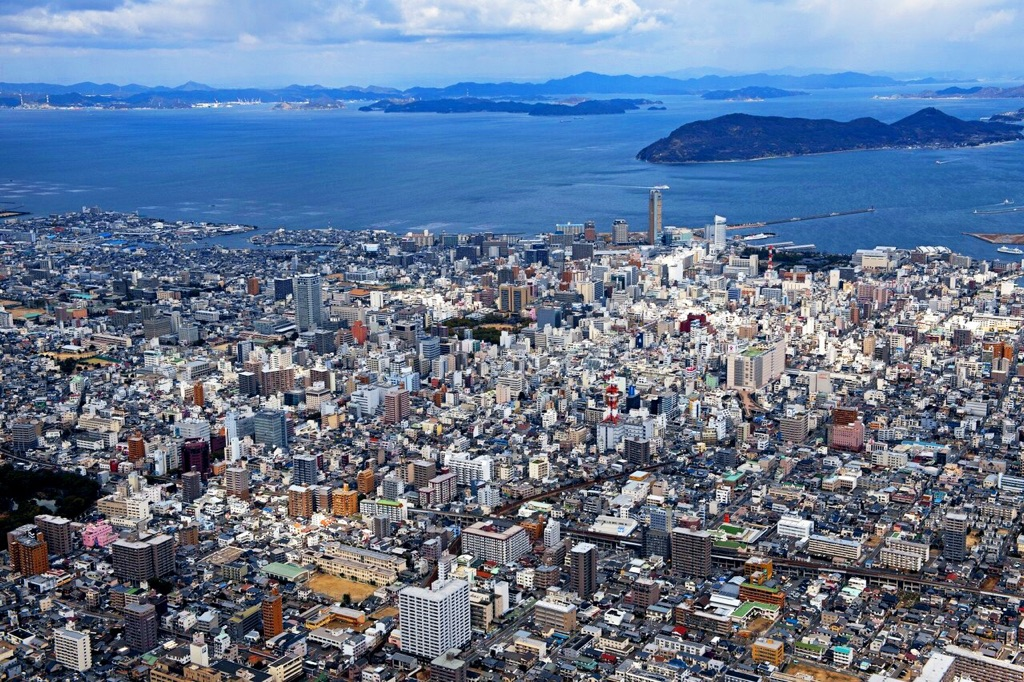
Kagawa Prefecture uses Slowpoke frequently for promotion.

Slowpoke has been used in promotion for the series since its inception. Slowpoke's popularity has resulted in much fan labor surrounding the species, with Game Rant noting that the popularity and longevity of the Pokémon, as well as the unique merchandise surrounding it, have made it a popular figure for fanworks. A life-sized plush of Slowpoke was released in Japan in 2021, and the popularity of the plush led to it being rereleased again in 2023. Other merchandise released relating to the Pokémon includes a sofa based around the Pokémon, as well as various toys, and a computer cushion.

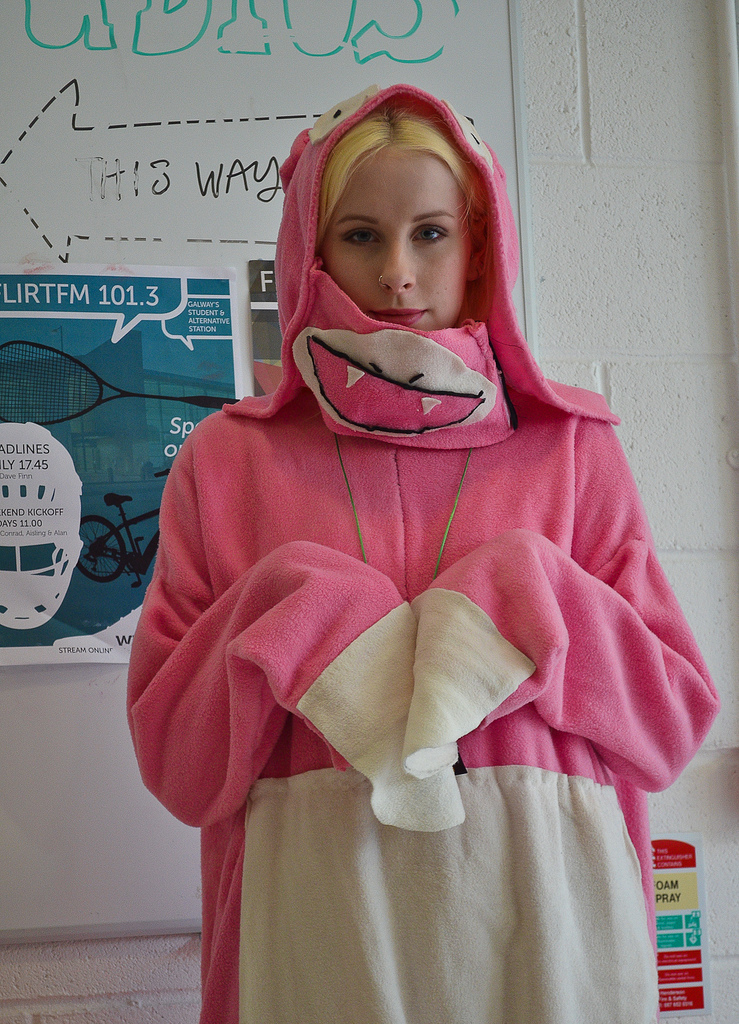
A woman wearing a Slowpoke outfit. Slowpoke has been a popular and enduring Pokémon with fans of the series.

Slowpoke has been used in promotion in the Kagawa Prefecture of Japan, with The Pokémon Company labelling it as a "national tourism ambassador" as part of the "My First Pokemon Project", which seeks to further connections between children and the Pokémon franchise. It was also stated to be part of the "Pokémon Local Acts" initiative, with the goal of beautifying towns and attracting tourism in less visited areas of Japan. Slowpoke was named as the ambassador due to several characteristics of the species, with its Japanese name "Yadon" sounding similarly to "udon", a specialty of the prefecture. Its in-game lore of bringing rains when it yawns was also cited as a reason, due to Kagawa frequently suffering from droughts. Many objects and services in the area, such as mailboxes, taxis, buses and ferries bear Slowpoke designs. Pokefuta manhole covers were also placed throughout the prefecture. A special line of food products based around Slowpoke was released exclusively in the prefecture, which included Sanuki Udon, a local specialty of the prefecture. A park themed around Slowpoke, nicknamed the Slowpoke Park, was unveiled in 2023 in Ayagawa, Kagawa. Kenjiro Ito of The Pokémon Company stated that the goal of the park was to connect children with Slowpoke, and to revitalize the community in the area, and attracted around 100,000 people within the same year, with long lines in front of the Park being noted. Local businesses also collaborated to create a "Slowpoke Paradise" featuring large amounts of the Pokémon around the prefecture. August 10 also serves as "Slowpoke Day" in the prefecture, resulting in large amounts of celebration. Collaborations with local airports were also held to promote the event, and it was also celebrated to celebrate the 30th anniversary of the Great Seto Bridge. As part of an April Fool's joke in 2018, a mascot in a Slowpoke costume took over as the prefecture's governor for the day, and an earlier April Fool's joke in 2015 involved mock news reports detailing how many Slowpoke were researched in order to create rain, only for them to escape.

Since its inception, Slowpoke has been described as a fan favorite Pokémon. It has been noted as a "mainstay" of many projects related to Pokémon due to its popularity, causing frequent reappearances in the games and frequent appearances in promotion for the series. Slowpoke's presence as a tourism ambassador was highlighted as being in part due to its strong fan following, and the various promotional stunts in Kagawa were cited as showing the cultural impact of the Pokémon franchise. It has been described as one of the cutest and most charming Pokémon, with its involvement in the Slowpoke Festival in Kagawa being cited as "enough to at least get a smile out of anyone." An internet meme involving Slowpoke, in a vein similar to the "advice animals" meme, involved an image of Slowpoke with a large caption. The vacant expression of the Pokémon, in conjunction with the often outdated and humorous text, was where humor was derived from the joke. The meme has been cited for its longevity and creative use of the Pokémon, and saw a brief resurgence with an "updated" version using Galarian Slowpoke. Slowpoke and its association with Shellder have also been used as names for the locus chromosomes and a retrotransposon (pasting genetic component), respectively, in studies relating to flies of the genus Drosophila. Slowpoke has also been the subject of fan theories, with some claiming that Slowpoke's slow reaction times are due to Slowpoke being omniscient and unable to comprehend everything the same way as a result. Slowpoke's treatment in the series has been criticized, with Ian Walker of Kotaku criticizing how the species has long been mocked or the result of various sufferings throughout the series, with Paste Magazine responding similarly. Slowpoke has also been highlighted as relatable, with Shiho Raw Yuba noting that they related to the Pokémon to its slow nature echoing how they were in their childhood. Galarian Slowpoke has been noted for many of the likeable qualities of Slowpoke's original design with its own.
