= Pauwau =

Pauwau or Pau wau may refer to:

- Pow wow, a gathering of North American native peoples
- Pauwau, the original Japanese name of Seel (Pokémon), a fictional species of Pokémon
