= Weezing =

Pokémon species

- Pokémon character
- First game: Pokémon Red and Blue
- Designed by: Ken Sugimori (finalized)

In-universe information
- Species: Pokémon
- Type: Poison; Poison and Fairy (Galarian)

Weezing (/ˈwiːzɪŋ/), known in Japan as Matadogas (Japanese: マタドガス), is a Pokémon species in Nintendo and Game Freak's Pokémon franchise. First introduced in the video games Pokémon Red and Blue, it evolves from the Pokémon Koffing, both having the Poison type. Since Weezing's debut, it has appeared in multiple games including Pokémon Go and the Pokémon Trading Card Game, as well as media related to the franchise, including as a regular character in the TV series.

In Pokémon Sword and Shield, a new variant of Weezing are introduced as part of a form called "Galarian", referring to the region Galar featured in the game. It retains its Poison type while gaining the Fairy type, and features some design differences. Weezing has been generally well received, with the Galarian variation being especially popular due to its commentary on the United Kingdom and the environment. It has also been noted for its competitive viability, particularly due to the original form's Levitate ability and the Galarian form's Neutralizing Gas ability.

== Conception and development ==
Weezing is a species of fictional creatures called Pokémon created for the Pokémon media franchise. Developed by Game Freak and published by Nintendo, the Japanese franchise began in 1996 with the video games Pokémon Red and Green for the Game Boy, which were later released in North America as Pokémon Red and Blue in 1998. In these games and their sequels, the player assumes the role of a Trainer whose goal is to capture and use the creatures' special abilities to combat other Pokémon. Some Pokémon can transform into stronger species through a process called evolution via various means, such as exposure to specific items. Each Pokémon has one or two elemental types, which define its advantages and disadvantages when battling other Pokémon. A major goal in each game is to complete the Pokédex, a comprehensive Pokémon encyclopedia, by capturing, evolving, and trading with other Trainers to obtain individuals from all Pokémon species.

When making the games, the design first started as pixel art sprites by the development team, created with a single color identity chosen to work within the Super Game Boy hardware limitations. Once development was complete, Ken Sugimori re-drew the species along with other Pokémon species in his own artstyle in order to give the game a unified look and finalize any design elements, while also trying to maintain the original artist's unique style. In English, Weezing was originally going to be named "La," referring to Los Angeles, while its previous form, Koffing, was originally named Ny, referring to New York. These names were chosen due to the high levels of air pollution in these areas at the time. Weezing is a Poison-type Pokémon, evolving from Koffing via level up. Like Koffing, it is a hovering purple ball containing poison, featuring a skull and bones pattern on its body. With evolution, it gains a second, smaller head. In Ruby and Sapphire, it gained the ability Levitate, protecting it from Ground-type attacks.

In Pokémon Sword and Shield, several Pokémon were given a new regional form called a Galarian form based on the Galar region, including Weezing. In this form, Weezing retains its Poison type while adding a secondary Fairy type. It also gained a new ability called Neutralizing Gas, which causes other Pokémon's abilities to not work. Galarian Weezing has two heads each with a protrusion on top, resembling both smokestacks and top hats. This form's body was changed to be grey, while its smog, which serves as faux facial hair, became green. It retains the skull and bones sign found on Weezing's design. These new elements were designed to make it fit into a United Kingdom-based environment. Video game designer Shigeru Ohmori stated that this design was inspired by seeing a steam engine, and feeling that this reflected the theme of the "strongest Pokémon" featured in Sword and Shield. According to the Pokédex, Galarian Weezing came about in response to air pollution from factories, consuming the contaminants and expelling clean air.

== Appearances ==
Weezing appears in both Red and Blue in the wild or through evolution, but can only be obtained in Pokémon Yellow via trading. It returns in the sequels Gold and Silver, as well as Crystal. It later appears in Pokémon Ruby and Sapphire. In Sword and Shield, a new form called Galarian Weezing was introduced, which is able to be obtained by evolving Koffing in the games. Both forms appear in other media for the series, including the mobile game Pokémon Go, and the Pokémon Trading Card Game.

In the Pokémon TV series, Weezing is owned by James, a member of Team Rocket and ally to Jessie. Originally a Koffing, it was James' only Pokémon, with Ekans being owned by Jessie and its counterpart. Both aid Jessie and James in their plots throughout the series, with Koffing and Ekans eventually evolving into Weezing and Arbok. Weezing and Arbok are later released by the pair in the episode "A Poached Ego" so that they can protect a group of Koffing and Ekans that are threatened by Pokémon poachers. James and Weezing later appeared in the game Pokémon Masters EX, where the pair are playable characters. They are obtainable via a special in-game event. Both forms of Weezing have merchandise, including clothing, figurines, and food.

== Critical reception ==
Galarian Weezing's UK-inspired elements were positively received

Weezing has received generally positive reception. Nintendo Life staff Alex Olney, Zion Grassl, and Jon Cartwright discussed Weezing, with Olney commenting that he found it a significant improvement over Koffing's design, a sentiment shared by fellow contributor Grassl. Cartwright felt that Weezing followed a trend of Pokémon designs in the first generation of Pokémon games of putting multiple entities of a species on a design to convey evolution, which Olney agreed with while also believing that it was a more creative execution on the idea. Olney believed that the second body represented a Koffing growing big enough to split off part of its body into a new body through mitosis. As part of their "Pokémon of the Day" series, IGN staff felt that Weezing was an especially popular Pokémon among viewers of the Pokémon anime series, noting that it, alongside Arbok, were around in the series for a longer period than any Pokémon protagonist Ash Ketchum owned, with the sole exception of his Pikachu. Despite stating she had a soft spot for Weezing because of this, she felt that its role in the video games was "just another forgettable" Poison-type Pokémon in Red and Blue. She believed that it saw improvements in Ruby and Sapphire, thanks to its newfound immunity to the Ground-type attack Earthquake.

Galarian Weezing has been generally well-received, argued by Fanbyte writer Imran Khan as being an example of a good regional Pokémon. Writing for Anime News Network, Lynzee Loveridge and James Beckett regarded Galarian Weezing as one of the best Poison-type Pokémon, praising its design as a particularly good regional variant. They highlighted in particular the "industrial era-London smokestacks" and "oil baron" concepts that were present within its design. GamesRadar+'s Heather Wald wrote that many fans of the series enjoyed the design, highlighting multiple interpretations and comparisons being made out of its design for humorous effect by fans, such as a bong. Nintendo Life writer Rebecca Stow praised Galarian Weezing's design, appreciating its London influences—citing a resemblance to the "iconic" smokestacks of the Battersea Power Station. She felt that it was one of the most hilarious designs she had ever seen from the series, expressing excitement to be able to use it upon the release of Sword and Shield. Destructoid's CJ Andriessen discussed how Galarian Weezing provided commentary on climate change, particularly via the smokestacks in the United Kingdom during the Industrial Revolution, stating that the polluting factories are what caused it to change its form. Yessenia Funes from Gizmodo felt similarly, believing Galarian Weezing to be associated with climate change, predominantly in the form of long-lasting consequences for past events, which Funes believed tied into wider theming within Sword and Shield that had already been established via elements such as Galarian Corsola.

Galarian Weezing's competitive viability has been the subject of commentary. Dot Esports writer Cale Michael suggested that Galarian Weezing's Neutralizing Gas ability could help improve the competitive standing of Pokémon such as Archeops, Slaking, and Regigigas in battle, as the latter three had abilities that hindered their combat capabilities. In another article, he exclaimed that its new Fairy type helped it on its own merit as well, due in part to its immunity to Dragon-type attacks. Callum Archer from TheGamer believed that, despite believing that Weezing was originally a decent Pokémon, Galarian Weezing represented an improvement in competitive play across the board, felt that it to be a great improvement with its type, moveset, and abilities. Archer greatly preferred the Galarian design, believing that while the original Weezing is "classic", it had not aged as well as other older Pokémon, stating that it was one of the stranger designs when compared to newer Pokémon. He found the Galarian Weezing design to be a "fun twist" on the concept.
