= Butterfree =

Pokémon species

- Pokémon character
- Butterfree artwork by Ken Sugimori
- First game: Pokémon Red and Blue (1996)
- Designed by: Ken Sugimori
- Voiced by: Rikako Aikawa

In-universe information
- Species: Pokémon
- Type: Bug and Flying

Butterfree (/ˈbʌtərfriː/; Japanese: バタフリー Hepburn: Batafurī) is a Pokémon species in Nintendo and Game Freak's Pokémon media franchise, and the evolved form of Metapod, an evolution of the Pokémon Caterpie. First introduced in the video games Pokémon Red and Blue, it is among the first Pokémon available to the player and evolves sooner than most other Pokémon species. In Pokémon Sword and Shield, a new form for Butterfree called Gigantamax Butterfree was introduced that increases its size significantly and changes aspects of its design. Since Butterfree's debut, it has appeared in multiple games in the series, including Pokémon Go and the Pokémon Trading Card Game, as well as various merchandise.

Classified as both a Bug and Flying-type Pokémon, Butterfree is an insect which is based on a butterfly, while its previous forms are based on a caterpillar and chrysalis, respectively. It has white wings with black patterns, antennae, red compound eyes, and a purple two-segment body with blue hands and feet. Entomologist Rebecca M. Kittel argued that Butterfree and its prior forms all take inspiration from different insects. Due to these dissimilarities, an urban legend was formed that suggested the Pokémon Venomoth originally evolved from Metapod and that Butterfree evolved from Venonat due to their similarities.

In the Pokémon anime, Butterfree is a Pokémon of protagonist Ash Ketchum, evolving from a Caterpie he caught in "Ash Catches a Pokémon". Its departure in the anime has been considered one of the most touching moments in the series due to it being the first Pokémon he caught, as well as the fact that it did not return for most of the anime. It eventually returned in the finale of Ash's story, which was considered an impactful moment.

== Conception and development ==
Butterfree is a species of fictional creatures called Pokémon created for the Pokémon media franchise. Developed by Game Freak and published by Nintendo, the Japanese franchise began in 1996 with the video games Pokémon Red and Green for the Game Boy, which were later released in North America as Pokémon Red and Blue in 1998. In these games and their sequels, the player assumes the role of a Trainer whose goal is to capture and use the creatures' special abilities to combat other Pokémon. Some Pokémon can transform into stronger species through a process called evolution via various means. Each Pokémon has one or two elemental types, which define its advantages and disadvantages when battling other Pokémon. A major goal in each game is to complete the Pokédex, a comprehensive Pokémon encyclopedia, by capturing, evolving, and trading with other Trainers to obtain individuals from all Pokémon species.

When making the games, the design first started as pixel art sprites by the development team, created with a single color identity chosen to work within the Super Game Boy hardware limitations. While conceived as a group effort by multiple developers at Game Freak, once development was complete Sugimori re-drew the species along with the others in his own artstyle in order to give the game a unified look and finalize any design elements, while also trying to maintain the original sprite artist's unique style. When the games were localized for English-speaking audiences, Nintendo of America gave the various Pokémon species descriptive names related to their appearance or features as a means to make them more relatable to American children.

=== Design ===
Butterfree is an insect-like Pokémon, resembling a butterfly. Its purple body features two segments, and its mouth, hands, and feet are blue. It features red compound eyes, a pair of antennae, small white fangs, and white wings with a black pattern. It evolves from Metapod, a green chrysalis form that evolves from Caterpie which has a nose-like protrusion. Caterpie is also green, resembling a caterpillar with a red protrusion from its head. Author Rebecca M. Kittel discussed the growth of Caterpie into Butterfree, suggesting that Caterpie resembled an Asian swallowtail, while Metapod resembled a swallowtail chrysalis, specifically stating that its "nose-like protrusion" resembles a Polydamas swallowtail and pipevine swallowtail. For Butterfree, she argued that while it bore a resemblance to Aporia crataegi, it had teeth instead of a proboscis which members of that species of butterflies have. She also described that Butterfree's two-segmented body differed from adult insects' three-segmented bodies. Pokémon Sword and Shield introduced a new form for multiple Pokémon called Gigantamax forms, including Butterfree. In addition to becoming significantly larger, it gained larger wings, compared to the kaiju Mothra.

== Appearances ==
First found in Pokémon Red and Blue, Butterfree has appeared in many main series Pokémon titles since. In Red and Blue, Butterfree is available early in the game through evolution from a Caterpie or Metapod caught in the wild, evolving at a lower level than most other Pokémon. It is featured in Pokémon Sword and Shield, given a new form called Gigantamax Butterfree. Butterfree is available in the mobile game Pokémon Go and the Pokémon Trading Card Game.

In the Pokémon TV series, Caterpie is the first Pokémon Ash Ketchum caught in the third episode, "Ash Catches a Pokémon". It eventually evolved into Metapod and then Butterfree, and was at one point temporarily traded for a Raticate before trading back. Butterfree later finds a mate, who it falls in love with. At the end of the episode, Ash lets it leave to be with its mate despite his sadness over its departure. Butterfree and Ash eventually reunite twenty years later in the series finale at the end of Ash's journey. It is voiced by Rikako Aikawa. Butterfree also appears in the anime film Pokémon the Movie: I Choose You!, a retelling of the original series with some differences.

== Reception ==
Venonat, another Bug-type Pokémon, is the subject of an urban legend that Butterfree originally evolved from it

Butterfree has received generally positive reception. In their Pokémon of the Day series, IGN stated that Butterfree was a Pokémon that players could obtain early through evolution and who was useful early on before largely became useless. "Bye-Bye Butterfree" has been considered one of the most touching farewell episodes in the Pokémon anime, with Real Sound staff noting that it caused many fans to cry over Butterfree's departure. Author Quentin Gervasoni believed that Butterfree was famous because of this episode, and that the scene of it departing became a meme due to its emotional impact. The fact that it was the first Pokémon released by anyone in the anime series at that point was also a contributing factor to its departure's impact according to IGN. Anime News Network writer Jacob Chapman stated that, despite not being as torn up over Butterfree's departure as others, the scene was "burned into [his] brain." He also suggested that this scene mirrored the first experience of loss for many children. TheGamer writer Brandon Howard expressed a desire for Butterfree to return to the anime upon hearing that Ash's story was nearing its conclusion; he felt that releasing Butterfree was one of Ash's most difficult decisions in the series, stating that it would be a good send-off for Ash to have him and Butterfree reunite.

Crunchyroll writer Daniel Dockery argued that the episode was the saddest episode of television, discussing how Butterfree's departure deviates from how Pokémon works—namely, that players can store Pokémon they do not use, which he argued contrasted with Butterfree's "uncontrolled destiny". He also argued that Ash and Butterfree's relationship resembled that of a father and son, noting how Butterfree was the only Pokémon that actually grew through evolution at the time, and thus the only one he watched grow up. This idea was also exploded by author Tim Jordan, who concurred that Butterfree being his first Pokémon caught emphasized the emotion for Ash.

Butterfree's design, particularly in relation to its previous forms, has been the subject of discussion by critics. An urban legend for the Pokémon franchise exists which argues that Butterfree and Venomoth were originally meant to be part of each other's respective evolutionary lines. GamesRadar+ writer Ashley Reed suggested that the theory had credence due to dissimilarities between Butterfree and Metapod, as well as similarities between it and Venonat, the first form of Venomoth. In particular, she argued that the similar color and compound eyes between Butterfree and Venonat demonstrates this apparent connection. Magmix staff agreed on this, stating that Butterfree's fangs, antennae, eyes, and hand shape are nearly identical to Venonat's, while Venomoth's three-pronged horn and eyes seemed to relate more to Butterfree's previous forms. According to Inside Games writer Sawasdee Otsuka, people have speculated that the similarities between them caused them to not be featured in the same game together after appearing together in Gold and Silver.
