= Pokéfuta =

Pokémon-themed manhole covers in Japan

The first Pokéfuta installed in 2018, located in Ibusuki and featuring Eevee

Pokéfuta (Japanese: ポケふた) or Poké Lids are manhole covers in Japan decorated with drawings of Pokémon characters. Beginning installation in 2018, over 400 covers have since been installed by The Pokémon Company in cities and towns across the country. They serve as local points of interest, attracting tourists to lesser known destinations in Japan.

== Background ==
In Japan, manhole covers are often decorated with artistic designs, with CBS News reporting in 2019 that over 6,000 designs were spread across the country. The practice originated in the 1980s as a public relations campaign for the revitalization of sewer systems. Many towns and cities across Japan have their own designs which represent the local identity, and the practice has garnered sufficient interest from the public for annual manhole exhibitions.

The Pokémon Company, in partnership with local Japanese governments within the "Pokémon Local Acts" project, began designing and installing manhole covers to be installed in Japanese towns, partly to attract tourists to smaller uncommon destinations and help revitalize cities struck by natural disasters. The first such manhole installed featured the Pokémon Eevee, installed in the city of Ibusuki in Kagoshima Prefecture on 20 December 2018. The covers were made in Miyaki, Saga Prefecture, and were hand-colored. Their manufacturer, Hinode Water Equipment, is Japan's largest manhole cover manufacturer.

== Distribution ==
As of June 2025, there were 404 Pokéfuta installed across 40 prefectures of Japan, with Miyagi Prefecture having the most installations with 35 manholes as of 2021. The prefecture has a Pokéfuta for each of its 35 municipalities. This compared to the around 100 installed by August 2020. Hokkaido had 34 covers, Miyazaki Prefecture hosted 26 spots, while Tokyo Prefecture hosted 12. One notable location is in the remote village of Ogasawara in Tokyo Prefecture, located over 1,000 km away from Tokyo proper and featuring four Pokéfuta. The Tōhoku region, heavily damaged by the 2011 Tōhoku earthquake and tsunami, contains the highest concentration – one third of the covers were located there as of March 2021.

Each manhole cover had a unique design, featuring one or more Pokémon. In some cases, the choice of the featured Pokémon was related to the location – for example, Eevee was chosen for Ibusuki due to wordplay ("Ibusuki" (いぶすき, ibusuki) rhymes with "I like Eevee" (イーブイ好き, Ībui suki)), and in some prefectures a specific Pokémon is consistently featured – such as in Hokkaido, Tottori, and Fukushima where all covers featured the Pokémon Vulpix, Sandshrew/Sandslash and Chansey respectively, which had been selected as the prefectures' "Pokémon ambassadors". Many of the cover designs also feature local tourist attractions at their locations. The covers are used as "Pokéstops" in the mobile game Pokémon Go. Official merchandise featuring the designs on the manhole covers have also been released.

In the mobile apps/games Pokémon Go and Pokémon Home, virtual stamps depicting the designs on the Pokéfuta are obtainable.
