= Voltorb =

Pokémon species

- Pokémon character
- Voltorb artwork by Ken Sugimori
- First game: Pokémon Red and Blue (1996)
- Created by: Ken Sugimori
- Designed by: Ken Sugimori (original)
- Voiced by: Katsuyuki Konishi

In-universe information
- Species: Pokémon
- Type: Electric; Electric and Grass (Hisuian)

Voltorb (/ˈvɔːltɔːrb/), known in Japan as Biriridama (Japanese: ビリリダマ), is a Pokémon species in Nintendo and Game Freak's Pokémon media franchise. First introduced in the video games Pokémon Red and Blue, they were created by Ken Sugimori, appearing in the earliest design document for the game. Since their initial appearance they have appeared in multiple games including Pokémon GO and the Pokémon Trading Card Game, as well as various merchandise related to the franchise. While Katsuyuki Konishi has been credited for voicing the species in Japanese, no English voice actor has been attributed to or taken credit for them.

Classified as an Electric-type Pokemon, Voltorb is a spherical species that resembles an item in the game's universe, a Poké Ball. Often confused for them, they will emit electricity or explode when jolted. A regional variant was added later in Pokémon Legends: Arceus called Hisuian Voltorb, resembling the Poké Balls of that region and classified as both an Electric- and Grass-type. Voltorb can evolve into a stronger Pokémon, Electrode, either through experience or the use of a "Leaf Stone" item respectively. Voltorb has seen use in promotions across Japan, as a mascot of the franchise.

Voltorb has received a mixed reception. It has been heavily criticised for its simplistic design, which has been called one of the franchise's worst, and more so an example of the shortcomings of Red and Blue's Pokémon designs as a whole in contrast to what came in later games for the series. However, some critics still praised aspects of the species, not only in comparison to Electrode but also due to its role as a mimic from classic role-playing games. Other outlets praised it for helping to define later Pokémon designs based on objects, and how fandoms used theories about them to explore more depth in the franchise. Hisuian Voltorb by comparison was more well received, with praise given to its cheerful demeanor as well as the questions it raised on which came first, the Voltorb or the Poké Ball.

== Conception and design ==
Voltorb is a species of fictional creatures called Pokémon created for the Pokémon media franchise. Developed by Game Freak and published by Nintendo, the Japanese franchise began in 1996 with the video games Pokémon Red and Green for the Game Boy, which were later released in North America as Pokémon Red and Blue in 1998. In these games and their sequels, the player assumes the role of a Trainer whose goal is to capture and use the creatures' special abilities to combat other Pokémon. Some Pokémon can transform into stronger species through a process called evolution via various means, such as exposure to specific items. Each Pokémon has one or two elemental types, which define its advantages and disadvantages when battling other Pokémon. A major goal in each game is to complete the Pokédex, a comprehensive Pokémon encyclopedia, by capturing, evolving, and trading with other Trainers to obtain individuals from all Pokémon species.

Created by Ken Sugimori, Voltorb was one of the earliest Pokémon designed during the planning stages of Red and Blue, back when the games were intended to be called Capsule Monsters, appearing on early concept sprite art for the game. As work on the game progressed, a single color identity was chosen in order to work within the Super Game Boy's hardware limitations. Voltorb's size was eventually scaled down. During a company poll to decide which Pokémon would be included in the final game, it placed 21st out of the roughly 80 proposed designs created at that time. Once development was complete, Sugimori re-drew the species along with the others in his own art style to give the game a unified look and finalize design elements.

Compared to regular Voltorb, the Hisuian form was more positively received due to their cheerful demeanor.

Standing 1 foot 8 inches (51 cm) tall, Voltorb is a round, ball-shaped creature with the top and bottom hemispheres appearing red and white respectively. It has two eyes near the upper middle front, perpetually locked in an angry expression. A rarer, "shiny" variant that is blue instead of red also exists. Classified as an "Electric"-type Pokémon and resembling an item in the universe called a "Poké Ball", they are genderless, and often reside in factories where Poké Balls are produced. Moving by rolling, they will either attempt to shock nearby people or may explode due to a sudden jolt. After gaining enough experience, they may evolve into Electrode. Called Biriridama in Japan, when localizing the games for western audiences Nintendo decided to give the various species "clever and descriptive names" related to their appearance or features as a means to make the species more relatable to American children. As a result, they were renamed "Voltorb" due to their spherical shape and electric nature.

When developing Pokémon Legends: Arceus in 2022, regional "forms" of several Pokémon were introduced called Hisuian forms, variants of existing Pokémon that are related to the game's region, and Voltorb was one of them. Gaining an additional "Grass" typing, its design is slightly different, having joyful, angular eyes and a wood grain appearance in contrast to regular Voltorb's metallic appearance, resembling the look of Poké Balls in the game. It also has a hole on the top of its head where it will sprout seeds or alternatively discharge electricity when excited. Unlike regular Voltorb, which evolves by getting experience, Hisuian Voltorb requires a "Leaf Stone" item to evolve into the regional Electrode counterpart, and its shiny version appears black on top instead of blue.

== Appearances ==
First appearing in Pokémon Red and Blue, they were found in large quantities in the game's "Power Plant" location, where they would disguise themselves as item containers and attack players that interacted with them. They went on to subsequently appear in several games in the series, including every mainline title until Pokémon Sword and Shield. While it was omitted from those games, its Hisuian counterpart later appeared in Pokémon Legends: Arceus, and both subsequently appeared in Pokémon Scarlet and Violet. In Scarlet and Violet in particular, if approached without sneaking up upon it first, it will now explode immediately, making it more difficult to catch. Meanwhile, in the re-releases of Gold and Silver, called HeartGold and SoulSilver, localized versions of the game replaced the slot machine mini-game with another game themed around the species called "Voltorb Flip". Described as a "cross between Picross and Minesweeper, the change was done in response to European Union laws regarding promotions of gambling in video games.

Voltorb have also appeared in several spin-off titles related to the franchise, such as Pokémon GO, Pokémon Quest, and the trading card game. Pokemon Quest developer Tsubasa Matsuzaki in particular experienced difficulty adapting Voltorb due to the "block" based depiction of the species in the game, experiencing some backlash from players. In Pokémon GO, they were part of the game's "Charge Up" event, and later as part of a "spotlight event" after the addition of the Hisuian form to the game. Outside the games, they have also been featured in several episodes of the anime and often used for comedy relief, with one notable shiny specimen being captured by the character Goh. Katsuyuki Konishi has been credited for voicing the species in Japanese, no English voice actor has been attributed to or taken credit for them.

== Promotion and reception ==
Despite being a minor species, Voltorb has been featured in several public promotions across Japan

Nintendo has heavily promoted Voltorb through various merchandise, including items such as drink mixes, keychains, and plushes. In January 2023, as part of a promotion between JR East and The Pokémon Company, Voltorb images were put up around Akita Station in Japan along with a fake "caution" sign for visitors to take pictures beside. In August of that year, a "Summer Festival Park" event was held in Yokohama, with one of the festival games featured being themed around the species. In 2021, leading up to the release of Pokémon Legends: Arceus, Hisuian Voltorb was significantly promoted, first alluded to via a mini-game on social media website Twitter where players were encouraged to collect Poké Balls, one of which exploded, and later on Nintendo's website where several episodes featuring the species were bundled together on their streaming service. Two stop-motion shorts followed afterward, focused on Hisuian Voltorb.

Since their introduction, Voltorb has been routinely criticized for what has been perceived as a simplistic design, especially in the scope of the original Pokémon introduced in Red and Blue. Jake Magee of GamesRadar+ in particular called it the worst offender of all the franchise's Pokémon species in this aspect, noting that without the eyes its design was essentially just a Poké Ball. He further argued that it helped paint the first generation of Pokémon in a negative light when compared to what came after, a sentiment shared by Kotaku's Patricia Hernandez. IGN called it "probably the laziest Pokémon design", but acknowledged that Red and Blue needed to rely on simpler designs in order to work with the Game Boy's small resolution and their criticism should not be seen as disdain. However, Kyle Hilliard of Game Informer was more aggressive, stating that "designing a Pokémon based on the lifeless spheres that house other Pokémon is just stupid."

Other outlets were a bit more generous towards their design. While James Stephanie Sterling of Destructoid listed both Voltorb and Electrode in her list of thirty "rubbish" Pokémon, she felt the former "has slightly more character, despite being pretty damn crap in its own right". Liz Finnegan of The Escapist criticized it as "hands down, the most disappointing Pokémon from a design perspective", but acknowledged their abilities to self-destruct and camouflage themselves also helped make it one of the best Pokémon in the franchise. Robert Grosso of TechRaptor went further, stating that while he was aware Voltorb was on the minds of many when it came to underwhelming Pokémon, its role as a living bomb meant to surprise trainers gave the game's world some character. TheGamer's Sergio Solorzano argued that Voltorb and "object" Pokémon like it were actually "brilliant" designs, proposing that Voltorb may be the father of all such concepts in the franchise and helped the developers to think outside of the box when creating new Pokémon as the series progressed.

Screen Rant's Hayes Madsen argued they served as a similar purpose to that of the "mimic" creature often found in roleplaying games, acting as a subversion on multiple layers as "any treasure found in the world of Pokemon is stored inside Pokeballs, just like the Pokemon themselves", and further defined what to expect from similar mimic-themed Pokémon in later games. Paste writers Kevin Slackie and Moises Taveras stated that while they felt surprising players with a Voltorb encounter when expecting an item was a "cruel trick" to play on them, "this classic bait-and-switch was one of the first ways that Pokémon felt alive". Alex Lucard writing for Beckett Pokémon Unofficial Collector enjoyed the comic relief its mimicry brought to the anime as a recurring gag and felt Voltorb was underappreciated, stating "there's something about a life form evolving to look like its own instrument of capture that appeals to the Blade Runner fan in me." James Troughton in an article for TheGamer on the other hand argued that their formulaic usage throughout the franchise coupled with a lack of randomness made them feel more "run-of-the-mill", a trait he felt shared by mimic-enemies in other franchises. Jon Cartwright of NintendoLife in their retrospective of Red and Blue's designs noted that while the mimic aspect was the one thing he liked about Voltorb, especially in light of Electrode, "I don't know if that justifies everything about the Pokémon."

While he acknowledged the possible mimic concept origin, Solorzano in his own article for TheGamer suggested an alternative origin for Voltorb's design. Citing that their species number 100 in the game's Pokédex, he drew comparison to the Japanese folklore of tsukumogami, a legend that on its 100th birthday a tool will gain sentience, and felt that their in-game descriptions further corroborated this theory. The vague origins of the species have resulted in players proposing their own theories, which Lincoln Geraghty in a paper for The Journal of Fandom Studies cited as an example of fandoms attempting to fill in gaps and better rationalize the media they were consuming.

By comparison, the Hisuian form of Voltorb was more positively received. Malachi Lyonsdove of Game Rant suggested it provided a "chicken or the egg" conundrum of which came first, the Pokémon or the Poké Ball they are disguised as, and caused some continuity errors in the game's canon that had previously implied Voltorb was an artificial result of Poké Ball production. While he felt Voltorb would never reach the level of popularity as some of the series' more notable Pokémon, unlike them their unique design differences pointed to a narrative of how Pokémon species changed due to living alongside humans, their previously friendly nature shifting to a more aggressive one as time went on. He further stated that such "open-ended and vague information" was one of the franchise's strongest points.
