= Mimic (Dungeons & Dragons) =

Shape-shifting monster from fantasy role-playing games

- The mimic as depicted in the 1977 Advanced Dungeons & Dragons Monster Manual
- First appearance: Monster Manual (1977)

In-universe information
- Type: Aberration (3rd edition)

In the Dungeons & Dragons fantasy role-playing game, the mimic is a type of fictional monster. It is portrayed as being able to change its shape to disguise its body as an inanimate object, commonly a chest. The mimic uses a powerful adhesive that holds fast to creatures that touch it, allowing the mimic to beat its victims with its powerful pseudopods. The mimic was introduced in the first edition Advanced Dungeons & Dragons game's original Monster Manual. The mimic has appeared in subsequent editions. Several variants of the creature have been introduced, with a variety of abilities and sizes.

== Publication history ==
An original creation for the game's artificial underground environment, this "iconic monster" looks like a treasure chest and is designed as a trap for unwary player characters.

=== Advanced Dungeons & Dragons 1st edition ===
The mimic made its first appearance in the original Monster Manual (1977), by Gary Gygax. This book described mimics as "subterranean creatures which cannot stand the light of the sun. They are able to perfectly mimic stone or wood." According to the book, mimics thus pose as items such as stonework, doors, or chests; when a character or creature touches the disguised mimic, the mimic can lash out with a bludgeoning pseudopod. A mimic excretes an adhesive glue to hold fast whatever touches it. The book states that all mimics move about constantly in search of prey. Mimics are described as neutral in alignment.

The Monster Manual mentions that there are two types of mimic encountered in the game. The slightly smaller version is more intelligent, and is generally friendly if offered food, usually telling a player character about what it has seen nearby. These creatures have their own language and can usually speak several other tongues. The book described the larger variety of mimic as a carnivorous creature called a "killer mimic". This creature does not speak, and will attack anything which is nearby. The Monster Manual was reviewed by Don Turnbull in the British magazine White Dwarf No. 8 (August/September 1978). As part of his review, Turnbull comments on several new monsters introduced in the book, referring to the mimic as a thing which adventurers from his Greenlands dungeon "are not going to be best placed to meet".

The July 1983 issue of Dragon magazine (No. 75) featured the article "The Ecology of the Mimic", by Ed Greenwood. This article provides additional in-game descriptions of the mimic, with the information purported as having come from "the Journals of Maerlun the Scholar". The article states that a mimic's hide is naturally gray in hue, with a smooth very hard outer skin that appears stone-like; a mimic is able to change the color and texture of its outer surface to resemble wood-grain by shifting a brown pigmented liquid between its interior and exterior body cells to fill the many capillaries lying just beneath the skin surface, while the creature can empty these capillaries to revert to its normal stone-like appearance. A mimic is amorphous, able to alter the external configuration of its form at will, and the more intelligent ones can even assume the shape of a partition wall, overhanging arch, or rough rock wall; this feat is accomplished by the creature's mode of travel, which involves extending its strong pseudopods, which exude a sticky "glue", and pulling itself along ("unsticking" its own glue at will), traveling on walls and ceilings as easily as it can on floors. The article also describes how a mimic observes its surroundings through its very sensitive "eyespots" (patches of pigment that are sensitive to heat, light, and vibration) all over its skin; bright sunlight effectively blinds a mimic by overwhelming these sensory spots, which is why mimics are almost always found in areas where the sun never reaches. Austin Wood of PC Gamer described Greenwood's article as "probably the closest thing to science to ever come out of D&D".

The monster collection "Creature Catalog III" in Dragon No. 101 (September 1985) featured a creature by contributor Gregory Detwiler known as the metal mimic. The entry states that a metal mimic is a more powerful relative of the "ordinary" mimic, with all of the mimic's basic abilities and characteristics, but being able to imitate metal, in addition to being able to imitate wood and stone. The metal mimic can take on the shape and appearance of items of any raw or finished metal, which includes the color, luster, and texture of any pure metal (such as iron, gold, silver, or platinum) except for adamantite, but cannot form into any alloy. A metal mimic can also create a magical illumination from itself or from any nearby object. A metal mimic can exude a pseudopod in the form of a sword or dagger; such extremities will appear to be a valuable enchanted blade, to lure prey. According to this entry, metal mimics come in two types: the larger, non-belligerent type which may be willing to negotiate for food, and the smaller "killer mimic" which is instinctively aggressive.

Dungeon magazine No. 19 (October 1989) includes the adventure scenario "The Vanishing Village", by Marcus Rowland, which features the house hunters; these creatures are described in the adventure synopsis as "gigantic relatives of mimics, able to imitate cottages and other buildings up to the size of a small inn or temple."

=== Advanced Dungeons & Dragons 2nd edition ===
The mimic first appeared for second edition Advanced Dungeons & Dragons in the second volume of the Monstrous Compendium series (1989). In this set, the creature is described as magically-created, and usually appears in the form of a treasure chest, although its natural color is a speckled grey that resembles granite. The entry notes that a mimic can alter its pigmentation to appear like various types of stone (including marble), and various metals (including gold, silver, and copper); a mimic cannot lose mass in this transformation, but may radically alter its dimensions. This entry reveals the in-game origin of the mimic: "Mimics were originally created by wizards to protect themselves from treasure hunters"; the language spoken by the smaller variety of mimic, also known as the common mimic, is a corruption of the original language spoken by their wizard creators. Mimics have no moral code and are sometimes difficult to employ as guardians; the killer mimic is neutral in alignment like the common mimic, but has a tendency towards evil. The entry also notes that alcohol will weaken a mimic's glue, and that the mimic may neutralize the glue at any time; a mimic is also immune to acid attacks and is unaffected by molds, green slime, and various pudding monsters. The mimic's entry is reprinted in the Monstrous Manual (1993).

The space mimic appeared in the Spelljammer appendix for the Monstrous Compendium series (1990); the introduction credits Bruce Heard with the creature's design. These creatures inhabit the setting's "wildspace" between planetary bodies, and were created by wizards for use in long journeys, but proved unreliable servants and were discarded. A space mimic's natural skin is described as "pitch black, with small specks of twinkling light, imitating a space background," and the creature is about the same size as a common mimic. A space mimic may pass as ship debris floating in wildspace, or as an elaborate desk with books and scrolls on an abandoned ship, and can resemble a piece of furniture of any variety of wood, stone, or metal. A space mimic has two eyes, which are normally hidden under thick eyelids. A space mimic also has the innate ability to cast spells as if it were an illusionist, and the creature has an interest in magic as well as food. The entry states that a space mimic will use its magic to become invisible and hypnotize a wizard, levitating itself to lure him somewhere alone, then steal his books, scrolls, and magic items before eating the victim.

Another mimic variant appears in the Forgotten Realms setting boxed set, The Ruins of Undermountain II: The Deep Levels (1994), in the set's 16-page Monstrous Compendium booklet. Stated to be found only in the setting's Undermountain thus far, the greater mimic is vastly larger than a common mimic and can cover a whole room or a small building such as a tomb; the largest known specimen can cover a 30-foot (9.1 m) cubic area. A greater mimic has a higher intelligence than a common mimic, and a limited resistance to magic, and "can alter its coloring and shape to imitate a vast number of textures, colors, and shapes at once... [creating] entire rooms of furniture, treasure and tapestries." A greater mimic can block a corridor and alter its shape to become a room with entrance doors on either side, so that its prey walks directly into it; a greater mimic will always use enticements such as simulated treasure or furniture to lure prey, and will wait until an entire group enters before attacking. A greater mimic will then release its natural adhesive across all its surfaces and attack by slamming the walls of its structure together. A minority of greater mimics can develop an ability to display illusory creatures inside itself, pretending to speak through these creatures' mouths. This mutation of the common mimic, according to its entry in this boxed set, is presumed to be the result of either a mimic having lived for a century and grown to great size, or perhaps a mimic altered by the strange magic of Undermountain and the wizards that reside there. A greater mimic is unlikely to obey a wizard, although Halaster is able to use these creatures as guards and barriers against adventurers. A greater mimic has limited mobility to due its size, and will usually settle in one place. A greater mimic makes pacts with other local creatures for food, but can sustain itself on little or no food for long periods of time if need be; a greater mimic has a prodigious appetite, however, and does not practice conservation if a steady supply of food is available. A greater mimic appears in this boxed set's Campaign Guide booklet, as part of the "Muiral's Gauntlet" scenario, living in an abandoned drow complex. When encountered by player characters, this greater mimic covers most of the floor in an apparent storeroom filled with boxes of coins and valuables; if it appears to be losing a fight against the characters, it will negotiate, trading information for its life. The greater mimic's entry is reprinted in the Monstrous Compendium Annual Two (1995), although no mention is made there of Undermountain.

All three varieties of the house hunter mimic appear for the game's second edition in the Monstrous Compendium Annual One (1994).

=== Dungeons & Dragons 3rd edition ===
The mimic appears in the Monster Manual (2000) for the game's third edition. In this edition, the mimic is given the aberration creature type. This book describes mimics as "strange and deadly creatures that can change their pigmentation and shape. They use this ability to lure hapless victims close enough to slay." This book notes that a weapon striking a mimic becomes stuck to the creature's thick, slimy adhesive, though the weapon can be pried off. In this edition, a mimic can assume the general shape of any object that fills roughly 150 cubic feet (4.2 m^{3}). The mimic also appears in the revised Monster Manual (2003) for v 3.5. This book notes that a mimic begins to crush any creature which becomes stuck to one of the mimic's pseudopods.

In the third edition, the common and killer varieties were now simply known as the "mimic". The creature lost a language of its own, now speaking in the Common tongue to negotiate with adventurers.

=== Dungeons & Dragons 4th edition ===
The mimic appeared in the 4th edition Monster Manual 3 (2010).

=== Dungeons & Dragons 5th edition ===
The mimic appears in the 5th edition Monster Manual (2014). The game's art historians Witwer et al. viewed its depiction in 5th edition as "redesigned from prior editions to entice more Dungeon Master use."

== Reception ==
Rob Bricken, for io9, named the mimic as the 3rd most memorable D&D monster, and as one of "The 12 Most Obnoxious Dungeons & Dragons Monsters".

Jennifer Melzer, for CBR, wrote, "The mimic first appeared in Gary Gygax's original Monster Manual in 1977 and was described as a creature that could not stand sunlight and was perfectly able to mimic the appearance of stone or wood. Across the decades and the numerous editions of the game, mimics remain one of the most recognizable and obnoxious monsters because players never know when they might run into one. They aren't exactly the most dangerous enemies for an experienced adventuring party to encounter, but they have been known to nearly take out less worldly adventurers who happen upon them unexpectedly in the wild — or in someone's basement. [...] Unfortunately, they don't have any weaknesses that make up for their immunities, but that shouldn't stop anyone from trying to set one on fire if given the chance".

== In other media ==
Mimic game icon by Delapouite

A mimic appeared as monster in the film Dungeons & Dragons: Honor Among Thieves (2023). A depiction of a mimic, by artist Wayne Reynolds, was featured in a limited edition stamp collection by the Royal Mail for Dungeons & Dragons 50th anniversary.

The mimic has been added into many video games, including Baldur's Gate, Dragon Quest, ToeJam & Earl, Final Fantasy, Borderlands, Landstalker, Magicka, Terraria, Torchlight, and Enter the Gungeon, as well as the Dark Souls franchise. Mods also exist which add the creature into other games.

The mimic appears in the first Bestiary for the Pathfinder Roleplaying Game, and is also detailed in Paizo Publishing's book Dungeon Denizens Revisited (2009).

The mimic is featured in several popular fantasy themed anime and manga, such as Frieren and Delicious in Dungeon.
