= List of generation I Pokémon =

The international logo for the Pokémon franchise

The first generation (generation I) of the Pokémon franchise features the original 151 fictional species of monsters introduced to the core video game series in the 1996 Game Boy games Pocket Monsters Red, Green and Blue (known as Pokémon Red, Green and Blue outside of Japan). Later, Pokémon Yellow and Blue were released in Japan.

The following list details the 151 Pokémon of generation I in order of their National Pokédex number. The first Pokémon, Bulbasaur, is number 0001 and the last, Mew, is number 0151. Alternate forms that result in type changes are included for convenience. Mega evolutions and regional forms are included on the pages for the generation in which they were introduced. MissingNo., a glitch, is also on this list.

== Design and development ==
Pokémon are a species of fictional creatures created for the Pokémon media franchise. Developed by Game Freak and published by Nintendo, the Japanese franchise began in 1996 with the video games Pokémon Red and Green for the Game Boy, which were later released in North America as Pokémon Red and Blue in 1998. In these games and their sequels, the player assumes the role of a Trainer whose goal is to capture and use the creatures' special abilities to combat other Pokémon. Some Pokémon can transform into stronger species through a process called evolution via various means, such as through battling or exposure to specific items. Each Pokémon have one or two elemental types, which define its advantages and disadvantages when battling other Pokémon. A major goal in each game is to complete the Pokédex, a comprehensive Pokémon encyclopedia, by capturing Pokémon, evolving them, and trading with other Trainers to obtain individuals from all Pokémon species.

The designs of each Pokémon started as pixel art sprites by the development team first, with a single color identity chosen to work within the Super Game Boy hardware limitations. With the early development team consisting of three men, character design lead Ken Sugimori brought female developers into the project feeling they would be better able to create "cute" designs. While conceived as a group effort by multiple developers at Game Freak, the finalized designs and artworks were done by Sugimori. Originally tasked with drawing the characters to illustrate a planned strategy guide by Game Freak when the games released, Sugimori drew all the sprites for the game in his style to not only unify their designs visually, but also modify any design elements he felt were amiss, while trying to retain the original sprite artist's unique style. While some Pokémon have been attributed to certain developers over the years, such as Atsuko Nishida for Pikachu and Motofumi Fujiwara for Eevee and its evolutions, Game Freak has avoided attributing many Pokémon to particular individuals to keep a sense of all the developers being involved in their creation.

The majority of Pokémon in generation I had relatively simple designs and were similar to real-life creatures including Pidgey (a pigeon), Krabby (a crab), Rattata (a rat), and Ekans (a snake). Many Pokémon in the original games served as the base for repeating concepts later in the series. Some Pokémon, such as Squirtle, Bulbasaur and Charmander were designed based on their final evolutions and working backwards. During development they ran into issues with digital cartridge space, and many Pokémon were removed. Specifically, several Pokémon that had a three-stage evolution line were instead changed to evolve only once, resulting in a planned final evolution for Pikachu called "Gorochu" being removed from the final game.

When the games were localized for English-speaking audiences as Red and Blue, Nintendo of America gave the various Pokémon species "clever and descriptive names" related to their appearance or features as a means to make them more relatable to American children. This resulted in several pop-culture references being worked into the character's names, such as Hitmonchan and Hitmonlee, who are references to martial arts actors Jackie Chan and Bruce Lee respectively. Overseen by translator Nob Ogasawara, he voiced concern over some of the choices presented, specifically "Barrierd", which was renamed to "Mr. Mime" based on its masculine appearance. Ogasawara wanted to avoid gendered, binary names for the Pokémon species in the event genders were introduced for them in later titles, a concern proven valid with the sequel titles Pokémon Gold and Silver.

== List of Pokémon ==
List of Pokémon species introduced in generation I (1996) (Note: Details on Pokémon names, National Pokédex numbers, types and evolutions are obtained from The Pokémon Company International's online Pokédex.)
Name (Note: English and Japanese name, as well as National Pokédex number)	Type(s)	Evolves from	Evolves into	Notes
Bulbasaur Fushigidane (フシギダネ) (0001)	Grass / Poison	—N/a	Ivysaur (#0002)	Bulbasaur is one of Kanto's starter Pokémon. It has a bulb on its back, which stores nutrients. Since the bulb can photosynthesize, Bulbasaur can go days without eating. As with the rest of its evolutionary line, its bulb has vines the Pokémon uses as tentacles.
Ivysaur Fushigisō (フシギソウ) (0002)	Grass / Poison	Bulbasaur (#0001)	Venusaur (#0003)	Ivysaur is a playable character in Super Smash Bros. Brawl and Super Smash Bros. Ultimate as a part of the "Pokémon Trainer" fighter. Its bulb has grown into a bud, which it uses to convert sunlight into power. The bud is heavy, to the point of rendering Ivysaur unable to move properly if it has stored enough nutrients, so its hind legs have grown stronger to counter the weight.
Venusaur Fushigibana (フシギバナ) (0003)	Grass / Poison	Ivysaur (#0002)	Mega Evolution; Gigantamax	The mascot of Pokémon Green and LeafGreen. The bud on its back has bloomed into a flower. It has a soothing aroma, and converts sunlight into energy. For this reason, Venusaur is more powerful during the summer. It gained a Mega Evolution in generation VI, and a Gigantamax form in generation VIII.
Charmander Hitokage (ヒトカゲ) (0004)	Fire	—N/a	Charmeleon (#0005)	Charmander is one of Kanto's starter Pokémon. A flame burns at the tip of its tail from the moment it hatches. Still unfamiliar with fire, a Charmander might accidentally burn itself. If its flame goes out, it dies.
Charmeleon Rizādo (リザード) (0005)	Fire	Charmander (#0004)	Charizard (#0006)	A feisty Pokémon, it seeks out potential opponents and torments them in battle. It attacks by spewing fire from its mouth, swinging its tail around, or clawing away. Its fire turns bluish-white when it is excited.
Charizard Rizādon (リザードン) (0006)	Fire / Flying	Charmeleon (#0005)	Two Mega Evolutions; Gigantamax	Charizard is a playable character as a part of the "Pokémon Trainer" fighter in Super Smash Bros. Brawl and Super Smash Bros. Ultimate, a standalone fighter in Super Smash Bros. for Nintendo 3DS and Wii U, and the mascot of Pokémon Red and FireRed. Its fire is hot enough to melt boulders and glaciers, and it is known to start forest fires by accident, though it will not use it against weaker foes. The flame on its tail can burn underwater, and turns bluish-white if Charizard is angry. It gained two Mega Evolutions in generation VI, one Fire/Flying-type and one Fire/Dragon-type, and a Gigantamax form in generation VIII.
Squirtle Zenigame (ゼニガメ) (0007)	Water	—N/a	Wartortle (#0008)	It is a playable character in Super Smash Bros. Brawl and Super Smash Bros. Ultimate as a part of the "Pokémon Trainer" fighter, and one of Kanto's starter Pokémon. After it hatches, its back gradually swells and hardens into a shell. It withdraws into its shell for protection or to sleep, and its grooved, rounded shape reduce its water resistance, allowing it to swim faster. To attack, it sprays foamy water from its mouth.
Wartortle Kamēru (カメール) (0008)	Water	Squirtle (#0007)	Blastoise (#0009)	Because it is bigger and heavier than Squirtle, it has trouble walking, and has to use its furry ears and tail as rudders and balancing rods to swim. It withdraws into its shell to attack, defend itself, and sleep, though it cannot fully withdraw its tail. It is said to be able to live for up to 10,000 years. Older Wartortle have darker tail fur, and may have scars and algae on their shells.
Blastoise Kamekkusu (カメックス) (0009)	Water	Wartortle (#0008)	Mega Evolution; Gigantamax	It is the mascot of Pokémon Blue. The two cannons on its shell shoot out pressurized jets of water strong enough to shatter thick steel walls, and accurate enough to hit empty cans from over 160 feet away. Blastoise itself can tackle at high speeds. A cruel Pokémon, it deliberately makes itself heavier to withstand its cannons' recoil and crush its opponents. It gained a Mega Evolution in generation VI and a Gigantamax form in generation VIII. A Blastoise trading card, which was originally made as a test print before the commercial English cards, was sold for $360,000 in 2021.
Caterpie Kyatapī (キャタピー) (0010)	Bug	—N/a	Metapod (#0011)	Its feet have suction pads that allow it to climb slopes, walls, and trees. To protect itself, it releases a stench from its antennae. It camouflages itself in piles of leaves, or tries to scare predators with the eye patterns on its body. Across its life, it eats hundreds of leaves, some bigger than itself. When nearing evolution, it sheds its skin, covers itself with silk, and becomes a cocoon.
Metapod Toranseru (トランセル) (0011)	Bug	Caterpie (#0010)	Butterfree (#0012)	Though hard, Metapod's shell is said to be easy to break open, so it hardens it further when threatened to avoid spilling its thick, liquid innards. It waits for evolution while its cells restructure. Ume Aoki, a Japanese cartoonist who is famous for her work on the manga Hidamari Sketch and the anime Puella Magi Madoka Magica, utilizes a likeness of herself cosplaying as a Metapod in her drawn works.
Butterfree Batafurī (バタフリー) (0012)	Bug / Flying	Metapod (#0011)	Gigantamax	Its wings are covered in poisonous, water-repelling powder, which it uses to defend itself and fly in the rain. It goes from flower to flower to collect nectar, and rubs honey onto the hairs of its legs to carry back to its nest. It spreads its scales around to defend nearby Caterpie from predators. It competes with Cutiefly for territory. It gained a Gigantamax form in generation VIII.
Weedle Bīdoru (ビードル) (0013)	Bug / Poison	—N/a	Kakuna (#0014)	A common sight in forests and grassy areas, it has a two-inch poisonous stinger on its head, which it uses to defend itself. It has an acute sense of smell, being able to distinguish leaves it likes from those it dislikes with its big nose. It eats its weight in leaves every day.
Kakuna Kokūn (コクーン) (0014)	Bug / Poison	Weedle (#0013)	Beedrill (#0015)	Kakuna remains immobile, but can stick out its stinger in self-defense. The process of its cells' rearrangement raises its body temperature to the point of making it hot to the touch.
Beedrill Supiā (スピアー) (0015)	Bug / Poison	Kakuna (#0014)	Mega Evolution	Swarms of Beedrill set their nest in forests, and attack anything that goes near. It uses its three poisonous stingers to defeat its prey and carry them home. It gained a Mega Evolution in generation VI.
Pidgey Poppo (ポッポ) (0016)	Normal / Flying	—N/a	Pidgeotto (#0017)	A common and docile Pokémon, it prefers using flapping up sand in opponents' eyes over fighting. Its sense of direction allows it to return home from however far it may be.
Pidgeotto Pijon (ピジョン) (0017)	Normal / Flying	Pidgey (#0016)	Pidgeot (#0018)	A territorial species, it will peck and claw at its opponents. It uses its claws to carry prey like Exeggcute for over 60 miles. It flies in circles, keeping a lookout for prey.
Pidgeot Pijotto (ピジョット) (0018)	Normal / Flying	Pidgeotto (#0017)	Mega Evolution	Its wings are strong enough to fly at Mach 2 speed, whip up windstorms strong enough to bend trees, and fly up to 3,300 feet over the air. It skims over the water to hunt for unsuspecting fish Pokémon like Magikarp. Its glossy feathers make it a popular pick among trainers. It gained a Mega Evolution in generation VI.
Rattata Koratta (コラッタ) (0019)	Normal	—N/a	Raticate (#0020)	It will procreate and form nests anywhere that has enough food; each nest contains at least 40 Rattata. The colony spends entire days scavenging for food. A cautious species, it constantly listens around by moving its ears. Its incisor teeth do not stop growing, so it gnaws on hard objects, like table legs and door frames, to keep them ground down. Due to their commonness and habits of stealing food and gnawing on structures, it and Raticate are considered invasive species. Rattata has a Dark/Normal-type Alolan form.
Raticate Ratta (ラッタ) (0020)	Normal	Rattata (#0019)	—N/a	It uses its whiskers to maintain balance, and slows down if they are cut off. Its webbed hind feet act as flippers, allowing it to swim in rivers to hunt or escape from opponents. To keep its teeth ground down, it chews on anything, from machinery to concrete. Like Rattata, Raticate has a Dark/Normal-type Alolan form.
Spearow Onisuzume (オニスズメ) (0021)	Normal / Flying	—N/a	Fearow (#0022)	It can fly quickly, but is not adept at it. Its cries can be heard from a mile away, and it uses them to communicate with other Spearow. It flies around warmer climates, looking for bug Pokémon to eat.
Fearow Onidoriru (オニドリル) (0022)	Normal / Flying	Spearow (#0021)	—N/a	Drawings resembling Fearow can be seen ancient murals, implying that it has not evolved since ancient days. Its stamina lets it fly for an entire day, and its long neck and beak are convenient for plucking bug and fish Pokémon.
Ekans Ābo (アーボ) (0023)	Poison	—N/a	Arbok (#0024)	It uses its tongue to detect its surroundings and look for the scent for its prey. It wraps itself around trees to rest at night. If no trees are available, it coils to be able to respond from any given direction. It preys on bird Pokémon and their eggs and can stretch its jaw to swallow them whole, but eating something too big can leave it too heavy to move.
Arbok Ābokku (アーボック) (0024)	Poison	Ekans (#0023)	—N/a	The pattern under its head is similar to a face, and differs by region. Research has shown over 20 different patterns. Its coiling is strong enough to flatten oil drums, and its fangs are used to inject poison into its prey. It can use its pattern or hiss to intimidate opponents. If any part of its body besides its head is cut off, the rest of its body can grow back in weeks. It preys on smaller Pokémon like Wooper, or eggs of bird Pokémon like Pidgey and Spearow.
Pikachu Pikachū (ピカチュウ) (0025)	Electric	Pichu (#0172)	Raichu (#0026); Gigantamax	Pikachu is the primary mascot of the Pokémon franchise, as well as Pokémon Yellow and Let's Go, Pikachu!. It is also playable in every Super Smash Bros. game. It raises its tail to check its surroundings, but may be struck by a lightning bolt in this position. It gathers electricity from the atmosphere, and uses it to roast berries, communicate with other Electric-type Pokémon, and attack its opponents. Groups of Pikachu having their tails raised can inadvertedly cause lightning storms. Cramorant often swallow Pikachu by accident.
Raichu Raichū (ライチュウ) (0026)	Electric	Pikachu (#0025)	Two Mega Evolutions	Its tail can be used as a lightning rod to gather electricity, or as a ground to protect itself. It can store and eject up to 100,000 volts, enough to knock out a Copperajah. To avoid physically straining itself, it will discharge excess electricity into the ground, leaving its surroundings burned. Because it evolves via a stone and Pikachu is more popular, Raichu are rarely seen. It has an Electric/Psychic-type Alolan form. Both forms of Raichu were created by Atsuko Nishida.
Sandshrew Sando (サンド) (0027)	Ground	—N/a	Sandslash (#0028)	Based on the Chinese pangolin, Sandshrew is known to curl into a ball to defend itself. It burrows nests into the ground, and only digs back up to look for berries and hunt for bug Pokémon. Sandshrew has an Ice/Steel-type Alolan form.
Sandslash Sandopan (サンドパン) (0028)	Ground	Sandshrew (#0027)	—N/a	It can curl into a spiky ball to roll around, attack opponents, and protect itself from heatstroke or attacks. In addition to the spikes on its back, it can use its claws to attack and slash berries for its young. Like Sandshrew, it has an Ice/Steel-type Alolan form.
Nidoran♀ Nidoran♀ (ニドラン♀) (0029)	Poison	—N/a	Nidorina (#0030)	Eggs from both Nidoran lines can contain Nidoran of either gender. It is docile and unwilling to fight, but when encouraged, its horn and barbs can secrete poison. It uses its whiskers to check the wind for predators, and its incisors for chewing through berries.
Nidorina Nidorīna (ニドリーナ) (0030)	Poison	Nidoran♀ (#0029)	Nidoqueen (#0031)	Its horn grows slowly and it does not like fighting, but when forced to do so, it tends to resort to clawing and biting opponents. It lives in groups with others of its evolutionary line, and chews food for its young.
Nidoqueen Nidokuin (ニドクイン) (0031)	Poison / Ground	Nidorina (#0030)	—N/a	It is more defensively focused than its male counterpart, Nidoking. It can poison prey with its spikes, cause tremors, or knock opponents flying with tackles. It is protective of its children, carrying them in the gaps between its spines, and sealing its burrow. While around its young, its spikes do not secrete poison. Despite Pokédex and anime descriptions, it and Nidorina cannot breed, though Nidoran♀ can.
Nidoran♂ Nidoran♂ (ニドラン♂) (0032)	Poison	—N/a	Nidorino (#0033)	It flaps its ears around to detect potential opponents' footsteps. It injects poison into its prey with its horn. It lives with its female equivalent, and may risk its life to protect its female counterpart.
Nidorino Nidorīno (ニドリーノ) (0033)	Poison	Nidoran♂ (#0032)	Nidoking (#0034)	Its horn and the spikes around its body are laced with poison, and its horn is harder than diamond. It uses its horn to break rocks to find Moon Stones, which it uses to evolve.
Nidoking Nidokingu (ニドキング) (0034)	Poison / Ground	Nidorino (#0033)	—N/a	It is more offensively-focused than its female counterpart, Nidoqueen. Its tail can topple transmission towers and crush its opponents' bones, its horn can crush diamonds, and its hide is as hard as steel. If it begins to rampage, only a Nidoqueen it has lived with for a long time can calm it down.
Clefairy Pippi (ピッピ) (0035)	Fairy (Note: Prior to X and Y, Clefairy, Clefable, Jigglypuff, and Wigglytuff were pure Normal types while Mr. Mime was pure Psychic.)	Cleffa (#0173)	Clefable (#0036)	Timid creatures, they rarely come out, only appearing in groups to dance under a full moon. While dancing, the nearby area is enveloped in a magnetic field.
Clefable Pikushī (ピクシー) (0036)	Fairy	Clefairy (#0035)	Mega Evolution	It and Clefairy are said to have come from the moon, and spend full moon nights staring at it. Its hearing is acute, being able to hear pin drops from up to 1,100 yards away, so it lives in quiet mountainous areas. Its steps are light and floaty enough to allow it to walk on water.
Vulpix Rokon (ロコン) (0037)	Fire	—N/a	Ninetales (#0038)	When it is born, it has one white tail that sprouts into 6 curled ones at the tip as it gets older. It can freely control fire, creating will-o-wisps that are commonly mistaken for ghosts. Before it evolves, its tails glow hotter than usual. If not properly groomed, its tails will tangle up. If raised young, it will follow its trainer like a puppy. It has an Ice-type Alolan form. It has been selected as an "ambassador" for Hokkaido, and it and its Alolan form have been featured in the livery of an Air Do Boeing 767 aircraft.
Ninetales Kyūkon (キュウコン) (0038)	Fire	Vulpix (#0037)	—N/a	Its design is inspired by the nine-tailed fox of East Asian myth. It can understand human speech, use its psychic power to control minds, and curse anyone who mistreats it. According to legends, nine saints reincarnated as Ninetales, and each of its tails has a different ability. It has an Ice/Fairy-type Alolan form.
Jigglypuff Purin (プリン) (0039)	Normal / Fairy	Igglybuff (#0174)	Wigglytuff (#0040)	It is a playable character in every Super Smash Bros. game. It can inflate itself like a balloon to float around and it can sing. Its voice's wavelength can match the brain waves of sleeping people and Pokémon, lulling them to sleep. If the foe does not fall asleep, it can risk its life by singing until it runs out of air. It also keeps singing if the foe does fall asleep.
Wigglytuff Pukurin (プクリン) (0040)	Normal / Fairy	Jigglypuff (#0039)	—N/a	By inhaling air, it can inflate itself to up to 20 times its size, and float around. It does so to scare opponents away or compete with other Wigglytuff.
Zubat Zubatto (ズバット) (0041)	Poison / Flying	—N/a	Golbat (#0042)	Zubat has evolved to not have eyes or nostrils, so it uses echolocation to find its way. It hides in dark places while the sun is out, as its skin is sensitive to bright lights. Groups of Zubat will gather around in the cold to heat each other's bodies.
Golbat Gorubatto (ゴルバット) (0042)	Poison / Flying	Zubat (#0041)	Crobat (#0169)	Its fangs are hollow like straws. It uses them to stab through the hide of its prey, but may break them when trying to bite a Steel-type Pokémon. It may sometimes suck so much blood that its blood type changes to that of its prey, and its weight leaves it unable to fly, making it easy prey.
Oddish Nazonokusa (ナゾノクサ) (0043)	Grass / Poison	—N/a	Gloom (#0044)	It buries itself in the soil to absorb the nutrients and to sleep during the day. If pulled out, it starts screaming. A nocturnal Pokémon, it wanders around to scatter seeds and absorb moonlight. It is one of the few species with a scientific name; "Oddium Wanderus".
Gloom Kusaihana (クサイハナ) (0044)	Grass / Poison	Oddish (#0043)	Vileplume (#0045); Bellossom (#0182)	Its leaves and the drool-like nectar on its mouth smell rancid enough to cause fainting in a mile-wide radius, though some people enjoy the smell, and some use it to produce perfume. It amplifies the odor when in danger, and stops emitting it when safe.
Vileplume Rafureshia (ラフレシア) (0045)	Grass / Poison	Gloom (#0044)	—N/a	Vileplume's large petals can be shaken or forcibly bloomed to release clouds of pollen that poison and paralyze anything near it, which it uses to weaken its prey before eating it. Walking around causes it to spread pollen around, turning the air around it yellow.
Paras Parasu (パラス) (0046)	Bug / Grass	—N/a	Parasect (#0047)	Paras has tochukaso mushrooms growing on its back. They drain nutrients from the host and control it into draining nutrients from trees. Their spores can be used to make medicine. In Alola, those spores do not grow properly.
Parasect Parasekuto (パラセクト) (0047)	Bug / Grass	Paras (#0046)	—N/a	The tochukaso mushrooms have completely drained the Paras's body of its nutrients and taken it over. Groups of Parasect will gather around a tree, suck the nutrients out of it, and move to the next tree when it dies. Its spores can be made into medicine. Parasect in Alola are known to compete with Shiinotic, and have lower-quality spores. The bug is mostly dead, so removing the mushroom causes it to stop moving entirely.
Venonat Konpan (コンパン) (0048)	Bug / Poison	—N/a	Venomoth (#0049)	It uses its compounded eyes as a radar to locate prey in the dark, and can shoot light beams from them. It hunts for small bug Pokémon at night.
Venomoth Morufon (モルフォン) (0049)	Bug / Poison	Venonat (#0048)	—N/a	Its wings have scales that leak venom when in contact with its opponent's skin. Lighter scales can cause paralysis, and darker ones are poisonous. A nocturnal Pokémon, it goes out at night to hunt for prey. It is attracted to bright lights.
Diglett Diguda (ディグダ) (0050)	Ground	—N/a	Dugtrio (#0051)	Some farmers like to use Diglett and Dugtrio to plough the soil for crops to grow, and some consider them pests for eating crops. No one has ever seen the full body of a Diglett. It has a Ground/Steel-type Alolan form.
Dugtrio Dagutorio (ダグトリオ) (0051)	Ground	Diglett (#0050)	—N/a	Dugtrio is a three-headed Diglett. It can burrow at a speed of 60 miles per hour, and up to 60 miles underground. Like Diglett, no one has ever seen its full body. Occasionally, they will fight over which head gets to eat first. Like Diglett, Dugtrio has a Ground/Steel-type Alolan form.
Meowth Nyāsu (ニャース) (0052)	Normal	—N/a	Persian (#0053) (Note: Galarian Meowth (introduced in Pokémon Sword and Shield) are capable of evolving into Perrserker.); Gigantamax	One of the main members of Team Rocket in the Pokémon anime series. Meowth withdraws its claws into its paws to sneak around without leaving footsteps. It loves round and shiny objects, coins being its favorite toys, which it will play with until it falls asleep. It sleeps during the daytime, and patrols its territory during the night, looking for loose change. It tends to fight with Murkrow over shiny objects. Giving coins to a Meowth can make it friendlier, but no less fickle. Meowth has a Dark-type Alolan form, and a Steel-type Galarian form, which evolves into Perrserker. It gained a Gigantamax form in generation VIII. Meowth is a popular Pokémon among fans of the series, primarily due to its role on the villainous organization Team Rocket. It has widely been used in promotion for the series.
Persian Perushian (ペルシアン) (0053)	Normal	Meowth (#0052)	—N/a	Its fur and jewel make it popular with the rich, but its fickle, uncaring attitude makes it hard to raise. Though it will attack anyone without provocation, including its trainer, pulling on its whiskers will temporarily make it docile. It has a Dark-type Alolan form, and a Galarian counterpart in Perrserker, whose barbaric habits clash with both Persian's elegance and ego. A Persian is owned by Team Rocket's leader Giovanni in the Pokémon anime series.
Psyduck Kodakku (コダック) (0054)	Water	—N/a	Golduck (#0055)	It has constant headaches. When they worsen, normally inactive brain cells activate, causing it to accidentally unleash psychic energy. It then forgets that it used those powers.
Golduck Gorudakku (ゴルダック) (0055)	Water	Psyduck (#0054)	—N/a	It was almost hunted to extinction by hunters wanting the jewel on its forehead, believing it would grant them supernatural powers. Its psychic abilities are superior to Psyduck's. It swims effortlessly, even in rough, stormy seas. It is known to rescue people from wrecked ships.
Mankey Mankī (マンキー) (0056)	Fighting	—N/a	Primeape (#0057)	Nearly anything will anger it, and when it gets angry, it will immediately attack, giving its opponent no time to flee. If it does flee or is left alone, the loneliness will make it angrier. If one Mankey in a colony gets mad, the rest will rampage with it.
Primeape Okorizaru (オコリザル) (0057)	Fighting	Mankey (#0056)	Annihilape (#0979)	Getting angry causes Primeape's blood to rush faster than usual, tightening its body muscles, but making it dumber. Any form of stimuli will anger it, even while it is asleep. It can get so angry that it dies as a result, but looks peaceful in death.
Growlithe Gādi (ガーディ) (0058)	Fire	—N/a	Arcanine (#0059)	Growlithe are friendly, loyal, and have a strong sense of smell, making them popular as guard and police dogs. It will remain motionless until it is given an order by its Trainer. Growlithe bones have been found in ruins from the Stone Age, implying that humans have used them since then. It is based on the Shisa. It has a Fire/Rock-type Hisuian form.
Arcanine Uindi (ウインディ) (0059)	Fire	Growlithe (#0058)	—N/a	Arcanine is a fan-favorite Pokémon and has been described as having "the mane of a lion... the stripes of a tiger [and] the speed of a panther". It has been admired since the past for its beauty. It runs agilely as if on wings. Arcanine is known for its great speed, as it is said to be capable of running over 6,200 miles in a single day and night. The fire that blazes within Arcanine's body is its source of power. Legends tell of its fighting alongside a general and conquering a whole country. There are so many old tales about them that Arcanine is spoken of and categorized in the Pokédex as the Legendary Pokémon, though it is a common wild Pokémon. Like Growlithe, it has a Fire/Rock-type Hisuian form.
Poliwag Nyoromo (ニョロモ) (0060)	Water	—N/a	Poliwhirl (#0061)	Due to its underdeveloped legs, it is not good at standing or walking, so it prefers swimming, though its trainer should train it to walk every day. Despite the danger, it wants to come up on land, so it does its best to waddle along, but when an enemy finds it, it rushes back to the water. Poliwag's thin skin leaves its spiraling innards visible. If the swirl is tinged white, that means Poliwag is sick. Despite its thinness, its skin is flexible and slimy, so even sharp fangs bounce off of it. The direction of its spiral tends to differ by area. Poliwag experts can tell them apart at a glance. In rivers with fast-flowing water, it will cling to a rock by using its lips, which act like a suction cup.
Poliwhirl Nyorozo (ニョロゾ) (0061)	Water	Poliwag (#0060)	Poliwrath (#0062); Politoed (#0186)	Poliwhirl is among the most-marketed Pokémon. It can live in or out of the water, but prefers living in water where, it has fewer natural enemies and more plentiful prey. When out of water, it constantly sweats so its body is always wet and slick with an oily fluid. Because of this, it can easily slip out of the clutches of its enemies. Its health suffers when its skin dries out, so trainers have to keep it moist. It goes on land in search of bug Pokémon, then takes them underwater so it can safely eat them. The spiral pattern on its belly subtly moves, and staring at it for too long can lead children and Pokémon to sleep.
Poliwrath Nyorobon (ニョロボン) (0062)	Water / Fighting	Poliwhirl (#0061)	—N/a	A skilled swimmer, it can outswim professional athletes with ease, and children imitate its movements to learn to swim. It is also skilled in martial arts, and strong enough to punch boulders into dust. Despite being adapted to life in water, it chooses to live in dry land.
Abra Kēshii (ケーシィ) (0063)	Psychic	—N/a	Kadabra (#0064)	Even when sleeping, which Abra does for most of its life, it can sense danger with its highly potent psychic power. When it is in danger, it will teleport to safety. Its powers may be affected by what it is dreaming about.
Kadabra Yungerā (ユンゲラー) (0064)	Psychic	Abra (#0063)	Alakazam (#0065)	In November 2000, Israeli magician Uri Geller sued Nintendo, claiming Kadabra embodies an unauthorized appropriation of his identity. However, in 2020, he released a claim that Nintendo could use Kadabra in cards again. Some Kadabra are theorized to have once been human children who could not control their powers. Its psychic powers can cause clocks to run backwards, or other devices to stop functioning.
Alakazam Fūdin (フーディン) (0065)	Psychic	Kadabra (#0064)	Mega Evolution	Its brain cells multiply infinitely with age, amplifying its psychic powers and allowing it to remember everything since its hatching as an Abra. Its muscles are weak, so it lifts its body with its psychic powers. It may give its spoons to someone it trusts. It gained a Mega Evolution in generation VI.
Machop Wanrikī (ワンリキー) (0066)	Fighting	—N/a	Machoke (#0067)	Machop's muscles never get sore. It trains itself by lifting Graveler. Stronger, more confident Machop will compete with Makuhita.
Machoke Gōrikī (ゴーリキー) (0067)	Fighting	Machop (#0066)	Machamp (#0068)	Machoke is typically used for heavy lifting jobs due to its strength. Its belt regulates its power, and it only removes it when faced with a particularly powerful opponent.
Machamp Kairikī (カイリキー) (0068)	Fighting	Machoke (#0067)	Gigantamax	Machamp has four arms. It can throw around 500 punches in one second and move mountains with one arm. It has poor reflexes and dexterity, with its arms reacting faster than Machamp can think, and getting tangled up when doing delicate tasks. As with Machoke, its belt regulates its power, with more destructive consequences when removed. It gained a Gigantamax form in generation VIII.
Bellsprout Madatsubomi (マダツボミ) (0069)	Grass / Poison	—N/a	Weepinbell (#0070)	It can plant itself into the ground to absorb moisture, but is unable to move while rooted. It can spit acid from its mouth.
Weepinbell Utsudon (ウツドン) (0070)	Grass / Poison	Bellsprout (#0069)	Victreebel (#0071)	It has a hook on its rear-end that it hooks on trees with and sleeps, but it may fall off if it moves around too much. If it cannot dissolve its prey with acid, it will cut them with its sharp leaves.
Victreebel Utsubotto (ウツボット) (0071)	Grass / Poison	Weepinbell (#0070)	Mega Evolution	Groups of Victreebel wait in temperate forests for unsuspecting prey to walk into their mouths, mistaking their acid for nectar. The more prey it has consumed, the sweeter its acid smells.
Tentacool Menokurage (メノクラゲ) (0072)	Water / Poison	—N/a	Tentacruel (#0073)	It is 99% composed of water, with the other 1% being an organ that generates poison. If its tentacles are broken off, they can grow back quickly. Its body shrivels up while outside of water, but its poison does not. Though it is visually similar to Toedscool, the two species are not biologically related.
Tentacruel Dokukurage (ドククラゲ) (0073)	Water / Poison	Tentacool (#0072)	—N/a	Its 80 tentacles can grow back or shrink at will, and it uses them to constrict its prey while immobilizing it with poison. While rare, Tentacruel tend to hunt in groups. Though it is visually similar to Toedscruel, the two species are not biologically related.
Geodude Ishitsubute (イシツブテ) (0074)	Rock / Ground	—N/a	Graveler (#0075)	Geodude are proud of their hard bodies, showing them off or competing with Roggenrola, Carbink, or other Geodude to see who is the hardest. Groups of Geodude sit still in mountainous routes, so unsuspecting people often mistake them for ordinary rocks. It has a Rock/Electric-type Alolan form.
Graveler Gorōn (ゴローン) (0075)	Rock / Ground	Geodude (#0074)	Golem (#0076)	It tumbles down mountains for transportation or fun, breaking most of what it crashes into. It does not mind if pieces of itself fall or are scraped off, as they can grow back. It has a Rock/Electric-type Alolan form.
Golem Gorōnya (ゴローニャ) (0076)	Rock / Ground	Graveler (#0075)	—N/a	It sheds its skin once a year to grow, which in turn crumbles into nutritious soil. It can withdraw its head and limbs into its hollow shell to roll around and down mountains, trampling whatever it passes through. To avoid crushing property, people dig grooves into mountains to guide it. Older Golem stop shedding and have moss growing on their shells. It has a Rock/Electric-type Alolan form.
Ponyta Ponīta (ポニータ) (0077)	Fire	—N/a	Rapidash (#0078)	When born, it cannot stand properly and runs with its parents to strengthen its legs. It can choose when its flames can burn people or not. It has a Psychic-type Galarian form.
Rapidash Gyaroppu (ギャロップ) (0078)	Fire	Ponyta (#0077)	—N/a	As a popular Pokémon, Rapidash is considered "universally appealing" to fans of cute and cool Pokémon alike. Both Ponyta and Rapidash can enable their body's flames to be harmful or harmless as seen in the anime. A competitive Pokémon, if it sees anything faster than it, such as a car or another Pokémon, it will run at up to 150 mph to try to outrun it. At that point, its hooves barely touch the ground. It can traverse all of Hisui in a day and a half. The faster it goes, the longer its mane becomes. Otherwise, it can be seen cantering in fields. It has a Psychic/Fairy-type Galarian form.
Slowpoke Yadon (ヤドン) (0079)	Water / Psychic	—N/a	Slowbro (#0080); Slowking (#0199)	Slowpoke is dumb and lazy, to the point of taking up to five seconds to process pain. It lives on the edges of bodies of water and uses its tail to fish for prey, but may take a day to notice that its tail has already been bitten off. Some cultures believe its yawns bring rain, and worship it. It evolves into Slowbro when a Shellder bites its tail, or into Slowking when it bites its head. It has a Psychic-type Galarian form.
Slowbro Yadoran (ヤドラン) (0080)	Water / Psychic	Slowpoke (#0079)	Mega Evolution	Slowpoke has fished up a Shellder with its tail, which shocked it into evolving and made it stand on two legs. The Shellder has transformed into a spiral-shaped shell to suck more sweet fluids from the Slowbro's tail. If the Shellder were to detach itself from Slowbro in any way, it will devolve back to Slowpoke. Being slow-witted to begin with, the Slowbro does not feel pain in its tail because of Shellder's seeping poison. Since its tail has been bitten by Shellder, it has to grudgingly swim for prey instead. Whenever Shellder bites harder on its tail, it gives Slowbro a flash of inspiration, which it forgets a moment later. Its Kantonian form gained a Mega Evolution in generation VI. It has a Poison/Psychic-type Galarian form.
Magnemite Koiru (コイル) (0081)	Electric / Steel (Note: Prior to Gold and Silver, Magnemite and Magneton were pure Electric types.)	—N/a	Magneton (#0082)	The two magnets on its side are used for discharging attacks and floating. It is attracted to electromagnetic waves from devices such as Pokégears, and attaches itself to power breakers. Power outages not caused by storms could be the result of a colony of Magnemite feeding on it. It becomes incapable of flight if it out of electricity. The two magnets on its side are powerful enough to draw in iron objects from up to 300 feet away, and get stronger the faster they spin. Touching it while it is eating electricity will give a full body shock. Its numbers have been decreasing because most modern power lines are buried under the ground. Magnemite has ranked highly on multiple Japanese polls In a 2008 poll of Japanese children, it placed second, which Magmix writer Katano explained was due to Internet trolls. Katano suggested that its placement in this poll contributed to it becoming a more popular Pokémon. It was called the "First Coil Shock" (in reference to its Japanese name "Coil"), and two subsequent polls related to other franchises have been dubbed the "Second Coil Shock" and "Third Coil Shock".
Magneton Reakoiru (レアコイル) (0082)	Electric / Steel	Magnemite (#0081)	Magnezone (#0462)	Formed when several Magnemite fuse together, it tends to raise the temperature up by 3.6 °F within 3,600 ft (1,100 m). It generates strange radio signals. Groups of Magneton tend to gather where sun flares happen. Exposure to one can cause earaches. Its magnetism is so powerful it dries up moisture in its vicinity, and is potentially fatal to devices like TVs. As a result, large cities have sirens to warn their citizens of Magneton appearances, and trainers are warned to keep Magneton inside their Poké Balls. When it evolves, the Magnemite's brains link up, though they do not become three times smarter. When rain clouds form, they like to gather in high spots where lightning could strike. Sandy Shocks appears to be an ancient relative of it.
Farfetch'd Kamonegi (カモネギ) (0083)	Normal / Flying	No evolution (Note: Only Galarian Farfetch'd (introduced in Pokémon Sword and Shield) are capable of evolving into Sirfetch'd.)		It carries around a green onion stalk like a sword. It apparently knows where the best ones are and will fight other Farfetch'd over them. In emergencies, it will eat them, and then run off to find a new one. Farfetch'd were so rare at one point that people bred them to regrow the population. Since it cannot live without it, it will defend its stalk with its life. It has a Fighting-type Galarian form.
Doduo Dōdō (ドードー) (0084)	Normal / Flying	—N/a	Dodrio (#0085)	Its short wings make flying difficult, so it has instead become a powerful runner, being able to reach speeds of 60 mph. Both heads have identical brains, though it is believed that some Doduo have different brains. It raises and lowers its heads to maintain balance while running. One head will stay on alert while the other sleeps.
Dodrio Dōdorio (ドードリオ) (0085)	Normal / Flying	Doduo (#0084)	—N/a	The head with the thickest neck is deemed the leader, and has control over the body. The three heads express joy, sorrow, and anger as they plan strategies together. If they cannot agree on something to do or overthink their plans, they will be unable to move. When two heads sleep, one head remains awake. It has three hearts and six lungs, giving it increased endurance, so while it is slower than Doduo, it can run for longer periods of time.
Seel Pauwau (パウワウ) (0086)	Water	—N/a	Dewgong (#0087)	It loves swimming around in 14 °F waters. Its horn is hard enough to bash its way through ice. It has a thick hide covered in warm fur. It goes in waters up to -40 °F. Though not a great walker, it is a skilled swimmer. It closes its nostrils when it swims. In the daytime, it can be found sleeping on the seabed of shallow waters. Their presence in the Alolan climate is considered a mystery.
Dewgong Jugon (ジュゴン) (0087)	Water / Ice	Seel (#0086)	—N/a	Dewgong can store thermal energy in its body to withstand cold temperatures. At night, it hunts for prey like Wishiwashi, and during the day, it sleeps on ice or shallow water, or sunbathes on beaches. A fisherman once mistook a Dewgong on an iceberg for a mermaid.
Grimer Betobetā (ベトベター) (0088)	Poison	—N/a	Muk (#0089)	Being mostly composed of poisonous filth, it can squeeze into sewage pipes with ease. Grimer lived mostly in urban cities, factories, and lakes, where it could find waste to consume, though environmental improvements have caused its population to start dwindling. It has a Poison/Dark-type Alolan form.
Muk Betobeton (ベトベトン) (0089)	Poison	Grimer (#0088)	—N/a	It is based on the dorotabō, a one-eyed, three-fingered yōkai that rises from the mud of neglected, overgrown rice fields. Muk is covered in a toxic filthy sludge so vile that any land it walks through becomes inhospitable for up to three years. A drop of its body fluid can turn a pool rancid or leave a person bedridden for days. Its nose has devolved, so it cannot smell anything. It feeds on anything repugnant and filthy, like sewer water. Its numbers have started declining since people have begun cleaning up towns, and because some people think it may go extinct, sludge pools are being built to prevent this. Like Grimer, it has a Poison/Dark-type Alolan form.
Shellder Sherudā (シェルダー) (0090)	Water	—N/a	Cloyster (#0091)	Tugging on its tongue, which is always sticking out, will startle it into opening its shell. It opens and closes its shell in rapid succession to propel itself backwards. Shellder have been known to seek out Slowpoke's tails, inadvertently causing them to evolve into Slowbro. Biting its head will instead cause it to evolve into Slowking. It and Cloyster are related to the Shellos line.
Cloyster Parushen (パルシェン) (0091)	Water / Ice	Shellder (#0090)	—N/a	It normally keeps its shell closed unless it is attacking. It uses the same projectile system — swallowing seawater and ejecting it from the front or rear — to shoot its spikes and swim. Its internal anatomy has yet to be seen.
Gastly Gōsu (ゴース) (0092)	Ghost / Poison	—N/a	Haunter (#0093)	It hides under structures to stop the wind from blowing away its gaseous body. It engulfs prey of any size with its gas, poisoning it through its skin or suffocating it.
Haunter Gōsuto (ゴースト) (0093)	Ghost / Poison	Gastly (#0092)	Gengar (#0094)	Because of its ability to slip through walls, Haunter is said to be from another dimension. It saps its victims' life by licking them with its cold, gaseous tongue. Those licked by it grow weaker with each passing day, shaking uncontrollably until they die. If one trips and falls for no apparent reason or hear a sound when no one is around, it may be a Haunter. Because it fears the light and revels in the dark, it may be on the verge of extinction in cities that stay brightly lit at night. On moonless nights, Haunter searches for someone to curse.
Gengar Gengā (ゲンガー) (0094)	Ghost / Poison	Haunter (#0093)	Mega Evolution Gigantamax Form	Gengar seeps into the shadows of people and Pokémon to scare them for fun or eat their life force. A sudden chill of 10 °F or cooler may be a Gengar trying to curse someone. Gengar will lurk in whatever dark corner of a room it can find and wait for its chance to catch its prey. It likes to attack people in mountains. Sometimes, Gengar will pose as people's shadows. It apparently wishes for a traveling companion. Since it may have once been human, it tries to create one by taking the lives of other humans. Initially created by Satoshi Tajiri and Ken Sugimori, it has become one of the most popular Pokémon, placing tenth on the Google Pokémon of the Year 2020 poll. Kotaku's Zack Zwiezen said Gengar was "one of [their] favorite gen 1 designs", calling it a "great design [because] it's simple, yet not boring or generic". Gengar has appeared in many Pokémon spin-offs or crossovers, including Pokkén Tournament and Pokémon Unite. It gained a Mega Evolution in generation VI and a Gigantamax form in generation VIII.
Onix Iwāku (イワーク) (0095)	Rock / Ground	—N/a	Steelix (#0208)	It usually lives underground. As it grows, the stone portions of its body harden to become similar to a diamond, but colored black. Despite its large body being over 26 feet long, it can squirm its way through the ground at 50 mph. As it digs through the ground, it eats hard objects, which makes its body more solid. Diglett may use the tunnels it burrows as homes. Onix has a magnet in its brain, which acts as a compass so that it does not lose direction while it is tunneling. As it grows older, its body becomes increasingly rounder and smoother. It evolves into Steelix when traded while holding a Metal Coat. While its Defense and Speed are high, Onix' other values are deceptively low, making it a relatively weak Rock-type choice compared to Golem and Rhydon.
Drowzee Surīpu (スリープ) (0096)	Psychic	—N/a	Hypno (#0097)	Drowzee's design is based on the dream-eating tapir Baku. It puts people to sleep with its hypnotism and eats their dreams through their noses. It can get sick from eating nightmares. If one sleeps by it frequently, it might show them dreams it ate in the past. If someone has forgotten their dreams, Drowzee may have eaten them. It remembers every dream it has eaten, and rarely eats the dreams of adults because children's are tastier.
Hypno Surīpā (スリーパー) (0097)	Psychic	Drowzee (#0096)	—N/a	Hypno's design is based on the dream-eating tapir Baku and a hypnotist. Hypno holds a pendulum in its hand. Allegedly, there once was an incident in which it took away a child it hypnotized. When hungry, it puts humans it meets to sleep, then feasts on their dreams and carries away anyone having good dreams. Hypno sometimes aid doctors in putting patients to sleep, but other members of the species enjoy feasting on good dreams and kidnap those who have them. In the Alola region, Hypno prey on Komala instead, preferring their dreams over those of humans. Since its inception, Hypno has been regarded for its dark backstory, primarily its child-abducting tendencies. Its humanoid design has been cited as creepy, and a reason why its design was considered unappealing. Hypno's child abducting tendencies resulted in a popular creepypasta, dubbed "Hypno's Lullaby" being created in the early 2010s, which centered around a song focusing on Hypno as a child thief. Hypno's Lullaby was adapted into several playable adaptations, notably ROM hacks.
Krabby Kurabu (クラブ) (0098)	Water	—N/a	Kingler (#0099)	Krabby and Kingler live near the edge of water, usually in beaches. It can shroud its body in foam to look bigger than it is. If damaged or lost in battle, its pincers grow back quickly, though it has trouble balancing without them.
Kingler Kingurā (キングラー) (0099)	Water	Krabby (#0098)	Gigantamax	Its left claw has grown twice as big as its right, and is now strong enough to break Cloyster shells open. However, swinging it can cause balancing issues and tire it out. Kingler are said to communicate with each other by waving their pincers around. It gained a Gigantamax form in generation VIII.
Voltorb Biriridama (ビリリダマ) (0100)	Electric	—N/a	Electrode (#0101)	It is believed that Voltorb was created when a Poké Ball was hit with an energy pulse. When agitated or tapped, it will explode. Sometimes, humans will mistake a stray Voltorb for a Poké Ball, touch it, and get shocked or exploded. It has an Electric/Grass-type Hisuian form.
Electrode Marumain (マルマイン) (0101)	Electric	Voltorb (#0100)	—N/a	Electrode resembles an upside-down Poké Ball, though its actual relation to them has yet to be confirmed. Unlike Voltorb, it can control its explosions, but will still explode at any time and for any reason. Groups of Electrode live in power plants and eat their electricity, causing blackouts. Like Voltorb, it has an Electric/Grass-type Hisuian form.
Exeggcute Tamatama (タマタマ) (0102)	Grass / Psychic	—N/a	Exeggutor (#0103)	Though it may look like eggs, Exeggcute are actually clusters of seeds. When cracks increasingly appear on the seeds, Exeggcute is close to evolution. When disturbed, they quickly gather and attack in swarms. If one is separated from the group, the six will quickly regroup with telepathy. Although they are the same size as others, Alolan Exeggcute are heavier than others, as their shells are packed full. They are often hunted by Pidgeotto and Crabrawler, but uses psychokinesis to drive it off.
Exeggutor Nasshī (ナッシー) (0103)	Grass / Psychic	Exeggcute (#0102)	—N/a	It is a coconut tree-esque Pokémon based on the jinmenju, and the favorite Pokémon of Tsunekazu Ishihara, president and CEO of The Pokémon Company, having used it throughout the debugging phase of Pokémon Red and Green. Its three heads think independently of each other, and become unable to act if they disagree on what to do. They communicate via telepathy. Sometimes, one of the heads grows so big that it falls off and becomes an Exeggcute. Its cries are noisy due to each head thinking about something else. Exeggutor are friendly, and only engage their enemies with psychic power when they need to. It has a Grass/Dragon-type Alolan form.
Cubone Karakara (カラカラ) (0104)	Ground	—N/a	Marowak (#0105)	Cubone wears the skull of its deceased mother. Since it never removes said skull, no one has ever seen Cubone's real face. The stains on the skull it wears are made by the tears it sheds. When it thinks of its deceased mother, it weeps loudly, and Mandibuzz that hear its cries will attack it from the air. Its name is a combination of "cub" and "bone".
Marowak Garagara (ガラガラ) (0105)	Ground	Cubone (#0104)	—N/a	The bone it holds is its key weapon. It throws the bone like a boomerang to knock out targets. Originally a Cubone, it overcame its mother's death and became rough and aggressive. Some say that a Marowak graveyard exists somewhere in the world. It carries out vengeance on its natural enemy, Mandibuzz, as it throws bones to try to take it down. They thump their bones rhythmically to communicate among themselves, with nearly 50 different rhythmic patterns. It has a Ghost/Fire-type Alolan form.
Hitmonlee Sawamurā (サワムラー) (0106)	Fighting	Tyrogue (#0236)	—N/a	Hitmonlee's design is based on headless men. It may also be based on Kabandha. Its English name is derived from actor and martial artist Bruce Lee, while its Japanese name is derived from kickboxer Tadashi Sawamura. When in a hurry, its legs strengthen progressively. Its balance lets it attack from any stance. Some call it the "Kick Master". After a battle, it rubs down its springy legs to overcome fatigue. Its legs can stretch to double its length. Hitmonlee and Hitmonchan did not have a distinct evolutionary line until Tyrogue and Hitmontop were conceived. Hitmonlee evolves from Tyrogue if it has higher Attack than Defense.
Hitmonchan Ebiwarā (エビワラー) (0107)	Fighting	Tyrogue (#0236)	—N/a	Its English name is derived from actor and martial artist Jackie Chan, while its Japanese name is derived from boxer Hiroyuki Ebihara. It can punch fast enough to slice air and hard enough to break rocks, though it needs to rest for a couple minutes after doing so. It winds it arms to punch harder, and punches in a corkscrew fashion. A Hitmonchan is said to possess the spirit of a boxer who had been working towards a world championship. It evolves from Tyrogue if it has higher Defense than Attack.
Lickitung Beroringa (ベロリンガ) (0108)	Normal	—N/a	Lickilicky (#0463)	Instead of its hands, it uses its long, prehensile tongue. It paralyzes bug Pokémon by licking them, and eats them whole. If not immediately washed, its licks can cause itchy rashes. Its tongue can stretch up to 6 inches, and when it does, its tail quivers and contracts. It has nerves that run through its tongue, so it can use it freely. It licks filthy things to clean them, but its saliva is still smelly and grimy, so they do not end up much cleaner. Whenever Lickitung comes across something new, it licks it to memorize the taste and texture of that thing. When its saliva is boiled, it becomes a strong adhesive.
Koffing Dogāsu (ドガース) (0109)	Poison	—N/a	Weezing (#0110)	Koffing is based on air pollution and meteorites. It mixes its toxins with the rotting trash it eats to make poisonous gases. Sometimes, it can over-inflate itself and explode.
Weezing Matadogasu (マタドガス) (0110)	Poison	Koffing (#0109)	—N/a	Said to form when two Koffing fuse. Weezing will nest in unkept, unsanitary places, usually houses, and raid their trash. Its two heads have different toxins, and it makes its poisonous gas stronger and smellier by pushing it between said heads. It has a Poison/Fairy-type Galarian form. Despite this, Kantonian Weezing were once a common sight in Galar, and produced stronger gases than other regions' Weezing.
Rhyhorn Saihōn (サイホーン) (0111)	Ground / Rock	—N/a	Rhydon (#0112)	Because it is not good at turning, Rhyhorn runs in a straight line, destroying anything in its way. Though it can knock a block of steel down without much care, its head may be sore the next day. Its massive bones are 1,000 times harder than those of humans, and it can easily send a trailer flying. As a Pokémon with a one-track mind, when it starts running, it will not stop until it falls asleep. Rhyhorn's brain is so small and dense that it usually forgets why it may be running.
Rhydon Saidon (サイドン) (0112)	Ground / Rock	Rhyhorn (#0111)	Rhyperior (#0464)	Rhydon was the first Pokémon created by Game Freak. Unlike Rhyhorn, it is bipedal. Protected by an armor-like hide, it can survive in lava over 3,600 °F (1,980 °C) and take direct hits from cannonballs. By rapidly rotating its drill-like horn, it can punch holes through boulders and diamonds, while one sweep of its tail can topple a building. Its brain developed when it began walking on its hind legs.
Chansey Rakkī (ラッキー) (0113)	Normal	Happiny (#0440)	Blissey (#0242)	The eggs it carries in its pouch can heal its eaters and make them happier. For this reason, they are often employed in Pokémon Centers.
Tangela Monjara (モンジャラ) (0114)	Grass	—N/a	Tangrowth (#0465)	Its whole body is covered with thick blue vines, concealing its identity. It will tangle and get entangled with nearly anything. Tangela's vines snap off painlessly and easily if they are grabbed, allowing it to escape. The lost vines grow back the next day. The vines of a Tangela have a distinct scent, and in some parts of Galar, are used as herbs.
Kangaskhan Garūra (ガルーラ) (0115)	Normal	—N/a	Mega Evolution	The female raises its young in its belly pouch for around three years, and during this time, the baby rarely ventures out. The young leaves home once it learns to find food, and its mother begins to miss it. To avoid crushing the baby, it sleeps standing up. A young Kangaskhan playing on its own is not to be disturbed or caught, as its mother will be supervising it. There are records of a lost human child being raised by a childless Kangaskhan. They live in groups. It gained a Mega Evolution in generation VI.
Horsea Tattsū (タッツー) (0116)	Water	—N/a	Seadra (#0117)	Horsea and Seadra are based on seahorses. It feeds on bug Pokémon and moss. It can fire water from its mouth to attack foes in or out of water, or ink to deter attackers. By spinning its body, it can create whirlpools.
Seadra Shīdora (シードラ) (0117)	Water	Horsea (#0116)	Kingdra (#0230)	It can swim in any direction by flapping its fins and tail. It creates whirlpools to exhaust its prey, and eats it whole. Male Seadra will take care of newborn Horsea. While doing so, the poison on the tips of its fins becomes thicker and stronger than usual.
Goldeen Tosakinto (トサキント) (0118)	Water	—N/a	Seaking (#0119)	Goldeen and Seaking are based on goldfish. Goldeen was originally intended to have a pre-evolution called "Gyopin", but it was cut from the game due to a lack of cartridge space. If kept in an aquarium, it will use its horn to break out. Swimmers have to be careful in water, so that Goldeen do not ram into them.
Seaking Azumaō (アズマオウ) (0119)	Water	Goldeen (#0118)	—N/a	Seaking is known to be able to swim against streams and up waterfalls. It will use its horn to bore holes into rocks to lay eggs in. Fans of Seaking's horn and fins are known to fight each other.
Staryu Hitodeman (ヒトデマン) (0120)	Water	—N/a	Starmie (#0121)	It is a basic Pokémon which resembles a starfish with a mechanical center on its body, housing a red jewel. This organ is known as its core. As long as the jewel is unharmed, it can regenerate the rest of its body.
Starmie Sutāmī (スターミー) (0121)	Water / Psychic	Staryu (#0120)	Mega Evolution	Starmie has a second star on its back, which is semi-attached and able to spin around independently of the front star. Starmie has a red jewel core, which resembles a cut precious stone and seems to shine with the seven colors of the rainbow when looked at from different angles, but usually shows up red more than any other color. It can also emit electrical waves from its core powerful enough to reach the furthest parts of the universe.
Mr. Mime Bariyādo (バリヤード) (0122)	Psychic / Fairy	Mime Jr. (#0439)	data-sort-value="" style="background: var(--background-color-interactive, #ececec); color: var(--color-base, inherit); vertical-align: middle; text-align: center; " class="table-na" | —N/a (Note: Galarian Mr. Mime (introduced in Pokémon Sword and Shield) are capable of evolving into Mr. Rime.)	Despite its name, there are female Mr. Mime. Its a skilled mime that loves to pantomime. It can create barriers by vibrating the air with its fingertips. If it is interrupted or its audience is unimpressed, it will slap them with its broad hands. It has an Ice/Psychic-type Galarian form.
Scyther Sutoraiku (ストライク) (0123)	Bug / Flying	—N/a	Scizor (#0212); Kleavor (#0900)	IGN and GamesRadar have praised Scyther's "cool" design. With its ninja-like movements, Scyther can create afterimages of itself. It can slice thick logs with a single stroke. On rare occasions, it flies with its wings. It is proud of its speed. While young, they live together deep in the mountains, training themselves in fighting with their scythes and moving at high speeds.
Jynx Rūjura (ルージュラ) (0124)	Ice / Psychic	Smoochum (#0238)	data-sort-value="" style="background: var(--background-color-interactive, #ececec); color: var(--color-base, inherit); vertical-align: middle; text-align: center; " class="table-na" | —N/a	Jynx has spawned controversy due to aspects of its design being similar to blackface, leading Game Freak to change the color of its skin from black to purple. When Pokémon Yellow was rereleased on the Nintendo 3DS Virtual Console, the in-game sprite of Jynx was edited to reflect this change. Jynx's appearance is a purple humanoid with blond hair and a dress. It can put opponents to sleep by kissing them. Jynx can communicate with what appears to be a human-like language, though it has yet to be deciphered, so they usually opt to communicate with dance-like movement instead.
Electabuzz Erebū (エレブー) (0125)	Electric	Elekid (#0239)	Electivire (#0466)	Groups of Electabuzz gather near power plants or places likely to be struck by thunder to feast on electricity. For this reason, they are often placed in houses as lightning rods. Power plants employ the use of Ground-type Pokémon to prevent Electabuzz from eating their energy and causing blackouts, though they are usually the fault of the companies running them. In the dark, it glows a whitish-blue color.
Magmar Būbā (ブーバー) (0126)	Fire	Magby (#0240)	Magmortar (#0467)	While Magmar was voted the eighth best fire-type Pokémon by the Official Nintendo Magazine readers, GamesRadar had criticized its design multiple times, noting that its forehead resembles a butt. Magmar are found in and around active volcanoes. Its body temperature is 2,200 °F. It dislikes cold places, so it blows flames to make the environment suitable for itself. Its appearance is often obscured by the flames that cover it. It can heal and rest itself by dipping its body into lava. In battle, Magmar blows out flames from all over its body to intimidate its opponent. When it breathes, its temperature rises, and when it sneezes, flames shoot out. Magmar dispatches its prey with fire, but may accidentally burn said prey to a charred crisp.
Pinsir Kairosu (カイロス) (0127)	Bug	—N/a	Mega Evolution	It was originally supposed to have an evolution called "Plux" in generation II. Some speculated that this unused design was reworked into Heracross. Pinsir can use its pincers to crush, toss, bludgeon, or tear anything up to twice its size. Captured prey is kept in place by the piercing thorns and sheer strength of Pinsir's horns, and will not be released until they are torn in half. If it cannot be torn in half, it tosses it around. In addition to hunting prey, it also tends to enjoy tree sap. Pinsir live in temperate forests or jungles, and burrow their way underground or inside trees to avoid the cold. In Alola, it has a rivalry with Vikavolt, yet gets along with Heracross. In other regions, however, it competes with Heracross for food. Pinsir are known to judge each other based on their pincers, which also determine its popularity with the opposite gender based on how thick it looks. It gained a Mega Evolution in generation VI.
Tauros Kentarosu (ケンタロス) (0128)	Normal	No evolution		When attacking, it violently charges while whipping itself with its three tails. Like Rhyhorn, it will not stop running until it hits something. Although powerful, it can only charge in a straight line. They fight each other by locking horns to prove their strength, and the leader prides itself with its battle-scarred horns. If there are no opponents, it will charge into thick trees, knocking them down. Historically, people have ridden Tauros for ages, a practice said to have started in Alola. Tauros in Alola actually have a calm side, most likely due to the climate. Tauros in Galar, however, are more volatile and will not let people ride them. It has three Paldean forms.
Magikarp Koikingu (コイキング) (0129)	Water	—N/a	Gyarados (#0130)	Magikarp is mostly useless in the games, until it evolves into Gyarados. Magikarp is based on the common carp. At level 15, Magikarp learns Tackle. Until then, it only knows Splash and cannot be taught any other moves. In the distant past, it was somewhat stronger than the descendants that exist today. Despite its weakness, it is actually a hardy and fertile Pokémon that can survive in any body of water. Its swimming muscles are weak, so it gets easily washed away by currents, so places where water pools like seas, lakes, rivers, and shallow puddles will have many Magikarp stuck in them. It may jump on rare occasions, but never more than seven feet, making it easy for predators like Pidgeotto to catch it mid-jump. In rare occasions, a Magikarp living for many years can leap up a mountain.
Gyarados Gyaradosu (ギャラドス) (0130)	Water / Flying	Magikarp (#0129)	Mega Evolution	When Magikarp evolves into Gyarados, its brain cells undergo a structural transformation, said to be the cause of its violent nature. Throughout history, it would appear and burn down cities, villages, and towns in rampages lasting around a month. There are some regions where it is called "the deity of destruction". Despite its Flying type, Gyarados cannot actually fly. It gained a Mega Evolution in generation VI.
Lapras Rapurasu (ラプラス) (0131)	Water / Ice	—N/a	Gigantamax	Lapras have gentle hearts. Poachers drove Lapras to the point of near-extinction, though recent protection regulations have instead made it an overabundant species. It loves transporting people on its back, and can actually understand human speech thanks to its high intelligence. Lapras will sing with other Lapras as a form of communication, or by itself when happy. Lapras is based on the Loch Ness Monster and the plesiosaur, and in early versions of Red and Blue was named "Ness". It gained a Gigantamax form in generation VIII. Japan's Miyagi Prefecture have utilized Lapras' image to encourage tourism as the prefecture's "official Pokémon". Lapras has been well received by critics, and has appeared on several lists of the best Pokémon of all time.
Ditto Metamon (メタモン) (0132)	Normal	No evolution		Appearing as an amorphous blob, Ditto is capable of transforming into an exact copy of anything it sees by altering its genetic code. However, this transformation is often imperfect. The specific imperfections vary from Ditto to Ditto. It does not get along with others of the same species, as they will both fruitlessly try to transform into each other. Ditto rose in popularity with Gold and Silver, where it was able to "breed" with any other Pokémon that is able to breed, becoming vital for the franchise's competitive scene. It cannot breed with itself, though. Due to its similarities to Mew, a longtime rumor arose that it was a failed clone. However, this fan theory has been denied by Game Freak.
Eevee Ībui (イーブイ) (0133)	Normal	—N/a	Multiple (Note: Eevee is capable of evolving into Vaporeon (#0134), Jolteon (#0135), Flareon (#0136), Espeon (#0196), Umbreon (#0197), Leafeon (#0470), Glaceon (#0471) or Sylveon (#0700).); Gigantamax	Eevee is often considered among the "cutest" Pokémon in the franchise. Due to this, Eevee is featured on various Pokémon-related merchandise. It is the mascot of Pokémon: Let's Go, Eevee! Eevee has exclusive evolution styles, where each evolution requires special requirements to occur, resulting in 8 different Pokémon. Eevee and its evolutions are sometimes referred to as "Eeveelutions". Eevee is mostly found in highly populated areas like cities and towns. Its unstable genes allow it to adapt to most habitats, and even to its trainer, to the point of eventually adopting a face similar to theirs. In generation VIII, it gained a Gigantamax form.
Vaporeon Shawāzu (シャワーズ) (0134)	Water	Eevee (#0133)	—N/a	Its genes and DNA are nearly identical to water, so it can melt away into it to hide from foes or prey. If its fins begin to mutate, it means rain is coming in a couple of hours. It has the ability to freely control water. It evolves from Eevee using a Water Stone. Vaporeon has been used as the ambassador for Water Day in Japan. In 2025, a CRISPR gene editing paper published by the University of Leicester stated that editing the genome of foxes could create creatures very similar to Vaporeon. A popular internet copypasta, stating that Vaporeon was the most "sexually compatible with humans" out of all Pokémon species, became a meme among the Pokémon community. Originally posted on 4chan in 2018, its spread was attributed to its sudden, overly detailed, unprompted nature. Memes and fan art relating to the joke became prevalent within the community following its original posting.
Jolteon Sandāsu (サンダース) (0135)	Electric	Eevee (#0133)	—N/a	It accumulates negative ions in the air to dish out 10,000 volt discharges. It is a moody Pokémon, easily becoming sad or angry, and its spiky fur can be launched to pierce enemies when it bristles. Jolteon's cells emit a low amount of electricity, which is amplified by its needle-like fur. If its hair stands on end, it is about to discharge. The crackling sound of electricity can be heard when it exhales.
Flareon Būsutā (ブースター) (0136)	Fire	Eevee (#0133)	—N/a	It stores fire over 1,650 °F inside its flame sac, then releases it at over 3,000 °F. Its fur is used to air out its body so it doesn't overheat. An omnivore, it roasts berries and prey before eating them. In 2014, during the Twitch Plays Pokemon experiment, an Eevee was the source of much debate due to the players wanting to evolve it into a Vaporeon or a Jolteon, but they accidentally used a Fire Stone to evolve it into a Flareon. This incident led to the Flareon being named to the "False Prophet" by the Twitch community.
Porygon Porigon (ポリゴン) (0137)	Normal	—N/a	Porygon2 (#0233)	Porygon has become notorious for being featured in an episode of the anime that caused widespread epileptic seizures in Japanese viewers. Created in 1995, it is made entirely of programming code. It can enter cyberspace at will. People theorized it could go into outer space, though no Porygon has managed to achieve this so far. It has no heartbeat and does not need to eat, though it can eat if food is given. Because of this, people are eager to test it in any environment. Porygon is copy-protected so it cannot be duplicated. It was made with the best technology of 1995, so it has become outdated compared to Pokémon like Genesect and Type: Null. It is still useful in cyberspace, as it goes around making sure no suspicious data exists.
Omanyte Omunaito (オムナイト) (0138)	Rock / Water	—N/a	Omastar (#0139)	Omanyte is an ancient Pokémon that has been regenerated from Helix Fossils by people using modern science. If attacked by an enemy, it withdraws to its hard shell. It can use air stored inside its shell to rise or fall in water. Omanyte lived in ancient seas. Archeops and Carracosta have been known to prey on it.. The fossils Omanyte have been resurrected from are excavated from areas that were once large oceans. Because some Omanyte manage to escape after being restored or are released into the wild by people, it is gradually becoming an invasive species.
Omastar Omusutā (オムスター) (0139)	Rock / Water	Omanyte (#0138)	—N/a	Omastar is commonly referred to as "Lord Helix" within the community, as a reference to Twitch Plays Pokémon, where the Pokémon was seen as a good-luck charm. Omastar uses its tentacles to capture its prey. It is believed that it went extinct because its shell grew too large and heavy, causing its movements to become too slow and clumsy. Once wrapped around its prey, it never lets go as it attacks by tearing into it with the sharp beaks that ring its mouth.
Kabuto Kabuto (カブト) (0140)	Rock / Water	—N/a	Kabutops (#0141)	Kabuto is an ancient Pokémon that has been regenerated from a Dome Fossil. However, in extremely rare cases, living examples have been discovered, being identical to their 300 million year-old counterparts. It is said to have inhabited ancient beaches. It protects itself using its hard shell and glowing red eyes.
Kabutops Kabutopusu (カブトプス) (0141)	Rock / Water	Kabuto (#0140)	—N/a	Kabutops were aggressive prehistoric Pokémon that inhabited warm seas. They swam underwater to hunt for prey in ancient times. It was apparently in the process of evolving from being a water-dweller to living on land, as evident from the beginnings of change in its gills and legs. The exact cause of its extincion is unknown. It swims at speeds of roughly 29 knots, closing in on prey and tearing at its foes with sickle-like forelegs, and drains the foe's body fluids entirely. The discarded body parts become food for other Pokémon. In the water, it tucks in its limbs to become more compact, then it wiggles its shell to swim faster.
Aerodactyl Putera (プテラ) (0142)	Rock / Flying	—N/a	Mega Evolution	A vicious prehistoric Pokémon, it goes for its opponents' throats with its serrated, saw-like fangs that shred the skin of even Steel-type Pokémon. It went extinct, but it was resurrected by taking its DNA from an Old Amber. It flies by spreading its wings and gliding though the skies, to the point of being referred to as their king. A widely accepted theory is that it went extinct due to a meteor impact. Despite its strength in the air, it is weak and slow on the ground. Even modern technology is still unable to make a truly perfect specimen. It is based on pterodactyls and dragons or wyverns. It gained a Mega Evolution in generation VI.
Snorlax Kabigon (カビゴン) (0143)	Normal	Munchlax (#0446)	Gigantamax	It is carefree about everything, and it will allow children to play on its vast belly while it sleeps all day. After eating around 900 pounds of food, it goes to sleep for a while. It is a large, obese Pokémon with a bluish-green body and a white circle-shaped belly, white feet and face. It is said to be able to eat nearly anything with little to no side-effects, such as thorny plants or Muk's poison. Snorlax is commonly used as a roadblock within the games. It gained a Gigantamax form in generation VIII.
Articuno Furīzā (フリーザー) (0144)	Ice / Flying	No evolution		It is part of the Legendary Bird Trio. The naming conventions for this trio are based on their type – Arctic, Zap and Molt – along with 1, 2, 3 in Spanish – uno, dos, tres respectively. It is said to appear to doomed people who are lost in icy mountains and guide them out. The flapping of Articuno's wings can chill the air around it and cause blizzards. A Psychic/Flying-type legendary Pokémon is similar to Articuno and shares its name, to the point of being referred to as its Galarian Form, though it is actually an unrelated Pokémon.
Zapdos Sandā (サンダー) (0145)	Electric / Flying	No evolution		It is part of the Legendary Bird Trio. Its design is inspired by the Indigenous North American myth of the thunderbird. It is said to cause and appear from dark and gray clouds in the sky while shedding lightning from its wings. It has the power to control electricity, and is said to gain power from thunder storms. It is said that when it rubs its feathers together, lightning will fall immediately after, and there are tales of Zapdos resting in pitch black thunderclouds. As with Articuno, a similar Fighting/Flying-type Pokémon is referred to as its Galarian form.
Moltres Faiyā (ファイヤー) (0146)	Fire / Flying	No evolution		It is part of the Legendary Bird Trio. Its design is inspired by the firebird of Slavic folklore. It can make the sky turn red as it flaps its fiery wings. It is said to bring spring early when it arrives to cold lands. If Moltres is injured, it is said to dip itself in magma to burn and heal itself. There are stories that tell of its fire-cloaked wings lighting up paths for those lost traveling in the mountains. A Dark/Flying-type Pokémon is referred to as its Galarian form, though as with the rest of the trio, the Pokémon are not actually related by blood.
Dratini Miniryū (ミニリュウ) (0147)	Dragon	—N/a	Dragonair (#0148)	A Dratini continually molts and sloughs off its old skin almost daily. It does so because the life energy within its body steadily builds to reach uncontrollable levels. This allows Dratini to grow longer and longer, even reaching 6 feet in length. In some regions, boots made from the tanned cast-off skin of Dratini are a luxury item. The small lump on a Dratini's forehead is actually an underdeveloped horn. After a 10-hour struggle, a fisherman was finally able to pull one up and confirm its existence. Though still weak, it dwells near bodies of rapidly flowing water, such as the plunge pools of waterfalls to protect it while it repeatedly sheds its skin. It eats whatever food sinks down, and lives a quiet and happy life.
Dragonair Hakuryū (ハクリュー) (0148)	Dragon	Dratini (#0147)	Dragonite (#0149)	Dragonair can grow the wings on its head to fly, but can also fly without them. It stores an enormous amount of energy inside its body, and can alter weather conditions in its vicinity by discharging energy from the crystals on its body. The lakes where Dragonair live are filled with offerings from people and are respected by farmers. Some say that seeing a Dragonair flying around at the start of the year is a sign that one will be healthy all year long.
Dragonite Kairyū (カイリュー) (0149)	Dragon / Flying	Dragonair (#0148)	Mega Evolution	Capable of circling the globe in just sixteen hours and with the intelligence of a human, tales of this kindhearted Pokémon leading lost and foundering ships to the safety of land are commonplace. It is said that somewhere in the ocean lies an island where Dragonite gather. Its build lets it freely fly over raging seas without trouble to rescue drowning people. Observing this, a ship's captain dubbed it "the sea incarnate", and figureheads that resemble Dragonite now decorate the bows of many ships.
Mewtwo Myūtsū (ミュウツー) (0150)	Psychic	—N/a	Two Mega Evolutions	It is a playable character in Super Smash Bros. Melee, Super Smash Bros. for Nintendo 3DS / Wii U and Super Smash Bros. Ultimate. Mewtwo originated from the DNA of Mew, mutated by Dr. Fuji in a lab after years of gene splicing. Even though it has powerful psychic abilities, scientists failed to give it a compassionate heart, and it turned vicious as a result. It rests to conserve energy, so that it can unleash its full power in battle. In generation VI, it gained two Mega Evolutions; one adapted for physical attacks, and one adapted for special attacks.
Mew Myū (ミュウ) (0151)	Psychic	No evolution		This mythical Pokémon is so rare, only a few experts worldwide have found it, though a growing number of people have reportedly seen it recently. It apparently originates from South America. It is said that it appears only to those who have a true heart and a strong passion to see it. Its DNA is said to contain the genetic code of every Pokémon and every move. Because of this, many scientists believe that it is the ancestor of all Pokémon. Its fine, small, and delicate hairs can be viewed with a microscope. It is capable of turning invisible at will so that people are unaware of its presence. It is considered one of the original progenitor Pokémon, as all Pokémon are said to have descended from Mew.
MissingNo. Ketsuban (けつばん) (000 (Note: MissingNo. is programmed with the Kanto Pokédex number "000", however it does not exist in the National Pokédex.))	Normal / Bird (Note: "Bird" was a scrapped type for generations I and II; however, code for it remains in the games. MissingNo. is a Bird-type in Red, Blue, and Green versions, however, it is replaced by a randomly generated glitch type in Yellow.)	No evolution		An error handler whose name stands for "Missing Number", it was created to handle attempts at accessing data for nonexistent Pokémon within the game, appearing instead. However, due to a bug, it was available for players to encounter in certain circumstances. This particular glitch has been regarded as one of the most popular in video game history.
