= Flygon =

Pokémon species

- Pokémon character
- Flygon artwork by Ken Sugimori
- First appearance: Pokémon Ruby and Sapphire (2002)
- Designed by: Ken Sugimori (finalized)

In-universe information
- Species: Pokémon
- Type: Ground and Dragon

Flygon (/ˈflaɪɡɑːn/; Japanese: フライゴン) is a Pokémon species in Nintendo and Game Freak's Pokémon media franchise. It is the evolved form of Vibrava, which evolves from Trapinch. First introduced in the video games Pokémon Ruby and Sapphire, it has since appeared in multiple games including Pokémon Go and the Pokémon Trading Card Game, as well as various merchandise. While Trapinch is a pure Ground type, Vibrava and Flygon are Ground and Dragon type. This type combination was unique to them until Gible, Gabite, and Garchomp were introduced in Pokémon Diamond and Pearl.

Flygon has been positively received for its design since inception, though many found its stats underwhelming. It was also popular with multiple actors in the series, including Nanase Nishino and Mahiro Takasugi. It was originally going to receive a Mega Evolution, but was scrapped due to artist's block, which has also led to criticism.

== Concept and creation ==
Flygon is a species of fictional creatures called Pokémon created for the Pokémon media franchise. Developed by Game Freak and published by Nintendo, the Japanese franchise began in 1996 with the video games Pokémon Red and Green for the Game Boy, which were later released in North America as Pokémon Red and Blue in 1998. In these games and their sequels, the player assumes the role of a Trainer whose goal is to capture and use the creatures' special abilities to engage in combat with other Pokémon. Some Pokémon can transform into stronger species through a process called evolution via various means, such as exposure to specific items. Each Pokémon has one or two elemental types, which define its advantages and disadvantages when battling other Pokémon. A major goal in each game is to complete the Pokédex, a comprehensive Pokémon encyclopedia, by capturing, evolving, and trading with other Trainers to obtain individuals from all Pokémon species.

Flygon was introduced in the 2002 sequels Pokémon Ruby and Sapphire. When designing the games, Game Freak initially wanted to not include any of the Pokémon from the previous games, with lead artist Ken Sugimori using this as an opportunity to push the concept of what a Pokémon could look like. To this end, he wanted to try more "humanoid" designs and also emphasize "cooler" ones, due to feedback the team had received that Pokémon was seen as too "babyish". Additionally, while the previous Pokémon Gold and Silver species were bound to simplistic designs for the sake of the related anime and toy manufacturing, Sugimori stated in an interview he said "screw it" and focused on more complex and fleshed out designs with these games. As the art team developed the Pokémon species, Sugimori would finalize their work and draw the promotional art, altering details as he felt necessary.

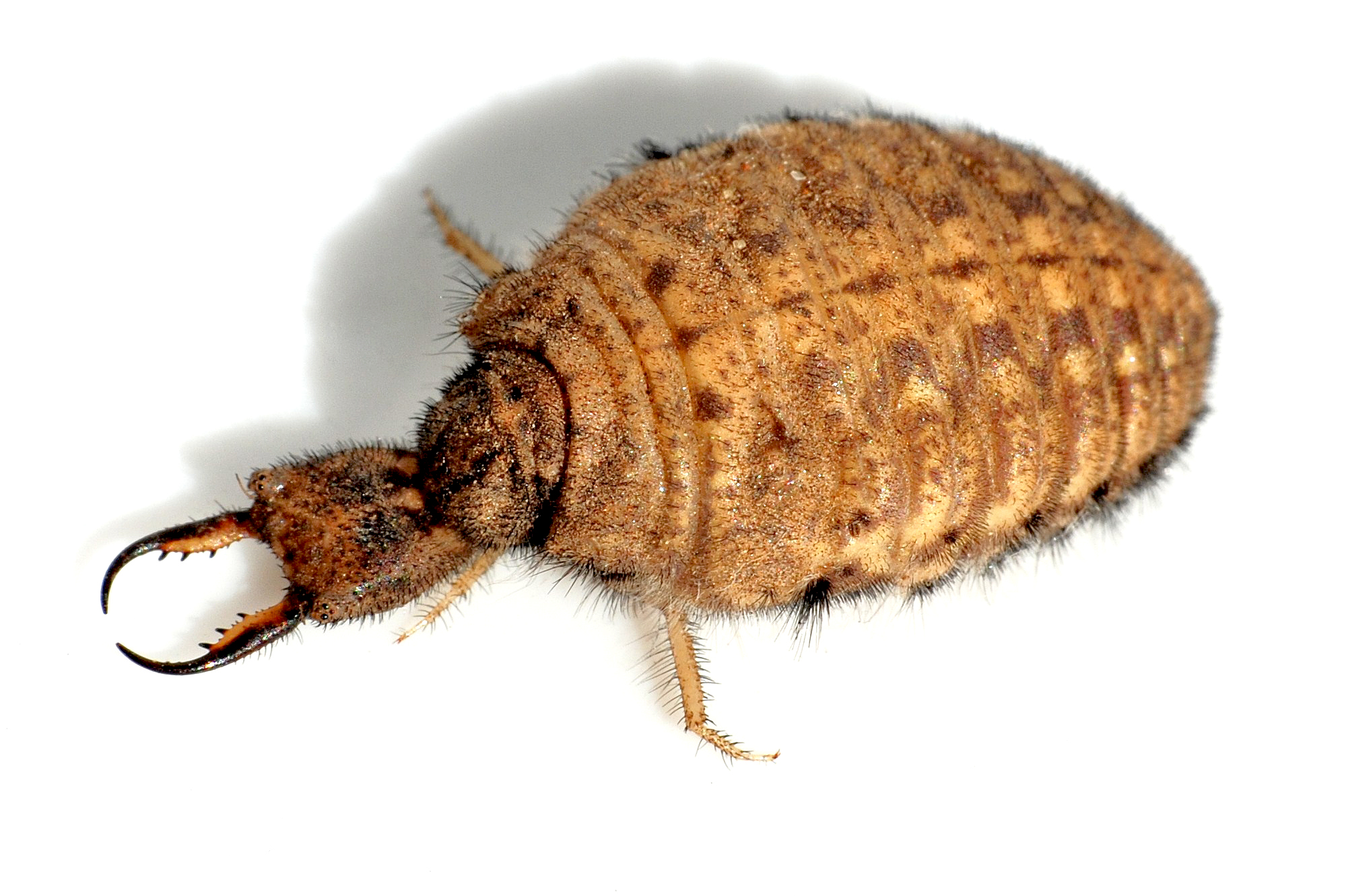
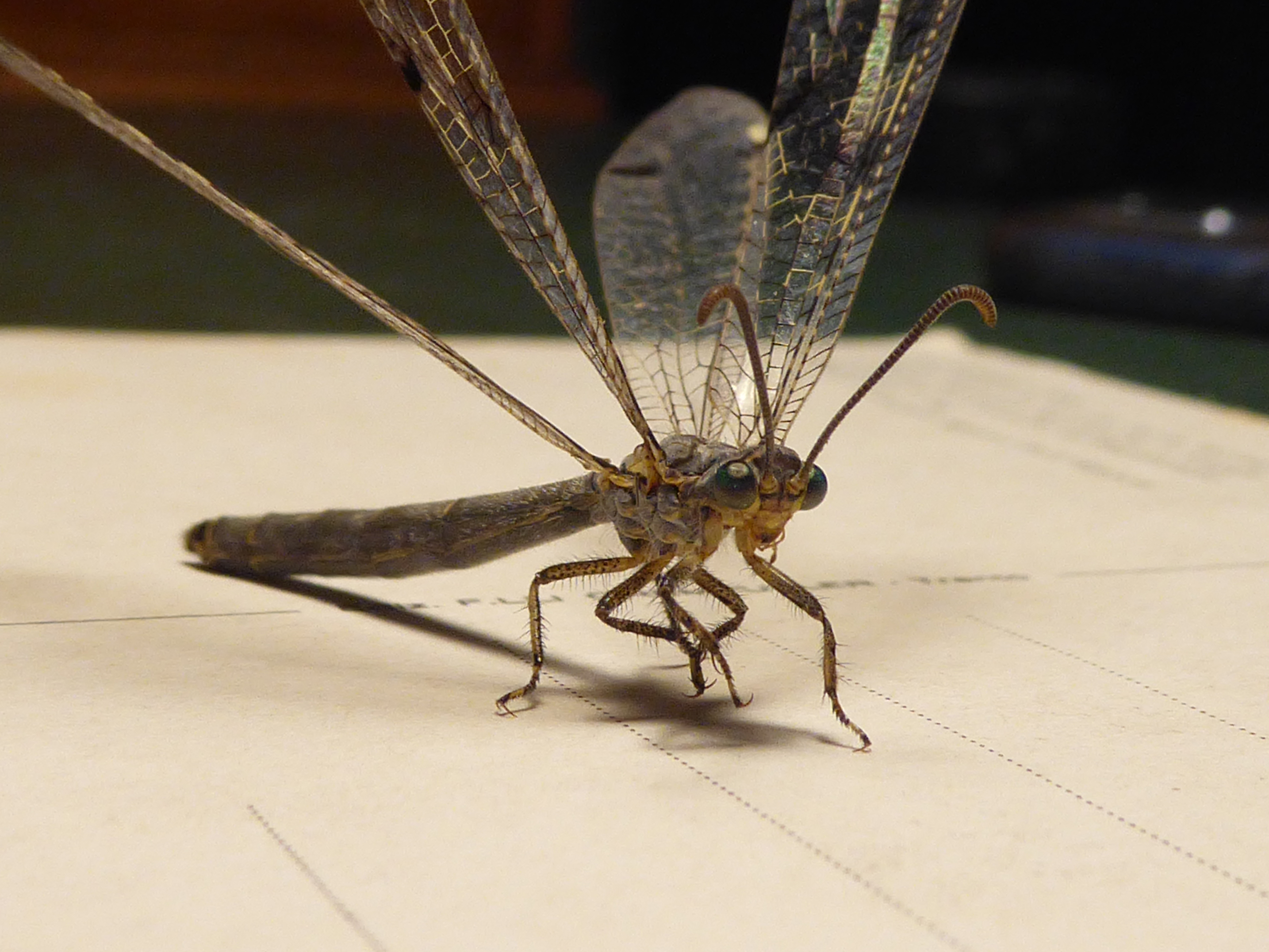
The Flygon evolutionary line is based on the lifecycle of antlions; Trapinch is based on antlion larvae whilst Flygon is based on adult antlions.

Starting as a Trapinch, an orange, insectoid Pokémon that builds nests in the desert by digging into the sand to wait for prey to get caught. Trapinch is based on larval antlions. Trapinch eventually becomes Vibrava, a dragonfly-like Pokémon with underdeveloped wings that can create ultrasonic waves to knock out prey. It is based on an adult antlion. Flygon is an insectoid dragon, having a red-and-green body with one pair of wings. When it flaps these wings, it creates a "singing" sound that attracts prey. It is based on a winged adult antlion. Entomologist Rebecca N. Kittel classified it in the order Coleoptera, family Lucanidae. Zoologists André W. Prado and Thiago F. A. Almeida applied real-world taxonomy to Flygon, stating that it belongs to the subphylum Hexapoda, class Insecta, and order Neuroptera. Flygon has gone by multiple nicknames, including "The Elemental Spirit of the Desert" and "The Desert Spirit" due to its sandstorms it uses to hide.

In an interview with Sugimori over the games Pokémon Omega Ruby and Alpha Sapphire, he stated that, ever since the games Pokémon X and Y, they had considered giving Flygon a Mega Evolution, a type of super-powered form that changes a Pokémon's form and power. It ultimately did not receive one due to them struggling to conceive an idea for how it would look.

== Appearances ==
Flygon debuts in Pokémon Ruby and Sapphire, obtained by evolving it from Vibrava. It appears in the remakes Pokémon Omega Ruby and Alpha Sapphire as part of the team of a new character called Aarune, who is an expert on Secret Bases, a mechanic in the games and remakes. Designer Ken Sugimori explained that this was due to wanting to give Aarune a Pokémon that could use both the moves Fly and Secret Power, which he believed were good for finding Secret Bases. Sugimori chose Flygon due to it being the only Pokémon from the third generation that fulfilled these criteria. It has gone on to appear in most mainline Pokémon games at launch, until being absent from Pokémon Scarlet and Violet until the release of its downloadable content, The Indigo Disk. It also appears in Pokémon Go, as well as the Pokémon Trading Card Game. Flygon appears as a partner with the Dragon-type trainer Raihan in the mobile game Pokémon Masters EX. It was added to the mobile game Pokémon Sleep in November 2023. It appears in 2026 game Pokopia, where the player can meet it in the Sparkling Skylands using a habitat of pink grass.

Raihan's Flygon appears in the seventh episode of the anime series, Pokémon: Twilight Wings. Flygon has received multiple pieces of merchandise, including stuffed toys, figurines, and apparel. It was featured in a collaboration between Pokémon and the virtual idol Hatsune Miku, who has a design based around the Ground type.

== Reception ==
Flygon has been generally well received, described as a fan favorite by multiple critics. An official popularity poll resulted in Flygon being voted the 10th most popular Pokémon species. IGN writer Lucas M. Thomas believed that Flygon was one of the most unexpected evolutions in Ruby and Sapphire, discussing how Trapinch was more like a "Bug-type ant creature than anything else". He believed that players were happy with the evolution due to how powerful it was in combat. Pocket Tactics writer Connor Christie believed that it was among the most overlooked third-generation Pokémon species, as well as Dragon-type Pokémon. He believed that, while it was inferior to fellow Ruby and Sapphire Pokémon Salamence, the unique type combination it had helped make it useful in battle. Nanase Nishino, an actress in A Pocketful of Adventures, answered that her favorite Pokémon was Flygon, stating that she enjoys cool-looking Dragon-type Pokémon, believing Flygon to be especially cool. She stated that fantasized about Flygon existing in real life. She added that she enjoyed drawing Pokémon, and that Flygon was the Pokémon she drew the most. Another actor, Mahiro Takasugi, also considered Flygon his favorite Pokémon, stating that he fell in love at first sight and always put it on his team when possible. Dot Esports writer Yash Nair stated that, while it was not a particularly powerful Pokémon, it was memorable both for its design and how memorable it was to obtain the Dragon-type Flygon by evolving it from the Ground-type Trapinch.

Inside Games writer Sawasdee Otsuka remarked how strange it was that Flygon was featured in the team of Bug-type trainer Aaron in Brilliant Diamond and Shining Pearl, believing that it was featured due to its ability to learn Bug-type moves, including "Bug Buzz", which no other Dragon besides Vibrava can learn. ITMedia writer Yamaguchi Quest encouraged players to use it on their teams, in part due to its effectiveness against the Pokémon Dracozolt, which had proven popular in competitive battles. In particular, he wanted it to see use before the Pokémon Garchomp is added to the game, stating that it was not only also Ground and Dragon, but better than Flygon in every statistic.

The lack of a Mega Evolution for Flygon has been a point of contention for players and multiple critics. Upon the reveal that Pokémon Legends: Z-A would add new Mega Evolutions, GamesRadar+ writer Catherine Lewis expressed hope that Flygon would get one, expressing how confusing it was to her that Omega Ruby and Alpha Sapphire did not add it. The Escapist writer Lowell Bell believed that it was likely it would get a Mega Evolution in Legends: Z-A, expressing how shocked he was by how little Flygon had gotten since its debut, Mega Evolution or otherwise. Fellow The Escapist writers Jack Bye and Sam Smith believed that Mega Flygon was a concept that people universally supported in the Pokémon fan base, stating that Flygon is so well-loved due to a "standout" design and combat potential that a Mega Evolution would further enhance. They also argued that Flygon was a Pokémon defined by change, citing a "massive shift" from Trapinch to Flygon, and that Mega Flygon would have the freedom to be inventive without ruining its appeal. Kotaku writer Kenneth Shepard stated that the confirmation that Flygon would not receive a Mega Evolution in the Legends: Z-A downloadable content Mega Dimension caused Flygon fans to become upset, made worse by a trailer showing a "Mega Stone" that resembled Flygon.
