= Good as Gold =

Good as Gold may refer to:

- Good as Gold (novel), a 1979 novel by Joseph Heller
- Good as Gold (Red Rockers album), 1983
- Good as Gold (Eddie Money album), 1996
- "Good as Gold (Stupid as Mud)", a 1994 song by The Beautiful South
- Good as Gold (Doctor Who), a 2012 Doctor Who Script to Screen Blue Peter special episode
- Good as Gold (film), a 1927 American Western film
- “Good as Gold” (song), 2020 song by Ai
- "Good as Gold", a song by Dala from Best Day, 2012
- Good as Gold, the signature ability of the Pokémon species Gholdengo

== See also ==
- Good as Gold!, a 1983 album by Country Gentlemen, released in 1983
