= Kleavor =

Pokémon species

- Pokémon character
- Kleavor artwork by Ken Sugimori
- First game: Pokémon Legends: Arceus (2022)

In-universe information
- Species: Pokémon
- Type: Bug and Rock

Kleavor (/ˈkliːvɔːr/), known in Japan as Basagiri (Japanese: バサギリ), is a Pokémon species in Nintendo and Game Freak's Pokémon franchise. Introduced in Pokémon Legends: Arceus, a game set in the franchise's distant past, it has since appeared in multiple games including Pokémon Go and the Pokémon Trading Card Game, as well as media related to the franchise.

Classified as a Bug- and Rock-type Pokémon, it is an evolution of the Pokémon Scyther, who first appeared in the games Pokémon Red and Blue, if Scyther is given a Black Augurite item. In Arceus, Kleavor is regarded as a "Noble Pokémon" and players first encounter it as a boss due to it being driven into a sudden frenzy.

Kleavor has received a primarily positive reception debut. It has been significantly analyzed for various elements of its design, such as in regard to its references to real-world insects and Japanese culture. Its design has also received both praise and criticism compared to Scyther and its other evolution, Scizor, considering it either a suitable counterpart alongside the other two, or denouncing it as a sign of declining creativity in the Pokémon franchise over the years.

== Conception and design ==
From left to right: Scyther and its evolutions Scizor and Kleavor as they appear in the games Pokémon Scarlet and Violet.

Kleavor is a species of fictional creatures called Pokémon created for the Pokémon media franchise. Developed by Game Freak and published by Nintendo, the Japanese franchise began in 1996 with the video games Pokémon Red and Green for the Game Boy, which were later released in North America as Pokémon Red and Blue in 1998. In these games and their sequels, the player assumes the role of a Trainer whose goal is to capture and use the creatures' special abilities to combat other Pokémon. Some Pokémon can transform into stronger species through a process called evolution via various means, such as exposure to specific items. Each Pokémon has one or two elemental types, which define its advantages and disadvantages when battling other Pokémon. A major goal in each game is to complete the Pokédex, a comprehensive Pokémon encyclopedia, by capturing, evolving, and trading with other Trainers to obtain individuals from all Pokémon species.

Called Basagiri in Japan, Kleavor was introduced in Pokémon Legends: Arceus, a game set in the franchise's Hisui region and featuring Pokémon designs as they would have appeared over a hundred years prior to the events of Pokémon Diamond and Pearl. Classified as a Bug- and Rock-type Pokémon, Kleavor stands 5 feet 11 inches (180 cm) tall, and resembles an anthropomorphic bipedal yellow and white praying mantis with two legs that end in dual-clawed feet with raised heels, and two arms that have brown large axe-like protrusions at the end. Its shoulders are encircled with rock-like brown protrusions, and similar protrusions cover its brow and lower jack, while a singular spit juts from the top of its otherwise bald head. On its back, it has a pair of small white wings jutting from each shoulder. Kleavor evolves from Scyther, a Pokémon that first appeared in Pokémon Red and Blue, through the use of the game's "Black Augurite" item. Prior to Arceus, Scyther's only evolution option was Scizor, a Pokémon introduced in Pokémon Gold and Silver.

== Appearances ==
Kleavor first appears in Pokémon Legends: Arceus, a game set in the Hisui region, a distant past version of Pokémon Diamond and Pearl's Sinnoh region. Players first encounter it as a "Noble Pokémon", a special Pokémon worshipped by the locals. Driven into a frenzy by a space-time distortion in the skies of Hisui, the player is required to battle it in a boss battle, after which it is restored to normal. Kleavor later reappears in the games Pokémon Scarlet and Violet via the Indigo Disk downloadable content. Though the Black Augurite item is not obtainable in these games, Kleavor can be encountered and caught in the wild. Meanwhile, the Mega Dimensions downloadable content for Pokémon Legends: Z-A adds Kleavor to wild encounters in the game, and allows the player to obtain Black Augurite.

Kleavor also appears in spin-off games and media for the series, such as in Pokémon Go where instead of evolving it from Scyther the player can obtain it by defeating it in special raid battles. Kleavor also appears in the Pokémon Horizons: The Series, where a stronger version of the species is owned by a Pokémon trainer named Lucius who hails from the ancient past. Meanwhile, several cards for it appear in the Pokémon Trading Card Game.

== Critical reception ==
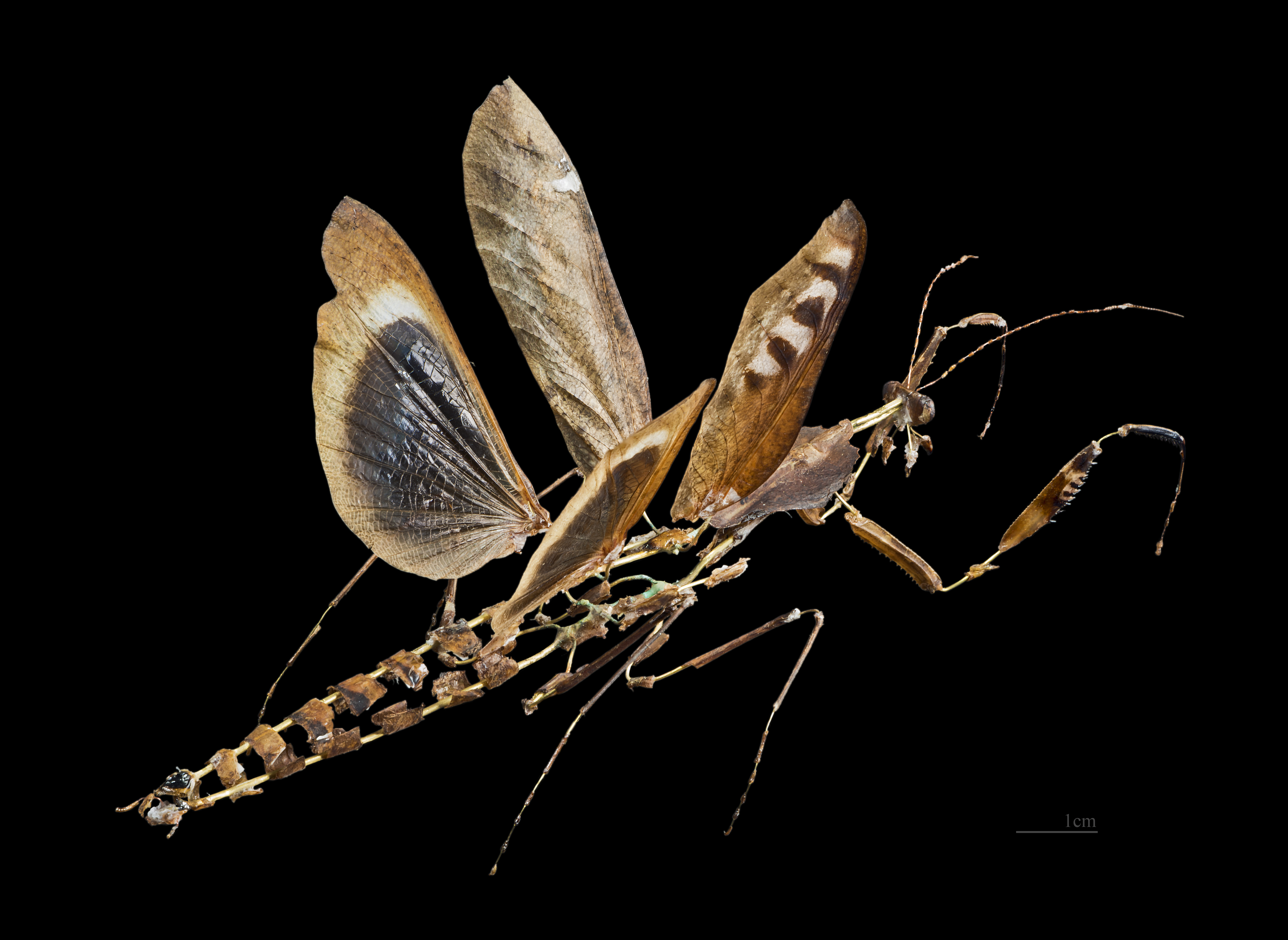
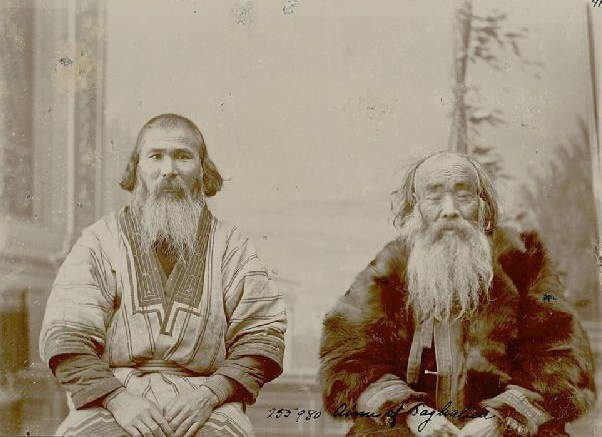
Kleavor's design has been compared to the giant dead leaf mantis (left), a praying mantis species known for utilizing camouflage. Meanwhile, other aspects have been compared to the Ainu people (right), an indigenous people native to the area of Japan the Hisui region takes inspiration from.

Kleavor was mostly well received since its debut. Ryan Woodrow in an article for Sports Illustrated praised its design, stating it continued a trend of each part of Scyther's evolution line being unique: "Scyther has speed and bug-based appeal, Scizor is sturdy and strong, and Kleavor looks like an absolute monster." He additionally liked how its double axe design made it look "vicious", and how well Arceus showcased the species. In another article for USA Today, he further called it a great "alternative take on Scyther's evolution", and wanted to see concepts like it explored in future installments. Hana Kim of Paste meanwhile argued that while Scizor "refined and smoothed out" Scyther's design, Kleavor represented a roughening up of it due to its exaggerated axes and "rocky, craggy protrusions", making it feel closer to Scyther's appearance than Scizor. Abdur Rozaq Aji Samudra and Muh Ariffudin Islam, writing for the Indonesian visual communication design journal Jurnal Barik, praised how it referenced the giant dead leaf mantis, a real-world species of praying mantis known for using camouflage, with Kleavor's rock-like aspects helping it do similar with the terrain found in Arceus.

Yash Nair of Dot eSports considered Kleavor to be one of the best Rock-type Pokémon in the franchise, stating that Scyther's evolutionary line "never disappoints", and that "once again, Game Freak hit a home run" with its debut. He opined that to him Kleavor was an even better design than Scizor, and represented the idea of a Noble Pokémon well. However, TheGamer's Editor in Chief Stacey Henley was more critical, stating that it only served to add another "gimmick" to the franchise, something she felt had worn thin. She described Scyther's other evolution Scizor as "one of the best looking and most popular Pokémon of its type" and questioned why an alternative evolution line was necessary, feeling it continued a trend of questionable choices regarding Pokémon species redesigns. Going further she stated that she would have preferred an additional evolution in Scyther's line instead of an alternative, as "splitting Scyther's evolutionary path doesn't seem like a worthwhile endeavour - especially when that endeavour leads to Kleavor." Henley elaborated that Kleavor was "bumpy and obnoxiously overdesigned where Scyther is sleek and simple". She felt that it looked more akin to a Digimon, characters from a rival brand of the Pokémon franchise. Coupled with questioning the necessity of the Noble Pokémon concept, she felt that for a franchise known for its great character design it seemed unable to "put its best foot forward".

=== References to Japanese culture ===
Samudra and Islam also examined Kleavor's design in the context of indigenous culture in Japan's history. They observed that its design such as its rock decorations and stone axes appeared to reference many aspects of the Ainu people, a tribe who inhabited the island of Hokkaido that faced discrimination and forced assimilation during Japan's Meiji Restoration era. They felt these references helped illustrate Kleavor as a remnant of a past "abandoned by Japanese society in modern times." Meanwhile, Edward G. McGowan and Lewis J. Alcott in the journal Geoscience Communication Discussions appreciated these tribal correlations. In particular, they compared Kleavor's reliance on Black Augurite to the tribe's reliance on obsidian to make primitive tools. They felt this correlation not only helped teach aspects of Hokkaido's geology, but also illustrated how games could be used to teach geology and geoscience.

The staff of Inside meanwhile pointed that its Japanese name seemed to be a reference to the phrase "Tourou no Ono", which meant when one "attacks recklessly without knowing oneself" and often represented characters that could be seen as either a hero or a fool. While in the game it was presented as a fierce opponent, the fact that Arceus was set in the past and Kleavor did not appear naturally in games set in the current timeline suggested to them that its reckless behavior may have led to its own extinction, something they felt gave Kleavor a tragic aspect.
