= Dragonite =

Pokémon species

- Pokémon character
- Dragonite artwork by Ken Sugimori
- First game: Pokémon Red and Blue (1996)
- Designed by: Shigeki Morimoto; Ken Sugimori (finalized)
- Voiced by: List: Katsuyuki Konishi; Kensuke Satō; Kenta Miyake; Kohsuke Tanabe

In-universe information
- Species: Pokémon
- Type: Dragon and Flying

Dragonite (/ˈdræɡənaɪt/), known as Kairyu (Japanese: カイリュー) in Japan, is a Pokémon species in Nintendo and Game Freak's Pokémon media franchise, and the evolved form of Dragonair, which evolves from Dratini. First introduced in the video games Pokémon Red and Blue, it was designed by Shigeki Morimoto, and, along with Dratini and Dragonair, was the only Dragon-type Pokémon until Pokémon Gold and Silver. It is a powerful Pokémon, with two being featured on the team of the Elite Four's leader, Lance. It has appeared in most mainline games since, as well as spin-offs, such as Pokémon Go. It also appears in other media, such multiple episodes of the Pokémon TV series and the Pokémon Trading Card Game. It is the focus of a short film titled Dragonite and the Postman.

In addition to being a Dragon-type Pokémon, it is also Flying type. It has light-orange skin and orange wings with teal membranes. It also has a striped belly, a tail, two antennae, and a horn. Unlike Dratini and Dragonair, which are both serpentine creatures, Dragonite grows arms and legs. Its colors also differ, with Dratini and Dragonair being blue.

Dragonite is a popular Pokémon from the first generation, regarded as one of the strongest from Red and Blue as well as one of the best Dragon-type Pokémon. The differences between Dragonair and Dragonite's designs also received commentary from critics, particularly criticisms that it was a downgrade or failed to justify the design change.

== Conception and development ==
Dragonite is a species of fictional creatures called Pokémon created for the Pokémon media franchise. Developed by Game Freak and published by Nintendo, the Japanese franchise began in 1996 with the video games Pokémon Red and Green for the Game Boy, which were later released in North America as Pokémon Red and Blue in 1998. In these games and their sequels, the player assumes the role of a Trainer whose goal is to capture and use the creatures' special abilities to combat other Pokémon. Some Pokémon can transform into stronger species through a process called evolution via various means, such as exposure to specific items. Each Pokémon has one or two elemental types, which define its advantages and disadvantages when battling other Pokémon. A major goal in each game is to complete the Pokédex, a comprehensive Pokémon encyclopedia, by capturing, evolving, and trading with other Trainers to obtain individuals from all Pokémon species.

Dragonite was designed by Shigeki Morimoto. Afterwards, the design was finalized by Ken Sugimori who, towards the end of development, drew the promotional art of all the species to give them a unified look and make any last-minute changes.

Dragonite is classified as the Dragon Pokémon, and is both a Dragon and Flying-type Pokémon, capable of using both Dragon and Flying-type attacks. It is also capable of using attacks outside of these types. Its Dragon typing makes it weak to Dragon, Ice, and Fairy-type attacks, its Flying type making it twice as weak to Ice-type attacks. It evolves from Dragonair via acquiring enough experience to level up to a specific level. Dragonair evolves from its base form, Dratini, the same way. It belongs to a category of Pokémon dubbed by fans as "pseudo-Legendary" and later named "Powerhouse Pokémon" in official work. These terms refer to the final evolution of a three-stage line that is not Legendary but have strength comparable to Legendary Pokémon, their combined stats adding up to 600 across Attack, Special Attack, Defense, Special Defense, and Speed.

A "Mega Evolved" form of Dragonite, dubbed Mega Dragonite, was introduced in the 2025 game Pokémon Legends: Z-A. Unlike regular Dragonite, Mega Dragonite incorporates several design aspects similar to Dragonair. These aspects include wings on Dragonite's head and a pearl on its tail.

=== Design ===
Standing at 7 feet 3 inches tall, Dragonite features an orange body, striped belly, and wings that are orange with a teal membrane. It has a pair of arms and legs, a tail, a snout, and a pair of antennae. This bipedal design differs from Dratini and Dragonair, both of which are blue, serpentine creatures. In Red, Blue, and Green, Dratini's belly was originally striped like Dragonite's, which was changed in Pokémon Yellow. Dragonite also had a long fin on its back that was removed beginning in Pokémon Gold and Silver. In the Pokémon series beginning with Gold and Silver, each Pokémon has a "shiny" form, a rare form that chances the color scheme of the Pokémon. Dragonite has a predominantly green shiny form.

Dragonite is said to have human levels of intelligence. It is capable of flight, said to move fast enough to circumnavigate the globe in only 16 hours. It is known for its kindhearted nature and tendency to spend time in marine settings, helping people who are in peril at sea and being capable of manipulating the weather. Dragonites are considered a rarity to encounter, living on a hidden island with Dratinis and Dragonairs. Dragonairs use their powers to control the weather to obscure the island. Despite their protective nature, it sometimes becomes enraged when disturbed and has a rivalry with fellow Dragon-type Pokémon, Kingdra.

== Appearances ==
Dragonite first appeared in Pokémon Red and Green, the latter which was replaced by Pokémon Blue outside of Japan. It is only obtainable through leveling up a Dragonair. These games have a series of opponents called the Elite Four, whose leader is Lance, a Dragon-focused trainer who features a Dragonite as his signature Pokémon. The line appears in Pokémon Gold and Silver, where Lance assists the player-character to infiltrate Team Rocket, using his Dragonite in the process. He is later fought as the Champion of the region's Elite Four, featuring three Dragonites. Dragonite appears in a similar capacity in remakes FireRed and LeafGreen, Let's Go, Pikachu! and Let's Go, Eevee!, and HeartGold and SoulSilver. It also appeared in Pokémon Sun and Moon, where its designer, Shigeki Morimoto, appears with Dragonite on his team. Dragonite has appeared in all mainline Pokémon games until Pokémon Sword and Shield, where it and its previous forms were not included alongside hundreds of other Pokémon also cut, although it and its preceding forms were eventually added in the second part of the Pokémon Sword and Shield Expansion Pass, Crown Tundra. It later appeared in Pokémon Scarlet and Violet. A Dragonite based on one of Lance's Dragonites was distributed to participants in a competitive Pokémon tournament called the Kanto Classic Wi-Fi Tournament. The 2025 game Pokémon Legends: Z-A introduced a new Mega Evolved form of Dragonite, dubbed Mega Dragonite.

Dragonite has appeared in many other Pokémon spin-off titles, including the Pokémon Mystery Dungeon series, Pokémon Snap, and Pokémon Go. Dragonite was made playable in Pokémon Unite during a holiday update in 2021 as an "All-Rounder" type. Characters in Unite get costumes called Holowear; Dragonite has received multiple Holowear outfits, including a worker's apron and a champion outfit. It also appeared in the Pokémon Trading Card Game as a card that can be used through evolving from Dratini and then Dragonair. It first appeared in the Fossil set, and has received multiple promotional cards, including one given out to promote Pokémon: The First Movie and one given out with Japanese copies of the Game Boy Color Pokémon Trading Card Game. It also makes a minor appearance in Super Smash Bros. Ultimate as a collectible item called a "Spirit" that can be used to enhance the player's character.

Dragonite makes multiple appearances in the Pokémon TV series. It first appears in the 13th episode, "Mystery of the Lighthouse". This Dragonite was considerably larger than normal and not identified in the episode as a Dragonite as no one recognized what it was due to the fog. It also appeared in the Orange Islands arc of the anime in the episode "Enter the Dragonite", being the ace of the character Drake in the region's Pokémon League tournament. It succeeds in defeating most of Ash Ketchum's team before losing to his Pikachu. It also appears in Pokémon: The First Movie, delivering an invitation to protagonist Ash Ketchum. In the Black & White series, a Dragonite is used by the character Iris. In Pokémon Journeys: The Series, Ash and fellow protagonist Goh assist a Dragonair that struggled to fly, who they assist in learning the technique Dragon Dance to help it fit in. It later evolves into Dragonite to save Ash from Team Rocket, and Ash adds it to his team, his first catch of Journeys. He includes Dragonite in his team for the Pokémon World Coronation Series, which Ash won. Following Ash's victory in this tournament and becoming the World Champion, a Dragonite based on Ash's Dragonite was given away to players in Sword and Shield. In Pokémon Horizons: The Series, Roy's rival Ult owns a Dragonite, which previously belonged to his father and is capable of Mega Evolving into Mega Dragonite. It appears in Pokémon Generations, an anime series that retells the events of the various mainline game in the episode "The Lake of Rage", which depicts Lance and his Dragonite invading Team Rocket in Gold and Silver. Dragonite starred in a short animated film titled Dragonite and the Postman about a woman who works with a Dragonite to deliver mail.

Lance appears in the Pokémon Adventures manga, featuring a Dragonite in his party. This Dragonite is aggressive, and aids Lance and the members of the Elite Four in attempts to exterminate the human race. It is later revealed that Lance's motives were due to human-caused pollution, with Dratini being a Pokémon he rescued and eventually evolving into Dragonite.

== Critical reception ==
Dragonite has been compared negatively to its preceding form, Dragonair, by multiple critics who find the design inferior or too different.

Dragonite has received generally positive reception. Crunchyroll writer Daniel Dockery expressed excitement over Ash catching a Dragonite, his favorite Pokémon, something he had been waiting to see since early in the series more than two decades ago. Dragonite's first appearance in the anime was particularly exciting for him, stating that he immediately sought out to get one after watching it. Dockery featured Dragonite in almost every Pokémon game since. Pocket Tactics writer Nathan Ellingsworth felt that Dragonite stood out in the first generation due to it (and its predecessors) being the only Dragon-type Pokémon. Aside from its mechanical usefulness, Ellingsworth praised its "round" design, attributing part of its popularity to its appearance in the first Pokémon movie. He found it strange that it has not had a new form despite its popularity, emphasizing how strange it was that a giant Dragonite appeared in the anime but that a Gigantamax form wasn't given to it despite the potential connection. CBR writer Ryan McCarthy believed that Dragonite was one of the most iconic Pokémon, attributing its popularity to being rare and strong. Commenting on its fights in Pokémon Journeys' Master Eight Tournament, he questioned why Dragonite was losing fights in such "embarrassing" ways, questioning why Pokémon hates Dragonite. He pointed out that Dragonites owned by Ash, Lance, and Iris appear to beaten easily in their respective fights. The fact that all three Dragonites getting beaten so easily, believing that this is the product of making strong Pokémon be "cannon fodder" to make weaker Pokémon seem stronger. He argued that the fight between Dragonite and Milotic was particularly illogical, stating that Dragonite had advantages over it. He also believed that it was neglected in the games, stating that it was rarely used by trainers and didn't get new forms.

Dragonite's design has been contrasted with Dragonair's, with speculation being made by fans that it was not originally intended to evolve from Dragonair. Dot Esports writer Emily Morrow explained that this speculation came from what she described as "completely different" designs. Nintendo Life staff questioned the design progression from Dragonair to Dragonite, saying that there was nothing about Dragonair's design that suggested it would evolve to gain wings or limbs. Despite this, they all agreed that Dragonite was a good Pokémon. Destructoid writer James Stephanie Sterling was critical of Dragonite for being cute instead of fearsome, further criticizing it as a downgrade from Dragonair, who they found awesome instead of a disappointment like Dragonite. TheGamer writer Jon Eakin felt that the switch didn't make sense, believing that Dragonite was more similar to Charizard than Dragonair or Dratini.

Dragonite is considered a particularly powerful Pokémon. Parade writer Oliver Brandt considered Dragonite one of the best Pokémon, attributing it to both its cuteness and power. In Red and Green, Dragonite was considered a threatening Pokémon due to its use of Wrap which, in these games, rendered the opponent unable to attack during this. USA Today writer Cian Maher considered Dragonite his favorite Dragon-type, as well as one of his favorite Pokémon of all time. He believed that it was a consistently strong Pokémon, as well as having significant appearances in the anime and side games. Emily Morrow stated that it was as close to a Legendary as a non-Legendary could, noting that Lance's Dragonites in FireRed and LeafGreen were among the more powerful opponents. In their "Pokémon of the Day" series, IGN staff felt that, despite it being powerful, it was an overrated Pokémon. They stated that its moves are powerful, noting though that its Dragon/Flying typing made it vulnerable to Ice-type moves. They argued that it was a popular Pokémon, though stating that its high level of popularity was a turnoff.

=== Mega Evolution ===
Mega Dragonite received mixed reception when it was introduced in Pokémon Legends: Z-A. Destructoid editor Kyle Ferreia described the Mega Evolution as a "de-evolution" and criticized the addition of the wings and pearls, stating that the additions make the Pokémon too similar to Dragonair. Polygon editor Patricia Hernandez wrote that fans liked the design, but also wrote that some fans were "baffled" by the wings. Hernandez also described Mega Dragonite in comparsion to Dragonite as "a beefed-up version of the golden wyrm that's adorned with majestic wings."
