= List of Pokémon =

Promotional image depicting every Pokémon introduced up to X and Y

The Pokémon franchise features 1,025 fictional creatures as of 2026. Conceived by Satoshi Tajiri in early 1989, Pokémon (short for Pocket Monsters) inhabit the fictional Pokémon world. Their designs draw from multiple inspirations, including animals, plants, and legendary creatures. Many Pokémon are capable of evolving into more powerful species, while others can undergo form changes and achieve similar results. Originally, only a handful of artists, led by Ken Sugimori, designed Pokémon. By 2013, Sugimori, alongside Hironobu Yoshida, began leading a team of 20 artists, with whom they conceive and finalize the designs.

The video game series is divided into generations, with each core series installment introducing new Pokémon species. The initial set of games, consisting of Pokémon Red, Blue, and Yellow, (Note: Red and Blue were originally released as Pocket Monsters Red and Green.) featured 151 Pokémon. The second generation―Gold, Silver and Crystal―introduced 100 Pokémon. The third generation―Ruby, Sapphire, Emerald, FireRed and LeafGreen―introduced 135 Pokémon. The fourth generation―Diamond, Pearl, Platinum, HeartGold and SoulSilver―introduced 107 Pokémon. The fifth generation―Black, White, Black 2, and White 2―introduced 156 Pokémon. The sixth generation―X, Y, Omega Ruby, and Alpha Sapphire―introduced 72 Pokémon. The seventh generation―Sun, Moon, Ultra Sun, Ultra Moon, Let's Go, Pikachu!, and Let's Go, Eevee!―introduced 88 Pokémon between the six games. The eighth generation―Sword, Shield, Brilliant Diamond, Shining Pearl, and Legends: Arceus―introduced 96 Pokémon, with 89 in Sword and Shield and 7 in Legends: Arceus. The ninth generation―Scarlet, Violet, and Legends: Z-A―introduced 120 Pokémon. The tenth generation, which will begin with Winds and Waves, has introduced three Pokémon as of February 2026.

Due to the large number of Pokémon, a listing of each species is divided into articles by generation. The 1,025 Pokémon are organized by their number in the National Pokédex—an electronic encyclopedia that provides various information on Pokémon. The National Pokédex is subdivided into a regional Pokédex, each revolving around Pokémon introduced at the time of their respective generations along pre-existing Pokémon. For example, the Johto Pokédex, generation II, covers the 100 Pokémon introduced in Gold and Silver in addition to the original 151 species. Each Pokédex follows a general ordering: first partner Pokémon are listed first, followed by species obtainable early in the respective games, and are concluded with Legendary and Mythical Pokémon. The Unova Pokédex is the only exception, beginning with the Mythical Pokémon Victini.

== Concept ==
Satoshi Tajiri—who later founded Game Freak—conceived the general concept of Pokémon in 1989, following the Game Boy's release. The name Pokémon is an abbreviation of Pocket Monsters (ポケットモンスター, Poketto Monsutā). The concept stems most notably from Tajiri's childhood hobby of insect collecting. Other influences include Ultraman, anime, and video games in general. Throughout his early life, Tajiri saw his rural, nature-filled hometown transform into an urban centre. This drove away wildlife, and he and others living in the area were eventually unable to collect insects. Through Pokémon, Tajiri sought to bring back this outdoor pastime and share it with the world. The first games in the franchise, Pocket MonstersRed and Green, were released on 27 February 1996 in Japan for the Game Boy. The games were internationally released as Red and Blue in September 1998. The ability to capture, battle, trade, and care for the Pokémon led to international popularity, and it eventually became a multibillion-dollar franchise and the second-best selling video game series after the Mario franchise.

At the start of a main series Pokémon game, the player character receives one of three Pokémon to become their first partner, (Note: Official promotional sources have preferred the use of first partner or first partner Pokémon since at least 2019.) with which they can battle and catch other Pokémon. Each Pokémon has one or two types, such as Grass, Fire, and Water. In battle, certain types are strong against other types. For example, a Fire-type move will do more damage to a Grass-type Pokémon, while a Water-type Pokémon will take less damage. This form of gameplay is frequently compared to that of rock-paper-scissors, though players have to strategize which Pokémon and which of their attacks to use against various opponents.

Many species of Pokémon can evolve into a larger and more powerful creature. The change is accompanied by stat changes—generally a modest increase—and access to a wider variety of attacks. There are multiple ways to trigger an evolution, including reaching a particular level, using a special stone, or learning a specific attack. For example, at level 16, Bulbasaur can evolve into Ivysaur. Most notably, the Normal-type Eevee can evolve into eight different Pokémon: Jolteon (Electric), Flareon (Fire), Vaporeon (Water), Umbreon (Dark), Espeon (Psychic), Leafeon (Grass), Glaceon (Ice), and Sylveon (Fairy). In generation VI, the games introduced a new mechanic called Mega Evolution, as well as a subset of Mega Evolution called Primal Reversion. Unlike normal evolution, Mega Evolution and Primal Reversion last only for the duration of a battle during the generation VI and VII games, with the Pokémon reverting to its normal form at the end. In the 2025 generation IX game Pokémon Legends: Z-A, Mega Evolution can last through multiple battles, and runs out after a period of time. As of Pokémon Legends: Z-A, 73 Pokémon can undergo Mega Evolution or Primal Reversion. In contrast, some species such as Castform, Rotom, Unown, and Lycanroc undergo form changes, which may provide stat buffs or changes and type alterations but are not considered new species. Some Pokémon have differences in appearance due to gender. Pokémon can be male or female, male-only, female-only, or of an unknown gender.

The Pokémon franchise is primarily intended for younger players. However, each Pokémon has various complex attributes such as natures, characteristic traits, Individual Values (IVs) and Effort Values (EVs). These are intended for people "who enjoy battling and want to go more in depth", according to Game Freak Board Director Junichi Masuda. These individual statistics were also included, because the basic concept of the franchise is to train one's Pokémon. Designer Takeshi Kawachimaru stated that IVs and EVs "help to make each Pokémon in the game individual", as it adds unique aspects to them. Each Pokémon game introduces a few "Legendary" and "Mythical" Pokémon that are powerful, rare, and hard to catch. Pokémon Sun and Moon introduced "Ultra Beasts", which are described as "beings from another dimension" that appeared in the Alola region, and are similarly powerful and rare.

== Design and development ==
The evolution mechanic is most prominently displayed through Eevee (center) and its eight evolutions. Each one requires a different method to evolve.

Throughout development of Red and Green, all Pokémon were designed by Ken Sugimori who was a long-time friend of Tajiri, and by a team of fewer than ten people, including Atsuko Nishida who is credited as the designer of Pikachu. By 2013, a team of 20 artists worked together to create new species designs. A committee of five people determine which designs are incorporated into the games, with Sugimori and Hironobu Yoshida finalizing the look of each creature. Sugimori is also responsible for the "Box Art" Legendary Pokémon and all of the official artwork for the games. According to Yoshida, the number of rejected Pokémon designs is five to ten times more than the number that are finalized in each game. In rare cases, rejected designs are brought back and released in a later generation. Shigeru Ohmori, director of Sun and Moon, admitted that creating new Pokémon has become a difficult task with the sheer number of creatures designed over the franchise's 20-year history. Each iteration of the series has brought both praise and criticism over the numerous creatures.

The designs for Pokémon are often highly analogous to real-life creatures but also encompass inanimate objects. Director Junichi Masuda and graphic designer Takao Unno have stated that inspiration for Pokémon designs can come from anything. The variety of animals and culture around the world provide the basis for having countless ideas incorporated into the franchise. The environment that a Pokémon would live in is taken into account when they are designed. The lei-like Comfey fits appropriately in the Hawaii-inspired Alola region of Sun and Moon. Masuda has stated that each element of a design has a functioning reason. In some cases, the design team creates a footprint that a Pokémon could make and designs a creature around that. Some designers look to game mechanics for inspiration and see where particular typing combinations could be interesting. Typing assignment varies during the design process; sometimes a Pokémon receives a type after it is created and other times they are designed around a particular type. Each Pokémon has a specific height and weight.

The simpler roots of designs in generation I prompted greater complexity in later games. Designs in general have become increasingly complex and thematic in newer games. Sneasel, for example, draws inspiration from the Japanese yōkai kamaitachi, mythical creatures with fast, razor-sharp claws that hunt in packs. These elements are all found in Sneasel's design and characteristics. New Pokémon introduced in generation VI, for example, are heavily influenced by the culture and fauna of Europe (namely France). However, by the release of X and Y in 2013, Sugimori stated that he wishes for Pokémon design to return to the simpler roots of the franchise.

Masuda considers the first partner Pokémon among the most important in the franchise. Yoshida goes further and calls them "the face of that generation" and says that "they're the ones that should be on the packaging". The three Pokémon players start out with in each generation are always Grass-, Water-, and Fire-types, a trio that Masuda considers the easiest to understand for new players. Their designs are based on recognizable animals and made to stand out from pre-existing Pokémon. Each are also given distinct personalities to further define them. In an interview with GamesRadar in 2009, Masuda stated that simple Pokémon take around six months to design and develop, and that Pokémon that play a more important part in the games may take over a year. Masuda added, "We also want the designer to have as much freedom as possible; we don't want to narrow their imagination by saying, 'We want this kind of Pokemon.' When we talk to the designer we always stress that they shouldn't think of Pokemon necessarily, but should instead just be as creative as they can." After the Pokémon is designed, it is sent to the "Battle Producer", who decides which moves and stats the Pokémon should have.

== List of Pokémon ==
List of Pokémon generations
Generation	Years	Region	Titles	Platforms	Number of Pokémon		
Generation	Years	Region	Titles	Platforms	New in games	New in generation	Total
I	1996–1999	Kanto	Red, Green, Blue, and Yellow	Game Boy, Nintendo 3DS (Note: The Generation I and II main series games were later re-released via the Nintendo 3DS eShop in 2016–2018, with the Generation I titles being in celebration of the franchise's 20th anniversary.)	151		
II	1999–2002	Johto, Kanto	Gold, Silver, and Crystal	Game Boy Color, Nintendo 3DS	100		251
III	2002–2006	Hoenn	Ruby, Sapphire, and Emerald	Game Boy Advance	135	135	386
III	2002–2006	Kanto	FireRed and LeafGreen	Game Boy Advance	None	135	386
IV	2006–2010	Sinnoh	Diamond, Pearl, and Platinum	Nintendo DS	107	107	493
IV	2006–2010	Johto, Kanto	HeartGold and SoulSilver	Nintendo DS	None	107	493
V	2010–2013	Unova	Black and White	Nintendo DS	156	156	649
V	2010–2013	Unova	Black 2 and White 2	Nintendo DS	None	156	649
VI	2013–2016	Kalos	X and Y	Nintendo 3DS	72	72	721
VI	2013–2016	Hoenn	Omega Ruby and Alpha Sapphire	Nintendo 3DS	None	72	721
VII	2016–2019	Alola	Sun and Moon	Nintendo 3DS	81	88	809
VII	2016–2019	Alola	Ultra Sun and Ultra Moon	Nintendo 3DS	5	88	809
VII	2016–2019	Kanto	Let's Go, Pikachu! and Let's Go, Eevee!	Nintendo Switch	2 (Note: Two Pokémon, Meltan and Melmetal, were introduced in a 2018 update to the spin-off game Pokémon Go. Let's Go, Pikachu! and Let's Go, Eevee! include Meltan and Melmetal as playable Pokémon only through being transferred over from Pokémon Go.)	88	809
VIII	2019–2022	Galar	Sword and Shield	Nintendo Switch	81	96	905
VIII	2019–2022	Galar	The Isle of Armor expansion	Nintendo Switch	3	96	905
VIII	2019–2022	Galar	The Crown Tundra expansion	Nintendo Switch	5	96	905
VIII	2019–2022	Sinnoh	Brilliant Diamond and Shining Pearl	Nintendo Switch	None	96	905
VIII	2019–2022	Hisui (Note: Hisui was the ancient name for the region of Sinnoh)	Legends: Arceus	Nintendo Switch	7	96	905
IX	2022–2027	Paldea	Scarlet and Violet	Nintendo Switch	105 (Note: Two Paradox Pokémon, Walking Wake and Iron Leaves, were added post-release in an online event starting 27 February 2023.)	120	1025
IX	2022–2027	Kitakami	The Teal Mask expansion	Nintendo Switch	7	120	1025
IX	2022–2027	Unova, Paldea	The Indigo Disk expansion	Nintendo Switch	7	120	1025
IX	2022–2027	Kitakami	Mochi Mayhem expansion	Nintendo Switch	1	120	1025
IX	2022–2027	Kalos	Legends: Z-A	Nintendo Switch, Nintendo Switch 2	None	120	1025
IX	2022–2027	Kalos	Mega Dimension expansion	Nintendo Switch, Nintendo Switch 2	None	120	1025
X	2027	???	Winds and Waves	Nintendo Switch 2	≥3		≥1028

=== List of species ===
Pokémon species glossary
Key
Color / Letter	Meaning	Description
S	Starter Pokémon (known officially as First Partner Pokémon)	The first Pokémon a player is able to obtain in the main-line games.
F	Fossil Pokémon	Ancient Pokémon only obtained by resurrecting fossils and their evolutions.
B	Baby Pokémon	Infant Pokémon primarily obtained by breeding their evolved forms.
L	Legendary Pokémon	Powerful Pokémon associated with the legends and lore of the Pokémon world.
M	Mythical Pokémon	Pokémon only obtainable through rare circumstances, such as distribution events. (Note: Certain mythical Pokémon are permanently obtainable in-game, being Deoxys in Omega Ruby and Alpha Sapphire, Magearna in Sun, Moon, Ultra Sun and Ultra Moon, Celebi in the Virtual Console version of Crystal, Keldeo in Sword and Shield's The Crown Tundra expansion, Mew, Jirachi, Darkrai and Arceus in Brilliant Diamond and Shining Pearl, Manaphy, Phione, Shaymin, Darkrai and Arceus in Legends: Arceus, and Meloetta in Scarlet and Violet's The Indigo Disk expansion.)
UB	Ultra Beast	Certain Pokémon from another dimension.
P	Paradox Pokémon	Pokémon resembling ancient or futuristic relatives of a modern-day Pokémon.

List of Pokémon species names by generation
Generation I		Generation II		Generation III		Generation IV		Generation V		Generation VI		Generation VII		Generation VIII		Generation IX		Generation X	
Dex #	Name	Dex #	Name	Dex #	Name	Dex #	Name	Dex #	Name	Dex #	Name	Dex #	Name	Dex #	Name	Dex #	Name	Dex #	Name
1	Bulbasaur^{S}	152	Chikorita^{S}	252	Treecko^{S}	387	Turtwig^{S}	494	Victini^{M}	650	Chespin^{S}	722	Rowlet^{S}	810	Grookey^{S}	906	Sprigatito^{S}	???	Browt^{S}
2	Ivysaur	153	Bayleef	253	Grovyle	388	Grotle	495	Snivy^{S}	651	Quilladin	723	Dartrix	811	Thwackey	907	Floragato	???	Pombon^{S}
3	Venusaur	154	Meganium	254	Sceptile	389	Torterra	496	Servine	652	Chesnaught	724	Decidueye	812	Rillaboom	908	Meowscarada	???	Gecqua^{S}
4	Charmander^{S}	155	Cyndaquil^{S}	255	Torchic^{S}	390	Chimchar^{S}	497	Serperior	653	Fennekin^{S}	725	Litten^{S}	813	Scorbunny^{S}	909	Fuecoco^{S}	No additional Pokémon (as of 27 February 2026)	
5	Charmeleon	156	Quilava	256	Combusken	391	Monferno	498	Tepig^{S}	654	Braixen	726	Torracat	814	Raboot	910	Crocalor	No additional Pokémon (as of 27 February 2026)	
6	Charizard	157	Typhlosion	257	Blaziken	392	Infernape	499	Pignite	655	Delphox	727	Incineroar	815	Cinderace	911	Skeledirge	No additional Pokémon (as of 27 February 2026)	
7	Squirtle^{S}	158	Totodile^{S}	258	Mudkip^{S}	393	Piplup^{S}	500	Emboar	656	Froakie^{S}	728	Popplio^{S}	816	Sobble^{S}	912	Quaxly^{S}	No additional Pokémon (as of 27 February 2026)	
8	Wartortle	159	Croconaw	259	Marshtomp	394	Prinplup	501	Oshawott^{S}	657	Frogadier	729	Brionne	817	Drizzile	913	Quaxwell	No additional Pokémon (as of 27 February 2026)	
9	Blastoise	160	Feraligatr	260	Swampert	395	Empoleon	502	Dewott	658	Greninja	730	Primarina	818	Inteleon	914	Quaquaval	No additional Pokémon (as of 27 February 2026)	
10	Caterpie	161	Sentret	261	Poochyena	396	Starly	503	Samurott	659	Bunnelby	731	Pikipek	819	Skwovet	915	Lechonk	No additional Pokémon (as of 27 February 2026)	
11	Metapod	162	Furret	262	Mightyena	397	Staravia	504	Patrat	660	Diggersby	732	Trumbeak	820	Greedent	916	Oinkologne	No additional Pokémon (as of 27 February 2026)	
12	Butterfree	163	Hoothoot	263	Zigzagoon	398	Staraptor	505	Watchog	661	Fletchling	733	Toucannon	821	Rookidee	917	Tarountula	No additional Pokémon (as of 27 February 2026)	
13	Weedle	164	Noctowl	264	Linoone	399	Bidoof	506	Lillipup	662	Fletchinder	734	Yungoos	822	Corvisquire	918	Spidops	No additional Pokémon (as of 27 February 2026)	
14	Kakuna	165	Ledyba	265	Wurmple	400	Bibarel	507	Herdier	663	Talonflame	735	Gumshoos	823	Corviknight	919	Nymble	No additional Pokémon (as of 27 February 2026)	
15	Beedrill	166	Ledian	266	Silcoon	401	Kricketot	508	Stoutland	664	Scatterbug	736	Grubbin	824	Blipbug	920	Lokix	No additional Pokémon (as of 27 February 2026)	
16	Pidgey	167	Spinarak	267	Beautifly	402	Kricketune	509	Purrloin	665	Spewpa	737	Charjabug	825	Dottler	921	Pawmi	No additional Pokémon (as of 27 February 2026)	
17	Pidgeotto	168	Ariados	268	Cascoon	403	Shinx	510	Liepard	666	Vivillon	738	Vikavolt	826	Orbeetle	922	Pawmo	No additional Pokémon (as of 27 February 2026)	
18	Pidgeot	169	Crobat	269	Dustox	404	Luxio	511	Pansage	667	Litleo	739	Crabrawler	827	Nickit	923	Pawmot	No additional Pokémon (as of 27 February 2026)	
19	Rattata	170	Chinchou	270	Lotad	405	Luxray	512	Simisage	668	Pyroar	740	Crabominable	828	Thievul	924	Tandemaus	No additional Pokémon (as of 27 February 2026)	
20	Raticate	171	Lanturn	271	Lombre	406	Budew^{B} (Note: Legends: Arceus and Legends: Z-A have no breeding mechanic. Consequently Pichu, Cleffa, Budew, Chingling, Mime Jr. and Riolu can only be found in the wild in either game, and Togepi, Elekid, Magby, Bonsly, Happiny, Munchlax, and Mantyke can only be found in the wild in Legends: Arceus.)	513	Pansear	669	Flabébé	741	Oricorio	829	Gossifleur	925	Maushold	No additional Pokémon (as of 27 February 2026)	
21	Spearow	172	Pichu^{B}	272	Ludicolo	407	Roserade	514	Simisear	670	Floette	742	Cutiefly	830	Eldegoss	926	Fidough	No additional Pokémon (as of 27 February 2026)	
22	Fearow	173	Cleffa^{B}	273	Seedot	408	Cranidos^{F} (Note: Although Cranidos, Rampardos, Shieldon and Bastiodon are Fossil Pokémon, they are only obtainable in the wild in Legends: Arceus and Tyrunt, Tyrantrum, Amaura and Aurorus are obtanable in the wild (as well as being able to be revived from Fossils) in Legends Z-A.)	515	Panpour	671	Florges	743	Ribombee	831	Wooloo	927	Dachsbun	No additional Pokémon (as of 27 February 2026)	
23	Ekans	174	Igglybuff^{B}	274	Nuzleaf	409	Rampardos^{F}	516	Simipour	672	Skiddo	744	Rockruff	832	Dubwool	928	Smoliv	No additional Pokémon (as of 27 February 2026)	
24	Arbok	175	Togepi^{B}	275	Shiftry	410	Shieldon^{F}	517	Munna	673	Gogoat	745	Lycanroc	833	Chewtle	929	Dolliv	No additional Pokémon (as of 27 February 2026)	
25	Pikachu^{S}	176	Togetic	276	Taillow	411	Bastiodon^{F}	518	Musharna	674	Pancham	746	Wishiwashi	834	Drednaw	930	Arboliva	No additional Pokémon (as of 27 February 2026)	
26	Raichu	177	Natu	277	Swellow	412	Burmy	519	Pidove	675	Pangoro	747	Mareanie	835	Yamper	931	Squawkabilly	No additional Pokémon (as of 27 February 2026)	
27	Sandshrew	178	Xatu	278	Wingull	413	Wormadam	520	Tranquill	676	Furfrou	748	Toxapex	836	Boltund	932	Nacli	No additional Pokémon (as of 27 February 2026)	
28	Sandslash	179	Mareep	279	Pelipper	414	Mothim	521	Unfezant	677	Espurr	749	Mudbray	837	Rolycoly	933	Naclstack	No additional Pokémon (as of 27 February 2026)	
29	Nidoran♀	180	Flaaffy	280	Ralts	415	Combee	522	Blitzle	678	Meowstic	750	Mudsdale	838	Carkol	934	Garganacl	No additional Pokémon (as of 27 February 2026)	
30	Nidorina	181	Ampharos	281	Kirlia	416	Vespiquen	523	Zebstrika	679	Honedge	751	Dewpider	839	Coalossal	935	Charcadet	No additional Pokémon (as of 27 February 2026)	
31	Nidoqueen	182	Bellossom	282	Gardevoir	417	Pachirisu	524	Roggenrola	680	Doublade	752	Araquanid	840	Applin	936	Armarouge	No additional Pokémon (as of 27 February 2026)	
32	Nidoran♂	183	Marill	283	Surskit	418	Buizel	525	Boldore	681	Aegislash	753	Fomantis	841	Flapple	937	Ceruledge	No additional Pokémon (as of 27 February 2026)	
33	Nidorino	184	Azumarill	284	Masquerain	419	Floatzel	526	Gigalith	682	Spritzee	754	Lurantis	842	Appletun	938	Tadbulb	No additional Pokémon (as of 27 February 2026)	
34	Nidoking	185	Sudowoodo	285	Shroomish	420	Cherubi	527	Woobat	683	Aromatisse	755	Morelull	843	Silicobra	939	Bellibolt	No additional Pokémon (as of 27 February 2026)	
35	Clefairy	186	Politoed	286	Breloom	421	Cherrim	528	Swoobat	684	Swirlix	756	Shiinotic	844	Sandaconda	940	Wattrel	No additional Pokémon (as of 27 February 2026)	
36	Clefable	187	Hoppip	287	Slakoth	422	Shellos	529	Drilbur	685	Slurpuff	757	Salandit	845	Cramorant	941	Kilowattrel	No additional Pokémon (as of 27 February 2026)	
37	Vulpix	188	Skiploom	288	Vigoroth	423	Gastrodon	530	Excadrill	686	Inkay	758	Salazzle	846	Arrokuda	942	Maschiff	No additional Pokémon (as of 27 February 2026)	
38	Ninetales	189	Jumpluff	289	Slaking	424	Ambipom	531	Audino	687	Malamar	759	Stufful	847	Barraskewda	943	Mabosstiff	No additional Pokémon (as of 27 February 2026)	
39	Jigglypuff	190	Aipom	290	Nincada	425	Drifloon	532	Timburr	688	Binacle	760	Bewear	848	Toxel^{B}	944	Shroodle	No additional Pokémon (as of 27 February 2026)	
40	Wigglytuff	191	Sunkern	291	Ninjask	426	Drifblim	533	Gurdurr	689	Barbaracle	761	Bounsweet	849	Toxtricity	945	Grafaiai	No additional Pokémon (as of 27 February 2026)	
41	Zubat	192	Sunflora	292	Shedinja	427	Buneary	534	Conkeldurr	690	Skrelp	762	Steenee	850	Sizzlipede	946	Bramblin	No additional Pokémon (as of 27 February 2026)	
42	Golbat	193	Yanma	293	Whismur	428	Lopunny	535	Tympole	691	Dragalge	763	Tsareena	851	Centiskorch	947	Brambleghast	No additional Pokémon (as of 27 February 2026)	
43	Oddish	194	Wooper	294	Loudred	429	Mismagius	536	Palpitoad	692	Clauncher	764	Comfey	852	Clobbopus	948	Toedscool	No additional Pokémon (as of 27 February 2026)	
44	Gloom	195	Quagsire	295	Exploud	430	Honchkrow	537	Seismitoad	693	Clawitzer	765	Oranguru	853	Grapploct	949	Toedscruel	No additional Pokémon (as of 27 February 2026)	
45	Vileplume	196	Espeon	296	Makuhita	431	Glameow	538	Throh	694	Helioptile	766	Passimian	854	Sinistea	950	Klawf	No additional Pokémon (as of 27 February 2026)	
46	Paras	197	Umbreon	297	Hariyama	432	Purugly	539	Sawk	695	Heliolisk	767	Wimpod	855	Polteageist	951	Capsakid	No additional Pokémon (as of 27 February 2026)	
47	Parasect	198	Murkrow	298	Azurill^{B}	433	Chingling^{B}	540	Sewaddle	696	Tyrunt^{F}	768	Golisopod	856	Hatenna	952	Scovillain	No additional Pokémon (as of 27 February 2026)	
48	Venonat	199	Slowking	299	Nosepass	434	Stunky	541	Swadloon	697	Tyrantrum^{F}	769	Sandygast	857	Hattrem	953	Rellor	No additional Pokémon (as of 27 February 2026)	
49	Venomoth	200	Misdreavus	300	Skitty	435	Skuntank	542	Leavanny	698	Amaura^{F}	770	Palossand	858	Hatterene	954	Rabsca	No additional Pokémon (as of 27 February 2026)	
50	Diglett	201	Unown	301	Delcatty	436	Bronzor	543	Venipede	699	Aurorus^{F}	771	Pyukumuku	859	Impidimp	955	Flittle	No additional Pokémon (as of 27 February 2026)	
51	Dugtrio	202	Wobbuffet	302	Sableye	437	Bronzong	544	Whirlipede	700	Sylveon	772	Type: Null^{L}	860	Morgrem	956	Espathra	No additional Pokémon (as of 27 February 2026)	
52	Meowth	203	Girafarig	303	Mawile	438	Bonsly^{B}	545	Scolipede	701	Hawlucha	773	Silvally^{L}	861	Grimmsnarl	957	Tinkatink	No additional Pokémon (as of 27 February 2026)	
53	Persian	204	Pineco	304	Aron	439	Mime Jr.^{B}	546	Cottonee	702	Dedenne	774	Minior	862	Obstagoon	958	Tinkatuff	No additional Pokémon (as of 27 February 2026)	
54	Psyduck	205	Forretress	305	Lairon	440	Happiny^{B}	547	Whimsicott	703	Carbink	775	Komala	863	Perrserker	959	Tinkaton	No additional Pokémon (as of 27 February 2026)	
55	Golduck	206	Dunsparce	306	Aggron	441	Chatot	548	Petilil	704	Goomy	776	Turtonator	864	Cursola	960	Wiglett	No additional Pokémon (as of 27 February 2026)	
56	Mankey	207	Gligar	307	Meditite	442	Spiritomb	549	Lilligant	705	Sliggoo	777	Togedemaru	865	Sirfetch'd	961	Wugtrio	No additional Pokémon (as of 27 February 2026)	
57	Primeape	208	Steelix	308	Medicham	443	Gible	550	Basculin	706	Goodra	778	Mimikyu	866	Mr. Rime	962	Bombirdier	No additional Pokémon (as of 27 February 2026)	
58	Growlithe	209	Snubbull	309	Electrike	444	Gabite	551	Sandile	707	Klefki	779	Bruxish	867	Runerigus	963	Finizen	No additional Pokémon (as of 27 February 2026)	
59	Arcanine	210	Granbull	310	Manectric	445	Garchomp	552	Krokorok	708	Phantump	780	Drampa	868	Milcery	964	Palafin	No additional Pokémon (as of 27 February 2026)	
60	Poliwag	211	Qwilfish	311	Plusle	446	Munchlax^{B}	553	Krookodile	709	Trevenant	781	Dhelmise	869	Alcremie	965	Varoom	No additional Pokémon (as of 27 February 2026)	
61	Poliwhirl	212	Scizor	312	Minun	447	Riolu^{B}	554	Darumaka	710	Pumpkaboo	782	Jangmo-o	870	Falinks	966	Revavroom	No additional Pokémon (as of 27 February 2026)	
62	Poliwrath	213	Shuckle	313	Volbeat	448	Lucario	555	Darmanitan	711	Gourgeist	783	Hakamo-o	871	Pincurchin	967	Cyclizar	No additional Pokémon (as of 27 February 2026)	
63	Abra	214	Heracross	314	Illumise	449	Hippopotas	556	Maractus	712	Bergmite	784	Kommo-o	872	Snom	968	Orthworm	No additional Pokémon (as of 27 February 2026)	
64	Kadabra	215	Sneasel	315	Roselia	450	Hippowdon	557	Dwebble	713	Avalugg	785	Tapu Koko^{L}	873	Frosmoth	969	Glimmet	No additional Pokémon (as of 27 February 2026)	
65	Alakazam	216	Teddiursa	316	Gulpin	451	Skorupi	558	Crustle	714	Noibat	786	Tapu Lele^{L}	874	Stonjourner	970	Glimmora	No additional Pokémon (as of 27 February 2026)	
66	Machop	217	Ursaring	317	Swalot	452	Drapion	559	Scraggy	715	Noivern	787	Tapu Bulu^{L}	875	Eiscue	971	Greavard	No additional Pokémon (as of 27 February 2026)	
67	Machoke	218	Slugma	318	Carvanha	453	Croagunk	560	Scrafty	716	Xerneas^{L}	788	Tapu Fini^{L}	876	Indeedee	972	Houndstone	No additional Pokémon (as of 27 February 2026)	
68	Machamp	219	Magcargo	319	Sharpedo	454	Toxicroak	561	Sigilyph	717	Yveltal^{L}	789	Cosmog^{L}	877	Morpeko	973	Flamigo	No additional Pokémon (as of 27 February 2026)	
69	Bellsprout	220	Swinub	320	Wailmer	455	Carnivine	562	Yamask	718	Zygarde^{L}	790	Cosmoem^{L}	878	Cufant	974	Cetoddle	No additional Pokémon (as of 27 February 2026)	
70	Weepinbell	221	Piloswine	321	Wailord	456	Finneon	563	Cofagrigus	719	Diancie^{M}	791	Solgaleo^{L}	879	Copperajah	975	Cetitan	No additional Pokémon (as of 27 February 2026)	
71	Victreebel	222	Corsola	322	Numel	457	Lumineon	564	Tirtouga^{F}	720	Hoopa^{M}	792	Lunala^{L}	880	Dracozolt^{F}	976	Veluza	No additional Pokémon (as of 27 February 2026)	
72	Tentacool	223	Remoraid	323	Camerupt	458	Mantyke^{B}	565	Carracosta^{F}	721	Volcanion^{M}	793	Nihilego^{UB}	881	Arctozolt^{F}	977	Dondozo	No additional Pokémon (as of 27 February 2026)	
73	Tentacruel	224	Octillery	324	Torkoal	459	Snover	566	Archen^{F}			794	Buzzwole^{UB}	882	Dracovish^{F}	978	Tatsugiri	No additional Pokémon (as of 27 February 2026)	
74	Geodude	225	Delibird	325	Spoink	460	Abomasnow	567	Archeops^{F}			795	Pheromosa^{UB}	883	Arctovish^{F}	979	Annihilape	No additional Pokémon (as of 27 February 2026)	
75	Graveler	226	Mantine	326	Grumpig	461	Weavile	568	Trubbish			796	Xurkitree^{UB}	884	Duraludon	980	Clodsire	No additional Pokémon (as of 27 February 2026)	
76	Golem	227	Skarmory	327	Spinda	462	Magnezone	569	Garbodor			797	Celesteela^{UB}	885	Dreepy	981	Farigiraf	No additional Pokémon (as of 27 February 2026)	
77	Ponyta	228	Houndour	328	Trapinch	463	Lickilicky	570	Zorua			798	Kartana^{UB}	886	Drakloak	982	Dudunsparce	No additional Pokémon (as of 27 February 2026)	
78	Rapidash	229	Houndoom	329	Vibrava	464	Rhyperior	571	Zoroark			799	Guzzlord^{UB}	887	Dragapult	983	Kingambit	No additional Pokémon (as of 27 February 2026)	
79	Slowpoke	230	Kingdra	330	Flygon	465	Tangrowth	572	Minccino			800	Necrozma^{L}	888	Zacian^{L}	984	Great Tusk^{P}	No additional Pokémon (as of 27 February 2026)	
80	Slowbro	231	Phanpy	331	Cacnea	466	Electivire	573	Cinccino			801	Magearna^{M}	889	Zamazenta^{L}	985	Scream Tail^{P}	No additional Pokémon (as of 27 February 2026)	
81	Magnemite	232	Donphan	332	Cacturne	467	Magmortar	574	Gothita			802	Marshadow^{M}	890	Eternatus^{L}	986	Brute Bonnet^{P}	No additional Pokémon (as of 27 February 2026)	
82	Magneton	233	Porygon2	333	Swablu	468	Togekiss	575	Gothorita			803	Poipole^{UB}	891	Kubfu^{L}	987	Flutter Mane^{P}	No additional Pokémon (as of 27 February 2026)	
83	Farfetch'd	234	Stantler	334	Altaria	469	Yanmega	576	Gothitelle			804	Naganadel^{UB}	892	Urshifu^{L}	988	Slither Wing^{P}	No additional Pokémon (as of 27 February 2026)	
84	Doduo	235	Smeargle	335	Zangoose	470	Leafeon	577	Solosis			805	Stakataka^{UB}	893	Zarude^{M}	989	Sandy Shocks^{P}	No additional Pokémon (as of 27 February 2026)	
85	Dodrio	236	Tyrogue^{B}	336	Seviper	471	Glaceon	578	Duosion			806	Blacephalon^{UB}	894	Regieleki^{L}	990	Iron Treads^{P}	No additional Pokémon (as of 27 February 2026)	
86	Seel	237	Hitmontop	337	Lunatone	472	Gliscor	579	Reuniclus			807	Zeraora^{M}	895	Regidrago^{L}	991	Iron Bundle^{P}	No additional Pokémon (as of 27 February 2026)	
87	Dewgong	238	Smoochum^{B}	338	Solrock	473	Mamoswine	580	Ducklett			808	Meltan^{M}	896	Glastrier^{L}	992	Iron Hands^{P}	No additional Pokémon (as of 27 February 2026)	
88	Grimer	239	Elekid^{B}	339	Barboach	474	Porygon-Z	581	Swanna			809	Melmetal^{M}	897	Spectrier^{L}	993	Iron Jugulis^{P}	No additional Pokémon (as of 27 February 2026)	
89	Muk	240	Magby^{B}	340	Whiscash	475	Gallade	582	Vanillite					898	Calyrex^{L}	994	Iron Moth^{P}	No additional Pokémon (as of 27 February 2026)	
90	Shellder	241	Miltank	341	Corphish	476	Probopass	583	Vanillish					899	Wyrdeer	995	Iron Thorns^{P}	No additional Pokémon (as of 27 February 2026)	
91	Cloyster	242	Blissey	342	Crawdaunt	477	Dusknoir	584	Vanilluxe					900	Kleavor	996	Frigibax	No additional Pokémon (as of 27 February 2026)	
92	Gastly	243	Raikou^{L}	343	Baltoy	478	Froslass	585	Deerling					901	Ursaluna	997	Arctibax	No additional Pokémon (as of 27 February 2026)	
93	Haunter	244	Entei^{L}	344	Claydol	479	Rotom	586	Sawsbuck					902	Basculegion	998	Baxcalibur	No additional Pokémon (as of 27 February 2026)	
94	Gengar	245	Suicune^{L}	345	Lileep^{F}	480	Uxie^{L}	587	Emolga					903	Sneasler	999	Gimmighoul	No additional Pokémon (as of 27 February 2026)	
95	Onix	246	Larvitar	346	Cradily^{F}	481	Mesprit^{L}	588	Karrablast					904	Overqwil	1000	Gholdengo	No additional Pokémon (as of 27 February 2026)	
96	Drowzee	247	Pupitar	347	Anorith^{F}	482	Azelf^{L}	589	Escavalier					905	Enamorus^{L}	1001	Wo-Chien^{L}	No additional Pokémon (as of 27 February 2026)	
97	Hypno	248	Tyranitar	348	Armaldo^{F}	483	Dialga^{L}	590	Foongus							1002	Chien-Pao^{L}	No additional Pokémon (as of 27 February 2026)	
98	Krabby	249	Lugia^{L}	349	Feebas	484	Palkia^{L}	591	Amoonguss							1003	Ting-Lu^{L}	No additional Pokémon (as of 27 February 2026)	
99	Kingler	250	Ho-oh^{L}	350	Milotic	485	Heatran^{L}	592	Frillish							1004	Chi-Yu^{L}	No additional Pokémon (as of 27 February 2026)	
100	Voltorb	251	Celebi^{M}	351	Castform	486	Regigigas^{L}	593	Jellicent							1005	Roaring Moon^{P}	No additional Pokémon (as of 27 February 2026)	
101	Electrode			352	Kecleon	487	Giratina^{L}	594	Alomomola							1006	Iron Valiant^{P}	No additional Pokémon (as of 27 February 2026)	
102	Exeggcute			353	Shuppet	488	Cresselia^{L}	595	Joltik							1007	Koraidon^{LP}	No additional Pokémon (as of 27 February 2026)	
103	Exeggutor			354	Banette	489	Phione^{M}	596	Galvantula							1008	Miraidon^{LP}	No additional Pokémon (as of 27 February 2026)	
104	Cubone			355	Duskull	490	Manaphy^{M}	597	Ferroseed							1009	Walking Wake^{P}	No additional Pokémon (as of 27 February 2026)	
105	Marowak			356	Dusclops	491	Darkrai^{M}	598	Ferrothorn							1010	Iron Leaves^{P}	No additional Pokémon (as of 27 February 2026)	
106	Hitmonlee			357	Tropius	492	Shaymin^{M}	599	Klink							1011	Dipplin	No additional Pokémon (as of 27 February 2026)	
107	Hitmonchan			358	Chimecho	493	Arceus^{M}	600	Klang							1012	Poltchageist	No additional Pokémon (as of 27 February 2026)	
108	Lickitung			359	Absol			601	Klinklang							1013	Sinistcha	No additional Pokémon (as of 27 February 2026)	
109	Koffing			360	Wynaut^{B}			602	Tynamo							1014	Okidogi^{L}	No additional Pokémon (as of 27 February 2026)	
110	Weezing			361	Snorunt			603	Eelektrik							1015	Munkidori^{L}	No additional Pokémon (as of 27 February 2026)	
111	Rhyhorn			362	Glalie			604	Eelektross							1016	Fezandipiti^{L}	No additional Pokémon (as of 27 February 2026)	
112	Rhydon			363	Spheal			605	Elgyem							1017	Ogerpon^{L}	No additional Pokémon (as of 27 February 2026)	
113	Chansey			364	Sealeo			606	Beheeyem							1018	Archaludon	No additional Pokémon (as of 27 February 2026)	
114	Tangela			365	Walrein			607	Litwick							1019	Hydrapple	No additional Pokémon (as of 27 February 2026)	
115	Kangaskhan			366	Clamperl			608	Lampent							1020	Gouging Fire^{P}	No additional Pokémon (as of 27 February 2026)	
116	Horsea			367	Huntail			609	Chandelure							1021	Raging Bolt^{P}	No additional Pokémon (as of 27 February 2026)	
117	Seadra			368	Gorebyss			610	Axew							1022	Iron Boulder^{P}	No additional Pokémon (as of 27 February 2026)	
118	Goldeen			369	Relicanth			611	Fraxure							1023	Iron Crown^{P}	No additional Pokémon (as of 27 February 2026)	
119	Seaking			370	Luvdisc			612	Haxorus							1024	Terapagos^{L}	No additional Pokémon (as of 27 February 2026)	
120	Staryu			371	Bagon			613	Cubchoo							1025	Pecharunt^{M}	No additional Pokémon (as of 27 February 2026)	
121	Starmie			372	Shelgon			614	Beartic									No additional Pokémon (as of 27 February 2026)	
122	Mr. Mime			373	Salamence			615	Cryogonal									No additional Pokémon (as of 27 February 2026)	
123	Scyther			374	Beldum			616	Shelmet									No additional Pokémon (as of 27 February 2026)	
124	Jynx			375	Metang			617	Accelgor									No additional Pokémon (as of 27 February 2026)	
125	Electabuzz			376	Metagross			618	Stunfisk									No additional Pokémon (as of 27 February 2026)	
126	Magmar			377	Regirock^{L}			619	Mienfoo									No additional Pokémon (as of 27 February 2026)	
127	Pinsir			378	Regice^{L}			620	Mienshao									No additional Pokémon (as of 27 February 2026)	
128	Tauros			379	Registeel^{L}			621	Druddigon									No additional Pokémon (as of 27 February 2026)	
129	Magikarp			380	Latias^{L}			622	Golett									No additional Pokémon (as of 27 February 2026)	
130	Gyarados			381	Latios^{L}			623	Golurk									No additional Pokémon (as of 27 February 2026)	
131	Lapras			382	Kyogre^{L}			624	Pawniard									No additional Pokémon (as of 27 February 2026)	
132	Ditto			383	Groudon^{L}			625	Bisharp									No additional Pokémon (as of 27 February 2026)	
133	Eevee^{S}			384	Rayquaza^{L}			626	Bouffalant									No additional Pokémon (as of 27 February 2026)	
134	Vaporeon			385	Jirachi^{M}			627	Rufflet									No additional Pokémon (as of 27 February 2026)	
135	Jolteon			386	Deoxys^{M}			628	Braviary									No additional Pokémon (as of 27 February 2026)	
136	Flareon							629	Vullaby									No additional Pokémon (as of 27 February 2026)	
137	Porygon							630	Mandibuzz									No additional Pokémon (as of 27 February 2026)	
138	Omanyte^{F}							631	Heatmor									No additional Pokémon (as of 27 February 2026)	
139	Omastar^{F}							632	Durant									No additional Pokémon (as of 27 February 2026)	
140	Kabuto^{F}							633	Deino									No additional Pokémon (as of 27 February 2026)	
141	Kabutops^{F}							634	Zweilous									No additional Pokémon (as of 27 February 2026)	
142	Aerodactyl^{F}							635	Hydreigon									No additional Pokémon (as of 27 February 2026)	
143	Snorlax							636	Larvesta									No additional Pokémon (as of 27 February 2026)	
144	Articuno^{L}							637	Volcarona									No additional Pokémon (as of 27 February 2026)	
145	Zapdos^{L}							638	Cobalion^{L}									No additional Pokémon (as of 27 February 2026)	
146	Moltres^{L}							639	Terrakion^{L}									No additional Pokémon (as of 27 February 2026)	
147	Dratini							640	Virizion^{L}									No additional Pokémon (as of 27 February 2026)	
148	Dragonair							641	Tornadus^{L}									No additional Pokémon (as of 27 February 2026)	
149	Dragonite							642	Thundurus^{L}									No additional Pokémon (as of 27 February 2026)	
150	Mewtwo^{L}							643	Reshiram^{L}									No additional Pokémon (as of 27 February 2026)	
151	Mew^{M}							644	Zekrom^{L}									No additional Pokémon (as of 27 February 2026)	
								645	Landorus^{L}									No additional Pokémon (as of 27 February 2026)	
								646	Kyurem^{L}									No additional Pokémon (as of 27 February 2026)	
								647	Keldeo^{M}									No additional Pokémon (as of 27 February 2026)	
								648	Meloetta^{M}									No additional Pokémon (as of 27 February 2026)	
								649	Genesect^{M}									No additional Pokémon (as of 27 February 2026)	

=== Glitch species ===
In the Game Boy Pokémon games, Pokémon Red, Green, Blue, and Yellow, players were able to access a set of 105 glitch Pokémon. These species were not designed by the games' designers but could be encountered via the use of several glitches. Among them is a glitch dubbed MissingNo., which became highly notorious.
