= Lebanne =

Fictional video game character

- Pokémon character
- Lebanne from Pokémon Legends: Z-A
- First appearance: Pokémon Legends: Z-A (2025)

In-universe information
- Origin: Lumiose City

Lebanne, known as Harujio (Japanese: ハルジオ) in Japan, is a character introduced in Pokémon Legends: Z-A, a 2025 action roleplaying game developed by Game Freak. Initially presented as a mild-mannered maid in the service of socialite Jacinthe, her actual personality is highly aggressive when fighting the player. It is revealed afterward that she was originally a Pokémon Trainer that sought to fight the strongest opponents, but was defeated by Jacinthe. As a result, she was pressed into service as her maid while willingly suppressing her actual personality.

Lebanne has been popular since her debut, seen as both an attractive character and praised for having more depth than typically seen amongst human characters in the Pokémon franchise. Her relationship with Jacinthe has also received some discussion, with some seeing it as off-putting, and others regarding it as both an example of a toxic relationship and yuri within the series.

== Concept and design ==
Developed by Game Freak and published by Nintendo, the Pokémon franchise began in Japan in 1996 with the release of the video games Pokémon Red and Blue for the Game Boy. In these games, the player assumes the role of a Pokémon Trainer whose goal is to capture and train creatures called Pokémon. Players use the creatures' special abilities to combat other Pokémon, both in the wild as well as those used by other Trainers. Created for the 2025 game Pokémon Legends: Z-A, a sequel to Pokémon X and Y, Lebanne is a Trainer that specializes in Dragon-Type Pokémon, and acts as a boss the player must defeat in order to proceed.

Lebanne is a tall, slender woman with pale skin and emphasized eyelashes. She has green hair, with bangs in the front and a long ponytail in the back that extends past her knees, held together by multiple bows along its length. A white headband with pointed corners sits atop her head. The rest of her attire is a maid outfit, consisting of black shoes, white stockings that extend thigh length, a black dress that balloons around the upper thighs and shoulders, with sleeves that extend to the wrists and end in white frills. A black apron sits atop it that features her group's logo on the center, while a matching bowtie holding her Key Stone item covers her neck.

== Appearances ==
Lebanne first appears in Z-A, acting as the maid and personal assistant to Jacinthe, head of the socialite Trainer group "Society of Battle Connoisseurs" within the game. Initially, she will caution the player against angering Jacinthe, but later will be made to confront the player directly in battle. While normally presented as poised and mild-mannered, during the battle she reveals her actual highly aggressive personality. Upon defeat, she tells the player her history: she was originally a Trainer seeking the strongest opponents, but was beaten by Jacinthe two years prior to the events of the game. As a result, she was pressed into servitude as her maid. Despite Lebanne's complaints, she willingly goes along with Jacinthe's demands.

In the Mega Dimensions downloadable content for Z-A, Lebanne appears in one of the game's optional side missions as an opponent the player can battle. If they do, they engage her in a two-person team battle, with Lebanne fighting alongside a hologram of Jacinthe, while the actual Jacinthe assists the player.

== Critical reception ==
Lebanne was well received upon debut. Brent Knopp of Vice felt that her storyline was one of the most disturbing in the franchise, further calling it "creepy" due to how Jacinthe pressed her into service and forces her to suppress her normal personality. Maria Eduarda Cury of IGN on the other hand noticed that fans had taken positively to the duo's dynamic, in particular while both received praise for the designs, Lebanne's sarcastic personality and beauty put her in the spotlight when the discussion turned to attractive trainers in the game. Meanwhile, Kenneth Shepard of Kotaku discussed it in the scope of queercoding in character design and related aesthetics he felt had begun to appear in the series, particularly after the introduction of Fairy-type Pokémon. He felt that Lebanne and Jacinthe were designed to appeal to yuri shippers, particularly fans of toxic relationships as the former is subjected to a daily humiliation ritual by the latter, and observed how fan reactions seem to support this sentiment.

The Gamer's Stacey Henley called her the breakout star of the game. Describing her as a "simpering, overly polite" maid who serves a spoiled socialite, she initially felt the character would rely solely on this particular trope, noting how other characters in Z-A often stuck to one archetype. However, Henley felt her actual personality and seeming fear at displeasing Jacinthe gave her depth beyond that aesthetic, and she further echoed Shepard's commentary about them resembling a toxic yuri relationship with how Lebanne is simultaneously embarrassed but also willing to go along with Jacinthe's behavior, providing Jacinthe some depth as well when they were together onscreen she lacked when alone. Henley added that while Lebanne was a minor character in the overall game, she was an example of how Game Freak could develop deep characters and hoped it was an aspect they would repeat in later games to help the human characters stand out more.

Izuma Wind of Japanese website Inside was surprised by the contrast in her maid personality and her actual one, initially considering her a character portrayed as one that "couldn't stand hardships" only to be proven wrong when she fought, describing her as "in reality sharp as a knife". Examining her design, he noted how her headband appeared to illustrate a set of ears atop her head, while her long tied up hair gave her the image of having an actual tail. He felt her Japanese name Harujio may be a reference to a type of spring aster flower, which is often considered a weed due to it blooming everywhere. He added that in the "love of remembrance" 'language' of flowers, one could observe Lebanne as having become a new self under Jacinthe, while still reminiscing about her old self.
