= Unown =

Pokémon species

- Pokémon character
- "F" Unown artwork by Ken Sugimori
- First game: Pokémon Gold and Silver (1999)
- Designed by: Ken Sugimori

In-universe information
- Species: Pokémon
- Type: Psychic

Unown (/ʌˈnoʊn/; Japanese: アンノーン, Hepburn: Annōn) is a Pokémon species in Nintendo and Game Freak's Pokémon franchise. Created by Ken Sugimori, Unown first appeared in the video games Pokémon Gold and Silver and most of its subsequent sequels. It has also appeared in various merchandise, spin-off titles, and animated and printed adaptations of the franchise. Unown are hieroglyph-like, thin, black ancient Pokémon usually found on walls. There are twenty-eight forms of Unown: one for each of the twenty-six letters in the Latin alphabet, a question mark, and an exclamation mark. Unown is a Psychic-type Pokémon, and is not able to evolve.

Unown was conceived as an alien-like creature, but while designing it, the designers noticed its resemblance to letters in the Latin alphabet, and shifted course. It has received generally negative reception, criticized for being weak, useless, and lacking appeal, though it has been considered an underutilized element in the series. It was used as part of a research paper, where they used Unown in order to teach classification and phylogeny to students.

== Concept and creation ==
Unown is a species of fictional creatures called Pokémon created for the Pokémon media franchise. Developed by Game Freak and published by Nintendo, the Japanese franchise began in 1996 with the video games Pokémon Red and Green for the Game Boy, which were later released in North America as Pokémon Red and Blue in 1998. In these games and their sequels, the player assumes the role of a Trainer whose goal is to capture and use the creatures' special abilities to combat other Pokémon. Each Pokémon has one or two elemental types, which define its advantages and disadvantages when battling other Pokémon. A major goal in each game is to complete the Pokédex, a comprehensive Pokémon encyclopedia, by capturing, evolving, and trading with other Trainers to obtain individuals from all Pokémon species.

Unown was first introduced in Pokémon Gold and Silver. When developing the games, around 300 individual Pokémon designs were drafted by various members of the development team, with each deciding their names and features, revising the drafts as needed. During this process the team actively tried to avoid vague design concepts, as they felt this had caused difficulty in creating completed Pokémon during Red and Blue development. As the team selected which Pokémon would be included, they were drawn and finalized by lead artist Ken Sugimori. To maintain balance, many of the newer species did not appear in the early stages of the game. Additionally, many of the Pokémon were designed with merchandise in mind, taking into account the related Pokémon toy line and anime series. As a result, designs often had to be kept simplistic, something that caused strain for Sugimori and affected his approach to the next Pokémon franchise titles, Pokémon Ruby and Sapphire.

Unown were designed by series artist Ken Sugimori; while some designs in Gold and Silver were cut content from Red and Blue, Unown were new designs. Unown came to Sugimori in a "sudden burst of inspiration," with Sugimori wanting to make something whose design inspiration was not as obvious as others. Sugimori suggested that Unown had a more "surreal design" that could have come from outer space. While they were designed to resemble aliens at first, the designers noticed that they began to look like letters of the alphabet, leading them to lean into this and make twenty-six different forms corresponding to the Latin alphabet. They are hieroglyph-like Psychic-type Pokémon that first appear in Pokémon Gold and Silver. They can be found on walls. Unown gained two more forms beginning with the third-generation remakes Pokémon FireRed and LeafGreen, with the latter two Unown meant to look like a question mark and an exclamation mark. They are among the Pokémon with the most forms. There are also other Unown, which are modeled after Cyrillic script, though these only appeared briefly in Pokémon: Spell of the Unown. Very little information about the species has ever been explained.

== Appearances ==
The Unown alphabet, from A-Z, with the ! and ? Unown at the end, as depicted in Pokémon Legends: Arceus

Unown made their debut appearance in the Pokémon series in Pokémon Gold and Silver, which is set in Johto. In this game, they can be found in the Ruins of Alph and are triggered once the player completes puzzles in the caves found in the Ruins, with a character prompting players to collect all twenty-six variations of Unown. They also appeared in Pokémon Crystal, where a new story connected to Unown was added. There are four puzzles to complete in all before the player can access all forms. They have appeared in most subsequent games, with the two new punctuation forms being introduced in Pokémon FireRed and LeafGreen. Unown reappear in Pokémon Legends: Arceus, with all twenty-eight variants found at different points in the game, with locations indicated to the player by hints written using Unown-based text. They are generally not used in battle due to their low stats and limited move pool.

The original twenty-six forms of Unown based on the letters of the alphabet were added to Pokémon Go alongside numerous other Pokémon from Gold and Silver, however, they are incredibly rare in the wild. They have also appeared in other Pokémon games, such as the Pokémon Mystery Dungeon series. Unown has also appeared in the Super Smash Bros. series. They first appeared in Super Smash Bros. Melee as something that can be summoned with a Poké Ball item to attack enemy player characters, and they also appear as a collectible trophy in Melee and a stat-enhancing Spirit in Super Smash Bros. Ultimate.

In the Pokémon anime, they first appeared as the main antagonists of Pokémon 3: The Movie, existing in their own dimension until brought out by a girl named Molly, who had recently lost her parents. Reading her mind, they make her wishes come true, including creating the Pokémon Entei to be a surrogate father. Molly soon learns that her wishes come with threatening consequences and attempts to stop them, but the Unown are out of control, and Entei sacrifices itself to send them back to their dimension and reverse their transformations. In print media, Unown also appear in the Pokémon Adventures manga, and the different variants have also appeared on cards for the Pokémon Trading Card Game.

== Promotion and reception ==
To promote Pokémon 3: The Movie, a lenticular Unown decoder was included with the VHS and DVD copies of the movie. Meanwhile, to promote Pokémon Crystal, a spelling contest called "Bee a Pokémon Master Speller" was held at the Los Angeles Public Library. Hosted by Ben Stein, participants spelled different Pokémon names using the Unown alphabet, with a prize of a trophy and two thousand US dollars towards their college tuition. All twenty-eight variants of Unown were also released as plushies in Pokémon's Sitting Cuties product line. Other merchandise such as action figures, embroidery, and stamps have been released. Line stickers depicting the twenty-eight forms of Unown were added to the social messaging platform. A Pokémon themed exhibition at the National Crafts Museum featured an exhibit based on the Unown, which was considered a particular highlight.

Unown have received generally negative reception since their appearance in Pokémon Gold and Silver, with IGN writer Kat Bailey identifying it as the worst Pokémon. In another article, Bailey criticized their gimmick as well as their uselessness in combat. Both IGN and Variety felt that it lacked the appeal of other Pokémon species, with IGN calling Unown one of the "most useless Pokémon in existence" due to their weakness and lack of an evolution. The Unown have been cited as a missed opportunity in the series' lore, with the collection element of the species being considered tedious and tiresome. Screen Rant writer Devin Ellis Friend stated this further, feeling like the gimmick behind Unown was one of the series' most pointless. He noted how, aside from their gimmick, they are too weak, saying that their only move, Hidden Power, is "essentially random." In an analysis of the article on 1UP FM, Philip Kollar felt they had appeal with children, and added "another layer" for those trying to complete the Pokédex. The Unown's mysterious nature was highlighted by Mic writer Alex Borkowski, who stated that the Unown were "one of the stranger parts of the Pokémon universe that hasn't been retconned yet and doesn't really offer any sort of explanation [...] It's not much, but it also doesn't have to be." In 2006, research was done on using Unown to teach the biological concepts of classification and phylogeny to students, with the researchers finding the results to be "very encouraging".

The Unown also received minor praise for their appearance in Pokémon 3: The Movie, with the Escapist Magazine describing the Unown as "eerie" stating that "They almost come across as a force of nature, something more powerful than our heroes could imagine." TheGamer writer Stacey Henley stated that the Unown were a narratively interesting idea in the Pokémon franchise that were heavily underutilized. She further stated that while the movie only scratched the surface of the Unown, citing that "Without it, the Unown potential would have been squandered completely, instead of only being mostly squandered as it is right now." The Unown's transformation of reality has been analyzed as a metaphor for the power of words and language.
