= Gholdengo =

Pokémon species

- Pokémon character
- Artwork of Gholdengo
- First game: Pokémon Scarlet and Violet (2022)

In-universe information
- Species: Pokémon
- Type: Ghost and Steel

Gholdengo (/ˈɡoʊldənɡoʊ/), known in Japan as Surfugo (Japanese: サーフゴー, Hepburn: Sāfugō), is a Pokémon species in Nintendo and Game Freak's Pokémon media franchise, and the evolved form of the Pokémon Gimmighoul. First introduced in the video games Pokémon Scarlet and Violet, it has since appeared in multiple games including Pokémon Go and the Pokémon Trading Card Game, as well as in various forms of merchandise.

Classified as a Ghost and Steel-type Pokémon, it evolves from Gimmighoul once the player has collected 999 Gimmighoul coins across the Paldean region of the game. It is a humanoid Pokémon, its body made up entirely of gold coins. It is also capable of creating a surfboard made from gold coins to ride on. Gholdengo has a signature move and signature ability: Make It Rain and Good as Gold, which have both contributed to it being a competitively powerful Pokémon in Scarlet and Violet tournaments.

Gholdengo's physical design received a mixed reception from critics, with many comparing it to different objects and concepts and some questioning whether it deserved to be the 1,000th Pokémon in the Pokédex. However, its competitive design was more well received, with its stats and abilities noted for being some of the best in the series.

== Concept and design ==
Gholdengo is a species of fictional creatures called Pokémon created for the Pokémon media franchise. Developed by Game Freak and published by Nintendo, the Japanese franchise began in 1996 with the video games Pokémon Red and Green for the Game Boy, which were later released in North America as Pokémon Red and Blue in 1998. In these games and their sequels, the player assumes the role of a Trainer whose goal is to capture and use the creatures' special abilities to combat other Pokémon. Some Pokémon can transform into stronger species through a process called evolution via various means, such as exposure to specific items. Each Pokémon has one or two elemental types, which define its advantages and disadvantages when battling other Pokémon. A major goal in each game is to complete the Pokédex, a comprehensive Pokémon encyclopedia, by capturing, evolving, and trading with other Trainers to obtain individuals from all Pokémon species.

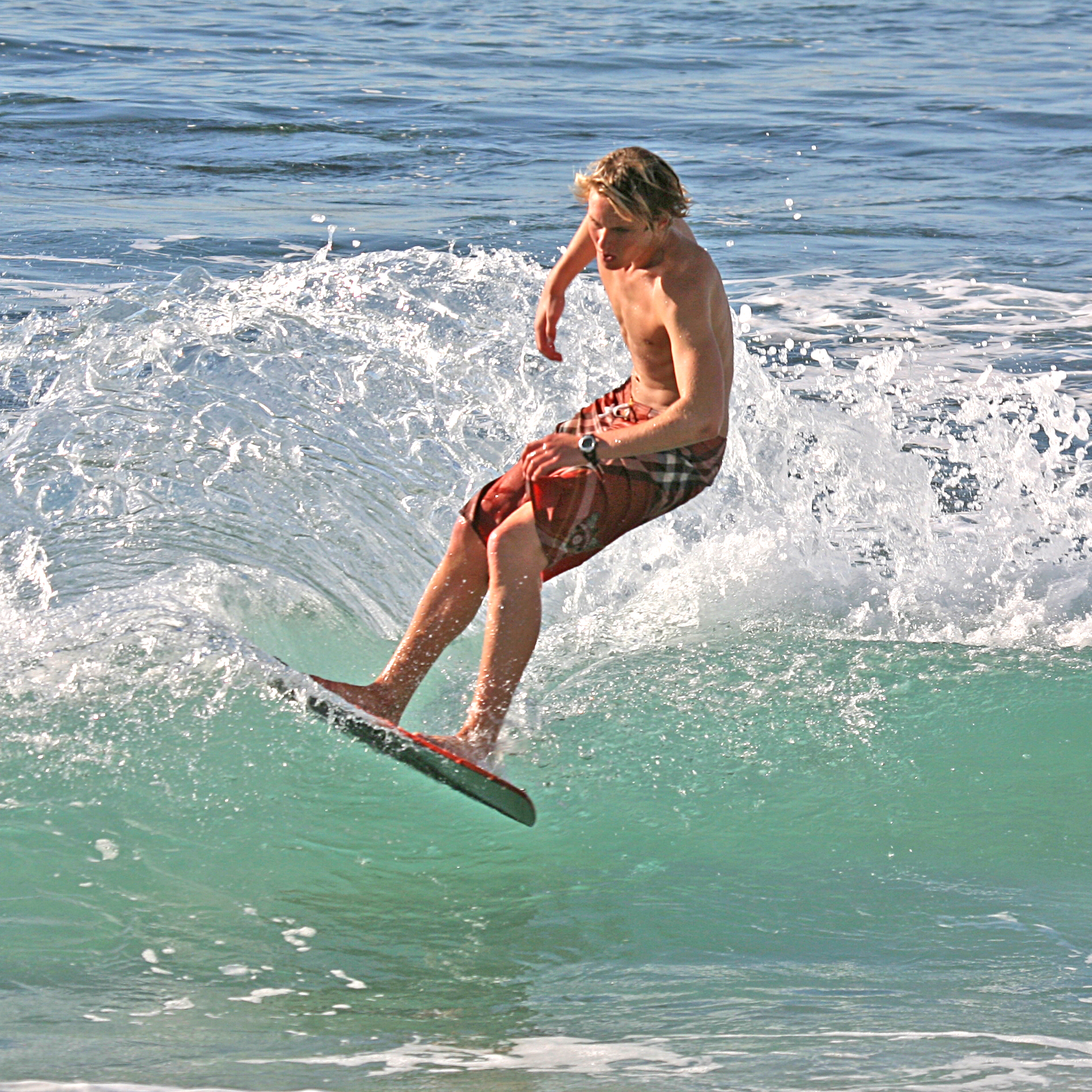
Journalists have noted Gholdengo is likely based on the surfer archetype, listing its surfboard, attitude and hair as evidence of this.

Gholdengo is humanoid in its design. Its body is composed entirely of 1,000 golden coins owned by its pre-evolution Gimmighoul, including its hair. The amount of coins is a reference to Gholdengo being the 1,000th Pokémon. It stands at 3 ft 11 in (1.19 m) and weighs 66.1 pounds (30 kg), with three fingers on each hands and has toeless feet. Around its waist is a belt with a treasure chest and a diamond belt buckle attached to it, with the former being a reference to Gimmighoul. Its body is accented with red lines. In its shiny form, the gold body remains the same, but the accent lines change to silver/blue. Gholdengo is considered to have a cheerful and active attitude, typically depicted with a large smile; it's quick to try and make friends with both people and Pokémon. Gholdengo uses the densely packed coins of which it is composed to move around and as weapons, firing them from any part of its body. When Gholdengo is hit, the coins reduce the impact and therefore damage, although some coins fly off. Gholdengo is also capable of creating a surfboard made of coins to ride; because of this, combined with its attitude and hairstyle, some journalists say Gholdengo is based on the surfer dude archetype.

Gholdengo has a signature ability called "Good as Gold", which makes it immune to status inflicting moves, including Defog and Strength Sap. Additionally, it also has a signature move known as "Make it Rain", a powerful attack at the cost of reducing its Special Attack stat in-battle by one stage per use, changed to two stages in Pokemon Champions. However, it can also increase the amount of money the player earns after battle by five times Gholdengo's level.

Following the release of Scarlet and Violet, Gholdengo was first officially revealed by Pokémon designer James Turner, who created fan art of the species. It was later showcased in a YouTube video covering all 1,008 different species created as of January 2023, in which the video would celebrate Gholdengo as the franchise's official 1,000th Pokémon.

== Appearances ==
Gholdengo first appeared in the 2022 video game Pokémon Scarlet and Violet, which is set in the Paldea region; it is classified as Ghost- and Steel- type Pokémon and obtainable by evolving from Gimmighoul in either its Chest Form or Roaming Form. A limited number of Chest form Gimmighoul can appear near structures such as ruins and watchtowers around Paldea, capturing or defeating them can earn the player between 30 and 777 coins. Alternatively, infinitely respawning Roaming form Gimmighoul also appear around structures such as ruins and Pokémon Centers, in which drop between 1 and 200 coins upon fleeing the player after interacting with them. Evolving Gimmighoul into Gholdengo requires the player to collect 999 Ghimighoul coins. Gimmighoul have also occasionally appeared in Tera Raid events, where they have a chance of being shiny, allowing for players to evolve it into a shiny Gholdengo. It was initially absent from Pokémon Legends: Z-A until the release of the Mega Dimension DLC.

Gholdengo can be seen in other spin-off Pokémon video games, such as Pokémon Café ReMix. Roaming form Gimmighoul and Gholdengo were added to Pokémon Go in February 2023. Players were required to connect their Pokémon Go accounts to their copy of Scarlet or Violet to collect the Coin Bag and Golden Lure Module items, with the latter to be used on PokéStops; for a limited time the Gold Stops give coins as well as can spawn Roaming form Gimmighoul that can drop coins based on throwing accuracy, 999 coins are needed in order to evolve one into Gholdengo. This mechanic was designed for groups of players during in-game events to place many Golden PokéStops to rack up coins quickly. During Go's 9th anniversary event in July 2025, Golden PokéStops could appear naturally for a brief time; however, due to a visual bug the PokéStops did not appear golden, confusing players and prompting Niantic, Inc. to acknowledge the issue and work on a fix. In September 2024, Gholdengo was added to Pokémon Masters EX alongside the character Lear during an event where the player can earn 1,000 diamonds, the in-game currency. Gholdengo has been featured on a variety of cards within the Pokémon Trading Card Game, including the sets Paradox Rift, Paldean Fates and Raging Surf; one of the card designs in the latter set was designed by veteran Pokémon card design Akira Komayama. Some cards, as well as a Gholdengo emblem, would later feature in the mobile game Pokémon Trading Card Game Pocket.

Gholdengo has made an appearance in Pokémon: The Series, debuting in the 105th episode of Pokémon Horizons: The Series in which protagonist Liko and her friends encounter one at the beach whilst it's surfing. In the same episode, supporting character Dot catches a Gimmighoul; it later evolves into a Gholdengo in the 120th episode.

== Promotion and reception ==
Gholdengo has been featured on a number of merchandise, such as a piggy bank, wallet, chocolate coin tin, card sleeves, item stand, as a variety of figurines, and other forms of stationary and equipment. Gholdengo was featured heavily in a 2024 collaboration between Pokémon and Japanese dairy company Akagi Nyugyo Company Limited [ja] (赤城乳業), in which it was used to promote a pineapple-flavored ice cream product. As part of the promotional campaign, participants could enter to win beach merchandise, specifically beach bags, flip flops, swim rings and beach balls, plastered with a Gholdengo and a Pikachu surfing. In September 2026, The Pokémon Company would be producing gold statues of Gholdengo for a special collaboration with the Japanese jeweller SGC for that year's Great Golden Exhibition, which was held at the Takashimaya Building in Yokohama between September 30 to October 5. One of the statues, measuring 2.36 inches (6.0 cm) in height and 15 grams (0.53 oz) in weight, was made with solid 24-karat gold and worth ¥1,540,000 (US$9,727.38). Another statue of Gholdengo was made with 730 sheets of gold leaf designed to be life-sized (around 47.2 inches (120 cm) tall). The latter statue was one of a pair of life-sized Pokémon statues for the collaboration, with Pikachu being the other statue.

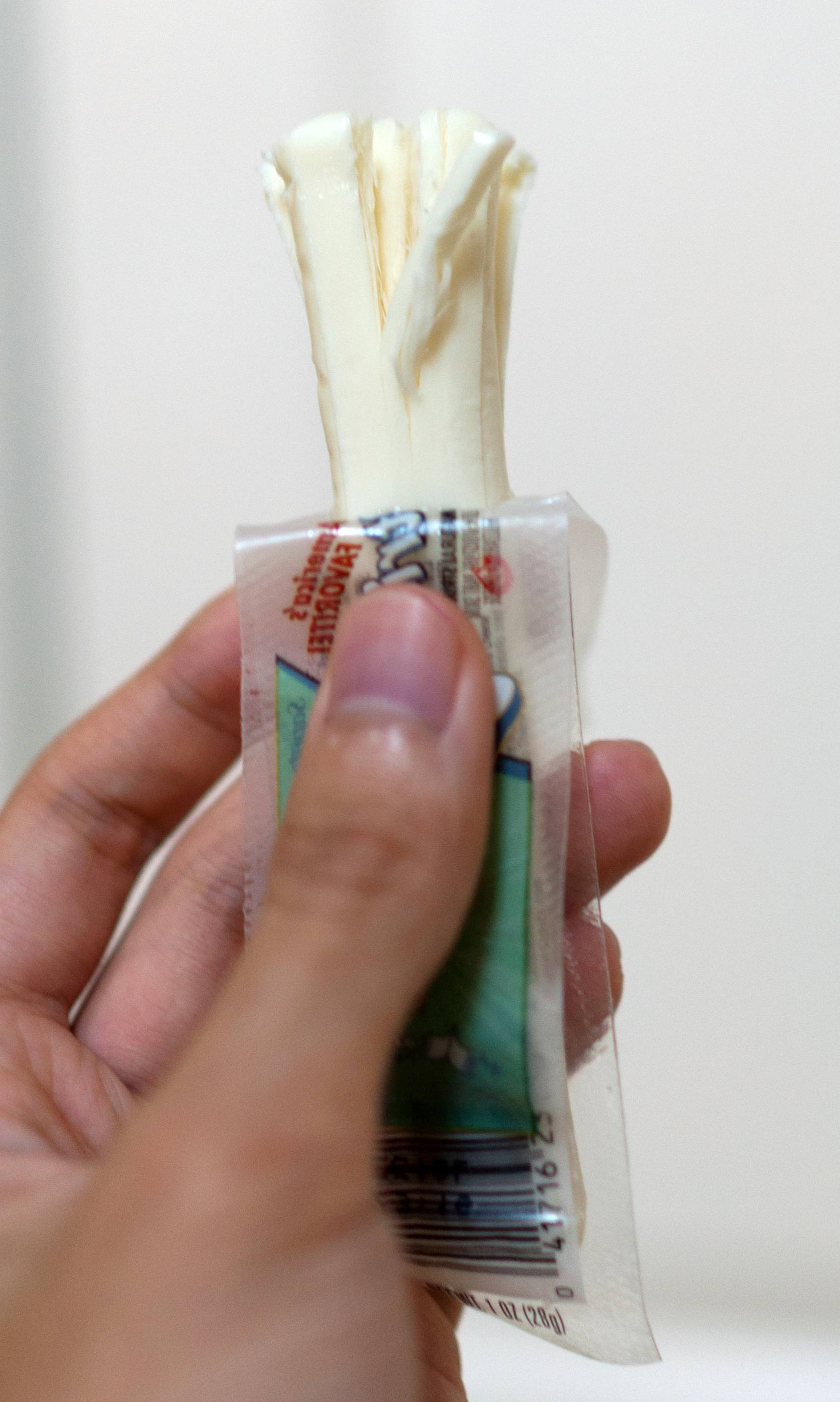
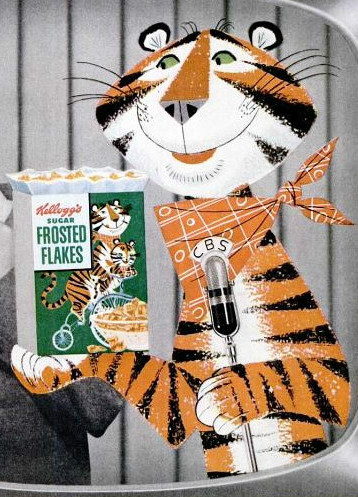
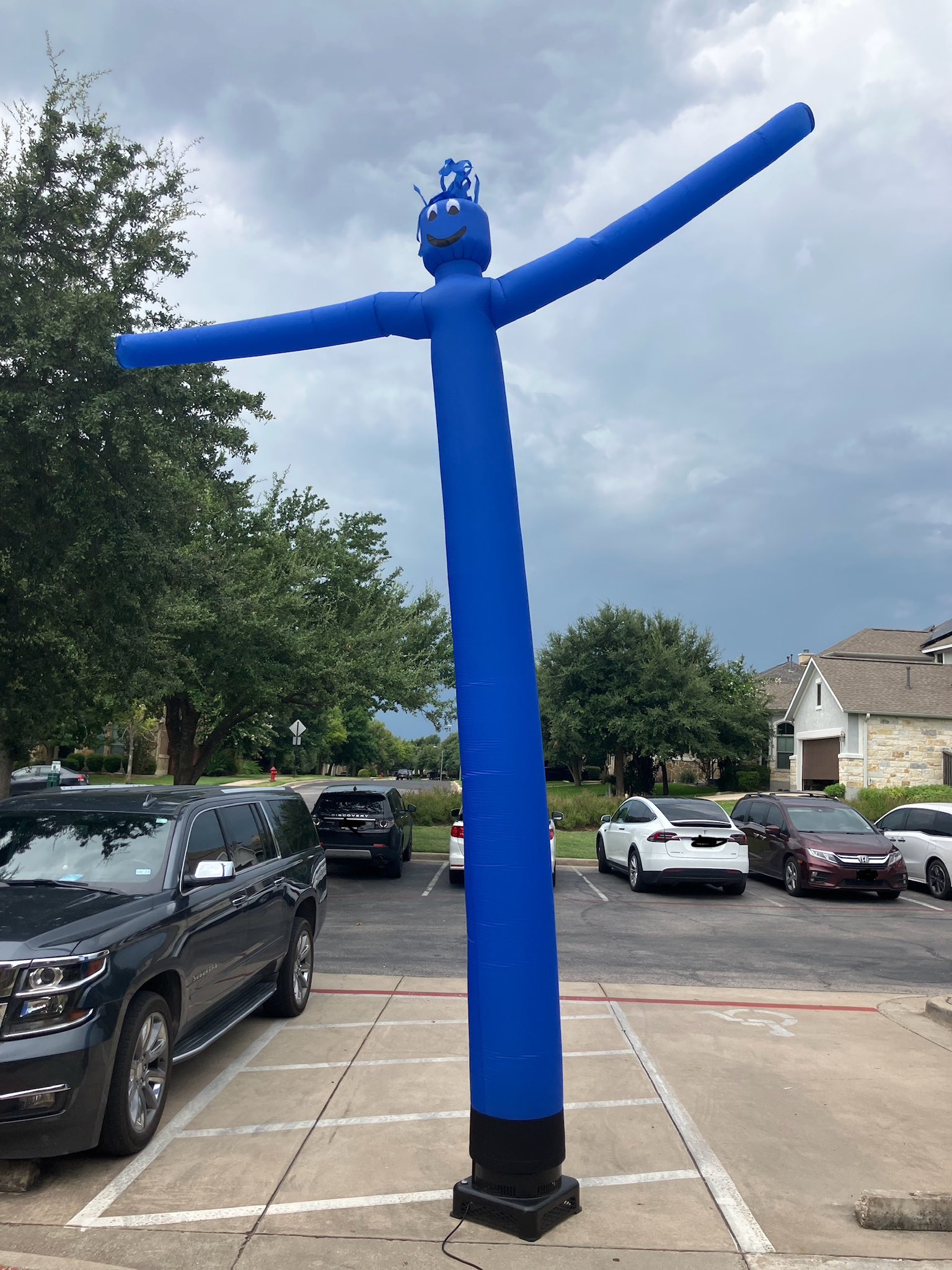
Critics have compared Gholdengo's design to a variety of objects and characters, including string cheese (left), cereal mascots (middle) and skydancers (right).

Views on Gholdengo's design was mixed, with many comparing the design to string cheese. Ethan Gach of Kotaku compared the design to a cereal mascot by General Mills as well as cryptocurrency, joking that it looked like a "walking Ponzi scheme". Gach believed the design to be a testament to the Pokémon's durability as a series as being "too big to fail", noting that despite Scarlet and Violet's performance issues, it was still a major commercial success; Gach furthered the comparison by rhetorically asking if it mattered if the series' 1,000th Pokémon design looked "like it just got back from making DeFi TikToks at Burning Man?" Writing for Pocket Tactics, Nathan Ellingsworth similarly derided Gholdengo as wasted potential and an "anthropomorphic nightmare", negatively comparing the design as a "Mr. Men version of the Silver Surfer but drawn by a toddler" and as if "the cheesestring man met the same 'golden crown' fate as Viserys Targaryen." Continuing, Ellingsworth remained hopeful that the 2,000th Pokémon had a better design. USA Today writers Cian Maher and Ryan Woodrow regarded it as one of the worst Pokémon designs, bemoaning how disappointing it was considering how much work was involved in obtaining it. They acknowledged that it made sense for it to be all gold, it made it look bad, criticizing it for looking like a "failed 90s sneaker brand" mascot. In another article, Woodrow believed that Gimmighoul itself was a great Pokémon, expressing disappointment with what it evolved into.

Conversely, GamePro Germany's David Molke found Gholdengo to be adorable, ascribing the design to skydancers used for advertisements in places such as car dealerships. TheGamer editor George Foster was initially confused by the design, describing it as one of the strangest Pokémon as he thought it was a gold spray-painted tree with googly eyes, also similarly comparing it to string cheese. However, Foster became more accepting of the design as he noted that it had a rad energy and was a "pretty chill dude", adding that he would add it to his team "based purely on vibes." In an article for IGN, Rebekah Valentine lauded the design a fun choice for the 1000th Pokémon spot, describing as a "fascinating little dude" despite looking like a cereal mascot. Valentine praised it Pokédex entry and cover, noting the former was "a testament to this amazing little guy being beloved by Game Freak." Retro Dodo's Anthony Wallace stated that its cool design and formidable competitive abilities made it "a truly great one" for the 1,000th design milestone, reminiscing how far the series had come since 1996; Wallace was admittedly disappointed that despite it being able to use a surfboard, Gholdengo was unable to learn the move Surf. Whilst noting Gimmighoul's design origins had more direct Spanish roots inline with Paldea's Iberian influences, such as Spanish conquistadors pillaging for riches and the coin-carrying Spanish folklore protagonist Patufet, Prima Games writer Daphne Fama attributed Gholdengo's design as being inspired by cowboys from Hollywood Spaghetti western films due to its belt being slung to the side, mentioning that many such films were filmed in Spain. Fama also acknowledged that its "Good as Gold" ability may have been inspired by a 1927 silent film of the same name.

Gholdengo gained particular attention for its strength in competitive play, with the species at one point being the most used Pokémon in Scarlet and Violet's competitive scene. Gholdengo received dominant use during those games' first Video Game Championship (VGC) series, with many using Gholdengo on their teams to win tournaments. Following the beginning of the second series of VGC, Gholdengo saw a significant drop in competitive use; Game Rant's Drew Swanson speculated this was due to setups for Gholdengo becoming more predictable and easier to counter as well as the introduction of Paradox Pokémon. Swanson stated that it was still a frequent presence in competitive play. Yash Nair of Dot Esport wrote that he believed Gholdengo to be one of if not the strongest Pokémon in Scarlet and Violet's metagame, with Wallace and Prima Games highlighting its Ghost- and Steel-typing for making it immune to most types of Pokémon attacks. Its signature ability "Good as Gold" was identified by multiple critics as a particularly strong ability, attributing Gholdengo's competitive success in part to the strength of this ability. Pocket Tactics writer Kayleigh Partleton believed that the ability gave Gholdengo the best defenses for a Pokémon in the franchise. Timothy Monbleau of Destructoid noted that a combination of its signature ability and move allow players to use Gholdengo to efficiently earn in-game currency, adding that as well as its other competitive abilities, it made Gholdengo "a formidable monster to don the crown of Pokemon #1000." TheGamer writer Ben Sledge analyzed how deserving Gholdengo was of the 1000th spot in the Pokédex, commenting that his design left something to be desired and resembled string cheese. He noted that it was a powerful Pokémon, expressing little surprise that it was so successful in competitive play. Despite this, he argued that the 1000th spot should have been reserved for a mascot or legendary Pokémon. Sledge believed that Gholdengo represented the modern-day Pokémon series, stating that a Pokémon made out of money represented the people in charge of the series allowing games to release with bugs due to how well they sell.
