= Dracozolt, Arctozolt, Dracovish, and Arctovish =

Pokémon species

- Pokémon characters
- Group artwork of the Pokémon by Hitoshi Ariga. From top left to bottom right: Arctovish, Arctozolt, Dracovish, Dracozolt
- First appearance: Pokémon Sword and Shield (2019)
- Designed by: Hitoshi Ariga
- Voiced by: Dawn M. Bennett (Arctozolt), Pokémon: Twilight Wings Kellen Goff (Arctozolt), Pokémon (TV series) Kenyu Horiuchi (Dracovish, Japanese) Pokémon (TV series)

In-universe information
- Type: List: Water and Ice (Arctovish); Electric and Ice (Arctozolt); Water and Dragon (Dracovish); Electric and Dragon (Dracozolt)

Arctovish (/ˈɑːrktəvɪʃ/), Arctozolt (/ˈɑːrktəzɔːlt/), Dracovish (/ˈdrækəvɪʃ/), and Dracozolt (/ˈdrækəzɔːlt/)—known as Uochilldon (Japanese: ウオチルドン, Hepburn: Uochirudon), Patchilldon (パッチルドン, Patchirudon), Uonoragon (ウオノラゴン), and Patchiragon (パッチラゴン) in Japan, respectively—are a quartet of Pokémon species who first appeared in Pokémon Sword and Shield. They are considered some of the series' "Fossil Pokémon", species that are brought back to life through fossils. Unlike other fossil Pokémon, the quartet are composed of pairs of parts haphazardly put together, appearing to be inspired by the Crystal Palace Dinosaurs as well as similarly inaccurate reconstructions of dinosaurs.

The four have received a mixed response since their debut, with many citing their designs and lack of realism, though they have also been noted as being more interesting fossil Pokémon than past species. The Pokémon, most particularly Dracovish, have gone on to make an impact in the series' competitive scene.

== Design and characteristics ==
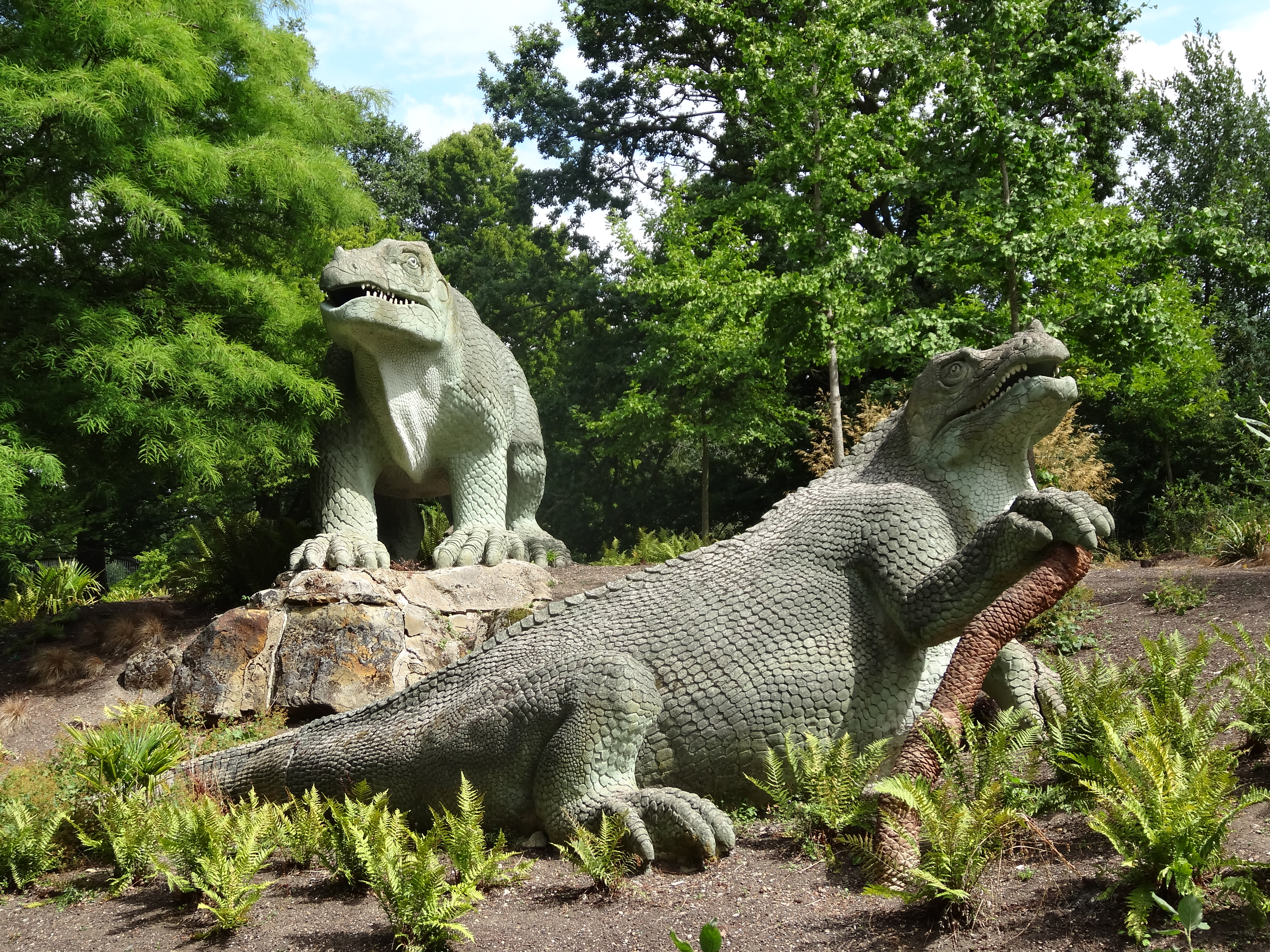
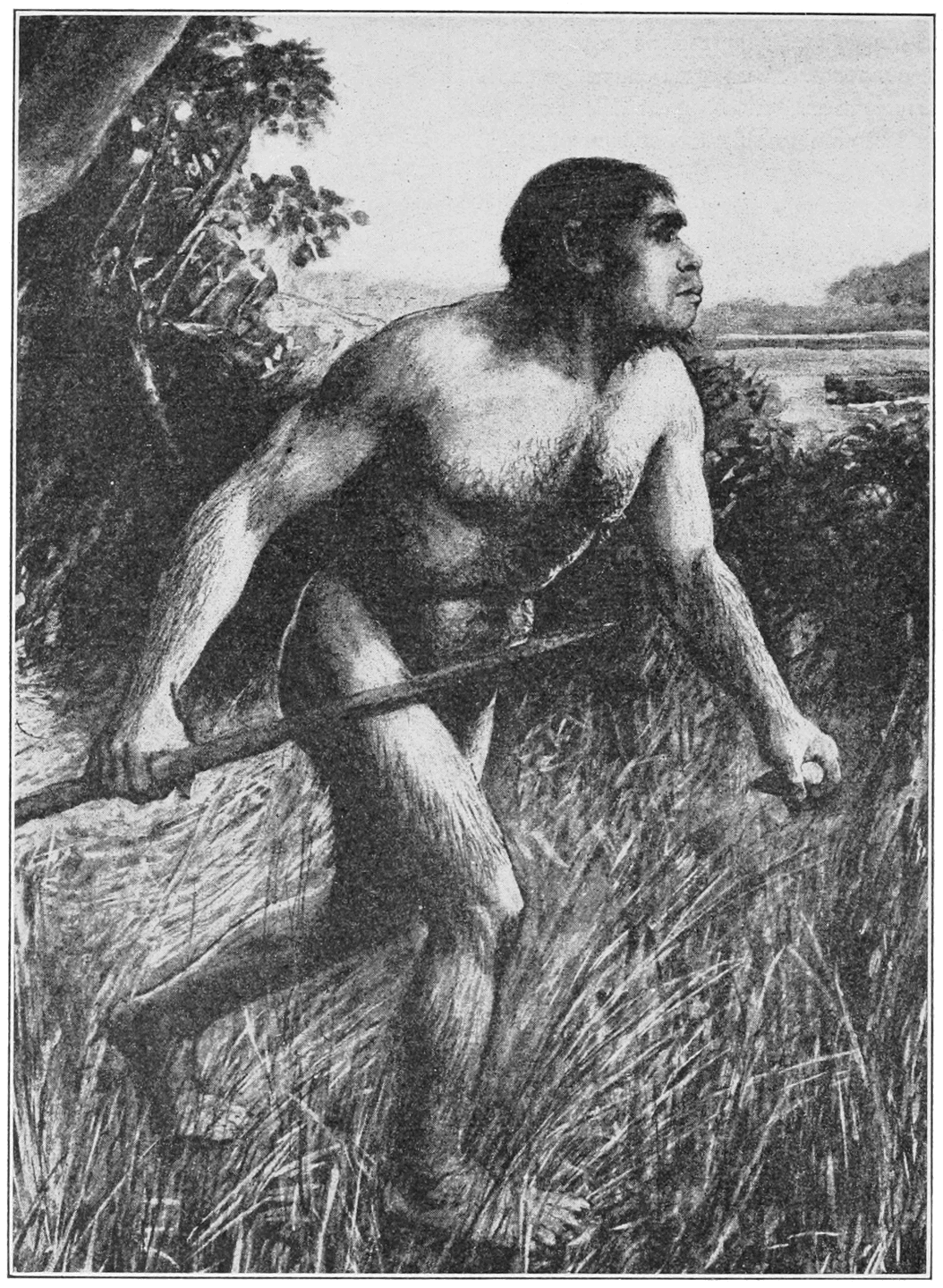
Forgeries and inaccurate reconstructions, such as the Crystal Palace Dinosaurs (left) and Piltdown Man were often considered potential origins for the four.

Arctovish, Arctozolt, Dracovish, and Dracozolt are a quartet of species of fictional creatures called Pokémon created for the Pokémon media franchise. Developed by Game Freak and published by Nintendo, the Japanese franchise began in 1996 with the video games Pokémon Red and Green for the Game Boy, which were later released in North America as Pokémon Red and Blue in 1998. In these games and their sequels, the player assumes the role of a Trainer whose goal is to capture and use the creatures' special abilities to combat other Pokémon. Each Pokémon has one or two elemental types, which define its advantages and disadvantages when battling other Pokémon. A major goal in each game is to complete the Pokédex, a comprehensive Pokémon encyclopedia, by capturing, evolving, and trading with other Trainers to obtain individuals from all Pokémon species.

The quartet are Fossil Pokémon, a subset of Pokémon revived from fossils. The four are revived from different fossils: the Fossilized Drake, Fossilized Bird, Fossilized Fish, and Fossilized Dino, two of which are merged together to create one of the Pokémon. Arctovish can be made out of the Fish and Dino, Arctozolt can be made out of the Bird and Dino, Dracovish can be made out of the Fish and Drake, and Dracozolt can be made out of the Bird and Drake. The various Fossils appear to be based on different types of dinosaurs, such as the stegosaurus, paravians, and dunkleosteus. Their fused nature appears to be based on inaccurate reconstructions of dinosaurs, such as the Crystal Palace Dinosaurs, while other aspects of the creatures appear to be based on hoaxes and paleontological forgeries such as Charles Dawson's Piltdown Man.

The Pokémon, due to their hybrid nature, are not naturally occurring species, but are presented as such by the game's Pokedex. Dracovish are fast runners and brutally efficient at capturing prey, but struggle to breathe on land. Arctozolt are constantly shivering, which allows them to generate electricity, and are capable of preserving food with the ice on their body. Arctovish have incredibly strong, protective skin on their heads, but their heads are upside down, causing them to have difficulties eating prey they capture. Dracozolt are said to have running abilities, similarly to Dracovish, but are too effective in their "natural" environment as a result. The four have two signature moves, only learnable by them. The move Bolt Beak, an Electric-type attack, can be used by Arctozolt and Dracozolt, while the move Fishious Rend, a Water-type attack, can be used by Arctovish and Dracovish. Arctozolt has been voiced by Dawn M. Bennett in Pokémon: Twilight Wings and Kellen Goff in the anime, while Dracovish has been voiced by Kenyu Horiuchi in the anime in Japanese.

== Appearances ==
The four first appeared in Pokémon Sword and Shield, where they can be revived from fossils by a non-player character named Cara Liss. Dracovish and Arctozolt later appeared in the Pokémon anime, where they were revived by Cara Liss. The character Goh captured Arctozolt, while series protagonist Ash Ketchum captured Dracovish, using it throughout the series. A Dracovish based on Ash's was later distributed via the game's "Mystery Gift" mechanic as part of a limited time event.

== Reception ==
The quartet have been met with a mixed response since their inception into the franchise. Negativity was primarily drawn towards their designs, which were frequently equated to Frankenstein's monster, and which were considered unrealistic in nature. Screen Rant writer Camden Jones disliked the lack of naturality in their designs, and despite citing the ideas behind the Fossil Pokémon as good ones, criticized their execution, stating that they were "among the Pokémon series' worst designs ever, looking more like Digimon or Pokémon fusion fan art than actual, official creatures." Patricia Hernandez, writing for Polygon, also agreed with the sentiment. She criticized the lack of realism in their appearances, and further criticized how the group's in-game Pokedex entries ignored the Frankenstein-esque aspects, instead pretending they were real creatures. The Journal of Geek Studies author Rodrigo B. Salvador also criticized their designs, stating that "I find it difficult to decide whether this was just some game developers running wild during character creation brainstorming sessions or if said developers knew enough about Paleontology to make a bold statement against the mistakes and the forgeries that pop up in this field every now and then... Given other biological nonsense in the series, I am more inclined towards the first hypothesis."

Other critics, however, were more positive. Ben Sledge, writing for TheGamer, stated that, despite the lack of realism in the fossils, he couldn't "help but love them." He argued that despite the flaws of the designs, the four Pokémon, unlike past Fossil Pokémon, told a story with their designs, stating that it was "a story that you don't need to read the Pokedex to understand, a story that screams at your eyeballs the moment you first bring a Galarian fossil to unnatural life. In every other Pokemon game, you're restoring a lost creature... In Pokemon Sword & Shield, however, you're creating new life. You have too much power in your hands and you feel a visceral hatred for your creation." Jason Mecchi of Screen Rant cited similar sentiments, particularly around Dracovish, stating that "despite its monstrous appearance, the way it expresses itself over the excitement of curry and toys in the camp feature of Pokémon Sword and Pokémon Shield makes it endearing... it's hard not to look past its Frankenstein qualities and see something innocent and playful." The designs of the fossils have also been used as a subject of comparison to similar mistakes and forgeries in the real-world paleontology field, and Cara Liss's creation of them has been likened to Dawson and the Piltdown Man. Her creation of the fossils and their false Pokedex entries have also been compared to modern day misinformation tactics.

The Pokémon have gone on to make an impact in the game's competitive scene. While Arctovish is generally considered unviable, Arctozolt and Dracozolt see frequent usage in the game's competitive singles tier. Dracovish was seen as a particularly strong Pokémon, notably due to its Fishious Rend attack. Dracovish's power was noted by many, and it was eventually banned from standard play and ranked in the "Ubers" tier of the competitive singles format as a result. A Dracovish plush was later released, which could come with various items based on those prominently used by Dracovish in the game's competitive scene.
