= Pokémon Legends: Z-A =

2025 video game

- Icon art
- Developer: Game Freak
- Publishers: JP: The Pokémon Company; WW: Nintendo
- Directors: Shigeru Ohmori; Haruka Tochigi
- Producers: Katsuhiko Ichiraku; Akira Kinashi; Shinya Saito; Toyokazu Nonaka; Takanori Sowa; Kenji Endo; Keita Imamura (Note: Mega Dimension only)
- Designer: Rei Murayama
- Programmers: Jun Ito; Kazuki Saita
- Artists: Yosuke Uematsu; Satoshi Baba; Suguru Nakatsui
- Writer: Toshinobu Matsumiya
- Composers: Junichi Masuda; Shota Kageyama (Note: Masuda and Kageyama were the game's lead composers, with other contributions from: Hiromitsu Maeba; Minako Adachi; Hitomi Sato; Shinji Hosoe; Ayako Saso; Takahiro Eguchi; Hitoshi Okamoto; Morikazu Aoki; Rei Murayama; Teruo Taniguchi (Mega Dimension only); Takahiro Eguchi (Mega Dimension only); Carlos Eiene (credited as a composer in-game, but only as an arranger in the soundtrack credits and on his own website))
- Series: Pokémon
- Platforms: Nintendo Switch; Nintendo Switch 2
- Release: WW: October 16, 2025
- Genre: Action role-playing
- Modes: Single-player, multiplayer

Pokémon Legends: Z-A (Note: Japanese: Pokémon LEGENDS(ポケモンレジェンズ) Z-A(ゼットエー), Hepburn: Pokémon Rejenzu: Zetto Ē) is a 2025 action role-playing game developed by Game Freak and published by Nintendo and The Pokémon Company for the Nintendo Switch and Nintendo Switch 2. Part of the ninth generation of Pokémon video games, it is a sequel to the sixth-generation titles Pokémon X and Y (2013) and the second entry in the Pokémon Legends sub-series, following Pokémon Legends: Arceus (2022). The game takes place entirely in the Kalos region's Lumiose City, five years after the events of X and Y.

Pokémon Legends: Z-A was announced in February 2024 as an exclusive to the original Switch console, before it was later announced that it would also receive an enhanced port for the Switch 2. It was released on October 16, 2025, to generally positive reviews. Critics praised the battle system, but found the city setting to be visually restricting. Paid downloadable content, Pokémon Legends: Z-A – Mega Dimension, was announced on September 12, 2025, and was released on December 10, 2025. It has sold 13 million copies as of June 2026.

== Gameplay ==
As opposed to previous Pokémon games which featured turn-based combat, Legends: Z-A uses a real-time combat system that takes into account the positioning of the player character, their Pokémon, and the timing of used moves, and allows Pokémon to move around and dodge attacks while in a battle. During Pokémon battles, the player can collect Mega Energy in order to temporarily Mega Evolve their current Pokémon. At night, the player can compete in a competition called the Z-A Royale by entering a Battle Zone. In Battle Zones, the player can launch pre-emptive strikes on opposing trainers that wander around, while opposing trainers are capable of the same technique and can stun the player's Pokémon for a few seconds.

=== Connectivity ===
The game also has a multiplayer mode called the Battle Club, where up to 4 players can participate in Link Battles to defeat the most Pokémon in a given time period, or Ranked Battles, where players battle each other directly for rank points and earn exclusive Mega Stones upon reaching certain ranks. Character customization also returns with improved options.

The game also supports the Pokémon Home online cloud storage app, allowing transfers of supported Pokémon from the Nintendo 3DS app Pokémon Bank, as well as the games Pokémon Go, Pokémon: Let's Go, Pikachu! and Let's Go, Eevee!, Pokémon Sword and Shield, Pokémon Brilliant Diamond and Shining Pearl, Pokémon Legends: Arceus, and Pokémon Scarlet and Violet. Unlike the latter four games that support two-way transferring with each other, all supported Pokémon transferred to Legends: Z-A cannot be returned to those games; likewise, all Pokémon obtained in Legends: Z-A cannot be transferred to older titles, allowing only usage in Pokémon Champions in addition to Legends: Z-A and transferring to future games in the series.

== Plot ==
=== Setting ===
The game takes place in the Kalos region, which was first introduced in the 2013 video games Pokémon X and Y. The plot takes place five years after those games' events, during an urban redevelopment project in Lumiose City, based on Paris, being undertaken by a company called Quasartico, Inc. The game takes place entirely within Lumiose City, where Pokémon coexist with humans in locations known as Wild Zones. During nighttime hours, Battle Zones appear for the Z-A Royale, where trainers wander and can challenge and be challenged by the player to Pokémon battles. The player character's goal is to advance from Rank Z to Rank A via promotion battles with certain trainers to have a wish granted. During the course of the story, the Legendary Pokémon Zygarde takes an interest in the player character, as they take down Rogue Mega Pokemon, a new, mysterious phenomenon within Lumiose City where wild Pokémon spontaneously Mega Evolve and go berserk. One of the player character's goals is to subdue these Rogue Mega Evolved Pokémon in the form of real-time boss battles similar to the Noble Pokémon battles within the prior title, Pokémon Legends: Arceus.

=== Story ===
Lumiose City is in the midst of an urban redevelopment project led by Quasartico Inc. to restore the city's condition after an incident involving Team Flare five years prior, creating "wild zones" where Pokémon live in the city. The player character arrives as a tourist to Lumiose City, and befriends either Taunie or Urbain (if the player selected a male or female character, respectively), who gives the player their starter Pokémon and brings them to Hotel Z, which is owned by the 3,000-year-old AZ and his Floette. The player then joins the citywide Z-A Royale tournament, where participants compete to rise from the lowest Rank Z to the highest Rank A, with those reaching Rank A being granted a wish by Quasartico. At Taunie/Urbain's request, the player also joins Team MZ, a small group of trainers based out of Hotel Z.

As the player easily defeats trainers in the lower ranks, they attract the attention of Quasartico and its CEO Jett, who recruits the player to handle "Rogue Mega Evolution", a recent phenomenon in Lumiose City that causes wild Pokémon to Mega Evolve on their own. The player's rank is raised to Rank F, and they defeat multiple Rogue Mega Evolved Pokémon with Team MZ's help as they continue to progress in the Z-A Royale. In doing so, the player attracts the attention of Zygarde, a Legendary Pokémon, as well as a man known as "L" – later revealed to be former Team Flare leader Lysandre, who had survived the destruction of the ultimate weapon due to Zygarde's intervention, but lost his memory and was cursed with the same longevity afflicting AZ.

The player must make additional effort before battling certain opponents in the Z-A Royale, such as competing in a trivia competition in order to battle video game livestreamer Canari, helping the trainer Ivor find his sister who was hiding in the sewers, helping people throughout Lumiose City as payment after Taunie/Urbain goes into debt with the Rust Syndicate gang when Taunie/Urbain takes a loan from their leader, Corbeau, and being forced to participate in a Pokémon battling tournament by the socialite Jacinthe.

Prior to reaching Rank A, the player investigates Team Flare, and learns from AZ and Lysandre that a device called "Ange" within the Prism Tower building has been emitting Mega Energy, causing the Rogue Mega Evolutions. The player also learns that AZ was responsible for the construction of Ange, which was originally constructed to share the longevity he and AZ’s Floette received with the region in act of atonement for building the Ultimate Weapon. The device was left dormant when the region entered an era of peace, but it was activated by Team Flare's actions in Pokémon X and Y and its energy threatens to run wild and destroy the city. The only way to deactivate the device is to harness the power of AZ'S Floette Mega Form, which was why AZ and Quasartico created the Z-A Royale to determine the strongest trainer capable of commanding Floette.

Ange is activated one night, leading Team MZ to the tower. AZ's Floette and Taunie/Urbain attempt to shut off the device, but it malfunctions and transforms the tower into a gigantic monster threatening to destroy the city. With help from the trainers the player met in the Z-A Royale, the player reaches Zygarde in the debris, and they defeat the monster by Mega Evolving Zygarde and destroying the device. AZ watches from Hotel Z as Ange is destroyed, before dying shortly after from reaching the end of his extended lifespan. After Ange's destruction and AZ's burial, Taunie/Urbain and the player agree to use their wishes from the Z-A Royale to restart the competition as the Infinite Z-A Royale.

=== Mega Dimension ===
With the Prism Tower crisis averted, a young girl named Ansha visits Hotel Z with her companion, the Mythical Pokémon Hoopa. Team MZ helps Ansha bake a donut that strengthens Hoopa, and she tells them that she wishes to capture a certain Legendary Pokémon for her mother. Ansha then has Hoopa open a portal to an alternate dimension called Hyperspace Lumiose, and Team MZ follows her inside. Upon their return, a distortion has appeared above Prism Tower, and Corbeau, leader of the Rust Syndicate, asks Team MZ to investigate Hyperspace Lumiose.

Later, Ansha and AZ's friend, Korrina join Team MZ. Team MZ completes research within Hyperspace Lumiose, as well as subdues many new Rouge Mega Evolved Pokemon, and they eventually learn that Hyperspace Lumiose was created by Darkrai, a Mythical Pokémon within the distortion above Prism Tower who had suffered from excess Mega Power exposure. With aid from other trainers in the Z-A Royale, the player, Korrina, and Taunie/Urbain enter the distortion. After encountering a dream-like manifestation of AZ and saying their goodbyes, they battle Darkrai, which undergoes Rogue Mega Evolution. The player captures Darkrai, stabilizing Hyperspace Lumiose.

The next day, Corbeau identifies the Legendary Pokémon Ansha has been pursuing as Rayquaza, and tasks Team MZ with capturing the Hoennian Legendary Pokémon Groudon and Kyogre. After the player does so, Team MZ learns that Hyperspace Lumiose will make Rayquaza's dimension appear if Ansha makes a strong wish. Ansha hears about Groudon and Kyogre, and she remembers the stories her mother told her about Rayquaza. Her wish resonates with Hyperspace Lumiose, allowing Team MZ to confront Rayquaza. Rayquaza undergoes Rogue Mega Evolution during the battle, but the player captures it. The player presents Rayquaza to Ansha, who declines taking it from them and decides to tell her mother about her adventures as well as staying in Lumiose with Team MZ.

== Development and release ==
On February 27, 2024, Legends Z-A was announced during a Pokémon Presents presentation with a release window of '2025'. At the end of the trailer, the Mega Evolution mechanic, which was first introduced in X and Y, was also confirmed to return. During the next Pokémon Presents, on February 27, 2025, a second video was released, giving more information on the plot and gameplay elements with an updated release window of 'late 2025'. During the Nintendo Direct on April 2, 2025, it was confirmed that Pokémon Legends: Z-A would get an upgraded version on Nintendo Switch 2 alongside many other Nintendo Switch games. The game was released on October 16, 2025, for both Switch and Switch 2. Z-A was showcased again during a September 2025 Nintendo Direct, during which Mega Evolved forms for the X and Y starters were revealed. These forms were stated to be unlocked from the game's online ranked battles, with the Mega Stones for these forms split between three seasons. Alongside the base game reveals, a paid DLC was also announced: Pokémon Legends: Z-A – Mega Dimension. The DLC is centered around the Mythical Pokémon Hoopa and features the debut of two Mega forms of Raichu, alongside other new Mega Evolutions. The DLC was released on December 10, 2025.

A demo of the game was made available for attendees of the 2025 Pokémon World Championships at the Anaheim Convention Center in Anaheim, California.

On October 29, 2026, the soundtrack of the base game was added to Nintendo Music.

=== Leaks ===
Legends: Z-A was subjected to a number of leaks related to in-game information prior to its release. A prominent leak related to a list of the game's Mega Pokémon months prior to their official reveals. In early October, certain Pokémon were leaked to be returning in Z-A. A week prior to Z-A's official release, some people were able to obtain early copies of the game. The game's ROM was leaked onto illegal ROM sites, with some players streaming the game on Twitch. These copies would be datamined in order to leak information about the game online ahead of its release; these leaks primarily pertained to showcasing the designs of the new Mega Pokémon, such as Mega Starmie, as well as the game's full Pokedex and item lists.

In August 2024, about 1TB of information was stolen from Game Freak's servers containing older builds of games, concept art and documentation of various games as well as 2,600 pieces of employee data. Among the information obtained from the hack was source code of Legends: Z-A in addition to titles planned to release after. On October 12, 2024, most of the information was posted on a Discord server, which would spread to other social media platforms and forums, with the community dubbing it as the Teraleak. However, the hacker who was behind the leak held back on releasing information regarding Z-A and future projects in the Pokémon franchise until Z-A was launched. In April 2025, Nintendo filed for a subpoena in the U.S. District Court for the Northern District of California against Discord for personal information regarding the Discord user GameFreakOut, who is claimed to be the leaker. In the week leading up to Legends: Z-A's release, as well as being one year on from the Teraleak, a continuation of the leak occurred in which around 70GB of information regarding the series was released online. The second round of the Teraleak, dubbed the Freakleak by GamesRadar+, contained source code and in-development beta builds of Z-A (2 builds for PC and 3 builds for the Switch), featuring minigames and mechanics that would become scrapped in the final version; early features that were scrapped include the ability to ride Pokémon, third-person shooting mechanics and abilities related to parkour. Another aspect of the beta builds showcased that in-door windows and balconies had more detail due to being modelled. Around 10GB of the leak pertained to documentation of the game's development, as well as the game's initial development budget of around ¥2 billion ($13 million). Sketches from early in-development indicated the game was originally going to be set within the open wilds of Pokémon Gold and Silver's region, Johto, but during a time before Pokémon trainers existed, with the plot said to be about the origin of trainers. The protagonist would be a time traveller who would go on to revive three Pokémon. This version of Legends 2 would have been released in two versions, referred to as Pokémon Legends: Ho-Oh and Pokémon Legends: Lugia, and they were to be released in 2024 as a celebration of the 25th anniversary of Gold and Silver. These ideas were scrapped in favor of a modern Kalos setting. The leak also contained information regarding the Mega Dimension DLC, reporting that 16 Pokémon would receive Mega forms. Other parts of the Freakleak pertained to information about unannounced future titles that plan to release up to 2030, including the mainline installments for the tenth generation and a 3rd Legends game.

== Reception ==
Reception

Aggregate scores
Aggregator	Score
Metacritic	NS: 70/100 (Note: Score based on nine reviews); NS2: 78/100 (Note: Score based on 106 reviews)
OpenCritic	65% recommend (Note: Score based on 135 reviews); 56% recommend (Mega Dimension) (Note: Based on 18 reviews)

Review scores
Publication	Score
4Players	9/10
Eurogamer	3/5
Famitsu	8/10, 9/10, 9/10, 9/10
Gamekult	6/10
GameSpot	7/10
GamesRadar+	4/5
HobbyConsolas	85/100
IGN	8/10
Jeuxvideo.com	15/20
MeriStation	8.6/10
Nintendo Life	6/10 (NS); 7/10 (NS2)
Shacknews	9/10
TechRadar	4.5/5
Video Games Chronicle	5/5
VG247	4/5
The Washington Post	2.5/4

The game received "generally favorable" reviews for the Switch 2 version and "mixed or average" reviews for the Switch version, according to the review aggregator website Metacritic. On OpenCritic, 65% of critics recommended the game. In Japan, four critics from Famitsu gave the game a total score of 35 out of 40. Alana Hagues of Nintendo Life praised the battles as well as the game's performance on Nintendo Switch 2, but she criticized the visuals for being "lifeless and flat". Hagues also felt that the game's Lumiose City setting was restrictive. Zackerie Fairfax writing for Dexerto stated that the game has good performance "but limited exploration and shallow side content", concluding the game to be "ok".

=== Sales ===
Within the game's first week of release, the game had sold over 5.8 million units worldwide. In Japan, the game sold 1.48 million units within its first four days of launch, with its Switch and Switch 2 versions respectively taking the first and second spots in Japan's weekly sales charts. As of September 30, 2026, the game has sold 13.31 million copies, including 9.27 million on the Switch and 4.04 million on the Switch 2.
