= Aquapolis =

Aquapolis may refer to:

- the centerpiece structure of Expo '75 in Okinawa, Japan
- a Pokémon Trading Card Game set
