= Base Set (Pokémon) =

Card game set

- A Pokémon Trading Card Game booster box
- Other names: 1st Starter & Expansion Pack/Base Set
- Manufacturers: Creatures Inc.
- Illustrators: List: Ken Sugimori; Mitsuhiro Arita; Keiji Kinebuchi; Tomoaki Imakuni
- Publishers: Media Factory (JP); Wizards of the Coast (NA)
- Publication: JP: October 20, 1996; NA: January 9, 1999
- Series: Pokémon Trading Card Game
- Media type: Tabletop collectible card game
- No. of cards: 102

Base Set, known in Japan as 1st Starter & Expansion Pack (第1弾スターターパック & 第1弾拡張パック), is the first set of cards in the Pokémon Trading Card Game created by Creatures Inc. It was released in Japan on October 20, 1996, and in the United States on January 9, 1999. It consists of 102 cards; the cards in the set are based on Pokémon species from the first generation of the series.

Like other sets in the series, the game puts two players against each other, and each player aims to defeat their opponent by knocking out the opponent's Pokémon or rendering them unable to continue playing. The Japanese release was published by Media Factory, and Wizards of the Coast handled production in the United States. The set has been featured in multiple versions and reprints, including the Game Boy Color video game Pokémon Trading Card Game and in future sets like XY: Evolutions and Celebrations.

The value of Pokémon cards was initially high before experiencing a market crash a year after its US release. The value of Pokémon cards, especially Base Set, eventually saw a marked increase in the 2020s, with influencer Logan Paul credited as being partly responsible by purchasing and opening Base Set boxes on live stream. Some of the cards have characteristics that have made them more expensive, such as an error in which a drop shadow had been removed. The Base Set contains some of the most valuable Pokémon cards, especially the first edition Charizard and the erroneously printed pre-release Raichu.

== Concept ==
An uncut sheet of cards. Each card has a different element, art, and stats.

The Pokémon Trading Card Game is a strategy card game where two players compete against each other with a deck of at least 60 cards, each using their Pokémon to knock out their opponent's Pokémon. It features Pokémon species and characters from the first generation of the Pokémon series. These Pokémon cards have a certain amount of Hit Points (HP), as well as attacks and abilities called "Pokémon Powers". Each player must have an active Pokémon, and can have anywhere from zero to five benched Pokémon that can be swapped in if the active Pokémon is knocked out or swapped out. When an opponent's Pokémon's HP is depleted, the player takes from six "prize cards", taken from their deck at the beginning of the game, with the victor being who takes all prize cards first. A player can also lose if, after their active Pokémon is defeated, there are no benched Pokémon to replace it, or if a player's deck is emptied and they fail to draw a card at the beginning of their turn.

A deck consists of multiple types of cards. The first type is the Pokémon card, which can be one of seven elemental types: Colorless, Electric, Fighting, Fire, Grass, Psychic, and Water. Each Pokémon card has a weakness or resistance that affects how much damage is dealt, such as Charmander, who takes more damage from Water Pokémon. The next card type is Trainer cards that can be used to affect the outcome of the battle. The third card type is the Energy card, of which each is associated with one of the six elements and are needed in order for a Pokémon species to use their various techniques. Techniques specify the type of Energy required to use them; a card may show four Fire Energy symbols, meaning that four Fire Energy cards must be attached to that Pokémon card. If a technique shows the Colorless energy symbol, any type of Energy card can be used to cover the cost. Some attacks may also use a mixture of Colorless and another Energy type. Energy can also be discarded from a Pokémon card to allow the Pokémon to be swapped with a benched Pokémon. Each Pokémon card is either a Basic or an Evolution card. Basic Pokémon can be put into play without any complication, while Evolution cards need to be played on top of another specific card. Some Evolution cards can be played on other Evolution cards. A Pokémon cannot be evolved into the next stage on the same turn that the previous stage was put into play.

At the start of a match, a coin is flipped to determine who goes first. Once both players have placed an active Basic Pokémon into play from their hand and picked how many, if any, will be benched, the top six cards of their deck will be put into the players' respective prize card pools face down. Some Pokémon attacks have custom rules to determine what they do and how effective they are; for example, some cards do a certain amount of damage multiplied by however many Energy cards are attached. while others may inflict status effects, such as poisoning, which causes a Pokémon card to sustain a certain amount of damage on the opponent's turn. In addition to these techniques, some Pokémon have Pokémon Powers that can affect play.

The Base Set expansion was accompanied by five pre-made card sets. Each of these sets come with at least 60 cards.

Set name	Type focus
2-Player Starter Set	Fighting and Fire
Blackout	Water and Fighting
Brushfire	Fire and Grass
Overgrowth	Water and Grass
Zap!	Electric and Psychic

While the other four sets have 60 cards, the 2-Player Starter Set consists of 61 cards: two 30-card decks, each themed around a type, and an additional holofoil Machamp card.

== Development and release ==
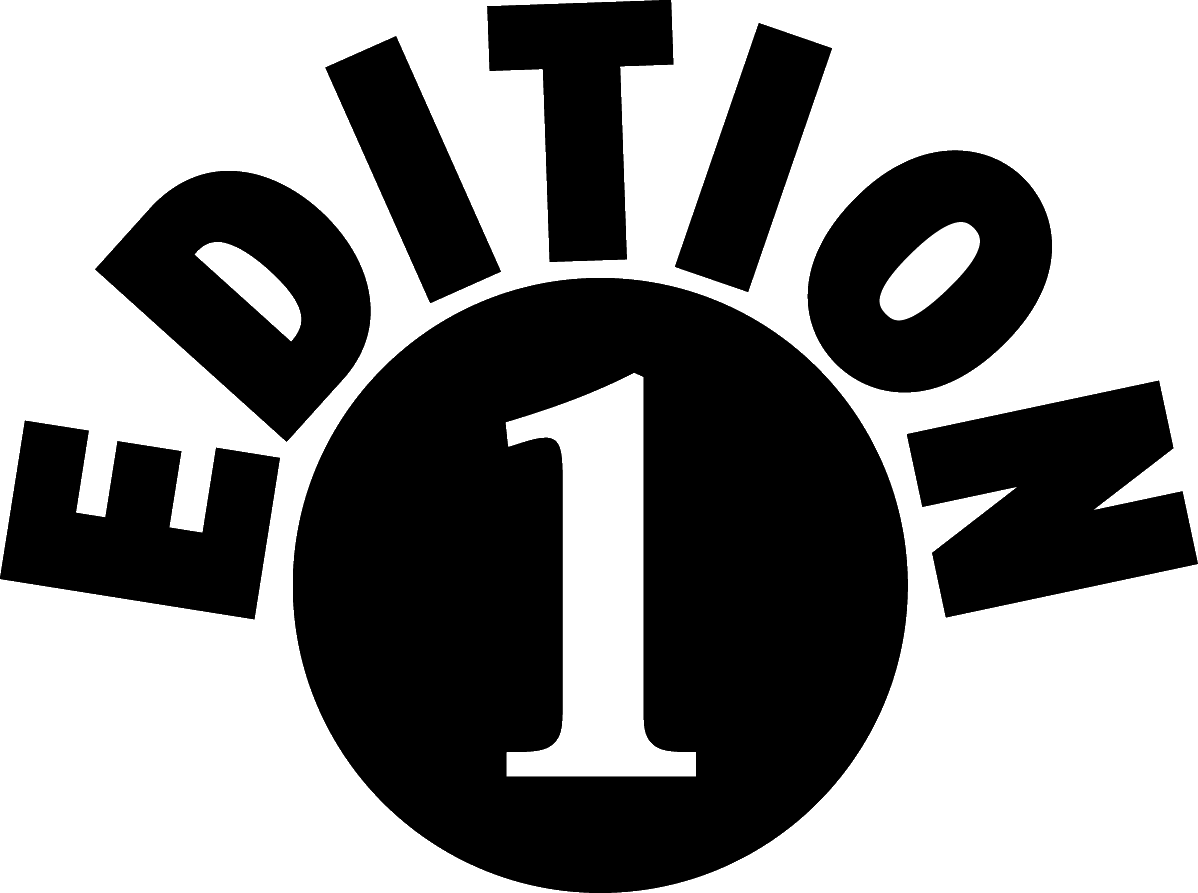
The symbol for First Edition cards in the Pokémon Trading Card Game outside of Japan

Development of the Pokémon Trading Card game was handled in Japan by Creatures Inc. The backgrounds of Base Set cards utilizes either real photos, 3D graphics, and hand-drawn art, many of which were sourced from a collection of stock images called Datacraft Sozaijiten. It was first released in Japan on October 20 1996, published by Media Factory. In Japan, the packs feature art drawn by Mitsuhiro Arita, while the English release has three possible packs, each depicting either Venusaur, Charizard, or Blastoise. In the first printing, cards have an "Edition 1" stamp denoting that it is a First Edition card. Another printing, called the Unlimited printing, was later released, and the first print had error cards called "Shadowless cards", as cards lacked a drop shadow on the bottom and right border of the Pokémon's frame. Later Unlimited releases fixed this error.

Prior to the Base Set's English release on January 9, 1999, Wizards of the Coast released a set of cards called "1998 Pokémon Demo Game Plastic Pack". As part of the development of the set, Wizards of the Coast created a pre-release test card depicting the Pokémon Raichu that has PRERELEASE stamped with green text. Despite not being intended to be included, anywhere from eight to eleven Raichu cards were discovered to have appeared with this stamp on them during a printing of pre-release Clefable cards in the subsequent Jungle expansion. These error cards were taken by employees; their existence was denied until 2006, when an employee confirmed they existed. Another early error saw a limited number of cards printed with the back art of a Magic: The Gathering card instead of the normal back art.

The Base Set expansion has been featured in multiple video games. A PC game titled 2-Player CD-ROM Starter Set was released featuring cards from the Base Set, as well as a physical Machamp card. The Game Boy Color video game Pokémon Trading Card Game also features cards from the Base Set, among others. The computer software Apprentice, which was designed for playing Magic: The Gathering on the Internet, was modified by Pokémon fans to be capable of playing Base Set and other Pokémon Trading Card Game sets released at the time. A 6x8" Pikachu card was included in Top Deck magazine. Wizards of the Coast followed Base Set with another expansion called Jungle on June 16, 1999.

== List of cards ==
Base Set contains a total of 102 cards; of these, 69 are based on Pokémon species, 16 of which can be holofoil (all of which are also rare). The remaining 33 cards include Trainer and Energy cards. Of these, the art is either done by Ken Sugimori, Mitsuhiro Arita, Keiji Kinebuchi, or Tomoaki Imakuni.

Card name	Element	Rarity	Artist
Alakazam	Psychic	Holofoil	Ken Sugimori
Blastoise	Water	Holofoil	Ken Sugimori
Chansey	Normal	Holofoil	Ken Sugimori
Charizard	Fire	Holofoil	Mitsuhiro Arita
Clefairy	Normal	Holofoil	Ken Sugimori
Gyarados	Water	Holofoil	Mitsuhiro Arita
Hitmonchan	Fighting	Holofoil	Ken Sugimori
Machamp	Fighting	Holofoil	Ken Sugimori
Magneton	Electric	Holofoil	Keiji Kinebuchi
Mewtwo	Psychic	Holofoil	Ken Sugimori
Nidoking	Grass	Holofoil	Ken Sugimori
Ninetales	Fire	Holofoil	Ken Sugimori
Poliwrath	Water	Holofoil	Ken Sugimori
Raichu	Electric	Holofoil	Ken Sugimori
Venusaur	Grass	Holofoil	Mitsuhiro Arita
Zapdos	Electric	Holofoil	Ken Sugimori
Beedrill	Grass	Rare	Ken Sugimori
Dragonair	Normal	Rare	Mitsuhiro Arita
Dugtrio	Fighting	Rare	Keiji Kinebuchi
Electabuzz	Electric	Rare	Ken Sugimori
Electrode	Electric	Rare	Keiji Kinebuchi
Pidgeotto	Normal	Rare	Ken Sugimori
Arcanine	Fire	Uncommon	Ken Sugimori
Charmeleon	Fire	Uncommon	Mitsuhiro Arita
Dewgong	Water	Uncommon	Mitsuhiro Arita
Dratini	Normal	Uncommon	Ken Sugimori
Farfetch'd	Normal	Uncommon	Ken Sugimori
Growlithe	Fire	Uncommon	Ken Sugimori
Haunter	Psychic	Uncommon	Keiji Kinebuchi
Ivysaur	Grass	Uncommon	Ken Sugimori
Jynx	Psychic	Uncommon	Ken Sugimori
Kadabra	Psychic	Uncommon	Ken Sugimori
Kakuna	Grass	Uncommon	Keiji Kinebuchi
Machoke	Fighting	Uncommon	Ken Sugimori
Magikarp	Water	Uncommon	Mitsuhiro Arita
Magmar	Fire	Uncommon	Ken Sugimori
Nidorino	Grass	Uncommon	Mitsuhiro Arita
Poliwhirl	Water	Uncommon	Ken Sugimori
Porygon	Normal	Uncommon	Tomoaki Imakuni
Raticate	Normal	Uncommon	Ken Sugimori
Seel	Water	Uncommon	Ken Sugimori
Wartortle	Water	Uncommon	Ken Sugimori
Abra	Psychic	Common	Mitsuhiro Arita
Bulbasaur	Grass	Common	Mitsuhiro Arita
Caterpie	Grass	Common	Ken Sugimori
Charmander	Fire	Common	Mitsuhiro Arita
Diglett	Fighting	Common	Keiji Kinebuchi
Doduo	Normal	Common	Mitsuhiro Arita
Drowzee	Psychic	Common	Ken Sugimori
Gastly	Psychic	Common	Keiji Kinebuchi
Koffing	Grass	Common	Mitsuhiro Arita
Machop	Fighting	Common	Mitsuhiro Arita
Magnemite	Electric	Common	Keiji Kinebuchi
Metapod	Grass	Common	Ken Sugimori
Nidoran♂	Grass	Common	Ken Sugimori
Onix	Fighting	Common	Ken Sugimori
Pidgey	Normal	Common	Ken Sugimori
Pikachu	Electric	Common	Mitsuhiro Arita
Poliwag	Water	Common	Ken Sugimori
Ponyta	Fire	Common	Ken Sugimori
Rattata	Normal	Common	Mitsuhiro Arita
Sandshrew	Fighting	Common	Ken Sugimori
Squirtle	Water	Common	Mitsuhiro Arita
Starmie	Water	Common	Keiji Kinebuchi
Staryu	Water	Common	Keiji Kinebuchi
Tangela	Grass	Common	Mitsuhiro Arita
Voltorb	Electric	Common	Keiji Kinebuchi
Vulpix	Fire	Common	Ken Sugimori
Weedle	Grass	Common	Mitsuhiro Arita
Clefairy Doll	Trainer Card	Rare	Keiji Kinebuchi
Computer Search	Trainer Card	Rare	Keiji Kinebuchi
Devolution Spray	Trainer Card	Rare	Keiji Kinebuchi
Imposter Professor Oak	Trainer Card	Rare	Ken Sugimori
Item Finder	Trainer Card	Rare	Keiji Kinebuchi
Lass	Trainer Card	Rare	Ken Sugimori
Pokémon Breeder	Trainer Card	Rare	Ken Sugimori
Pokémon Trader	Trainer Card	Rare	Ken Sugimori
Scoop Up	Trainer Card	Rare	Keiji Kinebuchi
Super Energy Removal	Trainer Card	Rare	Keiji Kinebuchi
Defender	Trainer Card	Uncommon	Keiji Kinebuchi
Energy Retrieval	Trainer Card	Uncommon	Keiji Kinebuchi
Full Heal	Trainer Card	Uncommon	Keiji Kinebuchi
Maintenance	Trainer Card	Uncommon	Keiji Kinebuchi
PlusPower	Trainer Card	Uncommon	Keiji Kinebuchi
Pokémon Center	Trainer Card	Uncommon	Keiji Kinebuchi
Pokémon Flute	Trainer Card	Uncommon	Keiji Kinebuchi
Pokédex	Trainer Card	Uncommon	Keiji Kinebuchi
Professor Oak	Trainer Card	Uncommon	Ken Sugimori
Revive	Trainer Card	Uncommon	Keiji Kinebuchi
Super Potion	Trainer Card	Uncommon	Keiji Kinebuchi
Bill	Trainer Card	Common	Ken Sugimori
Energy Removal	Trainer Card	Common	Keiji Kinebuchi
Gust of Wind	Trainer Card	Common	Keiji Kinebuchi
Potion	Trainer Card	Common	Keiji Kinebuchi
Switch	Trainer Card	Common	Keiji Kinebuchi
Double Colorless Energy	Energy Card	Uncommon	Keiji Kinebuchi
Fighting Energy	Energy Card	Common	Keiji Kinebuchi
Fire Energy	Energy Card	Common	Keiji Kinebuchi
Grass Energy	Energy Card	Common	Keiji Kinebuchi
Lightning Energy	Energy Card	Common	Keiji Kinebuchi
Psychic Energy	Energy Card	Common	Keiji Kinebuchi
Water Energy	Energy Card	Common	Keiji Kinebuchi

=== Reprints ===
The fourth set of cards in the United States, Base Set 2, was released in February 2000, containing 130 cards. This set contains cards found in the Base Set and Jungle expansion, some with minor changes made to them for rule clarification purposes. There are also no first edition cards due to the cards having been found in other sets previously. Certain cards were not reprinted for this set due to a lack of popularity. Other cards were left out due to them getting new cards in a later set. Base Set 2 was the first set released by Wizards of the Coast that was not a translation of a Japanese set. In 2016, several cards from Base Set were included in a pack of cards in Japan to commemorate the 20th anniversary. The expansion XY: Evolutions released in 2019 to commemorate the 20th anniversary of the English release date, featuring updated reprints of cards from the Base Set. These updates included changing the way cards were formatted, gameplay mechanics changes, and art modifications. Multiple cards were reprinted as part of the Celebrations expansion pack in 2021, a collection of card reprints from various sets, Base Set included. Card artist Mitsuhiro Arita remade his Base Set Pikachu card art for this set, making it a full art card with greater detail and added Pokémon in the background. In 2023, a collection of cards was released called "Pokémon Trading Card Game Classic" featuring Venusaur, Charizard, and Blastoise.

== Popularity and value ==
The Base Set is believed to be the start of the Pokémon craze in 1999 by Collectors, a conglomeration of companies that enables buying, selling, and trading of collectibles. It was initially a valuable collector's item in 1999, but experienced a market crash about a year later. The New York Times writer Julian E. Barnes compared this crash to the dot-com bubble that occurred around the same time, remarking that this would be many children's introduction to volatile markets. The crash saw Wizards of the Coast lay off 100 employees.

Since this initial crash, the Base Set of cards has become a valuable collectible, both for individual cards and unopened packs and boxes. In 2018, an unopened 1st edition Base Set box sold for $56,000, while in 2022, another unopened first edition box sold for $408,000, a record price for the item. A fourth print box was valued at £20,000 in 2023. In 2019, a complete set of first edition cards from Base Set sold for $107,010 at auction. These cards were kept in plastic cases, each having been graded in "gem mint 10" condition. On the show Antiques Roadshow in 2023, a binder of cards was estimated to be worth up to $10,000.

The Pokémon Trading Card Game is said to have seen a market boom for cards in 2020 that grew larger due in part to Logan Paul opening a Base Set booster box on stream valued at $200,000. In 2021, Paul opened a first edition Base Set booster box valued at $1 million, pulling two holographic Charizards among others, which would sell for $750,000 each in mint condition according to GameSpot writer Darryn Bonthuys. In 2022, Paul paid $3.5 million for a box of first edition Base Set booster boxes. His purchase was followed by speculation that a scam was involved, partly because that particular box had previously sold for $71,900 – when a single one of the six boxes it contained was worth up to $430,000. Such a valuable item being sold on eBay also seemed suspicious, as did the lack of fading and a mismatched barcode. The speculation was confirmed when Paul streamed the opening. The authenticator stated that he felt the boxes looked "indisputably official" when he first saw them, though according to GameSpot writer Jessica Cogswell, the boxes seemed like they had "obviously been tampered with". The Pokémon booster boxes were in fact filled with G.I. Joe trading cards.

Due to Base Set's popularity, every card from the set sells for more than it did when released. Multiple cards from Base Set rank among the most valuable cards according to TheGamer and The Mary Sue staff. A pre-release Raichu card that was erroneously printed sold for $550,000 in 2025. It was the first to be publicly sold, and one of only three such cards to be professionally graded for their quality. This made it the third-most expensive card ever sold in the Pokémon Trading Card Game. Cards erroneously printed with Magic: The Gathering card back art have proven valuable. An early design concept for the Pokémon Trading Card Game, professionally graded as mint, was listed alongside multiple Base Set cards, including a first edition Base Set holofoil Charizard and a disco hole square cut test print, all three estimated to sell for up to $500,000 each. A sheet of uncut first edition Pokémon cards went up for auction in February 2022, containing first edition Shadowless cards, as well as holofoil cards that may have been as part of a print test run. It sold for $171,600 later that month. Another uncut test print sold a year later for $250,000. The Machamp card featured in the Base Set expansion is among the less valuable holofoil cards due to being printed in high quantities. Despite the low value of this card, the Machamp variant card that was included in the Base Set CD-ROM Starter Set was worth significantly more, with a mint condition graded card selling for more than $1,000.

=== Charizard ===
Charizard, particularly a holographic shadowless first edition Base Set Charizard, is among the most valuable Pokémon Trading Card Game cards. According to IGN writer Jack DeVries, players of the game cared about getting a Charizard more than any other card due to how powerful it was in gameplay. Bleeding Cool writer Theo Dwyer identified the Base Set Charizard card as both the most memorable image from the Pokémon Trading Card Game and possibly more iconic than any other trading card. Like DeVries, he identified it as a fan favorite among collectors, stating that even people who didn't play the game became interested in it due to the card's powerful stats. Early on in the life of the trading card game, a Charizard sold on eBay for upwards of $375; when the market crashed, a Charizard would go for around $100.

In 2017, this card in its highest quality was worth $55,650, increasing to $420,000 in March 2022. The popularity of this card was attributed by Dot Esports staff to a combination of the cards' traits and Charizard being a popular Pokémon. Dot Esports writer Lyssa Chatterton stated that a First Edition Charizard card was rare to find in verified mint condition without spending thousands of dollars, but noted that people could buy an ungraded Charizard for hundreds of dollars instead. This card has been sought after by multiple celebrities, including Logan Paul and the rapper Logic, who purchased one for $150,000 and $226,000 respectively. Paul wore one of his graded Charizard cards on a necklace during a boxing match, while influencer Gary Vee speculated that it was undervalued at $300,000 and should be worth $1 million. Vice writer Jason Koebler discussed having purchased a first edition Charizard for $5 and ultimately selling it for $150 back in 1999, expressing dismay that it could now be sold for more than the cost of a house but appreciated the sale for helping shape who he was. In 2022, a man pleaded guilty for spending an Economic Injury Disaster Loan from the Small Business Administration on a Charizard card, intended to provide relief during the COVID-19 pandemic.

== See also ==
- List of Pokémon Trading Card Game sets
