= Pokémon TCG Online =

2011 online video game

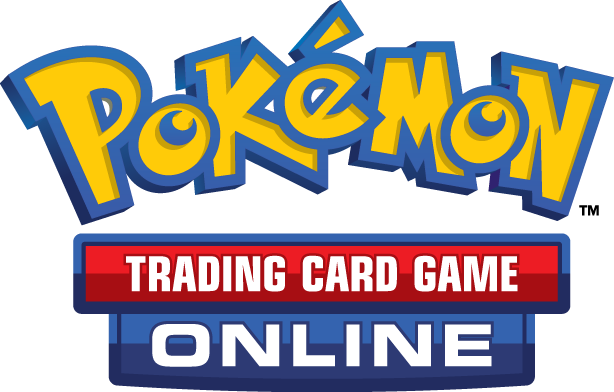
- Developer: Dire Wolf Digital
- Publisher: The Pokémon Company International
- Series: Pokémon
- Engine: Unity
- Platforms: Windows; Android; iOS; macOS
- Release: Web Browser; 24 March 2011; Windows; 15 May 2012 macOS; 5 November 2012 iOS; 30 September 2014; Android; 7 April 2016
- Genre: Digital collectible card game
- Modes: Multiplayer, single-player

Pokémon TCG Online was a 2011 video game based on the Pokémon Trading Card Game developed by Dire Wolf Digital, a studio based in Denver, Colorado. The game was available for Microsoft Windows, macOS, iOS and Android. It was originally released in March 2011 under the name of Pokémon Trainer Challenge as a browser-based game.

On 20 September 2021 it was announced that Pokémon Trading Card Game Online would soon be replaced by Pokémon Trading Card Game Live upon release. Existing players were able to transfer their account and game data to Pokémon Trading Card Game Live upon release. In November 2021, it was announced that the game would be delayed until 2022. On 5 June 2023, Pokémon Trading Card Game Online shut down.

== Gameplay ==
Pokémon TCG Online in card collection feature during the game

Pokémon Trading Card Game Online is a video game simulation of the tabletop collectible card game with role-playing elements similar to the main Pokémon role playing series. Players challenge non-player characters and other online players to card battles using 60-card decks.

In the Trainer Challenge mode, the player competes against a range of computer-controlled characters using pre-constructed theme decks. Winning a number of matches earns booster packs of cards. This is one of the easiest modes in the game, so is recommended for newer players.

In Versus Mode, human players compete against one another. Winning earns tokens or tournament entry tickets, as well as Versus Points that contribute to earning prizes from a Versus Ladder that is reset every three weeks, adding new prizes and removing all Versus Points. There are four play modes. In Theme mode, only pre-constructed theme decks may be used. In standard mode the player's deck can only use cards which are legal in the current standard rotation (each year older cards are retired from play). Expanded mode allows cards from the expanded rotation. In unlimited mode, any cards are allowed, however the unlimited mode has been restricted to only be a playable option with online friends in a Friend Battle or training against a NPC.

Tournament mode involves eight players fight through three rounds of a single–elimination style contest. The rewards increase in-line with the finishing position of the player. Winning at least one match in a ticket-entry ensures a tradable booster pack as a reward. Winning matches earns tokens which can be used to purchase untradable items from in game shop such as non-special booster packs of cards, pre-constructed theme decks or avatar customization items.

The game initially offered three starting decks, and featured more content after release. After 6 April 2011, players could buy cards from the Black and White series, which have a code to be digitally represented. Players can also create a custom avatar. There were booster pack codes which allow booster packs up to Black and White—Boundaries Crossed to be purchased from the online shop. However, as of Black and White—Plasma Storm, the code card within booster packs are now directly redeemed as online booster packs of their respective set.

== Development and release ==
Pokémon Trading Card Game Online was co-developed by Dire Wolf and Dire Wolf Digital LLC, and published by The Pokémon Company International. It was released on 24 March 2011.

It was followed by Pokémon Trading Card Game Live after TCG Online's servers were shut down in 2023. Live was announced in 2021 and was initially delayed until 2022, with promises of transferring card data from Online to Live once it took effect. In November 2021, it was announced that the game would be delayed until 2022.

== Reception ==
GamesRadar praised the game, stating "Everything looks to be faithfully recreated, including the card mat, prize card layout, and even coins."

Reception

Aggregate score
Aggregator	Score
Metacritic	78/100

Review score
Publication	Score
IGN	6/10
