= List of Pokémon Trading Card Game sets =

The Pokémon Trading Card Game collectible card game was released in Japan in 1996. As of December 2025, there are 126 card sets for the game released in English and as of April 2022, there are 91 released in Japan, including special sets. As of September 2017, collectively, there are 6,959 cards in Japanese sets and 9,110 cards in English sets. As of March 2017, 23.6 billion cards have been shipped worldwide.

The sets are generally divided into two categories: Wizards of the Coast cards, and cards made after Nintendo's acquisition of the franchise.

== First generation sets ==
=== 1998 Pokémon Demo Game Plastic Pack ===
The 1998 Pokémon Demo Game Pack were the earliest cards to be released in the English Pokémon TCG and served as the introduction to Pokémon cards in the United States. This Pokémon pack consists of 24 Base Set shadowless cards and an instruction manual.

=== Pokémon Base Set ===
Base Set (Japanese: 第1弾スターターパック & 第1弾拡張パック 1st Starter & Expansion Pack) is the name given to the first expansion of cards and Theme Decks for the Pokémon Trading Card Game. Released in Japan on October 20, 1996, one month after Bandai Pokémon Carddass 100 Pocket Monster Part 1 and in the United States on January 9, 1999. It is the only set not to have a set logo or symbol (except error "no symbol" Jungle cards). It is one of limited number of sets to include a full set of basic Energy cards. The set also contained Double Colorless Energy, the first special Energy card. Merchandising also included four theme decks, based on different strategies (offensive, defensive, tactical and speed). A 2-player starter package was also available, which included two half-sized decks, markers, a player's guide, a rulebook, and a playmat.

"1st edition" print and early ("2nd issue") prints have a slightly different design than the standard "unlimited" ("3rd issue") prints. These early prints are generally brighter in color, use a thinner font, have the year 1999 included in the copyright notice, and lack the shadow around the pictures. Because of this, these cards are known as "shadowless" cards among collectors. Since there were fewer 1st edition and "shadowless" cards printed, these are rarer than the "unlimited" print. ("4th issue") cards have the year 2000 included in their copyright notices, these were released exclusively in Europe.

=== Jungle ===
Jungle is the second expansion and was released on June 16, 1999. After being a very small set in Japan, the English set started the trend of having both holo and non-holo editions of rare cards, effectively doubling the number of rares in the set. Unlike Base Set, it had only two theme decks. Its expansion symbol resembles a Vileplume. During production, some of the Jungle holos were printed without the jungle symbol. The 64-card set included 45 new pokémon, two from the Base Set with new powers (Electrode and Pikachu), and one trainer (Poké Ball).

=== Fossil ===
Fossil released on October 10, 1999, is the third expansion set in the Pokémon Trading Card Game. The 62-card set was sold in 11-card booster packs and contained the fewest cards of any standard set in the card game for some time. This set was known for the first TCG appearance of Ditto.

=== Base Set 2 ===
Base Set 2 is the fourth expansion set, released only in English on February 24, 2000. It is a compilation of selected cards from previous sets. Wizards of the Coast started a trend of releasing compilation sets. This set contains 130 cards and its set symbol is a Pokéball with the number 2 running through it. As Base Set 2 only featured reissues of previous cards, it did not feature any "First Edition" cards in its print run.

=== Team Rocket ===
Team Rocket, released on April 24, 2000, is the fifth expansion in the Pokémon Trading Card Game. The title refers to a criminal organization from the video games Pokémon Red, Pokémon Blue, and Pokémon Yellow, and features the trio Jessie, James and Meowth who relentlessly follow the protagonists in the animated series. Its symbol is the R of the Team Rocket organization.

The set introduced the Dark Pokémon, Pokémon corrupted and controlled by the Team Rocket organization. After the release of this set, Dark Pokémon would not show a strong presence until the set's sequel released four years later, Team Rocket Returns.

As part of a promotional campaign, the set included an exclusive English only Dark Raichu, although it was eventually released in Japanese, it was the first "secret" rare card, numbered "83/82".

=== Gym Heroes ===
Gym Heroes, released on August 14, 2000, is the 6th set of 132 cards in the Pokémon Trading Card Game. Its symbol is an amphitheater with a black stage and white tiers. Its name comes from the Gym Leaders it focuses on and how these first four Gym Leaders have relatively optimistic and carefree personalities compared to those featured in Gym Challenge. This set also introduced a card layout change, eliminating the flavor text and stacking the weakness/resistance/level to fit the Gym Leader's headshot/badge.

This is the first set to have Owner's Pokémon, the owners being the Gym Leaders of the various Pokémon Gyms around Kanto. While Sabrina and Blaine are also represented in this set, the most attention is paid to the first four met in the video games: Brock, Misty, Lt. Surge, and Erika. Each of their Pokémon reflects their favorite Pokémon types, as well as the Pokémon they have been seen carrying in the TV show. For example, Brock specializes in the Rock-type, so a lot of his cards in the card game are Rock Pokémon. However, in the anime, he also carried a Vulpix, a Fire-type, which is also included in this set.

The owner's Pokémon must be evolved from a Pokémon of the same owner, which also proved to be unpopular, as the element of mixing and matching cards from different sets is lost. Additionally, some of the "Rare" cards had little or no value in play, such as Misty's Tentacool, which is incapable of doing damage and is overshadowed by a better version of the "Uncommon" rarity. However, Owner's Pokémon have been sporadically released in Japan, though except for those within EX Team Magma vs Team Aqua, none have been translated into English. This set was originally released with theme decks that contained cards not found in the main set in Japan, released in the odd rarities for Basic Pokémon.

This set is also the first set to introduce Stadium cards, Trainer cards that stay in play until another Stadium card comes into play. Unlike Pokémon Tool cards that were introduced later on, Stadium cards are not attached to Pokémon.

=== Gym Challenge ===
Gym Challenge, released on October 16, 2000, is the 7th set of cards in the Pokémon Trading Card Game. Its expansion symbol is an amphitheater and black tiers, the inverse of the Gym Heroes symbol. It also has a set of 132 cards. Its name comes from the four characters from the anime it focuses on (Sabrina, Koga, Blaine, and Giovanni).

== Second generation sets ==
=== Neo Genesis ===
Neo Genesis, released in December 2000, is the 8th set of 111 cards in the Pokémon Trading Card Game. Its symbol is a pair of stars, one in front of the other. Neo is Greek for "new", and Genesis is Greek for "birth" or "beginning". Neo Genesis features second-generation Pokémon that come from the region of Johto and is the first set to do so. With it comes two new Pokémon types: Darkness and Metal, each with its own Special Energy cards.

The design on the cards has also changed, now looking closer to the Japanese version. The hit points displayed on the upper-right are now smaller, and their color has changed from red to black. The statistics on the bottom of the card now have dune-shaped indentations in the background immediately behind each stat. The text reading "Basic Pokémon" is now directly under the HP (Hit Points) instead of in the upper-left corner. The information about the Pokémon directly below the illustration is now in a parallelogram instead of a rectangle.

Two cards from this set were banned from tournament play: Sneasel and Slowking. Controversial Japanese illustrations of the cards Moo-Moo Milk, Arcade Game, and Card-Flip Game were significantly changed in the English release.

It was at this point the 2 different play formats were realized: Unlimited (allowing all cards to be played), and Limited where only the Neo Genesis cards could be played (this limited format would go through a few changes whereas more sets were released where the rules were changed to "Neo Genesis and newer cards are allowed to be played in official tournaments" this would later be changed to be "only the 8 most recent sets are legal for tournament play"). At this point, the idea of "proxy" cards became frequent at tournaments where an older card could be used as a placeholder for a card a player only had a single print of.

=== Neo Discovery ===
Neo Discovery, released in June 2001, is the ninth set of 75 cards in the Pokémon Trading Card Game. Its symbol is a Mayan temple. While the architectural structure of the ruins is ambiguous in the video games Pokémon Gold, Silver, and Crystal, in Pokémon 3: The Movie, they seem to be of Central or South American origin. Neo Discovery premieres many second-generation Pokémon into the TCG, such as Smeargle, Politoed, and Wobbuffet and may be considered a counterpart to the Jungle set, (which introduced another third of the original 150 Pokémon).

The Unown are Pokémon-themed on the English alphabet. At the time of Neo Discovery's release, there were 26 types, one for each letter. (Later, Unown ? and Unown ! would be introduced, bringing the total to 28.) Neo Discovery introduced nine of these Pokémon into the card game. Each could affect the game in different ways related to a word starting with the letter the Unown represents. Unown "O" is associated with the word observe, and this application in the card game is done through "observing" the opponent's deck.

=== Southern Islands ===
Southern Islands is a set of cards in the Pokémon Trading Card Game. In Japan, it was released at the same time as Gym 2, while in America it came after Neo Discovery and before Neo Revelation. This set's symbol is a palm tree.

Though it is often considered the 10th set, it was a promotional set, sold as a complete collection in the form of a specially-packaged box (rather than as booster packs). The mini-set only contains a total of 18 cards. When arranged correctly, every illustration used in this set forms a single larger image.

=== Neo Revelation ===
Neo Revelation, released in October 2001, is the 11th set of 64 cards in the Pokémon Trading Card Game. Its symbol is a representation of the departure of Suicune, Entei, and Raikou from the Burned Tower.

As of the release of this set, there was at least one card of each of the 251 Pokémon, including the elusive Celebi. This set finishes the second generation with Pokémon like Porygon2, Misdreavus, and Raikou. In a way, this makes it a counterpart to the Fossil set (which rounded out the original set of 151 Pokémon). It also includes three more of the Unown introduced in Neo Discovery.

Most importantly, this set was the debut of Shining Pokémon, which are extremely powerful Basic Pokémon, but no more than one of each kind is allowed in a deck. This tradition was short-lived, however, as the Shining Pokémon were present only until the following set, Neo Destiny. However, Pokémon Star cards, which function almost identically to Shining Pokémon, were introduced in a later set known as EX Team Rocket Returns.

=== Neo Destiny ===
Neo Destiny, released in February 2002, is the 12th set in the Pokémon Trading Card Game. The set contains a total of 105 cards in the base set, with 8 additional secret "shining" cards. Its symbol is a dark blue sparkle over a light sparkle, referring to both "Dark" and "Light" Pokémon variants within the set. This set is the second set with an emphasis on using the words "Dark" and "Light" to coincide with the Pokémon's name text (ex; Light Arcanine, Dark Tyranitar), following the Team Rocket set.

=== Legendary Collection ===
The Legendary Collection, released in May 2002, is the 13th set of 110 cards in the Pokémon Trading Card Game. The set's symbol is a medal.

The Legendary Collection is the sequel to Base Set 2, made up entirely of reprints from the first four sets: Base Set, Jungle, Fossil, and Team Rocket. Its purpose is to make these cards legal in tournament play; otherwise, these cards would be considered "too old." Thus, some people could claim this set to be a third "Base Set". The Legendary Collection is the first set to have a parallel set whose only difference is that shiny foil is printed on the entire front of the card except for its illustration (this isn't done in the regular set). Strangely, even though this set is an amalgamation of four sets, this set contains fewer cards than any of the following three.

=== Expedition Base Set ===
Expedition Base Set, released in September 2002, is the 14th set of cards in the Pokémon Trading Card Game. Its symbol is a Poké Ball drawn to look like a lower-case "e". This set contains 165 cards.

It is the first to use the e-Reader: By scanning a dot code found on the bottom of all of the cards and the sides of some, the e-Reader can display patterns, produce sounds, or other various novelties. However, none of these features are required for play. Subsequent sets, up until EX Hidden Legends, would also be compatible with the e-Reader.

Because of its completely new format, this was thought to be a good time to balance the card game with less powerful versions of previously printed cards. For example, Energy Removal 2 serves an identical purpose to Energy Removal from the Base Set, except a coin must be flipped to determine if the effects are successful. However, this set also introduces the Supporter card, a type of Trainer card that now dominates the competitive play.

=== Aquapolis ===
Aquapolis, released in January 2003, is the 15th set of cards in the Pokémon Trading Card Game and consists of 186 cards. Its symbol is a skyline within a water droplet.

This set is the second of three to extensively use the e-Reader. Aquapolis introduces minigames playable by scanning in dot codes from multiple cards (in any order). These mini-games are usually very simple, and more often than not, each Pokémon whose card has been scanned in will play some role in the mini-game.

While Technical Machines were dabbled upon in Expedition, Aquapolis is the set to make use of them. Technical Machines would be released sparingly from this point onward.

The Aquapolis set was also the first Pokémon TCG set to utilize the "Crystal Type" Poké-power. This power was written on the Aquapolis cards Kingdra, Lugia, and Nidoking, all of which are holofoil. It essentially allows the player to attach a basic energy card to the Pokémon and have it become that type for the turn. Note that this power does not allow the player to attach an additional energy card per turn.

Of the 186 cards, the first 32 were designated with an "H" before the number. The 33rd card started at the number "1." Thus, the number sequence only goes up to 147 (the 3 "Crystal Types" take the number to 150/147). In addition, 4 cards received 2 versions: Golduck (50a, 50b), Drowzee (74a, 74b), Mr. Mime (95a, 95b), and Porygon (103a, 103b). These cards are identical except for the data they show when swiped through the e-Reader.

=== Skyridge ===
Skyridge, released on May 12, 2003, August 15, 2003, in both English and German respectively, is the 16th set of cards in the Pokémon Trading Card Game. Its symbol is a pair of mountains with a halo around the taller one. This is the last set published by Wizards of the Coast and has 182 cards.

This set is the last of three to extensively use the e-Reader. Skyridge continues Aquapolis' tradition of minigames playable by scanning in dot codes from multiple cards.

The Skyridge set was also the second and last set to contain Pokémon with the "Crystal Type" Poké-power. Characters in this set were Celebi, Charizard, Crobat, Golem, Ho-Oh, and Kabutops. These cards normally carry a much higher trade value on eBay and other online retailers than normal cards from this set. However, even normal cards from Skyridge are more valuable than normal cards from other sets, because Skyridge booster packs were very hard to find compared to other sets.

The numbering system for Skyridge is similar to that of Aquapolis. The first 32 cards begin with an "H" and the 33rd card starts the numbering at "1", and thus the number only goes up to 144. The 6 "Crystal Types" take it to 150/144. There are no "a" and "b" versions in Skyridge as there were in Aquapolis.

Skyridge was the last set released by Wizards of the Coast.

== Third Generation Sets ==
In July 2003, The Pokémon Company took the place of Wizards of the Coast as publisher for the cards. The first set published by Pokémon USA, Inc. was EX Ruby and Sapphire.

All of the Third Generation sets have "EX" in their name; this comes from the Pokémon EX present in these sets.

=== EX Ruby and Sapphire ===
EX Ruby and Sapphire, released on June 18, 2003, is the 17th set of 109 cards in the Pokémon Trading Card Game. This set was the first set to be adapted into English by Pokémon USA, Inc. after the card game's rights transferred back from Wizards of the Coast. Its symbol is a jewel with a brilliant cut, viewed from above. It is named after the video games Pokémon Ruby and Sapphire.

This set introduces third-generation Pokémon and continues to be scannable by the e-Reader. However, the dot codes on the left side of the card are gone, replaced with a single dot code on the bottom. Unlike the cards in Expedition, Aquapolis, and Skyridge, however, this dot code produces only where to find the Pokémon in the video games instead of completely original Pokédex information. This set yet again changes the layout of the cards; except for the dot code at the bottom (which is now absent), it is exactly the same as the Japanese layout and is the format used up to this day.

This set is also the first to have Pokémon-EX, Pokémon who are stronger than usual, but the opponent takes 2 Prize cards if one were to be Knocked Out. During its release, these Pokémon were exceedingly useful, but as more cards were released, the card game became increasingly stacked against Pokémon-EX.

=== EX Sandstorm ===
EX Sandstorm, released on September 18, 2003, is the 18th set of cards in the Pokémon Trading Card Game and the 2nd set released by Pokémon USA Inc. Its symbol is a pair of fossils: the Claw Fossil and the Root Fossil from the video games Pokémon Ruby and Sapphire. It contains 100 cards. The Sandstorm name comes from the fact that the player must retrieve these fossils in the video game from within a sandstorm.

EX Sandstorm also continues to introduce third-generation Pokémon into the card game, with many desert-themed Pokémon, such as Cacnea and Vibrava, and thereof unrelated Pokémon, such as Zangoose and Sableye. This set brings back the Mysterious Fossil from the Fossil set and expands on it with the Claw Fossil, which can be made into Anorith, and the Root Fossil, which can be made into Lileep. The Mysterious Fossil plays the same role as before, which is to evolve it into Omanyte, Kabuto, or Aerodactyl. Other Pokémon from older generations return, such as Xatu from the second generation and Psyduck from the first.

=== EX Dragon ===
EX Dragon, released in November 2003, is the 19th set of cards in the Pokémon Trading Card Game and the 3rd set released by Pokémon USA. The set's symbol is a weapon's crosshair. The set contains a total of 100 cards (97 plus 3 secret). The secret rare cards are Base Set tributes of Charmander, Charmeleon, and Charizard redrawn by Mitsuhiro Arita. The main emphasis of this set is "Dragon" type Pokémon appearing as Colorless, using two or more types of Energy.

=== EX Team Magma vs Team Aqua ===
EX Team Magma vs Team Aqua, released in March 2004, is the 20th set of cards in the Pokémon Trading Card Game and the 4th set released by Pokémon USA. The set's symbol is a maroon and navy "X" that's slightly slanted, somewhat like a cut or a scar. This set contains 95 cards and was the last set to feature e-Reader compatibility.

This set introduces Team Magma Pokémon and Team Aqua Pokémon, which are themed after the villainous Team Magma and Team Aqua. Dual-type Pokémon were also introduced.

=== EX Hidden Legends ===
EX Hidden Legends, released in June 2004, is the 21st set of cards in the Pokémon Trading Card Game and the 5th set released by Pokémon USA. Its symbol is a trapezoid with six equally-spaced smaller dots surrounding it. This entire setup is within a solid white irregular hexagon. The Hidden Legends part refers to Regirock, Regice, and Registeel, Legendary Pokémon hidden away in stone structures. This set contains 101 different cards.

This set revolves around three concepts: Regirock, Regice, and Registeel, as mentioned above; Jirachi, a Legendary Pokémon with the power of wishes; and Pokémon 4Ever with the presence of Dark Celebi. This set also continues to introduce Pokémon into the card game. In addition to the Pokémon above, Beldum and its evolution line make its debut.

=== EX Fire Red and Leaf Green ===
EX Fire Red and Leaf Green, released in September 2004, is the 22nd set of cards in the Pokémon Trading Card Game and the 6th set released by Pokémon USA. Its symbol is an emblem of a black Pokéball. It came out around the time the Nintendo video games, Pokémon Fire Red and Leaf Green were released. The set had some extra cards: 113/112 Charmander, Box Topper; 114/112 Articuno ex, Secret ex; 115/112 Moltres ex, Secret ex; and 116/112 Zapdos ex, Secret ex.

=== EX Team Rocket Returns ===
EX Team Rocket Returns, released in November 2004, is the 23rd set of cards in the Pokémon Trading Card Game and the 7th set released by Pokémon USA. The set symbol is the red Team Rocket "R" emblem. The set contains a total of 111 cards (109 plus 2 secret rares). This set also introduced "Darkness" type Pokémon variants such as Rocket's Articuno ex, Rocket's Zapdos ex, and Rocket's Moltres ex.

Team Rocket as a criminal organization – its members, the Pokémon they control, and the techniques they use for world domination are all part of the set's overall theme. EX Team Rocket Returns is a sequel to the original Team Rocket set released four years prior. This set also introduced "Gold Star" shiny (alternate color) Pokémon, called "Pokémon Star". Rare holo star Pokémon cards are indicated by a foil star symbol beside their name text. Only one Pokémon Star could be in a deck.

=== EX Deoxys ===
EX Deoxys, released in February 2005, is the 24th set of cards in the Pokémon Trading Card Game and the 8th set released by Pokémon USA. The set's symbol is a shooting star and has 107 cards. The set is named after the Pokémon Deoxys and also features Rayquaza, both of which were the featured legendary Pokémon in the seventh Pokémon movie, Pokémon: Destiny Deoxys. While the Pokémon in this set have little, if anything, to do with either of these two Pokémon, the set's Trainer cards feature people and places involved with astronomy in the Pokémon Ruby, Sapphire, and Emerald video games.

=== EX Emerald ===
EX Emerald, released in May 2005, is the 25th set of cards in the Pokémon Trading Card Game and the 9th set released by Pokémon USA. Its symbol is a gemstone, presumably an emerald. It has a set of 106 cards. Nintendo released six 15-card packs, known as Quick Construction Packs – one pack for each type of Basic Energy.

The set is also composed of Japanese promos that were never brought outside Japan. Because of this, and the fact that most promos are viewed as "unplayable" in the competitive scene, this set was largely ignored, with exceptions to Medicham ex.

=== EX Unseen Forces ===
EX Unseen Forces, released in August 2005, is the 26th set of cards in the Pokémon Trading Card Game and the 10th set released by Pokémon USA. The set's symbol is a black silhouette of Ho-Oh's wing, superimposed on a white silhouette of Lugia's wing. It is a set of 115 cards, plus 2 secret cards (including the box topper), plus 28 Unowns. The set, which in Japan was named "GoldenSky and SilverSea", is set in Johto, and is the first set by Pokémon USA to mainly consist of Pokémon from the Pokémon Gold and Silver games, released in 2001. EX Unseen Forces is known for having more Pokémon-ex than any other set to date, with a total of fourteen (including one box topper and one secret rare card).

=== EX Delta Species ===
EX Delta Species, released in October 2005, is the 27th set of cards in the Pokémon Trading Card Game and the 11th set released by Pokémon USA. It contains 113 different cards. While this set was released after EX Legends hit in Japan, it was released before Legend Maker in English-language territories. The set, which in Japan was named "Researching Tower of Holon", is set in the research centre, Holon. Its logo/symbol is Holon Tower, a tower with a broad top floor.

This set introduces rare "Delta Species" Pokémon, which are unusually unique types. For example, Tyranitar would typically be a Dark- or Fighting-type Pokémon, but in this set Tyranitar is a Metal/Fire dual-typed Pokémon. Dragonite would typically be a Colorless- Pokémon, but in this set Dragonite is a Metal/Lightning dual-typed Pokémon. It also introduces the staff of Holon Tower and their Pokémon. The Holon staff appears in the form of Supporter cards, all of which require a card to be discarded in order for them to be used, and Holon's Pokémon, which can be used as either Pokémon or as Energy cards.

=== EX Legend Maker ===
EX Legend Maker, released in February 2006, is the 28th set of 92 cards in the Pokémon Trading Card Game and the 12th set released by Pokémon USA. The set, which in Japan was named "Eidolon Forest", is set in a forest in the middle of nowhere. Its symbol is a stylized forest, a white egg-shaped area with three black acute isosceles triangles. It received the name Legend Maker due to the inclusion of Mew.

Due to a mix-up with translations, this was supposed to be released before EX Delta Species, but was delayed until February 2006 in English-language territories. This is considered by many to be a very good set, for several reasons – possibly for its similarity with Jungle and Fossil original expansions, or possibly for its exclusion of the complicated Delta Species Pokémon.

=== EX Holon Phantoms ===
EX Holon Phantoms, released in May 2006, is the 29th set of cards in the Pokémon Trading Card Game and the 13th set released by Pokémon USA. Its symbol is the Holon symbol, with three triangles around the sides. The set, which in Japan was named "Holon Phantom", is set in an undeveloped area of Holon. It marks the return of Delta Species Pokémon, after they debuted in EX Delta Species. This set contains 110 Cards in total. This set included cards such as Sharpedo, Nosepass, Torchic, and others that are selectively stamped with the EX Holon Phantoms logo. The back of the cards from this set also have a lighter back than other sets.

=== EX Crystal Guardians ===
EX Crystal Guardians, released in July 2006, is the 30th set of cards in the Pokémon Trading Card Game and the 14th set released by Pokémon USA. Its symbol is a sliver of a crystal. 100 cards are included in this set release.

=== EX Dragon Frontiers ===
EX Dragon Frontiers, released in November 2006, is the 31st set of cards in the Pokémon Trading Card Game and the 15th set released by Pokémon USA. Its symbol is a pair of black mountains on a circular white background. It is a set of 101 cards. The set is based on an unknown set of islands far away, inhabited primarily by Dragon Pokémon. This set marks the final appearance of Delta Species Pokémon, and, strangely, almost every single Pokémon card is Delta Species. There are even "Delta Star" Pokémon, Mew, and Charizard, whose type depends on their alternate color (Shiny form), which is, in this case, Water and Dark, respectively.

This set introduces a new mechanic: Shockwave and Imprison markers. These markers are similar to special conditions, except that they can be applied to Benched Pokémon and that they don't go away when the Pokémon moves to the Bench. Only three cards in the set use these markers, however: two Pokémon place the markers, and one Pokémon can remove them.

=== EX Power Keepers ===
EX Power Keepers, released in February 2007, is the 32nd set of cards in the Pokémon Trading Card Game. The symbol for this set is a road leading to a vanishing horizon on which the sun is either rising or setting. It is a set of 108 cards.

It is the first set since EX Emerald to be released only outside Japan, and the first since EX Unseen Forces not to include Delta Species Pokémon. The set is loosely based on the Hoenn Elite Four, as all four members (Drake, Glacia, Phoebe, and Sidney) have their own Stadium cards, and the Pokémon-EX is all Pokémon owned by members of the Elite Four. The set also consists of several reprints of cards from older sets and is the last third-generation set and Power Keepers.

== Fourth Generation Sets ==
All of the Fourth Generation sets have the words "Diamond and Pearl", "Platinum", "HeartGold SoulSilver", or "Legends" in their names; this comes from the Pokémon Diamond, Pokémon Pearl, Pokémon Platinum, Pokémon HeartGold and Pokémon SoulSilver video games present in these sets.

=== Diamond and Pearl Base Set ===
Diamond and Pearl Base Set, released in May 2007, is the 33rd set of cards in the Pokémon Trading Card Game and the 17th set released by Pokémon USA. Its symbol is a circle in an upside-down pentagon. It is a set of 130 cards. The set is the first in English-language territories to include fourth-generation Pokémon; namely, those that first featured in the Pokémon Diamond and Pearl video games on the Nintendo DS. Several new rules were introduced to the Pokémon Trading Card Game with the release of Diamond & Pearl Base Set in Japan, and several changes have been made to the format of the cards; some of these changes were included in previous card formats, and others are brand new. One such change is the introduction of Pokémon LV.X, replacing the retired Pokémon-ex and Pokémon Star cards. A Pokémon LV.X can be played to "Level Up" the Active Pokémon, and it would retain all attacks, Poké-Powers, and Poké-Bodies of the previous "Level". This is also the first set in which Pokémon classified as Poison type in the video game series would be identified as Psychic rather than Grass type, and the first set to include Pokémon cards with attacks with no Energy costs, denoted by a transparent effect where Energy requirements would normally be. Basic Dark and Steel Energy cards are introduced in this set. Three holographic Pokémon cards from this set were released in tin sets a few weeks prior to the set's launch. These tins included a Tyranitar tin featuring a Turtwig, a Camerupt tin featuring a Chimchar, and a Milotic tin featuring a Piplup.

=== Diamond and Pearl – Mysterious Treasures ===
Diamond and Pearl – Mysterious Treasures, released in August 2007, is the 34th set of cards in the Pokémon Trading Card Game and the 18th set released by Pokémon USA. Its symbol is a shiny jewel. The set introduces the Sinnoh Legendary trio, Uxie, Mesprit, and Azelf, as well as the fourth-generation Fossil Pokémon Rampardos and Bastiodon, both featured in their respective theme decks. The set also introduces "Pokémon with Item" cards, Pokémon cards with held items that work similarly to the Poké-Body mechanic. For this particular set, all held items are the berries found in the Pokémon Diamond and Pearl games. The set includes three new Pokémon LV.X and has a total of 123 cards. It is also the first set to include a secret card since EX Holon Phantoms.

=== Diamond and Pearl – Secret Wonders ===
Diamond and Pearl – Secret Wonders, released in November 2007, is the 35th set of cards in the Pokémon Trading Card Game and the 19th set released by Pokémon USA. Its symbol is a whirlpool. The set includes several more "Pokémon with Item" cards: Pokémon cards with integrated Pokémon Tools, which include specific items from the Pokémon Diamond and Pearl games, such as the Moon Stone and Reaper Cloth evolution items. The set also includes two new Pokémon LV.X. and has 132 cards.

=== Diamond and Pearl – Great Encounters ===
Diamond and Pearl – Great Encounters is the 36th set of cards in the Pokémon Trading Card Game and the 20th set released by Pokémon USA, released in February 2008, and is the second-smallest Diamond and Pearl set to date, with 106 cards. Its symbol is a triskelion inside a hexagon. The set introduces Darkrai, an event Pokémon and legendary Pokémon featured alongside Dialga and Palkia in Pokémon: The Rise of Darkrai. The set also features four more Pokémon LV.X.

=== Diamond and Pearl – Majestic Dawn ===
Diamond and Pearl – Majestic Dawn, released in May 2008, is the 37th set of cards in the Pokémon Trading Card Game and the 21st set released by Pokémon USA. Its symbol is a rising sun coming over a hill, hence the name Majestic Dawn. It is the smallest Diamond and Pearl set to date with 100 cards. This set introduces Leafeon and Glaceon as two new evolutions of Eevee and includes four more Pokémon LV.X.

=== Diamond and Pearl – Legends Awakened ===
Diamond and Pearl – Legends Awakened is the 38th set of cards of the Trading Card Game and the 22nd released by Pokémon USA, and was released in August 2008. The set reintroduces Technical Machines to the Trading Card Game and includes the last of the Pokémon card variants of Pokémon first seen in Pokémon Diamond and Pearl Video Games (excluding unreleased Shaymin and Arceus). The set includes seven Pokémon LV.X, more than any set thus far. Many great decks came out of LA LV.X cards, a prominent one being AMU. It is the fourth-largest set in the history of the TCG with 146 cards.

=== Diamond and Pearl – Stormfront ===
Diamond and Pearl – Stormfront is the 39th set of cards of the Trading Card Game and the 23rd released by Pokémon USA, and was released in November 2008. Its symbol is a circle with a lightning bolt running through it. It is a set of 100 cards. The set reintroduced Pokémon of alternate coloration (better known as shiny Pokémon) and was the first set of the Diamond and Pearl series to reprint three "classic" cards from the first Trading Card Game expansions. The set includes eight Pokémon LV.X, two of which were also released as promotional cards. It also introduced trainer cards that can be used with another one at the same time.

=== Platinum Base Set ===
Platinum Base Set is the 40th set of cards of the Trading Card Game and the 24th released by Pokémon USA. It was released on October 13, 2008, in Japan and in the United States on February 11, 2009. It introduces the never-before-seen Pokémon Shaymin and includes a new variant of Pokémon belonging to Team Galactic, called Pokémon G, which are part of a new mechanic, called "Pokémon SP". The set also includes a new mechanic called the Lost Zone, which acts as a second discard pile but one which players cannot retrieve cards from. It features two theme decks, one built around Shaymin, "Flourish", and the other around Renegade Pokémon Giratina, "Rebellion". Platinum includes six Pokémon LV.X, two of which are Shaymin (one of Land Forme and one of Sky Forme), and 127 cards in total. The set includes 6 secret cards. Two of the Pokémon LV.X were released as promotional reprints with new artwork on March 2, 2009.

=== Platinum – Rising Rivals ===
Platinum – Rising Rivals is the 41st set of cards of the Trading Card Game and the 25th released by Pokémon USA. It is a set of 111 cards not including the 112, 113 and 114 bonus pikachus & 6 secret holofoil cards of the Pokémon Rotom. It introduces Gym Leader's Pokémon ("Pokémon GL"), and Elite Four's Pokémon ("Pokémon E4"), which are new variants of Pokémon SP. It was released on December 26, 2008, in Japan. It was released in the US on May 16, 2009. The cards from this set include Luxray GL LV.X, Lucian's Assignment, Gallade E4 LV.X, and a new version of Infernape LV.X. It was not reprinted, this Infernape is now in SP form, with different attacks and a Poke-Power. Some other LV.X include Alakazam LV.X and Snorlax LV.X. It also includes some hidden rares which are remakes of original cards from the first sets. They have as much value as a LV.X. They include the original Pikachu, Surfing Pikachu, and Flying Pikachu. The main Pokémon from this set is Rotom, which has many unique forms: Wash, Mow, Fan, Heat, and Frost Rotom.

=== Platinum – Supreme Victors ===
Platinum – Supreme Victors is the 42nd set of cards of the Trading Card Game and the 26th released by Pokémon USA. It was released on March 6, 2009, in Japan and was released in the United States on August 19, 2009. It is a set of 147 cards. Its symbol is two connected upside-down triangles. This set contains Frontier Brain Pokémon ("Pokémon FB"), as well as the Champion's Pokémon ("Pokémon C"), also variants of Pokémon SP. New LV.X Pokémon, like, Rayquaza C LV.X and Charizard G LV.X are also included.

=== Platinum – Arceus ===
Platinum – Arceus is the 43rd set of cards of the Trading Card Game and the 1st released by The Pokémon Company International. Pokémon USA ceased to exist as a separate entity on April 9, 2009, when it merged with Pokémon UK to form The Pokémon Company International (TPCi).

This set contains 99 different cards. It was released on July 5, 2008, in Japan and was released in North America on November 4, 2009.

This set marks the TCG debut of the final Generation IV Pokémon, Arceus. All the Arceus Pokémon cards have a special rule printed on them that allows a deck to have any number of Pokémon with the name "Arceus", as opposed to the normal 4-per-deck rule.

Six new Pokémon LV.X were included in this expansion, three of which were different forms of Arceus LV.X, the other three being Gengar LV.X, Salamence LV.X and Tangrowth LV.X. This expansion also marked the continuation of the "Shining" Pokémon which were featured through the Platinum booster series. Each of these cards had a different collector number sequence than the other cards in the expansion, which were Bagon (SH10) Ponyta (SH11), and Shinx (SH12).

=== HeartGold & SoulSilver ===
HeartGold & SoulSilver is the 44th set of cards of the Trading Card Game. This set is based on the Pokémon video games of the same title. It has 123 cards in it plus a bonus Unknown, Alph Lithograph. It includes the new Pokémon Prime cards, which replace Lv.Xs. Pokémon Prime cards depict a close-up of the Pokémon's face, and are stronger than usual, albeit with no other gameplay restrictions. This set also features 2 Pokémon LEGEND, which are one Pokémon made up of 2 cards. They are Ho-oh and Lugia. It has an Alph Lithograph in it, allowing the player to look at the cards in the opponent's hand. This set has 3 theme decks.

=== HS–Unleashed ===
HS–Unleashed is the 45th Pokémon trading card game set and second set based on the Pokémon games, Pokémon HeartGold and SoulSilver. The set has a total of 95 cards, including Tyranitar (Prime), Steelix (Prime), Crobat (Prime), Kingdra (Prime), Lanturn (Prime), Ursaring (Prime), Entei & Raikou LEGEND, Raikou & Suicune LEGEND, and Suicune & Entei LEGEND. The set also features a Secret Rare card" Alph Lithograph. Unlike the one in the previous set, HGSS, this one allows the player to shuffle their deck. There are 4 versions of Alph Lithograph. HeartGold and SoulSilver – Unleashed is the first set to feature dual-Legend cards, which consist of two Pokémon on the same two-card LEGEND. However, these Pokémon, when Knocked Out, have the opponent take 2 Prize Cards rather than 1. The set features Chaos Control (Tyranitar) and Steel Sentinel (Steelix) decks.

=== HS–Undaunted ===
HS–Undaunted is the 46th Pokémon trading card game set and third Pokémon trading card game set based on the Pokémon games, Pokémon HeartGold and SoulSilver. The set has a total of 90 cards, including Raichu (Prime), Houndoom (Prime), Espeon (Prime), Umbreon (Prime), Scizor (Prime), Slowking (Prime), Rayquaza & Deoxys LEGEND and Kyogre & Groudon LEGEND. The set also features a Secret Rare card: Alph Lithograph. This one allows the player to return any Stadium in play to its owner's hand. HS—Undaunted continue the trend of dual-Legend cards, Legend cards depicting 2 Pokémon that allow the opponent to draw 2 prize cards when Knocked Out. The starter decks for HGSS Undaunted are Nightfall, a dark/metal type deck featuring Umbreon, and Daybreak, a grass/psychic type deck featuring Espeon. With HGSS Undaunted came out there were two changes to the Starter Deck packaging: they now contain an additional booster pack from the set as well as a cardboard deck box that can hold a 60-card unsleeved deck.

=== HS–Triumphant ===
HS–Triumphant is the 47th Pokémon trading card game set and Fourth Pokémon trading card game set based on the Pokémon games, Pokémon HeartGold and SoulSilver. The set has a total of 102 cards, including Absol (Prime), Celebi (Prime), Gengar (Prime), Electrode (Prime), Mew (Prime), Magnezone (Prime), Yanmega (Prime), Machamp (Prime), Darkrai/Cresselia LEGEND and Dialga/Palkia LEGEND. The set also features a Secret Rare card: Alph Lithograph. This one, unlike the ones in the previous sets, allows the player to look at all of their face-down prize cards. HS–Triumphant continue the trend of dual-Legend cards, Legends depicting 2 Pokémon that allow the opponent to draw 2 prize cards when Knocked Out. The starter decks for HGSS Triumphant are Royal Guard, a Psychic/Fighting type deck featuring Nidoking, and Verdant Frost, a grass/water type deck featuring Mamoswine. It is speculated to be the last Heartgold and Soulsilver set in America. The set contains cards from the Japanese set "Clash at the Summit" and the mini-set Lost Link. One card missing from the set is the Stadium "Lost World" which introduced a new win condition to the game in Japan. The card, along with the other cards missing from the Lost Link set was released in the next expansion, Call of Legends.

=== Call of Legends ===
Call of Legends is a stand-alone English set of reprints and previously unreleased cards. Contains 95 different cards. Due to the extended time period between HS–Triumphant and the release of the 5th generation of Pokémon video games this set was released as a filler set. It contains reprints from the HeartGold & SoulSilver series sets, as well as the remaining cards from the Japanese Lost Link set. In addition, it contains cards of legendary Pokémon in shiny and non-shiny forms. The shiny Pokémon are also known as Shiny Legendaries, and for example, Shiny Suicune is number SL11. There are a total of 11 shiny Legendaries.

=== Japanese Pokémon Heartgold and Soulsilver sets ===
When the Heartgold and Soulsilver Pokémon trading card lineup was released in Japan, it was done differently from in the United States. It also had an abnormally long waiting period between the first and second sets.

=== Heartgold and Soulsilver Collection ===
Heartgold and Soulsilver Collection is the first Japanese set based on the Heartgold and Soulsilver games. It has 140 cards in total, including the following special cards: Alph Lithograph, Ursaring Prime, Crobat Prime, Typhlosion Prime, Meganium Prime, Blissey Prime, Donphan Prime, Ampharos Prime, Feraligatr Prime, Lugia LEGEND, and Ho-Oh LEGEND. Starting from this set, the Trainer cards in Japan have been renamed Goods cards. It has been renamed in America as HeartGold SoulSilver, or HS.

=== Heartgold and Soulsilver special decks ===
The Heartgold and Soulsilver special decks were released in between the releases of the first and second Heartgold and Soulsilver sets. Expert Deck: Leafeon vs. Metagross is a set of two 60-card decks (120 different cards) with a CD for online play. In addition to being more powerful than most theme decks, the Leafeon and Metagross decks have special cards that weren't released in any other Japanese sets. There are also Battle Starter decks, which were released with special cards only available to their specific deck. The decks are named Offense (fire types), Defense (grass types), Speed (electric types), and Skill (water types).

=== Heartgold and Soulsilver Revived Legends ===
Heartgold and Soulsilver Revived Legends is the second Japanese set based on the Heartgold and Soulsilver games. It has 80 cards, including the following special cards: Tyranitar Prime, Steelix Prime, Lanturn Prime, Kingdra Prime, Entei & Raikou LEGEND, Suicune & Entei LEGEND, Raikou & Suicune LEGEND, and Alph Lithograph. It has been renamed HS Unleashed in the United States.

=== Lost Link Mini-Series ===
Lost Link is a mini-set that features Mew Prime, Absol Prime, Gengar Prime, Darkrai and Cresselia LEGEND, and Magnezone Prime. The set has a total of 40 cards. In Japan, it was released on April 16. Though the boosters have 8 cards rather than 11 in Japan, they cost less than regular boosters. The special feature of the series is that it includes a Stadium called Lost World, which has a revolutionary effect. However, the mini-set will not be released in the United States, but instead will be combined with the cards from the Japanese set Clash at the Summit, to make HS Triumphant, which was released in the United States in early November.

== Fifth Generation Sets ==
All of the Fifth Generation sets have the words "Black and White" in their names; this comes from the Pokémon Black and Pokémon White video games present in these sets. The first set was released on April 6, 2011, and included codes that allowed purchasers to play online with an identical deck.

Generation Set No.	Name	Release date	Details
1	Black & White	April 6, 2011	It is the first Pokémon trading card game set based on the Pokémon games, Pokémon Black and White. The set has a total of 114 cards plus one bonus pikachu, introducing 69 new Pokémon to the TCG, including special full card art versions of Reshiram and Zekrom as well as a hidden rare foil Pikachu. Starting in this set, all non-Pokémon, non-energy cards now have the "Trainer" designation. Trainers are now divided into Item (representing old trainer cards), Supporter, and Stadium (though there were no Stadium in this set). The set features "Blue Assault" (Samurott), "Green Tornado" (Serperior), and "Red Frenzy" (Emboar) starter decks.
2	Black & White–Emerging Powers	August 31, 2011	The set has a total of 98 cards, introducing 31 new Pokémon to the TCG, including special full card art versions of Thundurus and Tornadus. This set features the highly anticipated "Pokémon Catcher" Item card. The first Item card since Gust of Wind that lets a player switch their opponent's active Pokémon, without the opponent choosing the new active. The set features "Toxic Tricks" (Scolipede) and "Power Play" (Krookodile) starter decks.
3	Black & White–Noble Victories	November 16, 2011	This set introduces the final Pokémon from the 5th generation to the card game, aside from the event-exclusive Pokémon; Keldeo, Meloetta, and Genesect. It features the Victory Pokémon Victini, as well as introduces the new Fossil Pokémon, Tirtouga, and Archen. Full art cards in this set include Victini, Cobalion, Terrakion, Virizion, and the first full art Trainer card, N. The set also includes a hidden rare Meowth. The starter decks feature "Fast Daze" (Accelgor) and "Furious Knights" (Escavalier).
4	Black & White–Next Destinies	February 8, 2012	Pokémon from the previous generations were reintroduced and a new type of card, the Pokémon-EX card was introduced (with Shaymin-EX, Reshiram-EX, Kyurem-EX, Zekrom-EX, Mewtwo-EX, and Regigigas-EX). Also included are 4 Secret Rare cards, depicting cards from previous sets, but were reprinted as "shiny"; Emboar (Black & White), Chandelure (Noble Victories), Zoroark (Black & White), and Hydreigon (Noble Victories). The starter decks for this set are "Explosive Edge" (Reshiram) and "Voltage Vortex" (Zekrom).
5	Black & White–Dark Explorers	May 9, 2012	This is the second set to reintroduce Pokémon from the previous generations and Pokémon-EX cards (which are Entei-EX, Raikou-EX, Tornadus-EX, Darkrai-EX, Groudon-EX, Kyogre-EX) to the card game. There are again, 3 Secret Rare cards ("shiny") that were reprinted from earlier sets: Archeops (Noble Victories), Gardevoir (Next Destinies), and a golden Pokémon Catcher (Emerging Powers). The starter decks for this set are "Raiders" (Cofagrigus) and "Shadows" (Zoroark).
6	Black & White–Dragons Exalted	August 15, 2012	This set introduces the Dragon Pokémon type to the Trading Card Game and is the third set to reintroduce Pokémon from the previous generations. The Pokémon-EX cards in this set are Terrakion-EX, Mew-EX, Ho-Oh-EX, Registeel-EX, and the brand new Dragon type EXs: Rayquaza-EX, and Giratina-EX. Also in this set are 4 Secret Rare cards ("shiny") which were reprinted from earlier sets: Reuniclus (Black and White), Serperior (Black and White), Krookodile (Black and White), and Rayquaza (which was exclusive to the English sets). The starter theme decks are "DragonSnarl" (Hydreigon) and "DragonSpeed" (Garchomp).
6.5	Dragon Vault	October 12, 2012	A small set released midway into the Black and White era. There are no new EX cards in this set, instead containing only holo cards. Packs could only be purchased from promotional products, and no booster boxes were made of Dragon Vault. Additionally, Dragon Vault packs only contained 5 cards each, all holo, due to the small set size; 20 regular cards and 1 secret rare.
7	Black & White–Boundaries Crossed	November 2012	It is the first Pokémon trading card game set based on the games Pokémon Black 2 and White 2, and the eighth overall of the Black and White series. This set officially introduces the Pokémon; both Black and White Kyurem, Landorus in its Therian form, Meloetta, and Keldeo, and continues the trend of reintroducing Pokémon from the previous generations. The Pokémon-EX cards in this set are Celebi-EX, Keldeo-EX (in Resolute form), Cresselia-EX, Landorus-EX (in Therian form), Black Kyurem-EX, and White Kyurem-EX. A new special holofoil Item card, known as ACE SPEC cards, was also introduced starting from this set (4 of them in this set). Only 1 ACE SPEC card can be in a deck. Again, 4 Secret Rare cards ("shiny"), reprinted from earlier sets, were included in this set: Golurk (Dragons Exalted), Terrakion (Noble Victories), Altaria (Dragons Exalted), and a golden Rocky Helmet (Noble Victories), and finally, we have 3 new full-art supporters; Bianca (reprinted from Emerging Powers), Cheren (reprinted from Emerging Powers and/or Dark Explorers), and Skyla. The theme decks are "IceShock" (Black Kyurem) and "ColdFire" (White Kyurem).
8	Black & White–Plasma Storm	February 2013	This set continues reintroducing Pokémon from the previous generations. The Pokémon-EX cards in this set are Moltres-EX, Victini-EX, Articuno-EX, Zapdos-EX, Cobalion-EX, and Lugia-EX. The ACE SPEC cards returned in this set. This set focuses on Team Plasma, a villainous team that is based in the Unova Region.
9	Black & White–Plasma Freeze	May 2013	It is the tenth English, and eighth Japanese, expansion from the Black & White series, and is the second Team Plasma Set. It features Thundurus-EX, Tornadus-EX, and Deoxys-EX. A new Ace-Spec was added (rock guard). The Black and White Plasma Freeze has more than 110 cards.
10	Black & White–Plasma Blast	August 2013	It is the third Team Plasma Set in the Pokémon Black and White series. The new Pokémon-EX are Genesect-EX, Dialga-EX, Palkia-EX, Virizion-EX, Jirachi-EX, and Kyurem-EX. Plasma Blast is the first set to have only 11 Pokémon-EX Cards because there is no Full Art version of Kyurem-EX. There is an all-new Full Art Supporter which is Iris. The entire set all togetherer has 101 cards.
11	Black & White–Legendary Treasures	November 2013	It is the 11th and final release of Pokémon Black and White. Released on November 6, 2013, in the United States, this set has 115 cards plus 25 RC (“Radiant Collection”) cards. There are ten returning Pokémon-EX cards, including Mewtwo-EX, Darkrai-EX, and Keldeo-EX, and two new Pokémon-EX cards, Chandelure-EX and Excadrill-EX. The 25 “Radiant Collection” cards will have a special coating and foil patterns, in addition to having their own numbering and rarity scheme. This is the only set with actual golden Pokémon cards. The set includes Golden Reshiram and Golden Zekrom.

== Sixth Generation Sets ==
The sixth generation sets have "XY" in their names. This comes from the sixth generation video games Pokémon X and Pokémon Y.

Generation Set No.	Name	Release date	Details
0	XY–Kalos Starter Set	November 8, 2013	It featured the three starters of the Kalos Region (Chespin, Fennekin, and Froakie) with 60-card decks built around each, released on November 8, 2013, prior to the sets' release. It introduced Fairy-type cards, and the Basic Energy to go along with that, being the first new type addition after 2012's Dragon-type.
1	XY	February 5, 2014	Contains more than 140 cards, and introduces 2 all-new Mega Evolutions, and 6 new Pokémon-EX.
2	XY–Flashfire	May 7, 2014	It introduced 15 new Trainer cards, five new Pokémon-EX, and three new Mega Evolutions to the game.
3	XY–Furious Fists	August 13, 2014	It introduced 10 new Trainer cards, two new Mega Evolutions, and five new Pokémon-EX to the game.
4	XY–Phantom Forces	November 5, 2014	It brings 122 new cards to the card game, including a new mechanic called "Spirit Link" that allows Mega Pokémon to evolve without ending the player's turn. It also introduces six new Pokémon-EX cards, and two new Mega Evolutions to the game. The card "Lysandre's Trump Card" (numbered 99/119 and 118/119), was banned from all sanctioned Pokémon Organized Play events from June 15, 2015, onward. This set also released the only silver Pokémon card to every be printed in a main set, Dialga EX.
5	XY–Primal Clash	February 4, 2015	It brings 164 new cards to the card game, along with the introduction of Primal Reversions with Primal Kyogre-EX and Primal Groudon-EX, as seen in Pokémon Omega Ruby and Pokémon Alpha Sapphire. Primal Clash also introduces twelve new Pokémon-EX, such as Sharpedo-EX, Trevenant-EX, Wailord-EX, and Camerupt-EX.
5.5	Double Crisis	March 25, 2015	First special expansion set in the X and Y series of Pokémon cards. This set features many Pokémon used by Team Aqua and Team Magma in the Pokémon video games. These include the highly sought-after full arts Team Magma's Groudon EX and Team Aqua's Kyogre EX.
6	XY–Roaring Skies	May 6, 2015	It includes 110 new cards and 11 new Pokémon-EX, including 4 new Mega Evolution Pokémon, and 9 new Full Art Rare Ultra Pokémon-EX cards.
7	XY–Ancient Origins	August 12, 2015	It brings 100 new cards to the thriving trading card franchise, alongside the release of the Djinn-based Pokémon, Hoopa. Ancient Origins also introduces 14 new Pokémon-EX, including the three Secret Full Art Pokémon-EX cards of Primal Groudon-EX, Primal Kyogre-EX and Mega Rayquaza-EX, all in their respective Shiny (alternative colour palette) forms.
8	XY—BREAKthrough	November 4, 2015	This set brings 164 new cards and introduces a new type of Evolution called BREAK which gives an additional Attack or Ability to a Pokémon while retaining its previous Attacks and Ability. It also starts the 2018 legal block sets for official Pokémon TCG tournaments.
9	XY–BREAKpoint	February 3, 2016	It continues to introduce Pokémon BREAK cards, such as Greninja and Luxray. It also features Full Art Trainer cards of Misty and Skyla from previous generations.
9.5	Generations	February 22, 2016	Second special expansion set in the X and Y series of Pokémon cards. This set is a collection of some new cards and some reprints, along with the "Radiant Collection", a subset containing cards with jewels in the artworks and on the frames, along with some holo patterns across the entire card. Full arts with exclusive artwork were also included in the Radiant Collection.
10	XY–Fates Collide	May 2, 2016	Lugia and Delphox are featured as Pokémon BREAK cards, and Alakazam and Genesect as Pokémon-EX.
11	XY–Steam Siege	August 3, 2016	It is the last set to feature the card style used from "Black & White" to "XY", as the following set features the style of the original Base Set. It features the Mythical Pokémon of Kalos; Volcanion and Magearna. It contains six new Pokémon-EX, and seven new Pokémon BREAK, as well as brings back an older mechanic, dual types, which was last seen in the HS—Triumphant set.
12	XY–Evolutions	November 2, 2016	This set ushers the end of the Pokémon TCG—XY series. The cards were spiritual reprints of the Base Set cards, and also included some new Pokémon-EX and Trainer cards.

== Seventh Generation Sets ==
The seventh generation sets have Sun & Moon in their name. This comes from the seventh generation of video games Pokémon Sun and Moon.

Generation Set No.	Name	Release date	Details
1	Sun & Moon	February 3, 2017	This expansion set introduced the new mechanics "Pokémon-GX" cards and the new Alolan variants of Pokémon. It focuses on the two main Legendary Pokémon of the "Pokémon Sun and Moon" video games; Solgaleo and Lunala. It continues to introduce new Full Art Secret Rare Trainer cards and debuting the new Secret Rare basic Energy cards. It also debuted the Rainbow Rare cards, featuring a rainbow color full art card.
2	Sun & Moon–Guardians Rising	May 5, 2017	The second expansion set provides more Alolan Pokémon cards. It also provides more Pokémon-GX cards, such as Lycanroc-GX and Kommo-o-GX, and Pokémon-GX of the Guardian deities; Tapu Koko-GX and Tapu Lele-GX.
3	Sun & Moon–Burning Shadows	August 4, 2017	The third expansion set introduces more Alolan Pokémon cards and Pokémon-GX cards, such as Tapu Bulu-GX, Ho-Oh-GX, Necrozma-GX and Marshadow-GX. It also features Full Art Secret Rare Trainer cards of the Trial Captains and Team Skull members from the "Pokémon Sun and Moon" video games.
3.5	Sun & Moon–Shining Legends	October 6, 2017	Shining Legends is a special expansion set in the Sun & Moon series of Pokémon cards. It was released on October 6, 2017, however, Pokémon Center Online had already released them if players pre-ordered from the website. This set brings back the Shining mechanics from the Second Generation sets (Neo series), with the Legendary Pokémon.
4	Sun & Moon–Crimson Invasion	November 3, 2017	The fourth expansion set debuts the new Ultra Beasts as Pokémon-GX cards, such as Nihilego-GX, Buzzwole-GX and Guzzlord-GX.
5	Sun & Moon–Ultra Prism	February 2, 2018	The first English set to feature Prism Star cards. Prism star cards are limited to one of each card per deck. They go to the Lost Zone when discarded.
6	Sun & Moon–Forbidden Light	May 4, 2018	The sixth expansion of cards from the Sun & Moon Series. It contains over 130 cards, including 8 new Pokémon-GX, 5 new Prism Star cards and several Pokémon native to the Alola and Kalos regions.
7	Sun & Moon–Celestial Storm	August 3, 2018	The seventh expansion set from the Sun & Moon series contains over 160 cards, including 3 Prism Star cards, 11 new Pokémon-GX cards, 3 Ultra Beasts and 27 Trainer cards.
7.5	Dragon Majesty	September 7, 2018	Dragon Majesty is the second special expansion set released on September 7, 2018. The booster packs were sold as part of special collection boxes. The set features over 70 cards, including 6 Pokémon-GX cards, 2 Prism Star cards, and 6 full-art cards.
8	Sun & Moon–Lost Thunder	November 2, 2018	The eighth expansion set from the Sun & Moon series contains over 210 cards, including 7 Prism Star cards, 13 new Pokémon-GX cards, 4 Ultra Beasts, and more than 20 Trainer cards.
9	Sun & Moon–Team Up	February 1, 2019	The ninth expansion set from the Sun & Moon series contains over 180 cards, including the introduction of Tag Team Pokémon-GX cards, 6 new Pokémon-GX cards, 4 Prism Star cards and over 25 Trainer cards.
9.5	Detective Pikachu	March 29, 2019	Detective Pikachu is the third special expansion released on March 29, 2019. The booster packs were sold as part of special collection boxes. The set features 18 cards with artwork and attacks based on the Pokémon: Detective Pikachu film. Many cards from the set were also distributed with a foil stamp if you bought a ticket to the movie.
10	Sun & Moon–Unbroken Bonds	May 3, 2019	The tenth expansion set from the Sun & Moon series contains over 214 cards, including 7 Tag Team Pokémon-GX cards, 7 new Pokémon-GX cards and over 25 Trainer cards.
11	Sun & Moon–Unified Minds	August 2, 2019	The eleventh expansion set from the Sun & Moon series contains over 236 cards, including 8 Tag Team Pokémon-GX cards, 9 new Pokémon-GX cards, over 25 Trainer cards, and two new special energy cards.
11.5	Hidden Fates	August 23, 2019	Hidden Fates is the fourth special expansion set released on August 23, 2019. For the first time, a Tag Team Pokémon GX trio card was released featuring the legendary birds of Articuno, Moltres, and Zapdos. Also, over 75 Pokémon are featured in their shiny forms including Charizard-GX and Mewtwo-GX. The set features over 150 cards, including 1 brand new Tag Team Pokémon-GX trio, 8 new Pokémon-GX cards, 15 trainer cards, and over 75 shiny Pokémon.
12	Sun & Moon–Cosmic Eclipse	November 1, 2019	The twelfth and final expansion set from the Sun & Moon series contains 271 cards, including 9 Tag Team Pokémon-GX cards, 7 new Pokémon-GX cards, the first appearance of Tag Team Supporters, over 20 Trainer cards, and a new special energy card.

== Eighth generation sets ==
In conjunction with the launch of Pokémon Sword and Shield, a new generation of cards were released. The Japanese sets were released on December 6, 2019 within the "Premium Trainer Box Sword & Shield", and the English version was released on February 7, 2020.

Generation Set No.	Name	Release date	Details
1	Sword & Shield	February 7, 2020	It's the first set of the Sword & Shield series. With over 200 cards, it introduces the new mechanics "Pokémon-V" (that replaces the "Pokémon-GX") and "Pokémon-VMAX" cards (based on the "Gigantamax" form), as well the new Galarian variants of Pokémon. It focuses on the two main Legendary Pokémon of the Pokémon Sword and Shield video games; Zacian and Zamazenta. In the West, it introduced the regulation mark for determining card legality and is the first standard set with the D regulation mark.
2	Sword & Shield–Rebel Clash	May 1, 2020	The second expansion set from Sword & Shield series. It contains over 190 cards, including 15 new Pokémon V and seven Pokémon VMAX cards. There are 15 new trainer cards and four Special Energy cards.
3	Sword & Shield–Darkness Ablaze	August 14, 2020	The third expansion set from Sword & Shield series. It has over 189 cards, including 14 new Pokémon V and 7 Pokémon VMAX cards. There are 17 new trainer cards and three Special Energy cards.
3.5	Champion's Path	September 25, 2020	Champion's Path is the first special expansion set in the Sword & Shield series. The first boxes for this set were released on September 25, 2020. Champion's Path contains over 70 cards with 15 Pokémon V cards, three Pokémon VMAX cards, and 19 trainer cards. Pokémon announced a special energy card earlier on, but this seems to not be the case.
4	Sword & Shield–Vivid Voltage	November 13, 2020	The fourth expansion set from Sword & Shield series. It has over 185 cards, including 11 new Pokémon V and 6 new Pokémon VMAX cards. There are 16 trainer cards and four Special Energy cards. This set also internationally introduces Amazing Pokémon cards to the TCG, and there are 6 of these in the set. There are two Vivid Voltage theme decks available, Charizard and Drednaw.
4.5	Shining Fates	February 19, 2021	Shining Fates is the second special expansion set from the Sword & Shield series. This set was released on February 19, 2021. Shining Fates contains over 190 cards including more than 30 Pokémon V and VMAX cards along with more than 100 shiny Pokémon. The set was popular, but not as popular as its predecessor Hidden Fates. The set is best known for the shiny Charizard VMAX card included in the set's subset, the Shiny Vault, the most popular part of the set.
5	Sword & Shield–Battle Styles	March 19, 2021	The fifth expansion set from Sword & Shield series, it contains over 160 cards. It introduced a recurring mechanic called “Battle Styles,” which feature Single Strike and Rapid Strike styles, with emphasis on strength and chance, respectively. It is the first standard set with the E regulation mark. On March 6, 2021, the Pokémon TCG: Sword & Shield—Battle Styles Build & Battle Box was available at select retailers before the release date.
6	Sword & Shield–Chilling Reign	June 18, 2021	The sixth expansion set from the Sword & Shield series, has 198 cards plus 35 secrets for a total of 233 cards.
7	Sword & Shield–Evolving Skies	August 27, 2021	The seventh expansion set from Sword & Shield series, has 203 cards plus 34 secrets for a total of 237 cards.
7.5	Celebrations	October 8, 2021	Celebrations is the third special expansion set in the Sword & Shield series, and was released October 8, 2021. The set celebrates the 25th anniversary of the Pokémon franchise, and features lots of Legendary Pokémon, as well as V and VMAX printings of Surfing and Flying Pikachu. It features 25 new cards, as well as 25 reprints of cards from past series. Each Celebrations pack only contains four cards though, due to the set's incredibly small amount of cards.
8	Sword & Shield–Fusion Strike	November 12, 2021	The eighth expansion set from Sword & Shield series, has 264 cards plus 20 secrets for a total of 284 cards. It introduces Fusion Strike, a new Battle Style.
9	Sword & Shield–Brilliant Stars	February 25, 2022	Brilliant Stars is the ninth expansion set from Sword & Shield series. It has 172 cards, plus 14 secrets for a total of 186 numbered cards. Also included in booster packs are 30 cards from the Trainer Gallery subset, numbered separately from the main set. It introduces the new VSTAR mechanic. It is the first standard set with the F regulation mark.
10	Sword & Shield–Astral Radiance	May 27, 2022	Astral Radiance is the tenth expansion set from the Sword & Shield series, it has over 180 cards. Also included in booster packs are 30 cards from the Trainer Gallery subset, numbered separately from the main set. It introduces the new Radiant cards.
10.5	Pokémon GO	July 1, 2022	Pokémon GO is the fourth special expansion set in the Sword & Shield series, and was released on July 1, 2022. Pokémon GO contains 78 cards in the main set, including 3 Radiant Pokémon, 13 Pokémon V cards, 2 Pokémon VMAX cards, 5 Pokémon VSTAR (some of those being alternate art cards). Pokémon GO is based on the incredibly popular mobile game of the same name.
11	Sword & Shield–Lost Origin	September 9, 2022	Lost Origin is the eleventh expansion set from the Sword & Shield series, it has over 190 cards. Also included in booster packs are 30 cards from the Trainer Gallery subset.
12	Sword & Shield–Silver Tempest	November 11, 2022	Silver Tempest is the twelfth expansion set from the Sword & Shield, has 195 cards plus 20 secrets for a total of 215 cards. It is the final main expansion of the Sword & Shield Series, marking the end of the eighth generation.
12.5	Crown Zenith	January 20, 2023	Crown Zenith is the fifth special expansion from the Sword & Shield series, and was released on January 20, 2023, and is the final set of the Sword and Shield era. It contains 240 cards, with 70 of those being special art rares in a subset called the "Galarian Gallery."

== Ninth generation sets ==
With the release of Pokémon Scarlet and Violet, The Pokémon Company started releasing card sets from the Scarlet and Violet series of the Pokémon TCG. The Japanese sets Scarlet ex and Violet ex released on January 20, 2023, along with three "ex Starter Decks." The English set, Scarlet and Violet, released on March 31, 2023. The Scarlet and Violet series introduced some big changes, with Pokémon Tool cards becoming their own Trainer card group (they were previously considered Item cards), new card rarities, silver card borders, a new pack structure, which includes one holographic card and two reverse holographic cards per pack, and a booster pack price raise from $3.99 to US$4.49. The generation reintroduced Pokémon-ex (with lowercase letters) for the first time since Generation 3.

Generation Set No.	Name	Release date	Details
1	Scarlet & Violet	March 31, 2023	Scarlet & Violet was the first expansion set in the Scarlet and Violet series. It contains 198 cards, (before secret rares) and reintroduced Pokémon ex, along with adding Tera Pokémon ex, which cannot be attacked while on the bench. It also mainly features Pokémon from the Ninth Generation of games. It is the first standard set with the G regulation mark.
2	Scarlet & Violet–Paldea Evolved	June 6, 2023	Scarlet & Violet–Paldea Evolved is the second expansion set, it contains over 190 cards. The set mainly featured ex cards of the 9th Generation starter Pokémon and the Ruinous Quartet, which is a group of four new legendary Pokémon that were introduced in Gen 9.
3	Scarlet & Violet–Obsidian Flames	August 11, 2023	Scarlet & Violet–Obsidian Flames is the third expansion set released in the Scarlet & Violet series and mainly features Pokémon ex with the Terastal ability. The set is also heavily focused around Charizard, and even features a dark-type variant of the famous Pokémon.
3.5	Scarlet & Violet–151	September 22, 2023	Scarlet & Violet–151 is the first special expansion set in the Scarlet & Violet series of Pokémon cards. This set focuses on the first 151 Pokémon, and notably introduces the first Kadabra card since Skyridge.
4	Scarlet & Violet–Paradox Rift	November 3, 2023	Scarlet & Violet–Paradox Rift is the fourth expansion set released in the Scarlet & Violet series and mainly features the Ancient and Future variants, which can be either Pokémon or Trainer cards. Ancient Pokémon tend to have direct attacks that deal a large amount of damage, while being difficult to Knock Out. Future Pokémon tend to have attacks and Abilities with extra effects, allowing for craftier strategies.
4.5	Scarlet & Violet–Paldean Fates	January 26, 2024	Scarlet & Violet–Paldean Fates marks the second special expansion set in the Scarlet and Violet era. It is the third "Fates" set following Shining Fates and before that Hidden Fates. It contains over 240 cards more than 100 of which being of Shiny Pokémon with 6 hyper rare cards. It continues the theme of Ancient and Future cards and, as mentioned before, comes with the return of Shiny Pokémon.
5	Scarlet & Violet–Temporal Forces	March 22, 2024	Scarlet & Violet–Temporal Forces is the fifth expansion set in the Scarlet & Violet series and continues to concept of Ancient and Future Pokémon, including respective Trainer cards. ACE SPEC cards, originally introduced in the fifth-generation set Black & White: Boundaries Crossed in 2012, make their return to the Pokémon Trading Card Game. It is the first set with the H regulation mark.
6	Scarlet & Violet–Twilight Masquerade	May 24, 2024	Scarlet & Violet–Twilight Masquerade is the sixth expansion set in the Scarlet & Violet series. It has more Ancient and Future Pokémon, and introduces Pokémon from the Kitakami region.
6.5	Scarlet & Violet–Shrouded Fable	August 2, 2024	Scarlet & Violet–Shrouded Fable is the third special expansion set in the Scarlet & Violet series. This set focuses on the Kitakami region, most notably featuring the Loyal Three, a trio of legendary Pokémon from the Scarlet & Violet DLC: The Teal Mask: Okidogi, Munkidori, Fezandipiti. It would also have the first card released for the mythical Pokémon, Pecharunt. Booster bundles, booster packs, ETBs, and collection boxes are the current formats in which the set was distributed, continuing the exclusion of booster boxes for special sets.
7	Scarlet & Violet–Stellar Crown	September 13, 2024	Scarlet & Violet–Stellar Crown is the seventh expansion set in the Scarlet & Violet Era of the Pokémon Trading Card Game series. The expansion mainly focuses on Terastallized Pokémon, as well as various other Pokémon, characters, and settings associated with The Indigo Disk. The set features 175 cards which include 13 illustration rare Pokémon, 11 ultra rare full-art etched Pokémon ex and Supporter cards, six special illustration rare Pokémon and Supporter cards, and three hyper rare gold etched cards.
8	Scarlet & Violet–Surging Sparks	November 8, 2024	Scarlet & Violet–Surging Sparks is the eighth expansion set in the Scarlet & Violet Series of the Pokémon Trading Card Game. This set continues to introduce Stellar Tera Pokémon ex into the game, a concept first introduced in the previous Stellar Crown expansion. A running theme in this set is the Terarium, the primary setting of The Indigo Disk. It features 23 illustration rare Pokémon, 11 special illustration rare Pokémon and Supporter cards, and six hyper rare gold etched cards.
8.5	Scarlet & Violet–Prismatic Evolutions	January 17, 2025	Scarlet & Violet–Prismatic Evolutions is the fourth special expansion set in the Scarlet & Violet series, with cards that many collectors deem extremely valuable, resulting in scalping and numerous stock-outs. This set features the "eeveelutions," or evolutions of the Eevee Pokémon card, in addition to many specially illustrated, rare cards with artwork exclusive to the set. English booster boxes of this set do not exist, further contributing to the scarcity and subsequent popularity of packs that come from this set. The Prismatic Evolutions set also includes Budew's third Pokémon card variant since its initial introduction in the Diamond and Pearl card expansion.
9	Scarlet & Violet–Journey Together	March 28, 2025	Scarlet & Violet–Journey Together is the ninth expansion set in the Scarlet & Violet series. Journey Together brings the return of Trainer's Pokémon, or Pokémon that also feature a trainer from the Video Game series, Anime, or Manga. The featured trainers in Journey Together are N from Black and White, Iono from Scarlet and Violet, Lillie from Sun and Moon, and Hop, the rival character from Sword and Shield. This set also contains 11 illustration rare Pokémon, 6 Special Illustration rare Pokémon, notably no Special Illustration rare Trainers, and 3 hyper rare etched gold cards. It is the first set with the I regulation mark.
10	Scarlet & Violet–Destined Rivals	May 30, 2025	Scarlet & Violet–Destined Rivals is the tenth expansion set in the Scarlet & Violet series. This set continues the Trainer's Pokémon gimmick, featuring popular trainers with their Pokémon, including Cynthia, Ethan, Arven, Misty, Marnie, and Steven, along with Team Rocket as their primary opponent.
10.5	Scarlet & Violet–Black Bolt and White Flare	July 18, 2025	Scarlet & Violet–Black Bolt and White Flare is the fifth special expansion set in the Scarlet & Violet series. The expansion, released on July 18, 2025, features a new rarity called Black White Rare (BWR). As of August 2025, three cards are BWRs. Both sets feature Victini 171/086, Black Bolt features Zekrom ex 172/086, and White Flare features Reshiram ex 173/086.

Sets from the Pokémon Legends: Z-A video game have "Mega Evolution" in their name.

Generation Set No.	Name	Release date	Details
1	Mega Evolution	September 26, 2025	Mega Evolution is the first expansion in the Mega Evolution series. It contains 132 cards (before secret rares) and reintroduced mega Pokémon ex.
2	Mega Evolution–Phantasmal Flames	November 14, 2025	Mega Evolution–Phantasmal Flames is the second expansion in the Mega Evolution series and contains 96 cards.
2.5	Mega Evolution–Ascended Heroes	January 30, 2026	Mega Evolution–Ascended Heroes is the first special expansion in the Mega Evolution series. It is also the first set with the J regulation mark.
3	Mega Evolution–Perfect Order	March 27, 2026	Mega Evolution–Perfect Order is the third expansion in the Mega Evolution series and contains 88 cards.
4	Mega Evolution–Chaos Rising	May 22, 2026	Mega Evolution–Chaos Rising is the fourth expansion in the Mega Evolution series and contains 122 cards.
5	Mega Evolution–Pitch Black	July 17, 2026	Mega Evolution–Pitch Black is the fifth expansion in the Mega Evolution series and contains 120 cards.
6	Mega Evolution–Delta Reign	November 6, 2026	Mega Evolution–Delta Reign is the sixth expansion in the Mega Evolution series and contains 141 cards.

== Prerelease cards ==
Prerelease cards are reprints of one selected card from an expansion with a foil stamp of the set's logo stamped on the bottom right corner of the card's illustration, which previously featured a foil "PRERELEASE" stamp. There are currently 163 cards of this kind in the Pokémon Trading Card Game dating from the release of the Jungle expansion in 1999 to the release of the Scarlet and Violet expansion in 2023.

Wizards of the Coast first produced Prerelease cards when the Trading Card Game was first localized and were given to players of early test leagues. Prerelease cards were only awarded through select sites of the Pokémon League for the next three expansions before Wizards ended their production. After Pokémon USA acquired the rights to license and produce the Trading Card Game, Prerelease events were set up to coincide with the release of the upcoming expansions. In the United States, Prerelease events are held over two weekends prior to the commercial release of expansions.

Officially, there were only four Prerelease cards produced by Wizards of the Coast. These cards were Clefable (1/64) from the Jungle Expansion, Aerodactyl (1/62) from the Fossil Expansion, Dark Gyarados (8/82) from the Team Rocket Expansion, and Misty's Seadra (9/132) from the Gym Heroes Expansion. However, during the printing of the Clefable Prerelease cards, several Base Set Raichu cards were added to the printing sheet and were stamped with a foil "PRERELEASE". The error was eventually corrected and the Raichu cards were either destroyed or given to Wizards of the Coast employees. Wizards of the Coast had denied existence of the Prerelease Raichu for years until an employee released an image of the card in 2006.

== Promotional cards ==
Throughout the Trading Card Game, there have been many promotional cards released. Promotional cards have a five-pointed black star with the word "PROMO" written across it in place of an "expansion" symbol.

The first promotional set consisted of 53 cards in all with a 54th being a holographic Ancient Mew (which is not recognized as a promo card due to its nonconforming layout). The 53 cards vary between holographic and normal and encompass Pokémon and Trainer cards alike. The most famous of these is likely the card "Birthday Pikachu", for its uniqueness and scarcity. The second promotional set, called Best of Game, was also released by Wizards of the Coast. It included reverse holographic reprints of Hitmonchan and Electabuzz from the Base Set, Rocket's Hitmonchan and Rocket's Mewtwo from Gym Challenge and Professor Elm from Neo Genesis. In addition, there were four new cards: Rocket's Sneasel and Rocket's Scizor from the Pokémon*VS Japanese expansion and Dark Ivysaur and Dark Venusaur from the Pokémon Web Japanese expansion. Many were taken directly from Japanese cards, though there were a few that simply had alternate art of regular expansion cards. Most were obtainable through league or tournament play, while others were mail-in offers, or exclusive to certain retailers.

There have also been "box toppers", special or secret cards that are included at the top of the booster packs in a booster box, as well as various "jumbo" cards, Skyridge for example, approximately four times the size of a regular card and not legal in play.

Under Nintendo's publishing house, the third promotional set consisted of 40 cards. The release of these cards coincided with the Pokémon Organized Play (POP) packs and as a result, are less well documented. They were obtainable in two-card booster packs, given for winning tournaments. The fourth promotional set is based on the Diamond & Pearl era card sets with 56 total cards. The fifth promotional set is based on the Heart Gold & Soul Silver era card sets with 25 total cards. The sixth promotional set is based on the Black & White era card sets with 101 total cards. The seventh promotional set is based on the X & Y era card sets with 211 total cards. The eighth promotional set is based on the Sun & Moon era card sets with 244 total cards. The ninth promotional set is based on the Sword & Shield era card sets and has over 185 total cards. The tenth promotional set is based on the Scarlet & Violet era card sets.
