= Pokémon: Indigo League =

First season of the Pokémon animated television series

- Season 1
- Volume 1 English DVD cover
- No. of episodes: 82 (Japanese version); 80 (English version)

Release
- Original network: TV Tokyo
- Original release: April 1, 1997 – January 21, 1999

Season chronology
- Next → Adventures in the Orange Islands

External videos
- Pokémon - I Choose You! (full episode) via The Official Pokémon YouTube channel

Pokémon: Indigo League (Note: originally aired simply as Pokémon) is the first season of the Pokémon anime series and of Pokémon the Series: The Beginning, known in Japan as Pocket Monsters (ポケットモンスター, Poketto Monsutā). It originally aired in Japan on TV Tokyo from April 1, 1997, to January 21, 1999. It later aired in the United States in first-run syndication from September 7 to November 20, 1998, and on Kids' WB/The WB from February 13 to November 27, 1999, concluding with the airing of the previously unreleased episode 18 on June 24, 2000. It first aired in the United Kingdom on March 29, 1999, and in Germany and Italy in September 1999.

The season follows Ash Ketchum, a 10-year-old Pokémon Trainer and aspiring Pokémon Master from Pallet Town as he receives a Pikachu from Professor Oak and travels across the Kanto region to challenge its Pokémon League while joined by Misty and Brock.

The episodes were produced by Oriental Light and Magic, with Takeshi Shudo as head writer and Kunihiko Yuyama as chief director. Masamitsu Hidaka served as the supervising director for the series until the beginning of Pokémon: Battle Frontier.

== Episode list ==
Jap. overall	Eng. overall	No. in season	English title Japanese title	Directed by	Written by	Animation directed by	Original release date	English air date
1	1	1	"Pokémon, I Choose You!" (Pokémon! I Choose You!); Transliteration: "Pokémon! Kimi ni Kimeta!" (Japanese: ポケモン! きみにきめた!)	Directed by : Toshiaki Suzuki; Storyboarded by : Kunihiko Yuyama	Takeshi Shudō	Keishi Sakai & Sayuri Ichiishi	April 1, 1997	September 8, 1998
Ash Ketchum is finally ten years old; old enough to become a Pokémon Trainer. He wakes up late after accidentally destroying his alarm clock. He bumps into Gary Oak, grandson of the Pokémon expert, Professor Samuel Oak, who later shows Ash that all the Pokémon are gone. Ash has no choice but to take a naughty Pikachu, who will not listen to Ash because Pikachu chooses to stay outside of its Poké Ball, forcing Ash to drag it along with a rope. After many failed attempts at capturing some Pokémon, Ash throws a rock and hits a Spearow, who gets angry and calls an entire flock to chase Ash and Pikachu. They run away from the Spearow, in which Ash "borrows" a bike from a ten-year-old red-haired girl named Misty to escape, but when they cannot go any farther, Ash uses his body to shield Pikachu from the attacking Pokémon. Pikachu realizes how much Ash cares for him and uses a powerful electric attack Thunder to drive the Spearow away, destroying Misty's bicycle and severely injuring Pikachu in the process as well. Ash and Pikachu see a glimpse of Ho-Oh.
2	2	2	"Pokémon Emergency!" (Showdown! Pokémon Center!); Transliteration: "Taiketsu! Pokémon Sentā!" (Japanese: たいけつ! ポケモンセンター!)	Directed by : Osamu Inoue; Storyboarded by : Toshiaki Suzuki	Takeshi Shudō	Munekatsu Fujita	April 8, 1997	September 9, 1998
Finally arriving in Viridian City, Ash is cornered by Officer Jenny, who asks why he is carrying Pikachu instead of having it in a Poké Ball. After explaining, Jenny takes Ash to the Pokémon Center, where Nurse Joy begins treatment on the injured Pikachu. Before Pikachu's treatment finishes, Misty, the red-haired girl who Ash took the bike from, confronts Ash for destroying her bicycle, and vows to stick with Ash until he compensates her for it. The Pokémon Center is then attacked by Jessie, James, and their talking Meowth; members of Team Rocket, a crime gang seeking to steal all of the infirm Pokémon. Ash's Pikachu recovers and joins the Pokémon Center's many Pikachu. They manage to defeat Team Rocket by shocking them using Thunder Shock.
3	3	3	"Ash Catches a Pokémon" (Pokémon, I'll Get You!); Transliteration: "Pokémon Getto Da Ze!" (Japanese: ポケモン ゲットだぜ!)	Yūji Asada	Atsuhiro Tomioka	Akihiro Tamagawa	April 15, 1997	September 10, 1998
While walking through the Viridian Forest, Ash discovers and catches a Caterpie, his first caught Pokémon. Though Ash is excited, Misty is grossed out by Bug-type Pokémon, so she is repulsed by its attempts to be friends with her. At night, as Ash and Misty sleep, Caterpie shares with Pikachu its dream of evolving into a Butterfree. The next day, Ash also captures a Pidgeotto. However, Team Rocket shows up to steal Pikachu, weakening him and Pidgeotto in the process, so he reluctantly sends out Caterpie. To the surprise of Jessie and James, not to mention Ash, Caperpie's String Shot is able to defeat the Team Rocket Pokémon, including Meowth. When Misty tries to make nice with Caterpie, it evolves into a Metapod.
4	4	4	"Challenge of the Samurai" (Challenge of the Young Boy Samurai!); Transliteration: "Samurai Shōnen no Chōsen!" (Japanese: サムライしょうねんのちょうせん!)	Directed by : Minoru Ōhara; Storyboarded by : Toshiaki Suzuki	Hideki Sonoda	Masayuki Hiraoka	April 22, 1997	September 11, 1998
A Samurai challenges Ash to a battle, and it turns out to be Metapod vs. Metapod. After a short time, a swarm of Beedrill attacks, and Ash's Metapod is taken by them. After learning to be more responsible of a trainer, Ash is able to rescue his Metapod, which subsequently evolves once more into Butterfree.
5	5	5	"Showdown in Pewter City" (Battle of Nibi Gym!); Transliteration: "Nibi Jimu no Tatakai!" (Japanese: ニビジムのたたかい!)	Kiyotaka Itani	Junki Takegami	Norihiro Matsubara	April 29, 1997	September 14, 1998
Ash, Pikachu, and Misty have arrived at Pewter City, where Ash is eager to challenge Brock, the Pewter City Gym leader, to win the Boulder Badge. Brock is a strong Rock-type gym leader who easily defeats Ash. After meeting Flint, a mysterious man who sells rocks, Flint takes Ash and Pikachu to a watermill to make Pikachu stronger for the rematch, which Ash wins. It is revealed that Flint is none other than Brock's father. Afterwards, Brock decides to travel along with Ash and Misty as he wants to become world's best Pokémon Breeder. He gives all the responsibilities of his siblings to his dad.
6	6	6	"Clefairy and the Moon Stone" (Pippi and the Moon Stone); Transliteration: "Pippi to Tsuki no Ishi" (Japanese: ピッピとつきのいし)	Directed by : Yūji Asada; Storyboarded by : Toshiaki Suzuki	Atsuhiro Tomioka	Hidetoshi Otaka	May 6, 1997	September 15, 1998
Ash, Misty, Brock, and Pikachu arrive at Mt. Moon to find Team Rocket interfering with the local wildlife in hopes of finding the rare Moon Stone. With the help of Seymour the Scientist (リカオ, Rikao), the gang saves the Moon Stone and the Clefairies that guard it. Also, Brock catches a Zubat.
7	7	7	"The Water Flowers of Cerulean City" (The Underwater Flowers of Hanada City); Transliteration: "Hanada Shiti no Suichūka" (Japanese: ハナダシティのすいちゅうか)	Osamu Inoue	Yukiyoshi Ōhashi	Munekatsu Fujita	May 13, 1997	September 16, 1998
In his quest to collect Gym Badges, Ash heads for Cerulean City, intending to confront the Cerulean gym leader. For some reason, Misty expresses a desire to avoid Cerulean City and disappears along the way. Upon entering the gym, Ash and Pikachu are entranced by a synchronized swimming show being performed by three beautiful sisters, unsure if he has really found another Gym. The three sisters reveal that they are the gym leaders but have since converted the Gym into an aquarium and water show, and offer to just give Ash the Cascade Badge, but Misty appears once more, revealing that she is also one of the gym leaders and will battle Ash in lieu of her three older sisters. However, Team Rocket disrupts the battle in an attempt to steal all of the Gym's Pokémon. However, Ash and his Pokémon blast Team Rocket. The three sisters award Ash with the Cascade Badge for protecting the gym.
8	8	8	"The Path to the Pokémon League" (The Road to the Pokémon League); Transliteration: "Pokemon Rīgu e no Michi" (Japanese: ポケモンリーグへのみち)	Toshiaki Suzuki	Atsuhiro Tomioka	Takayuki Shimura	May 20, 1997	September 17, 1998
Ash sets off triumphantly for Vermilion City. Along the way, they hear of a fierce trainer named A.J. (アキラ, Akira), who has never lost a match. Full of self-confidence from his own record of ten victories in a row, Ash heads directly for the gym to battle this new opponent.
9	9	9	"The School of Hard Knocks" (Pokémon Certain Victory Manual); Transliteration: "Pokemon Hisshō Manyuaru" (Japanese: ポケモンひっしょうマニュアル)	Yūji Asada	Takeshi Shudō	Akihiro Tamagawa	May 27, 1997	September 18, 1998
As Ash searches for firewood, he happens across a young boy being bullied by five classmates gathered around him. Eavesdropping on their conversation, Ash learns that the boys are attending a preparatory school for Pokémon trainers. Graduates from the school are automatically qualified to participate in the Pokémon League without traveling around and collecting any badges. Ash, Misty, and Brock head to the school and do not agree with some of their ideas of training, something their "leader" does not take well.
10	10	10	"Bulbasaur and the Hidden Village" (Fushigidane of the Hidden Village); Transliteration: "Kakurezato no Fushigidane" (Japanese: かくれざとのフシギダネ)	Directed by : Hideki Hiroshima; Storyboarded by : Naori Hiraki	Yukiyoshi Ōhashi	Masayuki Hiraoka	June 3, 1997	September 21, 1998
Ash and friends are still lost along their way to Vermilion City. They stop by a pond for a break when they see an Oddish taking a drink. Ash and Misty try to catch it, but they are stopped by a Bulbasaur who rescues the Oddish. They continue on their journey and keep getting caught in traps, until the Bulbasaur's owner, Melanie (ミドリ, Midori), saves them and brings them back to her cabin. It turns out that she helps injured, sick, and abandoned Pokémon, and they decide to help. Meanwhile, Team Rocket decides to steal all the Pokémon, while Brock wonders if he should stay with Melanie. In the end, Melanie gives Bulbasaur to Ash, but not until Bulbasaur challenges Ash and Pikachu to a battle.
11	11	11	"Charmander – The Stray Pokémon" (The Stray Pokémon – Hitokage); Transliteration: "Hagure Pokemon, Hitokage" (Japanese: はぐれポケモンヒトカゲ)	Kiyotaka Itani	Junki Takegami	Izumi Shimura	June 10, 1997	September 22, 1998
Ash, Misty, Brock, and Pikachu come across a Charmander sitting on a rock. Ash tries to catch it, but it turns out it has a trainer and cannot be captured, so they head to the Pokémon Center, unaware that they would meet Damian (ダイスケ, Daisuke), a hotshot trainer who brags about leaving the Charmander behind on a false promise to come back for it, when he meant to abandon it for being weak. The gang hurries to rescue Charmander amidst severe weather, but Charmander returns to where he was abandoned, and eventually decides to join Ash after saving Pikachu from being abducted by Team Rocket.
12	12	12	"Here Comes the Squirtle Squad" (The Zenigame Squad Appears!); Transliteration: "Zenigame-gundan Tōjō!" (Japanese: ゼニガメぐんだんとうじょう!)	Toshiaki Suzuki	Hideki Sonoda	Keishi Sakai	June 17, 1997	September 23, 1998
Ash, Misty, Brock, and Pikachu become the victims of pranks played by a gang of Squirtle known as the Squirtle Squad. They end up falling down a hole and are even eventually captured by them. It turns out that they are working together with Team Rocket. When Pikachu is severely injured, the Squirtle lets Ash out to get medicine from town but must return soon or his friends will be trapped by the Squirtle Squad forever. In the end, the Squirtle Squad saves the town from a fire started by Team Rocket and the lead Squirtle of the squad joins Ash on his further adventures.
13	13	13	"Mystery at the Lighthouse" (Masaki's Lighthouse); Transliteration: "Masaki no Tōdai" (Japanese: マサキのとうだい)	Directed by : Hideki Hiroshima; Storyboarded by : Takaaki Ishiyama	Takeshi Shudō	Masayuki Hiraoka	June 24, 1997	September 24, 1998
When a Krabby that Ash catches disappears, he goes to a nearby lighthouse to see if it reached Professor Oak's lab. The keeper of the lighthouse is Bill, a Pokémon researcher who is searching for a mysterious Pokémon that sometimes appears by his lighthouse. Just as this mysterious Pokémon answers Bill's call and approaches the lighthouse, Team Rocket appears and tries to capture it. Injured, the Pokémon loses its trust of Bill and vanishes forever, though Bill intends to keep an eye out in case it ever appears again.
14	14	14	"Electric Shock Showdown" (Electric Shock Showdown! Kuchiba Gym); Transliteration: "Dengeki Taiketsu! Kuchiba Jimu" (Japanese: でんげきたいけつ! クチバジム)	Masamitsu Hidaka	Atsuhiro Hiraoka	Takayuki Shimura	July 1, 1997	September 25, 1998
Ash finally arrives in Vermilion City and is ready to prove that he can defeat its gym leader, Lt. Surge, along with the leader's Raichu. However, Ash discovers that many trainers nearly lost their Pokémon to defeat Lt. Surge, who taunts Ash for not evolving his Pikachu. Ash must train his Pikachu's speed to defeat Lt. Surge and win the Thunder Badge.
15	15	15	"Battle Aboard the St. Anne" (The St. Anne Battle!); Transliteration: "Santo Annu-gō no Tatakai!" (Japanese: サントアンヌごうのたたかい!)	Yūji Asada	Yukiyoshi Ōhashi	Akihiro Tamagawa	July 8, 1997	September 7, 1998 (Note: It aired in the United States as the first dubbed episode on September 7, 1998, and later aired in-sequence on September 28, 1998.); September 28, 1998
Ash wins a ticket to take a trip on a luxury cruise ship, the St. Anne. Ash enjoys the journey, even trading Butterfree for a Raticate, but feels guilty afterwards and asks for Butterfree back. However, the whole cruise is a scheme devised by Team Rocket, who plans to steal the Pokémon of all the trainers on board. During the confusion, James purchases a Magikarp from a devious salesman, under the impression it will make him rich, unaware of Magikarp's true nature. After Team Rocket's plans fail, the St. Anne is hit by a powerful storm. Ash loses his Butterfree's Poké Ball in the confusion and goes to get it, just as James tries to retrieve Magikarp's Poké Ball, and both groups are knocked unconscious while the rest of the passengers escape safely.
16	16	16	"Pokémon Shipwreck" (Pokémon Adrift); Transliteration: "Pokemon Hyōryūki" (Japanese: ポケモンひょうりゅうき)	Osamu Inoue	Junki Takegami	Masumi Etō	July 15, 1997	September 29, 1998
Ash, Misty, Brock, and Pikachu wake up aboard the St. Anne, discovering it has capsized and sank. Elsewhere, Jessie, James, and Meowth wake up as well, and in an attempt to escape only flood the area that they are in. When Ash and his friends find Team Rocket, the group decides to put their differences aside to escape safely, after an attempted battle nearly causes the ship to sink farther. After traversing the ship, they find a weak part of the hull to escape from, using Misty and Ash's water Pokémon to escape, while Team Rocket uses James' Magikarp, unaware that it cannot swim. After making it to the surface on some debris, the group discovers Team Rocket, once more, and after a day stranded, decide to eat Magikarp, only discovering that it has no meat on it. In anger, James kicks Magikarp off the raft and it evolves into Gyarados. It calls a group of other Gyarados to attack the group by forming a water cyclone, and everyone is stranded once more.
17	17	17	"Island of the Giant Pokémon" (Island of the Gigantic Pokémon!?); Transliteration: "Kyodai Pokemon no Shima!?" (Japanese: きょだいポケモンのしま!?)	Directed by : Yukio Okazaki; Storyboarded by : Masamitsu Hidaka	Takeshi Shudō	Izumi Shimura	July 22, 1997	September 30, 1998
After being hit by a Dragon Rage attack from James's newly evolved Gyarados while at sea, the humans are separated from their Pokémon on an island that is inhabited by giant Pokémon. Pikachu, Bulbasaur, Charmander, Squirtle, Meowth, Ekans, and Koffing try to make their way back to their trainers, while the trainers and their Pokémon escape the giant Pokémon, unaware that they have all landed on an island owned by Team Rocket to house a theme park dedicated to a giant robotic Pokémon.
18	18	18	"Beauty and the Beach" (Holiday at Aopulco); Transliteration: "Aopuruko no Kyūjitsu" (Japanese: アオプルコのきゅうじつ)	Toshiaki Suzuki	Hideki Sonoda	Keishi Sakai	July 29, 1997	June 24, 2000
Ash and his friends have finally arrived in Porta Vista, a beach-side tourist town. After destroying an old man's ship, they must help in the old man's business. To attempt to pay the man back faster, Misty enters a beauty contest, only to discover she is competing against Jessie and James. Note: The English dub for this episode was initially banned due to James crossdressing with inflatable breasts, among other sexual themes. It did not air until June 24, 2000 on Kids' WB, albeit with all suggestive scenes edited, after that, this episode was rerun only on August 18, 2000 and then never shown again in the United States.
19	19	19	"Tentacool & Tentacruel" (Menokurage, Dokukurage); Transliteration: "Menokurage Dokukurage" (Japanese: メノクラゲドククラゲ)	Directed by : Shigeru Ōmachi; Storyboarded by : Kazu Yokota	Atsuhiro Tomioka	Yūsaku Takeda	August 5, 1997	October 1, 1998
Stuck in Porta Vista because they missed the boat, Ash and friends sit around waiting for the next boat and witness a great explosion, later discovering that a group of Tentacool and Tentacruel are attacking the city since construction is destroying their reef. Misty manages to appease the group and catches a Horsea that was being harassed by the Tentacool.
20	20	20	"The Ghost of Maiden's Peak" (Ghost Pokémon and the Summer Festival); Transliteration: "Yūrei Pokemon to Natsumatsuri" (Japanese: ゆうれいポケモンとなつまつり)	Kiyotaka Itani	Takeshi Shudō	Takayuki Shimura	August 12, 1997	October 2, 1998
The boat that Ash and his friends arrive in the port city of Maiden's Peak to attend the Summer's End Festival. Brock and James both fall for a beautiful girl standing by the sea who disappears. Ash, Misty, and Team Rocket learn that she is the ghost of a maiden who waited for her lover to return from an ancient war and eventually turned into stone. While trying to protect Brock and James with some stickers bought from an old woman, the maiden reveals herself as the old woman, who in turn reveals herself to be Gastly, a ghost Pokémon. Ash tries to fight Gastly to release James and Brock from its spell but fails, until the sun rises and Gastly is forced to disappear. It is revealed that the ghost of the maiden actually exists and is a friend of Gastly and is still waiting for the one she loves to return.
21	21	21	"Bye Bye Butterfree" (Bye Bye Butterfree); Transliteration: "Bai Bai Batafurī" (Japanese: バイバイバタフリー)	Yūji Asada	Yukiyoshi Ōhashi	Akihiro Tamagawa	August 19, 1997	October 5, 1998
As the group continues on their way to Saffron City, they notice a flock of Butterfree out over the ocean. Brock informs Ash that it is the mating season for all of the Butterfree. Ash decides to release his Butterfree so that it can mate. However, Team Rocket has plans to steal them all. Ash's Butterfree bravely frees all the Butterfree and in the end, Ash releases it.
22	22	22	"Abra and the Psychic Showdown (Part 1)" (Casey! Psychic Showdown!); Transliteration: "Kēshii! Chōnōryoku Taiketsu!" (Japanese: ケーシィ! ちょうのうりょくたいけつ!)	Osamu Inoue	Junki Takegami	Keishi Sakai	August 26, 1997	October 6, 1998
Ash and his friends finally arrive in Saffron City, but he is warned by a strange man not to go into the Gym. Ash enters anyway to discover a strange training facility for people with psychic powers. Ash challenges and loses to Sabrina, the emotionless Saffron City gym leader, and her Abra, who evolves into Kadabra. Ash and his friends are transported into a toy box set and forced to play with a dangerous little girl. The group is rescued by the strange man who, after failing to convince Ash to give up on defeating Sabrina, gives him a tip: He may be able to beat Sabrina with a Ghost Pokémon from Lavender Town.
23	23	23	"The Tower of Terror (Part 2)" (Got It at the Pokémon Tower!); Transliteration: "Pokemon Tawā de Getto da ze!" (Japanese: ポケモンタワーでゲットだぜ!)	Directed by : Toshiaki Suzuki; Storyboarded by : Yukio Okazaki	Hideki Sonoda	Izumi Shimura	September 2, 1997	October 7, 1998
Team Rocket encounters the Ghost Pokémon in a haunted tower while setting a trap for Ash and his friends and end up getting frightened away. Ash and Pikachu enter alone since Ash's friends are afraid to go in. Inside, Ash and Pikachu are the victims of pranks by a Gastly, Haunter, and Gengar looking for playmates. After being crushed under a falling chandelier, Haunter turns Ash and Pikachu into ghosts where they have some fun, though Ash asks them to send him back after seeing Misty and Brock cry over his lifeless body. Ash and Pikachu are brought back to life and Haunter decides to follow Ash as his new Pokémon.
24	24	24	"Haunter vs. Kadabra (Part 3)" (Ghost vs. Esper!); Transliteration: "Gōsuto Tai Esupā!" (Japanese: ゴーストVSエスパー!)	Directed by : Yoshihiro Oda; Storyboarded by : Toshiaki Suzuki	Junki Takegami	Sato Yamamoto	September 9, 1997	October 8, 1998
Ash and his friends go back to Saffron City ready to try again for the Marsh Badge in the Gym. Ash asks Haunter for help to defeat Sabrina, but Haunter disappears during the match as it is not fond of battling. Brock and Misty get turned into dolls, and Ash is rescued just in time by the mysterious man. The man, who is really Sabrina's father, though Ash fails to know his identity, reveals that Sabrina has two personalities created during her childhood, one of the cold and unfeeling trainer, the other of the repressed little girl who desires friends, who also turned her mother into a doll. The only way to defeat Sabrina is to make her smile again. During the next match, Haunter suddenly appears in front of Sabrina while Kadabra and Pikachu are battling. Sabrina and her Kadabra become unable to battle after being sent into peals of laughter by Haunter, merging Sabrina's personalities back together and giving Ash the victory. Haunter chooses to stay with Sabrina, who has now become a good-natured person, and her reunited family.
25	25	25	"Primeape Goes Bananas" (Don't Get Angry, Okorizaru!); Transliteration: "Okoranai de ne Okorizaru!" (Japanese: おこらないでねオコリザル!)	Directed by : Shigeru Ōmachi; Storyboarded by : Kazu Yokota	Atsuhiro Tomioka	Yūsaku Takeda	September 16, 1997	October 9, 1998
As Ash is on his way towards Celadon City, he encounters a curious Mankey. After angering it while it was eating, the Mankey chases Ash and steals his hat. Ash tries to retrieve it but is brutally stopped by the fighting-type Pokémon's power, during which Team Rocket arrives to get Pikachu and when Mankey walks by James kicks it away and in its anger, evolves into Primeape. Ash resolves to capture Primeape instead of running.
26	26	26	"Pokémon Scent-sation!" (Erika and Kusaihana); Transliteration: "Erika to Kusaihana" (Japanese: エリカとクサイハナ)	Kiyotaka Itani	Hideki Sonoda	Takayuki Shimura	September 23, 1997	October 12, 1998
When Ash reaches the Celadon Gym, he is literally kicked out for earlier directly insulting the products of a nearby perfume shop owned by gym leader Erika, so with the help of Team Rocket (who plotted to steal Erika's special perfume), Ash sneaks into the gym disguised as a girl named Ashley. In the gym, his cover is blown by Misty, Brock, and Pikachu, but Erika grants him a battle as she is not allowed to refuse. During the battle, Team Rocket interrupts and sets the gym on fire before escaping with the perfume. After putting out the fire and rescuing Erika's Gloom, Ash is presented with the Rainbow Badge and Erika reveals that the stolen perfume was fake.
27	27	27	"Hypno's Naptime" (Sleeper and Pokémon Hypnotism!?); Transliteration: "Surīpā to Pokemon Gaeri!?" (Japanese: スリーパーとポケモンがえり!?)	Directed by : Osamu Inoue; Storyboarded by : Takaaki Ishiyama	Yukiyoshi Ōhashi	Shin'ichirō Kajiura	September 30, 1997	October 13, 1998
Ash and his friends arrive at a town where many of the town's children are disappearing. They discover that a Hypno, a hypnotic Pokémon, is responsible. Adults in the town have come to help their insomnia by being put to sleep by Hypno. However, there is a side effect, making the children think they are different Pokémon and run away and put real Pokémon to sleep. Ash stops Team Rocket from stealing Hypno and uses the Pokémon Drowzee to bring all the children and Pokémon back to normal. A useless Psyduck follows Misty around, and after she drops a Poké Ball, Psyduck activates it and captures itself, much to Misty's dismay.
28	28	28	"Pokémon Fashion Flash" (Rokon! Breeder Showdown!); Transliteration: "Rokon! Burīdā Taiketsu!" (Japanese: ロコン! ブリーダーたいけつ!)	Yūji Asada	Atsuhiro Tomioka	Akihiro Tamagawa	October 7, 1997	October 14, 1998
Team Rocket plans a scheme to steal many Pokémon by opening a grooming shop. Ash and his friends meet Susie, a famous Pokémon breeder. In the end, Brock gains a Vulpix when Susie tells him to look after it as she goes off to learn more about Pokémon breeding.
29	29	29	"The Punchy Pokémon" (Fighting Pokémon! Huge Battle!); Transliteration: "Kakutō Pokemon! Dai Batoru!" (Japanese: かくとうポケモン! だいバトル!)	Toshiaki Suzuki	Hideki Sonoda	Keishi Sakai	October 14, 1997	October 15, 1998
After meeting Rebecca (マナミ, Manami), a girl whose father, Anthony (アノキ, Anoki), is more concerned about training his fighting Pokémon Hitmonchan at the gym instead of Rebecca, Ash enters a Fighting Pokémon-only tournament with his Primeape. Team Rocket also enters and resorts to cheating, stealing another man's Hitmonlee, in order to win. After learning how much his daughter means to him and losing, Anthony promises to train Ash's Primeape, the tournament's winner, to make him stronger, so Ash gives it away and promises to return.
30	30	30	"Sparks Fly for Magnemite" (Do Coil Dream of Electric Mice!?); Transliteration: "Koiru wa Denki Nezumi no Yume o Miru ka!?" (Japanese: コイルはでんきネズミのユメをみるか!?)	Directed by : Kōji Ogawa; Storyboarded by : Yoshitaka Fujimoto	Junki Takegami	Sato Yamamoto	October 21, 1997	October 16, 1998
The group arrives in Gringy City (グンジョウシティ, Gunjō Shiti; Gunjou City) where everything is dark and gloomy. A Magnemite follows Pikachu everywhere ever since he caught a peculiar illness. Grimer and Muk block a turbine in a local power plant, which causes the power in the Pokémon Center to go out. Ash captures Muk and Pikachu is cured of his cold.
31	31	31	"Dig Those Diglett!" (Full of Digda!); Transliteration: "Diguda ga Ippai!" (Japanese: ディグダがいっぱい!)	Directed by : Shigeru Ōmachi; Storyboarded by : Kazu Yokota	Takeshi Shudō	Yūsaku Takeda	October 28, 1997	October 19, 1998
Ash finds himself among a group of Pokémon Trainers hired to protect a construction site for a dam from the interfering ground Pokémon, Diglett. The construction is shut down after it is revealed that the Diglett and Dugtrio are trying to protect their home. Meanwhile, lamenting over their lack of battle experience, Jessie's Ekans and James' Koffing evolve into Arbok and Weezing respectively.
32	32	32	"The Ninja-Poké Showdown" (Sekichiku Ninja Showdown!); Transliteration: "Sekichiku Ninja Taiketsu!" (Japanese: セキチクにんじゃたいけつ!)	Kiyotaka Itani	Yukiyoshi Ōhashi	Takayuki Shimura	November 4, 1997	October 20, 1998
The group finds a strange-looking ninja-style mansion. They explore it and encounter various traps. Soon, they discover that this is the Fuchsia Gym and Ash battles Koga, the gym leader, for the Soul Badge. When Team Rocket disrupts their battle, Misty discovers how powerful her Psyduck really is.
33	33	33	"The Flame Pokémon-athon!" (The Big Fire Pokémon Race!); Transliteration: "Honō no Pokemon Dai Rēsu!" (Japanese: ほのおのポケモンだいレース!)	Yūji Asada	Atsuhiro Tomioka	Akihiro Tamagawa	November 11, 1997	October 21, 1998
The group arrive at the Laramie Ranch where a family of ranchers, with their daughter, Lara (フウコ, Fūko) and her Ponyta, prepares for an annual Pokémon race. Ash takes over as Ponyta's rider when Lara gets her arm injured due to Team Rocket's interference. Then, Team Rocket helps a rival competitor called Dario to win the race by setting up traps for other participants. As the race continues, however, Ponyta evolves into Rapidash and wins the race.
34	34	34	"The Kangaskhan Kid" (Garura's Lullaby); Transliteration: "Garūra no Komoriuta" (Japanese: ガルーラのこもりうた)	Osamu Inoue	Junki Takegami	Masayuki Hiraoka	November 18, 1997	October 22, 1998
Ash and his friends arrive at the Safari Zone, unaware that the part they have entered is a protected reserve when an Officer Jenny disguised as Chansey nearly arrests them for poaching. They come across a wild boy named Tomo (ターサン, Tāsan; Tarsan) who leads a herd of Kangaskhan, and eventually find the boy's parents, who were searching for him since he was only three and learn that his real name is Tommy (タロウ, Tarō). Unfortunately, Tommy thinks that the Kangaskhan are his family. After battling Team Rocket, Tommy's parents also become part of the Kangaskhan family.
35	N/A	35	"The Legend of Dratini"; Transliteration: "Miniryū no Densetsu" (Japanese: ミニリュウのでんせつ)	Toshiaki Suzuki	Hideki Sonoda	Izumi Shimura	November 25, 1997	N/A
Ash and his friends get challenged by Team Rocket in seeing who can capture the most Pokémon within the Safari Zone, with Ash catching a whole herd of 30 Tauros. As soon as Ash and his friends head out Pokémon hunting, Team Rocket manages to get the drop on the game warden, Kaizer (カイザー, Kaizā) and forces him into giving up the location on where Dratini is (Dragon Valley). In the end, Ash, his friends, Team Rocket, and Kaiza end up seeing the legendary Dratini and Dragonair, with the heroes saving the day. Note: This episode was not dubbed into English due to scenes involving characters pointing guns at one another. However, the exclusion resulted in continuity errors, and guns had been featured in the English dubbed season previously and after.
36	35	36	"The Bridge Bike Gang" (Stormy Cycling Road); Transliteration: "Arashi no Saikuringu Rōdo" (Japanese: あらしのサイクリングロード)	Directed by : Shigeru Ōmachi; Storyboarded by : Kazu Yokota	Yukiyoshi Ōhashi	Yūsaku Takeda	December 2, 1997	October 23, 1998
Continuing their journey, the group came across a bridge which could be used as a shortcut to the next town. They soon discover that the bridge is too long to walk, and they would need bicycles to cross. They go to the Pokémon Center where Nurse Joy asks them to take some medicine to a sick Pokémon across the bridge. On their way, a bicycle gang appears to cause trouble and Team Rocket is helping them. When Ash and his friends decide to cross the bridge during a storm, the bicyclists realize that they are acting selflessly, and help them.
37	36	37	"Ditto's Mysterious Mansion" (Metamon and the Copycat Girl); Transliteration: "Metamon to Monomane Musume" (Japanese: メタモンとものまねむすめ)	Directed by : Kiyotaka Itani; Storyboarded by : Yoshitaka Fujimoto	Atsuhiro Tomioka	Keishi Sakai	December 9, 1997	October 26, 1998
During a storm, Ash and his friends arrive at a mysterious mansion. While there, Ash meets Duplica (イミテ, Imite), a girl who is an expert at impersonation, and she happens to own Ditto, a Pokémon that can transform into any Pokémon. However, Ditto cannot seem to figure out how to change its face, a fact that stopped Duplica's variety show. As they all try to help Ditto perfect its transformation, Team Rocket tries to steal the Ditto so it can transform into a Dratini which they can give to the boss. Note: In the first Japanese airing, the next episode preview was from EP038, and in the subsequent airings, there is no preview. However, when Kids Station re-airs this episode, the preview is from EP039.
38	N/A	38	"Electric Soldier Porygon"; Transliteration: "Dennō Senshi Porygon" (Japanese: でんのうせんしポリゴン)	Kiyotaka Itani	Junki Takegami	Takayuki Shimura	December 16, 1997	N/A
Ash and his friends arrive at Pokémon Center where the Poké Ball transfer machine has been causing problems, as the transferred Pokémon never end up at the other side. Ash and his friends decide to accompany Porygon, a computerized Pokémon, used by Professor Akihabara (秋葉原博士, Akihabara hakase) to investigate the problem, only to discover that Team Rocket and another Porygon are to blame. Note: This episode was controversial due to a scene with red and blue strobe lights causing a wave of seizures and other ill effects in viewers; as a result of the controversy, the show took a broadcast hiatus for four months. The episode has since been pulled from rotation worldwide.
39	37	39	"Pikachu's Goodbye" (Forest of Pikachu); Transliteration: "Pikachū no Mori" (Japanese: ピカチュウのもり)	Directed by : Kiyotaka Itani; Storyboarded by : Masamitsu Hidaka	Shinzō Fujita	Keishi Sakai	April 16, 1998 (Note: Aired as a double-length special.)	November 20, 1998
The group come into a forest where it is quiet and peaceful. They notice a large group of Pikachu that Ash's Pikachu tries to make friends with. After saving a young Pikachu from drowning and rescuing the herd from Team Rocket, Ash's Pikachu is welcomed among the other Pikachu as one of their own. Saddened by this sudden distance, Ash tries to leave Pikachu behind (to Misty and Brock's shock and dismay), thinking that in the long run, it is going to be better off with its own kind. As they attempt to leave the forest with Ash still standing his ground on leaving Pikachu, the three friends are surprised when Pikachu returns to them, flanked by the other wild Pikachu including the younger Pikachu it risked its life to save earlier. The episode ends with Ash and Pikachu having an emotional reunion and hugging one another while the rest of the wild Pikachu cheer for the two of them as Brock and Misty look on.
40	38	40	"The Battling Eevee Brothers" (The 4 Eievui Brothers); Transliteration: "Ībui Yon Kyōdai" (Japanese: イーブイ4きょうだい)	Osamu Inoue	Atsuhiro Tomioka	Shin'ichirō Kajiura	April 16, 1998	October 27, 1998
While traveling through the woods, the group encounters an Eevee that was apparently abandoned near a tree. They take it to its address in Stone Town and find it belongs to a little boy named Mikey (タイチ, Taichi). His three brothers are pressuring him into evolving his Eevee into one of three forms—Jolteon, Vaporeon, or Flareon-at an Evolution Party, where everyone uses Evolution Stones to evolve their Pokémon. However, the Evolution Party is disrupted by Team Rocket, and Mikey manages to use Eevee on its own to show his brothers that he does not need to evolve his beloved Eevee.
41	39	41	"Wake Up Snorlax!" (Wake Up! Kabigon!); Transliteration: "Okiro! Kabigon!" (Japanese: おきろ! カビゴン!)	Directed by : Kōji Ogawa; Storyboarded by : Toshiaki Suzuki	Yukiyoshi Ōhashi	Izumi Shimura	April 23, 1998	October 28, 1998
Ash and his friends arrive at a town having problems with their water source. It seems that a Snorlax is blocking the water path. Team Rocket plans to capture the Snorlax, but Ash and his friends find help from an unexpected source.
42	40	42	"Showdown at Dark City" (Showdown! Pokémon Gym!); Transliteration: "Taiketsu! Pokemon Jimu!" (Japanese: たいけつ! ポケモンジム!)	Directed by : Shigeru Ōmachi; Storyboarded by : Kazu Yokota	Junki Takegami	Yūsaku Takeda	April 30, 1998	October 29, 1998
Upon entering Dark City, Ash and his friends discover that Pokémon Trainers aren't welcome due to two rival Gyms who involve Ash and his friends as well as Team Rocket in their feuds to become the city's legitimate Pokémon Gym.
43	41	43	"The March of the Exeggutor Squad" (The Huge March of the Nassy Squad!); Transliteration: "Nasshī Gundan Daikōshin!" (Japanese: ナッシーぐんだんだいこうしん!)	Kiyotaka Itani	Hideki Sonoda	Sato Yamamoto	May 7, 1998	October 30, 1998
When at a carnival, Ash and his friends meet Melvin (マギー, Magī; McGee), a magician who is really losing his touch and fails in his own magic show. In his effort to get better, Melvin decides to hypnotize Ash and uses his Pokémon Exeggcute to capture loads of Exeggutor. The Exeggutor end up hypnotizing themselves and Team Rocket and almost destroy the entire carnival. The carnival owner sets a time bomb to stop the Exeggutor. Ash's Charmander uses flame attacks and Melvin successfully performs his fire magic trick to wake up the Exeggutor before they get harmed by the time bomb. After this Charmander unexpectedly evolves into Charmeleon.
44	42	44	"The Problem with Paras" (Paras and Parasect); Transliteration: "Parasu to Parasekuto" (Japanese: パラスとパラセクト)	Directed by : Toshiaki Suzuki; Storyboarded by : Yoshitaka Fujimoto	Atsuhiro Tomioka	Keishi Sakai	May 14, 1998	February 13, 1999
Having run out of medicine, Ash and his friends go to a shop in Mossgreen Village to get some healing potions. The shop's owner Cassandra (キヨミ, Kiyomi) wants her weak Paras to evolve into a Parasect so she can use Parasect's mushroom for a new kind of miracle potion. Ash, his friends, and Team Rocket all decide to help out Cassandra by training her Paras, hoping that it can evolve into Parasect. However, everything gets complicated because Ash's Charmeleon begins to disobey him! After facing its fears, Paras finally evolves after beating Charmeleon in battle.
45	43	45	"The Song of Jigglypuff" (Sing! Purin!); Transliteration: "Utatte! Purin!" (Japanese: うたって! プリン!)	Yūji Asada	Yukiyoshi Ōhashi	Akihiro Tamagawa	May 21, 1998	February 20, 1999
Ash and his friends find a Jigglypuff in the forest who is too shy to sing its hypnotic song. Brock gives Jigglypuff a fruit that heals its throat to make it able to sing, but Ash, his friends and Team Rocket fall asleep to the song, angering Jigglypuff. Team Rocket tricks Ash and his friends into giving Jigglypuff a stage to perform its song for an audience in Neon Town, whose inhabitants Team Rocket intends to steal from. Everyone falls asleep, including Ash, his friends, and Team Rocket, and a miffed Jigglypuff uses the marker hidden in its microphone to draw on everyone's sleeping faces. From this point on, Jigglypuff follows Ash around trying to sing its song to a crowd that will not fall asleep in almost every episode.
46	44	46	"Attack of the Prehistoric Pokémon" (Resurrected!? Fossil Pokémon!); Transliteration: "Fukkatsu!? Kaseki Pokemon!" (Japanese: ふっかつ!? かせきポケモン!)	Osamu Inoue	Junki Takegami	Shin'ichirō Kajiura	May 28, 1998	February 27, 1999
Arriving at a canyon to find an old-fashioned fossil hunt, Ash, Gary and the gang decide to join in. But Team Rocket arrives and intends to blow the canyon up. Ash, Pikachu, and Team Rocket fall into a pit which is full of awakened ancient Pokémon. Their only hope rests in Ash's disobeying Charmeleon who gets angry, which evolves into a powerful and yet still disobeying Charizard to defeat a raging Aerodactyl. In the end, the ancient Pokémon are sealed away once more (along with a terrified Team Rocket) and Officer Jenny dismisses the entire event as a side effect caused by Jigglypuff's singing. Ash, however, finds a rare Pokémon egg in the chaos and keeps it.
47	45	47	"A Chansey Operation" (Lucky's Clinical Records); Transliteration: "Rakkī no Karute" (Japanese: ラッキーのカルテ)	Toshiaki Suzuki	Hideki Sonoda	Junko Isaka	June 4, 1998	March 6, 1999
After Pikachu gets an apple stuck in its throat, Ash and his friends rush to a Pokémon Center, but learn that due to a traffic accident (caused by Team Rocket) that has left many Pokémon injured, they have to ask an ordinary doctor to help.
48	46	48	"Holy Matrimony!" (Gardie and Kojirou); Transliteration: "Gādi to Kojirō" (Japanese: ガーディとコジロウ)	Directed by : Kōji Ogawa; Storyboarded by : Masamitsu Hidaka	Junki Takegami	Izumi Shimura	June 11, 1998	March 13, 1999
After finding a missing person sign featuring James, Ash and his friends decide to find James and inform him of his parents's death. However, James's parents turn out to be alive, and their death was only a decoy to get him to return home to the rich Jessie-look-alike Jessebelle (ルミカ, Rumika), a girl James was arranged to marry from when he was a child. James has left because Jessebelle is terrifying, so everyone tries to save James from this fate, including James's old pet Growlithe.
49	47	49	"So Near, Yet So Farfetch'd" (Kamonegi's Easy Mark); Transliteration: "Kamonegi no Kamo" (Japanese: カモネギのカモ)	Osamu Inoue	Atsuhiro Tomioka	Shin'ichirō Kajiura	June 18, 1998	March 20, 1999
When Misty's Poké Balls are stolen by a Farfetch'd, Ash and the gang investigate to try to find the thief and get all the stolen things back.
50	48	50	"Who Gets to Keep Togepi?" (Whose Is Togepy!?); Transliteration: "Togepī wa Dare no Mono!?" (Japanese: トゲピーはだれのもの!?)	Kiyotaka Itani	Hideki Sonoda	Keishi Sakai	June 25, 1998	March 27, 1999
When the egg Ash found hatches into a brand-new Pokémon, Togepi, everyone wants to own it. They decide to have a small Pokémon Tournament. Ash, who found it, claims he should be the one to keep it. In the end, Ash wins the tournament, but since Misty was the first person Togepi saw when he hatched, he thinks she is his mother and stays with her.
51	49	51	"Bulbasaur's Mysterious Garden" (Fushigidane's Mysterious Flower Garden); Transliteration: "Fushigidane no Fushigi na Hanazono" (Japanese: フシギダネのふしぎのはなぞの)	Yūji Asada	Atsuhiro Tomioka	Akihiro Tamagawa	July 2, 1998	April 3, 1999
When Ash's Bulbasaur gets injured in a battle, it starts to feel and act different. Ash takes Bulbasaur to a Pokémon Center and is informed that Bulbasaur is just ready to evolve, coinciding with an evolution festival where Bulbasaur from around the region evolve into Ivysaur in the Mysterious Garden. Ash's Bulbasaur gets kidnapped by a group of Bulbasaur and taken to the festival against its will, but Bulbasaur refuses to evolve. When Team Rocket tries to kidnap the wild Ivysaur and their leader Venusaur, Bulbasaur masters Solar Beam to rescue the group.
52	50	52	"Princess vs. Princess" (Fierce Fighting! Pokémon Girls' Festival); Transliteration: "Gekitō! Pokemon Hinamatsuri" (Japanese: げきとう! ポケモンひなまつり)	Directed by : Shigeru Ōmachi; Storyboarded by : Kazu Yokota	Junki Takegami	Yūsaku Takeda	July 9, 1998 (Note: Aired as a double-length special.)	September 4, 1999
Misty and Jessie go all out for the Queen of the Princess Festival. After hours of shopping, they both decide to enter the Queen of the Princess Festival Battle Tournament to win the dolls they both coveted when they were children. Jessie fights Misty in the final of the Queen of the Tournament. Jessie uses the Lickitung she caught previously in the episode as her final pokemon. After eliminating three Pokémon, it is defeated by Psyduck.
53	51	53	"The Purr-fect Hero" (It's Children's Day! Everyone Come Together!); Transliteration: "Kodomo no Hi da yo! Zen'in Shūgō!" (Japanese: こどものひだよ! ぜんいんしゅうごう!)	Directed by : Kōji Ogawa; Storyboarded by : Toshiaki Suzuki	Yukiyoshi Ōhashi	Sato Yamamoto	July 9, 1998	September 11, 1999
Ash and his friends arrive at a small school on Kids' Day and let the children play with their Pokémon. One of the children, named Timmy (マナブ, Manabu), only wants to meet Meowth after being saved by a wild one from a Beedrill. Team Rocket's Meowth pretends to be his hero but is soon caught by Misty. Later, Timmy is saved again by the wild Meowth.
54	52	54	"The Case of the K-9 Caper!" (Gardie the Police Dog); Transliteration: "Keisatsuken Gādi" (Japanese: けいさつけんガーディ)	Toshiaki Suzuki	Junki Takegami	Junko Isaka	July 16, 1998	April 10, 1999
When Ash and his friends see a group of Growlithe training against a policeman posing as a robber, Ash decides for him and Pikachu to do the same training to become the best they can be. However, when Team Rocket comes to steal the Growlithe, Officer Jenny's voice gets changed, causing the Growlithe to think that Team Rocket are the Officers as they use their ears to follow command.
55	53	55	"Pokémon Paparazzi" (Shutter Chance Pikachu); Transliteration: "Shattā Chansu wa Pikachū" (Japanese: シャッターチャンスはピカチュウ)	Directed by : Shigeru Ōmachi; Storyboarded by : Kazu Yokota	Hideki Sonoda	Yūsaku Takeda	July 23, 1998	April 17, 1999
While eating Brock's Jelly doughnut, Ash hears a shutter which he thinks is a gun. It's really a camera belonging to a photographer named Todd Snap (トオル, Tōru), who was hired by Team Rocket to capture Pikachu, but he thinks they want him to capture a picture of him. After the confusion, Todd joins the group.
56	54	56	"The Ultimate Test" (Pokémon League Certification Test!?); Transliteration: "Pokemon Rīgu Kenteishiken!?" (Japanese: ポケモンけんていしけん!?)	Osamu Inoue	Atsuhiro Tomioka	Masayuki Hiraoka	July 30, 1998	April 24, 1999
While traveling, Ash notes it has been a long time since his last Badge, so Todd suggests he takes the Pokémon League Admissions Exam. Passing the exam would get him an immediate entry into the competition. But Ash, being overconfident of himself of passing the exam, fails in the first and second tests. In the third test, Team Rocket interferes the match and uses their given Pokémon to take revenge on the examiner for giving them a hard time on the first and second tests. In the end, the examiner commands their given Pokémon to attack Team Rocket instead of himself, which sends them blasting off again.
57	55	57	"The Breeding Center Secret" (The Secret of the Breeding Center!); Transliteration: "Sodate-ya no Himitsu!" (Japanese: そだてやのひみつ!)	Kiyotaka Itani	Yukiyoshi Ōhashi	Izumi Shimura	August 6, 1998	May 1, 1999
After putting Psyduck in a breeding center, Misty learns that she needs it to get some food from a generous chef. But when she goes to get it, Ash and the gang discover a diabolical plot by two other Team Rocket members, Cassidy and Butch, who are trying to steal Pokémon, and in doing so, Ash and his friends get framed by Cassidy and Butch.
58	56	58	"Riddle Me This" (Burn! Guren Gym!); Transliteration: "Moero! Guren Jimu!" (Japanese: もえろ! グレンジム!)	Directed by : Shigeru Ōmachi; Storyboarded by : Kazu Yokota	Junki Takegami	Yūsaku Takeda	August 13, 1998	September 18, 1999
After reaching Cinnabar Island, Ash, Brock, and Misty are dismayed to find that the Gym has closed due to crowds of tourists coming to the island and lack of serious trainers. Desperate for his seventh badge, Ash goes around and meets a riddle master who gives him clues about the real Gym's secret location. After finding the Gym in the island's volcano, the riddle master appears and reveals that he is actually Blaine, the gym leader Ash has been searching for. Ash begins his battle against Blaine with his first Pokémon, Squirtle who loses to Blaine's Ninetales and Charizard simply refusing to battle Blaine's Rhydon. Eventually, Pikachu wins against Rhydon, but Blaine has a secret weapon up his sleeve in the form of the Fire Pokémon, Magmar. With Pikachu's electric attacks rendered useless, Magmar pushes Pikachu closer and closer to the edge of the battlefield. The episode ends in a cliffhanger as it shows Pikachu standing, determined as Magmar's Fire Blast, the most powerful attack that Fire Pokémon have edges ever closer to the Electric Mouse.
59	57	59	"Volcanic Panic" (Decisive Battle! Guren Gym!); Transliteration: "Kessen! Guren Jimu!" (Japanese: けっせん! グレンジム!)	Yūji Asada	Junki Takegami	Masaaki Iwane	August 20, 1998	September 18, 1999
After Pikachu barely survives Magmar's Fire Blast, Ash begrudgingly forfeits the match. The next day, while he and his friends help heal Pikachu's injuries at the hot springs Team Rocket breaks into the gym and attempt to capture Magmar but end up triggering a volcano. Ash, his friends, Blaine, and their Pokémon work together and eventually triumph in preventing the volcano from blowing and destroying the island. As thanks, Blaine agrees to have a rematch with Ash. Ash's Charizard decides to battle Magmar in a one-on-one match to the surprise of Ash and his friends. After an intense battle where Ash looks set to lose, Charizard manages to turn things around by using its Seismic Toss which results in Magmar being knocked out and finally granting Ash his Volcano Badge...even though Charizard still won't listen to Ash!
60	58	60	"Beach Blank-Out Blastoise" (Kamex's Island); Transliteration: "Kamekkusu no Shima" (Japanese: カメックスのしま)	Directed by : Osamu Inoue; Storyboarded by : Takaaki Ishiyama	Atsuhiro Tomioka	Shin'ichirō Kajiura	August 27, 1998	September 20, 1999
On their way back to the mainland, Ash accidentally runs into a Wartortle that is trying to help its king Blastoise, a ruler of a small island that will not awake from its slumber. Squirtle dons his old persona as head of the Squirtle Squad to solve the case. It turns out Jigglypuff is stuck in one of Blastoise's blasters, singing its lullaby, which has caused the Blastoise to fall asleep.
61	59	61	"The Misty Mermaid" (Hanada Gym! Underwater Battle!); Transliteration: "Hanada Jimu! Suichū no Tatakai!" (Japanese: ハナダジム! すいちゅうのたたかい!)	Directed by : Yukio Okazaki; Storyboarded by : Kiyotaka Itani	Yukiyoshi Ōhashi	Hiromichi Hayashi	September 3, 1998	September 23, 1999
Upon returning to Cerulean City, Misty is asked by her older sisters to help out with a new underwater show. She decides to help for this underwater play with her Pokémon, but Team Rocket arrives and try to ruin things. At the end of the episode, Misty leaves her Starmie and Horsea with her sisters to assist in further shows.
62	60	62	"Clefairy Tales" (Pippi vs. Purin); Transliteration: "Pippi Tai Purin" (Japanese: ピッピVSプリン)	Toshiaki Suzuki	Shinzō Fujita	Izumi Shimura	September 10, 1998	September 25, 1999
In Viridian City, Ash and his friends are victims to several thefts by some Clefairy. While investigating with Mr. Oswald (ヒラタ, Hirata), they discover the Clefairy are building a spaceship.
63	61	63	"The Battle of the Badge" (Tokiwa Gym! The Last Badge!); Transliteration: "Tokiwa Jimu! Saigo no Bajji!" (Japanese: トキワジム! さいごのバッジ!)	Directed by : Shigeru Ōmachi; Storyboarded by : Kazu Yokota	Hideki Sonoda	Yūsaku Takeda	September 17, 1998	September 25, 1999
Ash goes to the Gym in Viridian City, but Gary gets in there before him and challenges the gym leader for his own satisfaction, as he has already won ten Gym Badges. The gym leader, Team Rocket's boss Giovanni, agrees to the fight, eventually using a never-before-seen Pokémon (Mewtwo), which the Pokédex cannot identify, to easily defeat Gary. Team Rocket kidnaps and tries to give Togepi to Giovanni, but Giovanni thinks it is useless. Giovanni leaves the Gym with Mewtwo to sort out an emergency and puts Jessie, James, and Meowth in charge. Ash challenges them and wins the battle, but Team Rocket refuses to give Ash the Earth Badge, his eighth and final badge. Togepi sends them blasting off when it plays with the controls, and Team Rocket drops the Earth Badge for Ash to catch.
64	62	64	"It's Mr. Mime Time!" (Barrierd of the Pokémon Circus); Transliteration: "Pokemon Sākasu no Bariyādo" (Japanese: ポケモンサーカスのバリヤード)	Osamu Inoue	Hideki Sonoda	Shin'ichirō Kajiura	September 24, 1998	September 27, 1999
Upon heading back to Pallet Town, Ash and his friends see a Mr. Mime trying to escape from a trainer who runs a circus. Unable to get the circus' overweight Mr. Mime to act, Ash and the gang have to find another one to take its place. The gang choose to dress up Ash so he can look like a Mr. Mime. Meanwhile, the Mr. Mime from earlier comes to the Ketchum residence and is mistaken by Mrs. Delia Ketchum for Ash.
65	63	65	"Holiday Hi-Jynx" (Rougela's Christmas); Transliteration: "Rūjura no Kurisumasu" (Japanese: ルージュラのクリスマス)	Yūji Asada	Hideki Sonoda	Keishi Sakai	October 5, 1998 (Note: Aired as a double-length special.)	December 11, 1999
Ash, Misty, Brock, and their Pokémon must return a lost Jynx to Santa before Christmas, with the help of a Lapras. Meanwhile, Jessie attempts to take revenge on Santa for stealing her favorite doll when she was young. Note: This episode was banned after being accused by Carole Weatherford of stereotyping African American women. This caused later episodes to be edited and banned where even a cameo was made by Jynx (e.g. "Orange Islands: Stage Fight!" and "The Mandarin Island Miss Match"). Jynx has now been re-colored to purple, not only in the anime, but also the video games. Note 2: Originally scheduled to air in Japan on December 23, 1997, the week after Cyber Soldier Porygon, but was preempted due to the broadcast hiatus that followed the airing of that episode.
66	64	66	"Snow Way Out" (Iwark as a Bivouac); Transliteration: "Iwāku de Bibāku" (Japanese: イワークでビバーク)	Directed by : Osamu Inoue; Storyboarded by : Yūji Asada	Shōji Yonemura	Shin'ichirō Kajiura	October 5, 1998	December 18, 1999
Ash and his friends are trapped in a snowstorm. Brock suggests that the group uses his Onix to create a bivouac. They are about to start when a strong gust of wind blows Pikachu away, and Ash tries to save him. After saving Pikachu who is about to fall off a cliff, Ash finds himself separated from the rest of the group. He and his other Pokémon must brave out the rest of the storm together in a cave. Note: Originally scheduled to air in Japan on January 6, 1998, but was also preempted due to the hiatus.
67	65	67	"Showdown at the Po-ké Corral" (Rival Showdown! Ōkido Laboratory); Transliteration: "Raibaru Taiketsu! Ōkido Kenkyūjo" (Japanese: ライバルたいけつ! オーキドけんきゅうじょ)	Directed by : Toshiaki Suzuki; Storyboarded by : Masamitsu Hidaka	Atsuhiro Tomioka	Izumi Shimura	October 8, 1998	September 30, 1999
Back in Pallet Town, Ash finds Gary, already there, waiting to partake in the Pokémon League. Always having a bitter rivalry with Gary, Professor Oak tells them both the meaning of Pokémon. Meanwhile, Team Rocket is trying to get inside the lab to steal the Pokémon after their headquarters is destroyed by Mewtwo.
68	66	68	"The Evolution Solution" (When Yadon Becomes Yadoran); Transliteration: "Yadon ga Yadoran ni naru Toki" (Japanese: ヤドンがヤドランになるとき)	Yūji Asada	Yukiyoshi Ōhashi	Masaaki Iwane	October 15, 1998	October 2, 1999
Ash goes to Seafoam Island to help Professor Oak to discover the mystery of how Slowpoke evolves into Slowbro. There, Professor Westwood V is also trying to solve the mystery. Jessie captures Shellder, and tries to rush a Slowpoke's evolution, forcing Psyduck to stall the evolution.
69	67	69	"The Pi-Kahuna" (Legend of the Surfing Pikachu); Transliteration: "Naminori Pikachū no Densetsu" (Japanese: なみのりピカチュウのでんせつ)	Directed by : Shigeru Ōmachi; Storyboarded by : Kazu Yokota	Shinzō Fujita	Yūsaku Takeda	October 22, 1998	October 2, 1999
Ash and his friends take some time off to go surfing. While surfing, however, Ash passes out, but is thankfully rescued by a surfer named Victor (ビンセント, Bincento; Vincent) and his blue-eyed Pikachu, Puka (マイケル, Maikeru; Michael). Victor then reveals his plans to surf a tsunami called Humungadunga (ビッグ・チューズデー, Biggu Chūzudē; Big Tuesday) and become a surfing legend.
70	68	70	"Make Room for Gloom" (Kusaihana of Botanical Garden); Transliteration: "Shokubutsuen no Kusaihana" (Japanese: しょくぶつえんのクサイハナ)	Kiyotaka Itani	Junki Takegami	Keishi Sakai	October 29, 1998	October 4, 1999
Ash goes to a large greenhouse called the Xanadu Nursery (ムラサメ植物園, Murasame shokubutsu-en; Murasame Botanical Garden) to get some fertilizer for his mother, but Bulbasaur sniffs the flowers and becomes paralyzed.
71	69	71	"Lights, Camera, Quack-tion!" (Pokémon the Movie!); Transliteration: "Pokemon za Mūbī!" (Japanese: ポケモン・ザ・ムービー!)	Directed by : Kiyotaka Itani; Storyboarded by : Toshiaki Suzuki	Shōji Yonemura	Izumi Shimura	November 5, 1998	October 8, 1999
Ash, his friends, and Team Rocket audition their Pokémon for the costarring role in a movie with an all-Pokémon cast. Misty's Psyduck wins the part by default when the other competitors are unable to handle the film's star, a prima donna Wigglytuff.
72	70	72	"Go West, Young Meowth" (Nyarth's A-I-U-E-O); Transliteration: "Nyāsu no Aiueo" (Japanese: ニャースのあいうえお)	Directed by : Toshiaki Suzuki; Storyboarded by : Kunihiko Yuyama	Takeshi Shudō	Keishi Sakai	November 12, 1998	October 9, 1999
Ash, his friends, and Delia go to Hollywood to see the premiere of the movie their Pokémon were cast in. Team Rocket follows them to find out that Meowth has history in this town; It is here where he was a member of a gang of street Meowths led by the Persian. He learned to speak and walk upright to win the heart of a female Meowth who was abandoned by her owner. Upon returning, he challenges Persian who was once his mentor for the female Meowth he thought he lost years before.
73	71	73	"To Master the Onixpected!" (Elite Four Shiba Appears!); Transliteration: "Shitennō Shiba Tōjō!" (Japanese: してんのうシバとうじょう!)	Osamu Inoue	Junki Takegami	Shin'ichirō Kajiura	November 19, 1998	October 11, 1999
After watching Elite Four member Bruno on TV, Ash and his friends decide to do training in the mountains to be as strong as Bruno. However, they meet Bruno, and he manipulates them to do some menial tasks for him. Meanwhile, a giant Onix is on a rampage.
74	72	74	"The Ancient Puzzle of Pokémopolis" (Clash! Super-Ancient Pokémon); Transliteration: "Gekitotsu! Chō Kodai Pokemon" (Japanese: げきとつ! ちょうこだいポケモン)	Kiyoshi Fukumoto	Atsuhiro Tomioka	Masaru Fukumoto	November 26, 1998	October 14, 1999
While training, Ash and his friends accidentally uncover the ruins of Pokémopolis (ポケモニア, Pokemonia), an ancient city. A giant Gengar and a giant Alakazam who were respectively trapped inside a "dark device" and a strange urn are awakened. The two start to fight one another when a giant Jigglypuff appears and puts them to sleep.
75	73	75	"Bad to the Bone!" (Garagara's Bone Club); Transliteration: "Garagara no Hone Konbō" (Japanese: ガラガラのホネこんぼう)	Yūji Asada	Yukiyoshi Ōhashi	Akihiro Tamagawa	December 3, 1998	October 16, 1999
Ash and his friends offer to help Otoshi (サイゾウ, Saizō), a trainer that is heading for the Pokémon League, to retrieve his stolen Gym Badges from Team Rocket.
76	74	76	"All Fired Up!" (Fire! The Pokémon League Opening Ceremony!); Transliteration: "Faiyā! Pokemon Rīgu Kaikaishiki!" (Japanese: ファイヤー! ポケモンリーグかいかいしき!)	Directed by : Keitarō Motonaga; Storyboarded by : Kiyotaka Itani	Hideki Sonoda	Masahiko Yoda	December 10, 1998	October 23, 1999
Ash finally reaches the Indigo Plateau, home of the Pokémon League Conference. Before the Pokémon League Indigo Plateau Conference begins, they plan on lighting a ceremonial cauldron with the flame of the Legendary Pokémon, Moltres. Ash, as a participant, is free to carry the flame but when Team Rocket steals it, the Indigo Plateau Conference may be cancelled.
77	75	77	"Round One: Begin!" (Pokémon League Begins! Water Field!); Transliteration: "Pokemon Rīgu Kaimaku! Mizu no Fīrudo!" (Japanese: ポケモンリーグかいまく! みずのフィールド!)	Directed by : Shigeru Ōmachi; Storyboarded by : Kazu Yokota	Atsuhiro Tomioka	Yūsaku Takeda	December 17, 1998	October 30, 1999
Ash enters his first match of the Indigo Plateau Conference on the water field, pitting his Krabby against Mandi the Astounding (コーム, Kōmu). During the battle, Krabby evolves into Kingler, who gives Ash the advantage to win the match and move onto the next preliminary round.
78	76	78	"Fire and Ice" (Ice Field! Blazing Battle!); Transliteration: "Kōri no Fīrudo! Honō no Tatakai!" (Japanese: こおりのフィールド! ほのおのたたかい!)	Directed by : Kiyotaka Itani; Storyboarded by : Toshiaki Suzuki	Junki Takegami	Akihiro Tamagawa	December 24, 1998	November 6, 1999
For the second round Ash battles in the rock arena. Ash's last Pokémon, Squirtle, defeats his foe's last Pokémon; Nidorino, and he, victorious, moves on to Round 3. In the third round, Ash faces a trainer named Pete Pebbleman (セイジ, Seiji) in the ice arena. Both trainers are left with two Pokémon each. Pete uses Cloyster and Arcanine. In the end, Ash is victorious, and he moves on to Round 4.
79	77	79	"The Fourth Round Rumble" (Grass Field! Unexpected Rival!); Transliteration: "Kusa no Fīrudo! Igai na Kyōteki!" (Japanese: くさのフィールド! いがいなきょうてき!)	Yūji Asada	Yukiyoshi Ōhashi	Masaaki Iwane	January 1, 1999	November 13, 1999
During the 4th Round, Gary ends up losing to a trainer named Melissa after Gary's Nidoking is defeated by Melissa's Golem. Meanwhile, Ash faces against his toughest opponent yet, a trainer named Jeanette Fisher (カオルコ, Kaoruko), who uses a Beedrill, a Scyther, and a Bellsprout. After a hard-fought battle with Bulbasaur, Pikachu and Muk, the match ends with Ash victorious, and he moves on to the 5th round, becoming one of the final sixteen members of the Indigo Plateau Conference.
80	78	80	"A Friend in Deed" (Rival Appears!); Transliteration: "Raibaru Tōjō!" (Japanese: ライバルとうじょう!)	Osamu Inoue	Shōji Yonemura	Shin'ichirō Kajiura	January 7, 1999	November 20, 1999
Ash meets a new trainer named Ritchie, who is eerily similar to Ash, including owning a Pikachu. However, Team Rocket makes another attempt to steal Ash's and Ritchie's Pokémon. Ash and Ritchie prevent Team Rocket from stealing their Pokémon. Ash discovers his next battle is against Ritchie.
81	79	81	"Friend and Foe Alike" (Sekiei Stadium! Vs. Hiroshi!); Transliteration: "Sekiei Sutajiamu! Tai Hiroshi!" (Japanese: セキエイスタジアム! VSヒロシ!)	Kiyoshi Fukumoto	Hideki Sonoda	Masaru Fukumoto	January 14, 1999	November 27, 1999
After making a promise with Ritchie that he will have the best battle of his life, Ash is lured and kidnapped by Team Rocket, who give him the offer of letting them steal Pikachu or missing his battle with Ritchie. Ash is not about to let Team Rocket make him break the promise he made with Ritchie, so he is able to eventually rescue Pikachu and get to the Indigo Stadium in time. However, Ash loses in the final stretch of his battle against Ritchie, due to his choice to send out Charizard, willfully knowing that Charizard would let Ritchie move on to the quarterfinals.
82	80	82	"Friends to the End" (Pokémon League! Final Battle!); Transliteration: "Pokemon Rīgu! Saigo no Tatakai!" (Japanese: ポケモンリーグ! さいごのたたかい!)	Directed by : Shigeru Ōmachi; Storyboarded by : Yūji Asada	Shinzō Fujita	Yūsaku Takeda	January 21, 1999	November 27, 1999
After losing to Ritchie in the fifth round because of Charizard's disobeying, Ash is moping around and annoyed that he had lost for some reason. He is convinced by Misty that he should support Ritchie who is now in the quarterfinals. However, when Ritchie loses, they both have to look inside themselves to see if they are good trainers.

== Music ==
The Japanese opening song is "Aim to Be a Pokémon Master" (めざせポケモンマスター, Mezase Pokémon Masutā) by Rika Matsumoto for all 82 episodes. The ending songs are "One Hundred Fifty-One" (ひゃくごじゅういち, Hyakugojūichi) by Unshō Ishizuka and Pokémon Kids for 27 episodes, "Meowth's Song" (ニャースのうた, Nyāsu no Uta) by Inuko Inuyama for 16 episodes, "Fantasy in My Pocket" (ポケットにファンタジー, Poketto ni Fantajī) by Sachiko Kobayashi and Juri Ihata with musical performance by the Pokémon Philharmonic Orchestra for 16 episodes and the Christmas variant for 2 episodes, "Pokémon March" (ポケモン音頭(おんど), Pokémon Ondo) by Sachiko Kobayashi, Unshō Ishizuka and Kōichi Sakaguchi with an interlude by Shimai Niitsu, "Type: Wild" (タイプ：ワイルド, Taipu: Wairudo) by Rika Matsumoto for 12 episodes, and the English opening song is "Pokémon Theme" by Jason Paige. The anime-size version serves as the ending theme for 52 episodes, while its shortened version serves as the ending theme for 26 episodes. The ending songs at the end of the episode are "Kanto Pokérap" by James "D Train" Willams and Babi Floyd for 52 episodes, 32 Pokémon on Monday thru Wednesday, 30 Pokémon on Thursday, and 24 Pokémon on Friday, "My Best Friends" by Michael Whalen during episode 18 and for 6 episodes, "Double Trouble" by Rachael Lillis, Eric Stuart and Maddie Blaustien for 5 episodes, "What Kind of Pokémon Are You?" by Joshua Tyler for 4 episodes, "Together Forever" by J.P. Hartmann for 6 episodes, "2.B.A. Master" by Russell Velázquez for 7 episodes, and "Viridian City" by Jason Paige for 4 episodes.

== Home media releases ==
The episodes of this season were originally released as a collection of 26 individual DVDs and VHS released by Viz Video and Pioneer Entertainment between December 13, 1998, and January 23, 2001.

Between 2006 and 2008, Viz Media re-released episodes of the season in three DVD compilations. The first twenty-six episodes of this season were released on DVD on November 21, 2006, with "Beauty and the Beach", being skipped. The second US season came out on November 13, 2007, with "Princess vs. Princess" and "The Purr-fect Hero" being moved onto the third part, to match the airing order. The third and final part was released on February 12, 2008.

On November 5, 2013, Viz Media and Warner Home Video re-issued the first 26 episodes on DVD with new packaging.

Viz Media and Warner Home Video released Pokémon: Indigo League – The Complete Collection on DVD in the United States on October 28, 2014. This release contains all three volumes of the series, consisting of 78 episodes in all, although this set lacks the episode "Holiday Hi-Jynx", which was banned by The Pokémon Company International in 2014 due to the controversial presence of Jynx.
