= Pokémon Origins =

2013 Japanese anime television film

- Japanese Poster for Pokémon Origins, featuring the trainers Red and Green/Blue, and the Pokémon, Charizard.

ポケットモンスター THE ORIGIN (Pokettomonsutā Ji Orijin)
- Created by: Satoshi Tajiri; Junichi Masuda
- Anime television film
- Directed by: Itsuro Kawasaki (act I); Yukio Kuroda (act II); Hideya Takahashi (act III); Daiki Tomiyasu (act IV)
- Music by: Shota Kageyama; Hiroaki Hayama
- Studio: Production I.G (episode 1); Xebec (episode 2-3); OLM (episode 4)
- Licensed by: The Pokémon Company International
- Original network: TXN (TV Tokyo), BS Japan, Kids Station
- English network: Pokémon TV
- Released: October 2, 2013
- Runtime: 90 minutes

Pokémon Origins, known in Japan as Pocket Monsters: The Origin (ポケットモンスター THE ORIGIN, Pokettomonsutā Ji Orijin), is a Japanese anime television special based on the Pokémon media franchise which follows the plot of Pokemon Red and Blue. Animation is handled by Production I.G, Xebec, and OLM, Inc., and the series is split into four parts, each directed by a different director from these studios. It was broadcast on TV Tokyo on October 2, 2013, ten days before the release of the X and Y video games, and began streaming internationally on Nintendo's Pokémon TV service from November 15, 2013 to December 2, 2013. On September 14, 2016, the first episode of the series was released for free on the official Pokémon YouTube channel and was later removed in 2017.

== Episode list ==
EP#	Title	Original air date	English air date
1	"File 1 - Red" "Repooto 1: Reddo" (レポート1 レッド)	October 2, 2013	November 15, 2013
Two young trainers, Red and Blue, (Note: Green in the Japanese version.) are called over by Professor Oak, who gives them a Pokédex, asking them to complete it with data from Pokémon all across the Kanto region. In exchange, he gives each of them a Pokémon partner, with Red choosing a Charmander and Blue choosing a Squirtle. After fighting several battles, catching wild Pokémon and acquiring data for his Pokédex along the way, Red comes up against Blue and is completely overpowered by his Squirtle. As Red feels dejected over his defeat, he meets a man who teaches him about the bond between trainers and Pokémon before directing him to a nearby town, Viridian City, where he can heal his Pokémon. Later arriving at Pewter City's Gym, he discovers the man he met before, the Gym Leader Brock, who offers to face him in a gym battle. After learning that his Fire-type Charmander is ineffective against Brock's Rock-type Geodude, Red manages to beat it with his Nidoran♂. However, Brock fights back with his Onix, who beats most of Red's Pokémon. Coming to understand the bond between trainers and Pokémon, Red manages to beat Onix with his Charmander, earning himself a Boulder Badge from Brock.
2	"File 2 - Cubone" "Repooto 2: Karakara" (レポート2 カラカラ)	October 2, 2013	November 18, 2013
After facing many more battles and earning two more Gym Badges, Red arrives in Lavender Town, where he hears many rumors about ghosts roaming around the Pokémon Tower, a Pokémon cemetery. Before heading to the tower, Red goes to a shelter for abandoned Pokémon, where he meets a girl named Reina, along with a Cubone who became orphaned after his mother, a Marowak, was killed by the nefarious Team Rocket. He learns that the owner of the shelter, Mr. Fuji, has gone by himself to the Pokémon Tower, which has been overrun by Team Rocket. Red decides to go to the tower to search for him whilst Blue, overhearing his conversation, decides to go as well. They both soon encounter a ghost, which is soon revealed by a Silph Scope that Blue obtains from Team Rocket to be the ghost of Cubone's mother. Cubone, who had run out from the shelter to come to the tower, reunites with his mother, allowing her to pass on, before helping Red drive out Team Rocket and rescue Mr. Fuji. As thanks, Mr. Fuji gives Red a Pokéflute and some mysterious stones before he resumes his journey.
3	"File 3 - Giovanni" "Repooto 3: Sakaki" (レポート3 サカキ)	October 2, 2013	November 20, 2013
After Red has obtained two more badges and evolved his Pokémon into Charizard, he and Blue encounter the secretary of the president of the Silph Company, which Team Rocket has taken over to obtain the Master Ball, a Poké Ball capable of capturing any Pokémon without fail. Red infiltrates the Silph Company, freeing all the imprisoned scientists and Pokémon, and receiving a Lapras in gratitude. Red faces Team Rocket's leader, Giovanni, who beats him with his Nidoqueen before escaping. Continuing his journey and earning more badges, Red arrives at Viridian City, where he discovers the final Gym Leader is Giovanni himself. Giovanni first sends out a Rhyhorn, who effortlessly beats most of Red's Pokémon, but Red manages to pull off a double knockout with his Hitmonlee. Red then sends his Charizard against Giovanni's Rhydon, managing to defeat it. Respecting Red's strength, Giovanni disbands Team Rocket's operations and awards Red with the final Gym Badge needed to enter the Pokémon League.
4	"File 4 - Charizard" "Repooto 4: Rizādon" (レポート4 リザードン)	October 2, 2013	November 22, 2013
Red finally arrives at the Pokémon League on the Indigo Plateau, where he battles against and defeats the Elite Four. However, he discovers that Blue has beaten him to the title of Pokémon League Champion. In order to obtain the title for himself, Red challenges Blue to a final battle. The match boils down to a showdown between Red's Charizard and Blue's Blastoise, with Charizard managing to win out. They are then visited by Professor Oak, who immortalizes Red and his Pokémon in the Pokémon League Hall of Fame. Afterwards, Red continues his journey and manages to catch all 149 known Pokémon. Upon returning home, however, Red learns that Blue was badly beaten by a mysterious Pokémon not listed among those Red encountered. Recalling a diary he encountered during his travels, Red deduces this to be an artificially made Pokémon named Mewtwo. After receiving advice from Oak about the stones Fuji had given him, Red goes to confront Mewtwo, finding it to be incredibly powerful. As both Red and Charizard become determined not to give up, one of the stones they received—revealed to be a Mega Stone called Charizardite X—begins to glow, resulting in a Mega Evolution that turns Charizard into Mega Charizard X, allowing them to defeat and capture Mewtwo. Upon realizing there is still a Mew to be found, Red becomes determined to fully complete his Pokédex.
