= Raichu =

Pokémon species

- Pokémon character
- Raichu artwork by Ken Sugimori
- First game: Pokémon Red and Blue (1996)
- Created by: Atsuko Nishida
- Designed by: Atsuko Nishida; Ken Sugimori (finalized)
- Voiced by: Various: Urara Takano Kei Shindō Fumiko Takekuma Casey Mongillo

In-universe information
- Species: Pokémon
- Type: Electric; Electric and Psychic (Alolan)

Raichu (/ˈraɪtʃuː/; Japanese: ライチュウ, Hepburn: Raichū) is a Pokémon species in Nintendo and Game Freak's Pokémon media franchise, and the evolved form of series mascot Pikachu. First introduced in the 1996 video games Pokémon Red and Blue, it was created by Atsuko Nishida at the request of lead designer Ken Sugimori, with the design finalized by Sugimori. Since Raichu's debut, it has appeared in multiple games including Pokémon Go and the Pokémon Trading Card Game, as well as various merchandise. In media related to the franchise, Raichu has been voiced by various voice actors, including Urara Takano, Kei Shindō, Fumiko Takekuma, and Casey Mongillo.

Classified as an Electric-type Pokémon, Raichu is a large orange mouse with a lightning bolt-shaped tail, and yellow sacs on its cheeks which can generate large amounts of electricity. Designed to be a stronger counterpart to Pikachu, who evolves into Raichu through the use of a "Thunder Stone" item, Raichu was initially intended to be able to evolve into 'Gorochu' before the latter was removed. A regional variant was added in Pokémon Sun and Moon called Alolan Raichu. Featuring a fluffier design with round ears and tail, it is able to levitate by riding its tail like a surfboard and is classified as both Electric- and Psychic-type. Two Mega Evolutions for Raichu, Mega Raichu X and Mega Raichu Y, were introduced in Pokémon Legends: Z-A's Mega Dimension downloadable content.

While early reactions from media outlets regarded Raichu negatively in light of Pikachu's status as the franchise's main mascot, later reception has been more favorable, praising its design. Due to it often being portrayed as Pikachu's rival in the anime adaptation of the series and in some games a form Pikachu refuses to evolve into, critics have claimed Game Freak portrayed the species in a negative light and overall damaged its appeal. This has led to further discussion on Game Freak's overemphasis on Pikachu, as well as varying interpretations of the themes in the rivalry, including concepts of self-identity and portrayals of youth in anime media.

== Conception and development ==
Raichu is a species of fictional creatures called Pokémon created for the Pokémon media franchise. Developed by Game Freak and published by Nintendo, the Japanese franchise began in 1996 with the video games Pokémon Red and Green for the Game Boy, which were later released in North America as Pokémon Red and Blue in 1998. In these games and their sequels, the player assumes the role of a Trainer whose goal is to capture and use the creatures' special abilities to combat other Pokémon. Some Pokémon can transform into stronger species through a process called evolution via various means, such as exposure to specific items. Each Pokémon has one or two elemental types, which define its advantages and disadvantages when battling other Pokémon. A major goal in each game is to complete the Pokédex, a comprehensive Pokémon encyclopedia, by capturing, evolving, and trading with other Trainers to obtain individuals from all Pokémon species.

Midway through Red and Blue's development, lead designer Ken Sugimori felt that the game needed more "cute" Pokémon and was struggling to conceive of such designs. Attributing it to his male perspective, he brought in female Game Freak staff including Atsuko Nishida to join the development team. Tasked with developing the Pikachu species and its evolutionary line, she was given specific guidelines to work with, namely its role as an Electric-type Pokémon, that it evolved twice, and that the final evolution should "look strong". Pikachu evolves into Raichu through use of the game's "Thunder Stone" item. Raichu was originally planned to evolve into a Pokémon species dubbed Gorochu, but this was cut due to cartridge space concerns. Later in the franchise, Sugimori would create a Pokémon that evolved into Pikachu named Pichu to complete the trinity. Nishida developed the original Raichu sprites using a single color identity chosen to work within the Super Game Boy's hardware limitations. Afterwards, the design was finalized by Sugimori who, towards the end of development, drew the promotional art of all the species to give them a unified look and make any last-minute changes.

=== Design ===
Nishida wanted to give Raichu's Alolan form a "soft and fluffy" appearance. She also defined Alolan Raichu's means of movement, with the Pokémon levitating on its tail and gliding on it like a surfboard.

Standing 2 feet 7 inches (79 cm) tall, Raichu is significantly taller than Pikachu, which stands at 1 ft 4 in (41 cm). Raichu is a bipedal rodent with long ears and feet but short arms. It has orange skin, a white belly, brown paws, and tan-colored soles on its feet. Its bifurcated ears are brown on the outside and yellow on the inside, and it has yellow cheek sacs. Raichu was not originally intended to be based on mice, as the mouse Pokémon Rattata already existed at this point in development, and instead the species was modeled after squirrels. Nishida stated in an interview that she was obsessed with squirrels at the time due to their "comical" movement, and had the idea to have Pikachu and Raichu store electricity in their cheeks similar to how squirrels store food. Pokémon creator Satoshi Tajiri however chose to change the species to be a type of mouse when he was designing the setting. Raichu's name comes from the Japanese kanji "rai", meaning thunder, followed by "chū", which is the Japanese onomatopoeia for a mouse's squeak.

During the development of sequel titles Pokémon Sun and Moon, "Alolan form" variants of several existing Pokémon were introduced, meant to be tied thematically to the game's region, which was modeled after Hawaii. According to game director Shigeru Ohmori, of all the regional forms introduced in the game, Raichu's was the hardest to create, as they felt the species was popular with fans of the franchise. A theme of it surfing on its tail was chosen due to the large amount of water surrounding the in-game region, a concept they had previously explored with Raichu in another game, Pokémon Stadium. Asked by Sugimori to design the form, Nishida felt that Raichu's original design was far cuter than people gave it credit for, and wanted to express this by giving Alolan Raichu a "soft and fluffy" appearance. When Sugimori inquired about the finished design, Nishida explained that the "motif behind the design was bread", a statement that confused him as he didn't understand the correlation. The development team gave the species an affinity for pancakes to better tie it to its motif, as well as to "play up that cuteness". It was given the secondary Psychic type, as well as a special ability called "Surge Surfer" that boosts its speed when it is in areas with an "Electric Terrain" attribute.

== Appearances ==
First found in Pokémon Red and Blue, Raichu has appeared in most Pokémon titles since, including every major game. In Red and Blue a Raichu is used by the Gym Leader Lt. Surge, a Trainer that acts as a boss the player must defeat to proceed. Typically, players must use a Thunder Stone item on a Pikachu to evolve it into Raichu. However, the Pikachu obtained at the start of Pokémon Yellow and Pokémon Let's Go Pikachu cannot evolve, and another Pikachu must be obtained and evolved into Raichu instead. While the regular version was omitted from the games Pokémon Sun and Moon, its Alolan form can be obtained instead. Both have appeared in the mobile game Pokémon Go and, in physical media, were in the Pokémon Trading Card Game. Outside of games, Raichu has appeared on several pieces of merchandise, including plush toys, figurines, and as promotional material with companies such as Burger King. Several of these were released as part of Pikachu-related product lines, including clothing items, USB wall chargers, and specialized plush toys designed for claw machines.

In the related anime and manga, Raichu appears as a repeated rival of protagonist Ash Ketchum's Pikachu. First appearing alongside Lt. Surge, Raichu quickly overpowers Pikachu, leaving Ash to consider evolving it. However, Pikachu rejects the Thunder Stone, and fights Raichu again. Using skills it acquired that Surge's Raichu lacked, due to the latter evolving too quickly, Pikachu defeats Raichu. Another Raichu appears in the short Pikachu's Vacation, goading Pikachu into fighting it and racing across the island they are on. In another episode, Pikachu comes into conflict with an Alolan Raichu, engaging in a race where they carry stacks of pancakes. Later in the anime series, a female Raichu is owned by Ash's friend, Goh. Raichu has been voiced by various actors, including Urara Takano, Kei Shindō, Fumiko Takekuma, and Casey Mongillo.

== Critical reception ==
Early reactions to the species were negative due to Pikachu's popularity as the series mascot, such as IGN in their "Pokémon of the Day Chick" series of articles arguing that Raichu was "loved by many and despised by more" and GamesRadar+ editor Brett Elston adding that it was "easy to forget Raichu even exists". A later retrospective of Pokémon from Red and Blue by Nintendo Life spoke more favorably of the species, with Jon Cartwright describing them as a "step up" from Pikachu. Other staff of the website agreed, such as Alex Olney who called it "hugely underrated" and ranking it higher than Pikachu, while Zion Grassl felt it was unfair to players of Pokémon Yellow to be denied the ability to evolve their Pikachu into Raichu.

Kenneth Shepard of Kotaku criticized The Pokémon Company's handling of the species, stating that they would either use Raichu as a "punching bag" or end up not using them at all. He blamed it on Raichu's debut episode in the Pokémon anime, feeling that while the episode by itself was good, it helped set the tone for how the species was perceived by the audience, with Pikachu being the superior of the two. Raichu's negative reception compounded in the Pokémon video games; while Pikachu would be given items or new forms available to it to improve its effectiveness, these were omitted from Raichu, giving players the underlying message that evolving Pikachu would be a disadvantage or, in some titles, prevent Pikachu from evolving at all. In an article for Fanbyte, Shepard further explained that Raichu, compared to other final evolution Pokémon such as Charizard or Blastoise, was treated with less recognition and added "it feels like Raichu can't get out from under its little brother's shadow, even as he towers over him".

Isaiah McCall of TheGamer held similar sentiments, stating "people worship the throne that Pikachu built, ignoring anything Raichu had to offer", and expressed his confusion at that reaction from fans. He argued that Raichu was simply a stronger counterpart to Pikachu and felt Raichu would have been far more popular if it evolved from any other Pokémon. Evan Valentine of ComicBook.com argued that while Raichu was overshadowed by its "smaller, [...] cuter" counterpart, its existence and portrayal helped give better insight to Pikachu's character in the anime. Screen Rant's Niki Fakhoori stated that despite The Pokémon Company's focus on Pikachu, Raichu was overall more effective in the franchise's competitive scene, needing less forced support and able to use a wider array of items. She further called it one of the franchise's "best designs", highlighting Raichu's "sleek" legs and "iconic" tail. In a 2022 article, she expressed her belief that the franchise abandoned the species.

Other sources have read different meanings into Pikachu's rivalry with his evolved form, such as the book La Culture de l'Enfance à l'Heure de la Mondialisation, in which author Pierre Bruno compared it to the story of David and Goliath. In the book Japanese Influence on American Children's Television, social sciences professor Gina O'Melia drew a comparison to Ash's idealized childlike state in Pikachu's refusal to evolve into Raichu and how this displayed that they drew power from their younger states respectively. The theme was something she felt was also a common trope in other anime media targeting children. Journalist Nicole Hill, in an interview with Kotaku, felt Pikachu's refusal to evolve resonated well with the LGBTQ community, acting as an example of self-expression and self-identity. On characterization, Fakhoori felt the anime's repeated portrayal of Raichu as "an ill-natured Pokémon used by unkind Trainers" significantly damaged how the species was viewed by the public, especially in light of Pikachu being emphasized as "reasonable and heroic" when the two come into conflict.

Polygon writer Allegra Frank noted that Raichu's Alolan form had proven popular with the fandom, some of which had made the connection between its design and pancakes particularly after its presentation in the Pokémon anime. Fakhoori appreciated how it maintained similar aspects to Raichu's original design, ranking Alolan Raichu as "one of the cutest alternate forms" across the Pokémon series, and added regardless of form, felt that it is "always shaped like a friend". Shepard, on the other hand, voiced disdain. While he praised the fact Raichu had finally gotten some acknowledgement, he felt it was in part the company trying to shelve the original design. Despite praising the design on its own aspects, he felt the form came across as a reminder that "if Raichu is to get any spotlight" it would be "as a kind of canvas" for new ideas instead.
