= Cubone =

Pokémon species

- Pokémon character
- Cubone artwork by Ken Sugimori
- First game: Pokémon Red and Blue (1996)
- Created by: Ken Sugimori

In-universe information
- Species: Pokémon
- Type: Ground

Cubone (/ˈkjuːboʊn/), known in Japan as Karakara (Japanese: カラカラ), is a Pokémon species in Nintendo and Game Freak's Pokémon media franchise. First introduced in the video games Pokémon Red and Blue, it has appeared in multiple games including Pokémon Go and the Pokémon Trading Card Game, as well as various merchandise. The backstory of this Pokémon has been considered tragic, as it wears the skull of its deceased mother. This story first appeared in Red and Blue and has been redone in other works, such as the Pokémon Origins anime. It has also been the subject of creepypastas and theories, most notably a theory that Cubone is the baby of the Pokémon Kangaskhan after its mother died. It served, in part, as an inspiration for the Skull Crawler creature in the film Kong: Skull Island.

== Conception and development ==
Cubone is one of a species of fictional creatures called Pokémon created for the Pokémon media franchise. Developed by Game Freak and published by Nintendo, the Japanese franchise began in 1996 with the video games Pokémon Red and Green for the Game Boy, which were later released in North America as Pokémon Red and Blue in 1998. In these games and their sequels, the player assumes the role of a Trainer whose goal is to capture and use the creatures' special abilities to combat other Pokémon. Some Pokémon can transform into stronger species through a process called evolution. This can occur via various means, such as gaining experience points or exposure to specific items. Each Pokémon has one or two elemental types, which define its advantages and disadvantages when battling other Pokémon. A major goal in each game is to complete the Pokédex, a comprehensive Pokémon encyclopedia, by capturing, evolving, and trading with other Trainers to obtain individuals of all Pokémon species.

Cubone is a small, brown, fossil-like Pokémon. It carries a bone in its hand, and wears a skull on its head. According to in-game Pokedex entries, this skull is that of its deceased mother, Marowak. It is lonely and cries by itself, with its mask being stained with tear tracks. Cubone mournfully cries, the sound echoing inside its skull. The Pokémon Mandibuzz use this crying to prey upon Cubone. Cubone who survive in the wild long enough are able to overcome and seek vengeance, primarily against Mandibuzz. Despite its skull mask reportedly coming from its mother, several pieces of media have depicted a Cubone's mother alive simultaneously with a Cubone wearing a skull. According to Satoshi Tajiri, Cubone was "born from the thought of how sad it would be for a Pokémon to die." Cubone's English name is a fusion of the words "club" or "cute" and "bone." It was originally planned to be called "Orphon" in English, but its name was finalized as Cubone. Marowak is more adept with its bone, using it as a club, and has grown more vicious. Marowak's name comes from the English words "marrow" and "whack." It was originally planned to be named Guardia, though this was changed prior to the final release. Cubone has been voiced by Rica Matsumoto in Japanese. In Pokémon Origins, Cubone is voiced by Cristina Valenzuela, while Marowak is voiced by Laura Post.

An early Pokémon scrapped from beta versions of Pokémon Red and Green visually resembles Cubone and Marowak, and is widely theorized to be related to them. It bears a resemblance to the Pokémon Kangaskhan as well as Cubone, fueling pre-existing fan theories regarding the nature of Cubone's relation to Kangaskhan.

== Appearances ==
Cubone first appears in the games Pokémon Red and Blue. In the games, it inhabits the Pokémon Tower area, a gravesite for Pokémon. Cubone can be evolved into Marowak once it attains a high enough level. In-game, a Marowak is stated to have died while protecting its child from the villainous organization Team Rocket, and it subsequently haunts the Tower. The player can defeat it in battle to put its soul at rest, allowing the player to progress up the Tower. In the remakes of Red and Blue, Pokémon: Let's Go, Pikachu! and Let's Go, Eevee!, Cubone's backstory is changed slightly. It retains the same story, adding scenes of Cubone being kidnapped by Team Rocket, rescued by the protagonist, and going to Pokémon Tower. During this time at Pokémon Tower, it gains closure by seeing its mother's spirit as it ascends to the afterlife. Cubone is then taken by the protagonist's rival, Trace, who offers to raise it. It eventually becomes a part of his team, evolving into a Marowak. Cubone appears in subsequent entries in the series, including Pokémon Gold and Silver, Pokémon Crystal, Pokémon Sword and Shield, and Pokémon Legends: Z-A. In Pokémon Sun and Moon, Cubone evolved in the game's main location of Alola can evolve into Alolan form Marowak, which have different typings and design in comparison to regular Marowak, being Fire and Ghost instead of Ground.

Cubone appears in the Pokémon Mystery Dungeon series. In Pokémon Mystery Dungeon: Rescue Team DX, it is one of the playable characters the player can select. The Pokémon Origins anime series features Cubone and Marowak, and goes into greater depth on the backstory of the Cubone and Marowak that appear in Red and Blue. It also appeared in the film Detective Pikachu, where protagonist Tim Goodman attempted to capture it at the start of the film, only to fail. Cubone appears alongside Snorlax in a series of shorts titled The Adventures of Snorlax & Cubone. Cubone appears in the Pokémon Trading Card Game, first appearing in the "Jungle" set of cards. Its first card was designed by artist Mitsuhiro Arita, who aimed to make his cards express the idea that "that they're living creatures, that they're doing something, they're feeling something." In the Pokémon TCG: Scarlet & Violet—151 expansion set, Cubone was featured in a card based on the Jungle set.

Cubone has received multiple pieces of merchandise, including a plush of Charmander designed to resemble it, as well as a plush with a removable skull.

== Critical reception ==
Cubone has received generally positive reception, noted as a particularly sad and creepy Pokémon due to its backstory. Despite finding its backstory and the concept behind its design sad, Comic Book Resources writer Katie Schutze found its design cute. As part of IGN's Pokémon of the Day series, one of its writers discussed how much she loves it and how cute it is. She stated that, despite lacking in some ways mechanically, she cannot help but adore Cubone due in part to how sentimental its story is. Destructoid writer Ben Davis remarked how Cubone was always a staple in his team, stating that it was his favorite. He found Marowak cool, but felt that it had less charm than Cubone, so he never evolved it. When he played Red and Blue, he imagined that the Cubone he caught was the one whose mother haunted Pokémon Tower, wanting to be able to be there for it. According to Kong: Skull Island director Jordan Vogt-Roberts, Cubone was the inspiration for the "Skull Crawler" creature. He noted that they started from the design used in the original 1933 film King Kong, ultimately creating a creature with a "bone-white face" and "black, scaly skin," realizing after the fact that Cubone had inspired the design. He exclaimed how much he loved Cubone, as well as remarking about how sad a story it had.

Cubone's relationship with its mother has been the subject of discussion by critics. Fanbyte writer George Yang discussed how Marowak reminded him of his upbringing as a Chinese-American, specifically in how the Marowak that gave its life protecting its child. He discussed his feelings that Asian immigrant families will do anything for their children, and that this resonated with him through Marowak's sacrifice. TheGamer writer Stacey Henley felt that it was one of the "earliest, greatest narrative moments" in Pokémon, arguing that this led to its story being featured in Pokémon Origins. In particular, the pair's appearance in Pokémon: Let's Go, Pikachu! and Let's Go, Eevee! has received praise. NetEase staff complimented the depiction of the scene between Cubone and its mother in these games, discussing how sad the scene was for many children back in Red and Blue. They felt it was the most touching scene in the game, adding that it made the depressing scene in the original games more loving. Pocket Tactics writer Nathan Ellingsworth stated that this scene made him cry, and that it was among his most memorable moments in the franchise. Bloody Disgusting writer Cian Maher felt that the changes made to Cubone's story were enough to make a big difference, feeling that the staff gave Cubone's story "some real love" and described it as "touching and bittersweet in the most heartfelt way." He appreciated that they gave more focus to Cubone in the story. Author Matt Coward-Gibbs discussed the presentation of Marowak and how its departure is handled, noting how resolving the situation through helping the Marowak find peace through reuniting it with Cubone demonstrated how the games depict a ghost as a way to heal instead of simply being a violent ghost to fight. He felt that it was an "emotional highpoint" for the games, and would be at home in a game whose premise centered around death.

Due to Cubone's backstory, it has been the subject of multiple creepypastas, with the glitch Pokémon "M" connected to it, Marowak, and Kangaskhan by theorists and creepypasta authors. A well-known fan theory exists that suggest that Kangaskhan is Cubone's dead mother, and the baby in Kangaskhan's pouch evolves into a Cubone, believing that the glitch Pokémon MissingNo. is connected to them. Theorists argue that they have visual similarities, justifying the theory. It is also theorized that Cubone eventually evolves into Kangaskhan. GamesRadar+ writer Ashley Reed argued that this theory was credible due in part to the similarities between Cubone and a baby Kangaskhan, as well as the fact that both Cubone and Kangaskhan have a "uniquely strong mother-child connection." It is speculated that this idea was dropped due to being too dark. Another theory suggests that Cubone was a baby Charmander whose parent died, with the argument being that Cubone's plush with a removable helmet bore a "suspiciously" similar design to Charmander. Part of the theory involved the idea that Alolan Marowak's Fire type may be due to this claimed connection.
