= Hometown Story =

2013 video game

- Developers: Hyde, Inc. Toybox Inc.
- Publishers: NA: Natsume Inc.; JP: Spike Chunsoft; PAL: Rising Star Games
- Director: Yasuhiro Wada
- Producer: Yasuhiro Wada
- Designers: Satoshi Hirano; Genki Kimura
- Artist: Atsuko Nishida
- Writer: Mayu Sakura
- Composers: Nobuo Uematsu; Tsutomu Narita
- Platforms: Nintendo 3DS, iOS
- Release: 3DS: NA: October 22, 2013; JP: December 12, 2013; EU: May 12, 2014; AU: July 24, 2014; iOS; June 10, 2014
- Genres: Simulation, role-playing
- Mode: Single-player

Hometown Story (ホームタウンストーリー, Hōmutaun Sutōrī) is a 2013 life-simulation video game for the Nintendo 3DS directed by Yasuhiro Wada, produced by Toybox Inc. and distributed by Natsume Inc. for North America, Rising Star Games for Europe, and Spike Chunsoft for Japan. It was released for iOS on June 10, 2014 under the name Hometown Story Pocket.

== Gameplay ==
The main character is in charge of running a shop inherited from their deceased grandmother. The player is capable of arranging and stocking the shelves of their shop to their preference and can eventually expand on the size of the shop. In a similar vein to the Harvest Moon series the player is able to interact and befriend various townspeople. The town that the player resides in will consist of ten people at first and eventually build its way to one hundred non-player characters that the player can meet depending on their actions over the course of the story.

== Plot ==
The player receives a letter that directs them back to the village from where they grew up. Returning there, they find a shop that was once owned by their grandmother. Inside, they meet Pochica, a flying mouse-like sprite who is a friend of the player's grandmother, who has passed away. Pochica requests for the player to take over the shop. As the player runs the shop and interacts with the villagers (including a talking scarecrow, a young dragon, and the Harvest God), they also assist people with their various problems by selling them things that they need.

== Development ==
The game went under the codename of "Project Happiness" and was described as being a game to spread happiness. Wada stated that the game would take place within the Harvest Moon universe, but would be an overall different experience. The game was released for the Nintendo 3DS in 2013, and was supposed to be released for iOS on the same year, but it was delayed to June 10, 2014. However, the iOS version does not include the entire content of the game, because Wada wanted it to be a more compact experience. The 3DS version was released on October 22, 2013 in North America. Rising Star Games published the same handheld version in Europe May 2014, as the creator Yasuhiro Wada confirmed during Gamescom.

It was featured at E3 2013.

== Reception ==
Reception

Aggregate score
Aggregator	Score
Metacritic	47/100

Review scores
Publication	Score
Famitsu	30/40
Game Informer	6/10
GamesMaster	48%
IGN	5/10
Nintendo Life	5/10
Nintendo World Report	4/10
Official Nintendo Magazine	50%
Pocket Gamer	(iOS) 3.5/5 (3DS) 3/5
RPGamer	1/5
USgamer	2/5

The 3DS version received "generally unfavorable reviews" according to the review aggregation website Metacritic. IGN praised the graphics and soundtrack, but noted that the unclear conditions to unlock cutscenes are frustrating, as well as the controls. In Japan, however, Famitsu gave it a score of one eight, two sevens, and one eight for a total of 30 out of 40.
