= Bulbasaur =

Pokémon species

- Pokémon character
- Bulbasaur artwork by Ken Sugimori
- First appearance: Pokémon Red and Blue (February 27, 1996)
- Created by: Atsuko Nishida
- Designed by: Atsuko Nishida; Ken Sugimori (finalized)
- Voiced by: English: Tara Sands Michele Knotz; Japanese: Megumi Hayashibara

In-universe information
- Species: Pokémon
- Type: Grass and Poison

Bulbasaur (/ˈbʊlbəsɔːr/), known as Fushigidane (Japanese: フシギダネ) in Japan, is a fictional Pokémon species in Nintendo and Game Freak's Pokémon franchise. First introduced in the video games Pokémon Red and Blue, it was created by Atsuko Nishida with the design finalized by Ken Sugimori. Since Bulbasaur's debut, it has appeared in multiple games including Pokémon Go and the Pokémon Trading Card Game, as well as various merchandise and the 1996 anime. In media related to the franchise, Bulbasaur has been voiced by various voice actors, including Megumi Hayashibara in Japanese, and Tara Sands and Michele Knotz in English.

Classified as a Grass and Poison-type Pokémon, Bulbasaur is one of three starter Pokémon players are able to select at the game's beginning. It is a quadrupedal green creature similar to a dinosaur and frog, bearing a big plant bulb on its back. Bulbasaur is a central character in the Pokémon anime, being one of Ash Ketchum's main Pokémon for the first season, with a different one later obtained by supporting character May. It is featured in various manga and is owned by protagonist Red in Pokémon Adventures.

Bulbasaur is generally considered one of the most popular Pokémon, having ranked highly in official popularity polls. Series producer Junichi Masuda has also specifically mentioned Bulbasaur as one of his favorite Pokémon. Its role in the anime has been suggested to have played a factor into its popularity.

== Conception and design ==
Bulbasaur is a species of fictional creatures called Pokémon created for the Pokémon media franchise. Developed by Game Freak and published by Nintendo, the Japanese franchise began in 1996 with the video games Pokémon Red and Green for the Game Boy, which were later released in North America as Pokémon Red and Blue in 1998. In these games and their sequels, the player assumes the role of a Trainer whose goal is to capture and use the creatures' special abilities to combat other Pokémon. Some Pokémon can transform into stronger species through a process called evolution via various means, such as exposure to specific items. Each Pokémon has one or two elemental types, which define its advantages and disadvantages when battling other Pokémon. A major goal in each game is to complete the Pokédex, a comprehensive Pokémon encyclopedia, by capturing, evolving, and trading with other Trainers to obtain individuals from all Pokémon species.

Bulbasaur first appeared as one of three Pokémon the player could choose as their first at the beginning of the initial Game Boy games, Pokémon Red and Blue, released in Japan in 1996. Its Japanese name, Fushigidane, is a combination of the Japanese words for mystery or miracle (fushigi) and seed (tane). While translating the game for English-speaking audiences, Nintendo gave the Pokémon "cleverly descriptive names" related to their appearance or features as a means to make the characters more relatable to American children, with Bulbasaur being named as a portmanteau relating to its dinosaurian appearance and the large garlic-shaped bulb on its back. Both the etymology and appearance of Bulbasaur, Ivysaur, and Venusaur show it getting increasingly more dangerous as it evolves. Bulbasaur can evolve into Ivysaur, which can then evolve into Venusaur. Bulbasaur was created by Atsuko Nishida, a character designer for Pocket Monsters Red and Blue, which she described as "working backwards" by basing it off the established Venusaur design. Afterwards, the design was finalized by lead artist Ken Sugimori who, towards the end of development, drew the promotional art of all the species to give them a unified look and make any last-minute changes.

The idea to feature Bulbasaur and the other Red and Blue starters in a significant role in Pokémon X and Y came around a year and a half into the development of the games. The Mega Evolutions for the three Pokémon's final forms were created, and the designers decided that they should give players an opportunity to receive one of these Pokémon from Professor Sycamore, the games' professor, so that players would be able to see and use these forms.

Despite their English names, Sugimori confirmed that the design of Bulbasaur and its evolutions are based on frogs. In the Pokémon franchise, Bulbasaur are small, amphibian and plant Pokémon that move on all four legs. They have blue-green bodies with darker blue-green spots. The seed on a Bulbasaur's back is planted at birth and then sprouts and grows along with it. The bulb absorbs sunlight which allows it to grow. They can survive for days without eating because the bulb stores energy. In the video games, Bulbasaur has two "types", elemental attributes that determine strengths and weaknesses: Grass and Poison. Series producer and director Junichi Masuda considered Bulbasaur the best starter Pokémon, finding it really cute and that it exemplifies what Pokémon is for him, citing the monster and plant combination. Bulbasaur has been voiced by Tara Sands and Michele Knotz in English in the Pokémon anime series.

== Appearances ==
Bulbasaur is the first Pokémon entry in the Pokédex. It made its video game debut in the Japanese-language games Pocket Monsters Red and Green. Along with Charmander and Squirtle, Bulbasaur is one of the initial three Pokémon the player can choose from at the beginning of the games. Bulbasaur and the other starters from Red and Blue are replaced by Pikachu in Pokémon Yellow, and is instead obtainable elsewhere in the game. Bulbasaur appears in all other entries in the main series, though in Pokémon Sword and Shield, Bulbasaur was not made available until the release of Pokémon Sword and Shield: The Isle of Armor. Similarly, Bulbasaur was not made available in Pokémon Scarlet and Violet until the release of The Indigo Disk.

Bulbasaur appears in various Pokémon spin-offs, including Pokémon Stadium and the Pokémon Mystery Dungeon series, where players may be assigned Bulbasaur in a personality quiz. Bulbasaur appears in both Pokémon Snap and New Pokémon Snap as Pokémon the player can take pictures of. Bulbasaur also features in Pokémon Go and as a playable character in Pokémon Unite. Outside of the Pokémon video games, Bulbasaur was also featured as a collectible in the Super Smash Bros. series. A costume for Mario based on it was added to Super Mario Maker.

In the Pokémon anime, multiple Bulbasaur are owned by various main characters, including series protagonist Ash Ketchum. The character May also captures one in Pokémon: Advanced. She later makes a guest appearance, where it is revealed that her Bulbasaur has fully evolved into a Venusaur. In Pokémon Adventures, a manga based on the plot of the Pokémon Red and Blue games, the character Red receives a Bulbasaur from Professor Oak, which he nicknames Saur. Bulbasaur also appears in the movie Detective Pikachu, where several of them appear. In making the film, a bulldog was used to understand the top-heavy movement of Bulbasaur, then puppeteers in London were hired to create 3D puppets of it. Facial expressions and texture details were added using CGI.

== Promotion and reception ==
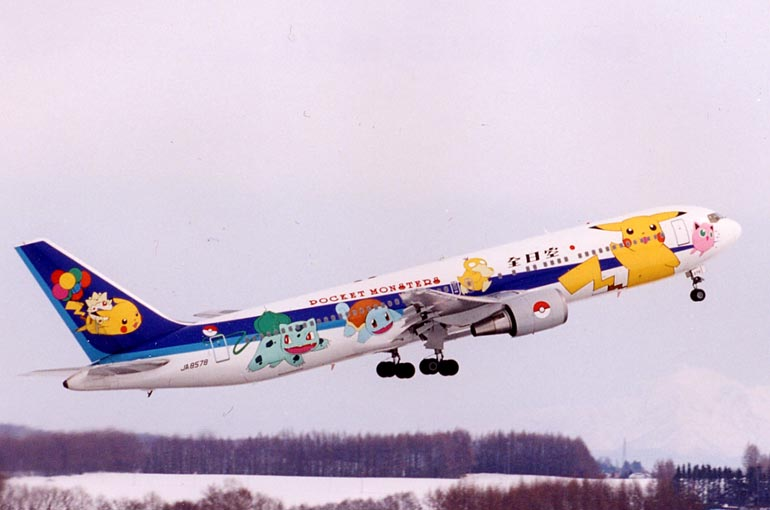
Bulbasaur has been used heavily in promotion for the series, such as on the side of planes.

Bulbasaur has been featured in merchandise, including toys and plush dolls. Bulbasaur has been depicted in action figures sold by Hasbro in the United States, while Tomy in Japan sold vinyl dolls, wind-up model kits, Singaporean popcorn with a flavor based on Bulbasaur, and terry cloth bean bags. It has been marketed via toys at fast-food chains such as McDonald's and Burger King. Bulbasaur has also been included in various versions of the Pokémon painting on ANA Boeing 767s. In 2021, Seiko made limited edition luxury watches based on Bulbasaur and its evolutionary family. The island nation of Niue issued a commemorative coin with a legal tender value of one crown, which has a Bulbasaur on the reverse side. Bulbasaur was also among the eleven Pokémon chosen as Japan's mascots in the 2014 FIFA World Cup. A Bulbasaur statue was installed on March 25, 2018, in the municipality of Suzano, São Paulo, Brazil, and was the first of several other Pokémon-related statues installed.

Bulbasaur has been largely praised by critics. Nintendo World Report's Pedro Hernandez highlighted its role in one episode of the anime, citing Bulbasaur's appealing storyline in the episode as endearing the species to him. He stated that this role helped him become a fan of the Pokémon franchise as a whole. IGN editor "Pokémon of the Day Chick" also praised Ash's "attitude-packing Bulbasaur" in the anime, and Official Nintendo Magazine's John Vekinis attributed his "love of Grass-type Pokémon" to Bulbasaur in spite of the Grass type's weaknesses. Chris Plante of Polygon called Bulbasaur the best Pokémon; while he felt it and its evolutions "comparably dull", they were "the most true to life" as it looked more "leathery and aged" after evolving, compared to the other starters. Other Polygon writers highlighted Bulbasaur for similar reasons, mostly notably for its design, which was highlighted for providing a good balance of design elements while remaining cute. Another writer highlighted Bulbasaur's appearance in Detective Pikachu, stating that its cute appearance and affectionate design helped endear him to the Pokémon. He further noted that age seemed to affect people's perception of Bulbasaur; whereas younger audiences saw it as weaker, older audiences tended to perceive it as a more cute and appealing creature. Bulbasaur was ranked the third best starter Pokémon in a poll of Japanese Pokémon fans by ITmedia. The staff felt the popularity of Bulbasaur derived from the anime, particularly Ash's Bulbasaur, who at the time was the Pokémon that was with the series protagonist for the longest time besides Pikachu, spanning four-and-a-half years. They speculated this led to fans growing to feel attached to Bulbasaur.

Bulbasaur has been noted to be less popular than Charmander and Squirtle. Nerdist attributed it to a lack of attention to the line early in the series because of Venusaur's omission from game box art in non-Japanese releases of the game. This led to one Twitter user creating an account named BulbaGanda to spread support for the Pokémon, which was met with considerable popularity.
