= Atsuko Nishida =

Japanese graphic artist, character designer, and illustrator

- 西田 敦子
- Born: Nishida Atsuko
- Known for: Video game design
- Notable work: Pokémon, Pulseman, Hometown Story

Atsuko Nishida (西田 敦子, Nishida Atsuko) is a Japanese graphic artist who previously worked at Game Freak and TOYBOX Inc. She designed a number of creatures for the Pokémon franchise, including one of the best-known Pokémon species, the franchise's mascot Pikachu.

== Career ==
Nishida was working at Game Freak on the game Pulseman with the art director for Pokémon, Ken Sugimori. In his initial character design, Sugimori made most of the Pokémon scary, but he realized he also wanted to have cute characters in the game. This led to the design of Pikachu, which was originally based on a daifuku, a Japanese sweet treat. Nishida changed the design later, basing it on a squirrel, as Nishida said she was obsessed with squirrels at the time. Squirrels were also her inspiration for the electric cheeks, as they tend to store food in their cheeks. Pikachu was later changed to be a mouse by Satoshi Tajiri, one of the Pokémon creators. The original design included the Raichu evolution, as well as a third evolution, which was later abandoned.

Nishida's other Pokémon design credits include Bulbasaur, Charmander, and Squirtle. She furthermore designed some of the Eevee evolutions (or "Eeveelutions"), including Glaceon and Sylveon. She was also the artist on a large number of Pokémon Trading Card Game cards, including the Pikachu Illustrator card, which was sold for $195,000 in 2019, winning it the Guinness World Record of most expensive Pokémon trading card (at auction). This beat the previous record from 2016 when a card with the same design by Nishida was sold for $54,970.

Nishida also worked for the Japanese game development studio TOYBOX Inc. on Hometown Story, a Nintendo 3DS game.

Also, while unconfirmed, due to her work on the entire Pikachu line and their resemblance to Pikachu, it is speculated that she also designed Mega Raichu X and Mega Raichu Y for the Pokémon: Legends Z-A Mega Dimension DLC.

== Personal life ==
Nishida is a very private person; she spent the entirety of a 2018 interview hidden behind a giant Pikachu plush doll.
