= Squirtle =

Pokémon species

- Pokémon character
- Squirtle artwork by Ken Sugimori
- First game: Pokémon Red and Blue (1996)
- Designed by: Atsuko Nishida
- Voiced by: Eric Stuart (English, 1998-2006); Michele Knotz (English, 2006-present); Rikako Aikawa (Japanese); Tomoe Hanba (May's, Japanese)

In-universe information
- Species: Pokémon
- Type: Water

Squirtle (/ˈskwɜːrtəl/), known as Zenigame (Japanese: ゼニガメ) in Japan, is a Pokémon species in Nintendo and Game Freak's Pokémon franchise. It was designed by Atsuko Nishida. Its name was changed from Zenigame to Squirtle during the English localization of the series in order to make it "clever and descriptive." In animated appearances, Squirtle is voiced in Japanese by Rikako Aikawa and in English localizations by Eric Stuart, and later Michele Knotz.

In the main series games, Squirtle can evolve into Wartortle, and can then further evolve into Blastoise. It is one of the three first partner Pokémon obtainable in Pokémon Red, Blue, and Green, the first games in the series. Squirtle has received a mostly positive reception since its debut. A group of specific Squirtle, known as the Squirtle Squad, additionally developed a strong popularity as a result of their appearance in the Pokémon anime. Squirtle has gone on to make playable appearances in Super Smash Bros. Brawl and Super Smash Bros. Ultimate.

== Design and characteristics ==
Squirtle is a species of fictional creatures called Pokémon created for the Pokémon media franchise. Developed by Game Freak and published by Nintendo, the Japanese franchise began in 1996 with the video games Pokémon Red and Green for the Game Boy, which were later released in North America as Pokémon Red and Blue in 1998. In these games and their sequels, the player assumes the role of a Trainer whose goal is to capture and use the creatures' special abilities to combat other Pokémon. Some Pokémon can transform into stronger species through a process called evolution via various means, such as exposure to specific items. Each Pokémon has one or two elemental types, which define its advantages and disadvantages when battling other Pokémon. A major goal in each game is to complete the Pokédex, a comprehensive Pokémon encyclopedia, by capturing, evolving, and trading with other Trainers to obtain individuals from all Pokémon species.

Squirtle was designed as one of the starter Pokémon of Pocket Monsters Red and Green by Atsuko Nishida, who based its design on its final form, a turtle-esque Pokémon called Blastoise. Squirtle, in the games, can evolve into Wartortle and then into Blastoise. Originally called "Zenigame" in Japanese, Nintendo decided to give the various Pokémon species "cleverly descriptive names" related to their appearance or features when translating the game for western audiences as a means to make the characters more relatable to American children. Squirtle's English name is a portmanteau of the words "squirt" and "turtle." The idea to feature Squirtle and the other Red and Blue starters in a significant role in Pokémon X and Y came about a year and a half into the development of the games. The Mega Evolutions for the three Pokémon's final forms were created, and the designers decided that they should give players an opportunity to receive one of these Pokémon in order to see their Mega Evolved form. Eric Stuart and Michele Knotz have voiced the character in English, while Rikako Aikawa, and Tomoe Hanba have voiced the character in Japanese.

== Appearances ==
The first video game appearance of Squirtle was in Pokémon Red and Blue, alongside the other two starters Charmander and Bulbasaur. It since went on to appear in various games following this, such as Pokémon X and Y, Pokémon: Let's Go, Pikachu! and Let's Go, Eevee!, Pokémon Sword and Shield, and Pokémon Scarlet and Violet. Outside of the main series, Squirtle appears in a wide variety of spin-offs, such as Pokémon Snap, the Pokémon Stadium series, the Pokémon Mystery Dungeon series, the Pokémon Rumble series, Pokémon Café Mix, Pokémon Masters EX, Pokémon Go, Pokkén Tournament, New Pokémon Snap, and Pokémon UNITE, among others. In Super Smash Bros. Brawl, Squirtle is a playable character under the command of the Pokémon Trainer, alongside Ivysaur and Charizard which must be switched between in order to avoid fatiguing the Pokémon. Squirtle returns as a playable character in Super Smash Bros. Ultimate for the Nintendo Switch, once again playable with Ivysaur and Charizard.

In the animated series, Ash Ketchum, Brock, and Misty encounter a gang of five Squirtle known as the Squirtle Squad in their debut episode "Here Comes the Squirtle Squad!". They first appear as delinquents, but their interactions with Ash and Co. result in them becoming honorary firefighters of their town. The squad's leader eventually decides to join Ash and his friends journey throughout the Kanto and Johto regions until reuniting with his squad in the episode "The Fire-ing Squad". Ash's second female companion, May, also owned a Squirtle. Green, the original female protagonist in Pokémon Adventures, stole a Squirtle from Professor Oak's laboratory. It was not seen until Chapter fifteen, "Wartortle Wars", by which point it had evolved into a Wartortle, nicknamed Turtley, which she used as a major member of her team. Squirtle later appeared as background elements in the live action movie Detective Pikachu.

== Promotion and reception ==
Squirtle has been featured in several forms of merchandise, including figurines, plush toys, and the Pokémon Trading Card Game. Squirtle was part of a special airplane livery. Squirtle was featured among other Pokémon as part of Burger King kids' meal cards. Analysts predicted that Squirtle, along with Pikachu, Bulbasaur, and Charmander, would lead the merchandising of the Pokémon series. Squirtle was among eleven Pokémon chosen as Japan's mascots in the 2014 FIFA World Cup.

Since it appeared in the Pokémon series, Squirtle has received generally positive reception. According to Time magazine, Squirtle was considered one of the "more popular" in the original series, while IGN ranked it the 46th best Pokémon ever, noting that it was "instantly recognisable." GamesRadar editor Brett Elston noted that while Charizard and Bulbasaur get "big props" from Pokémon players, Squirtle appears to be "more popular" from people who are not fans of the series, suggesting that its appearance may be a part of it. ITmedia also ranked Squirtle as the fourth best first partner Pokémon, primarily due to its familiarity even with those not too closely associated with the franchise.

The Squirtle Squad as they appear in the anime. The group have received significant attention since their debut. Their leader, who later joins Ash, is the one with the pointed shades at the bottom left.

Ryan Gilliam of Polygon claimed that Squirtle was the best starter Pokémon, stating that "Squirtle isn't adorable or fierce like the Charmander line, it doesn't breed eternal sympathy like Bulbasaur. Instead, Squirtle, Blastoise and even Wartortle are just cool dudes. They're cool turtles that are just cool together." He highlighted its design in comparison to Bulbasaur and Charmander, praising its simplicity and personality. San Antonio Express-News editor Susan Yerkes called Squirtle "disgustingly cute". GamesRadar editor Carolyn Gudmundson commented that Squirtle was the "coolest" of the three starting Pokémon in the anime, highlighting its association with the Squirtle Squad in the anime. Pocket Gamer listed and criticized Squirtle as the worst Pokémon ever, stating that Squirtle is "just a turtle". It has been cited as more "boring" than other Pokémon due to its similarities to other Pokémon of the same type as it.

The Squirtle Squad characters have been described as fan favorites, and have acted as the subject of several Pokémon GO collaboration events. Vice writer Diana Tourjée described the initial episode featuring them as something that scared her as a child, citing that the Squirtle Squad initially appeared terrifying to her. Despite this, she highlighted in a retrospective that the Squirtle Squad's story was a powerful one that resonated with many groups of people. She stated that the attempts of the local police to paint them as a gang showed an unfair prejudice against a group that did not deserve it, and how it built the family dynamic between the Squirtle Squad members. TheGamer's Khee Hoon Chan cited similar sentiments, stating that despite their initially menacing appearance, the Squad had a powerful backstory and a strong popularity among fans.

Gabriel Boric Font received a Squirtle plush just prior to his Inauguration as President of Chile as a gift from Japan after he stated he was a fan of the series. During a collaboration event in Pokémon GO with singer Ed Sheeran, Squirtle was a major focus event, which was stated to be due to Squirtle being Sheeran's favorite.
