= Charmander =

Pokémon species

- Pokémon character
- Charmander artwork by Ken Sugimori
- First game: Pokémon Red and Blue (1996)
- Designed by: Atsuko Nishida; Ken Sugimori (finalized)
- Pokédex Number: 0004

In-universe information
- Species: Pokémon
- Type: Fire

Charmander (/ˈtʃɑːrmændər/), known in Japan as Hitokage (Japanese: ヒトカゲ), is a Pokémon species in Nintendo and Game Freak's Pokémon media franchise, and the first form of its respective evolutionary line, which includes Charmeleon and its final form Charizard. First introduced in the 1996 video games Pokémon Red and Blue, it has appeared in multiple games including Pokémon Go and the Pokémon Trading Card Game, as well as various merchandise.

Classified as a Fire-type Pokémon, Charmander is one of the three first Pokémon available in the first games, alongside the Grass-type Pokémon Bulbasaur and Water-type Squirtle, which it is strong and weak to, respectively. It is an orange bipedal lizard with a flaming tail. In addition to its video game appearances, it also appears in the Pokémon TV series as one of protagonist Ash Ketchum's earliest Pokémon after saving it. When this Charmander evolves, it begins to disobey Ash, only becoming loyal again after Ash saves it as a Charizard.

Charmander has been generally well received, considered among the most popular Pokémon species as well as one of the best Starter Pokémon. Its popularity was attributed in part to Charizard's design, a similarly popular Pokémon. It is notably a difficult Pokémon to choose in Red and Blue due to its typing having early-game disadvantages to opponents.

== Concept and design ==
Charmander is a species of fictional creatures called Pokémon created for the Pokémon media franchise. Developed by Game Freak and published by Nintendo, the Japanese franchise began in 1996 with the video games Pokémon Red and Green for the Game Boy, which were later released in North America as Pokémon Red and Blue in 1998. In these games and their sequels, the player assumes the role of a Trainer whose goal is to capture and use the creatures' special abilities to combat other Pokémon. Some Pokémon can transform into stronger species through a process called evolution via various means, such as exposure to specific items. Each Pokémon has one or two elemental types, which define its advantages and disadvantages when battling other Pokémon. A major goal in each game is to complete the Pokédex, a comprehensive Pokémon encyclopedia, by capturing, evolving, and trading with other Trainers to obtain individuals from all Pokémon species.

Most Pokémon games have a trio of Pokémon called "Starter Pokémon". This trio always consist of a Fire, Grass, and Water-type Pokémon, with Fire beating Grass, Grass beating Water, and Water beating Fire. Charmander is the Fire-type member of the original Starter trio, alongside the Grass-type Bulbasaur and Water-type Squirtle. Charmander evolves into Charmeleon after battling and reaching a high enough level, which eventually evolves into Charizard. Upon evolving into Charizard, it gains a Flying-type in addition to its Fire-type. Charmander was designed by Atsuko Nishida, who was also responsible for the rest of the evolutionary line, as well as the starters Bulbasaur, Squirtle and Wartortle. According to Nishida, she created Charmander by working backwards from Charizard, wanting the evolution from the base to the final form to seem "unimaginable". It is a bipedal lizard with an orange body and a flame on its tail. It is said to be based on multiple different types of giant salamander, including the Chinese giant salamander and Japanese giant salamander. The etymology behind its name has conflicting reports; according to the Lisa Hatfield's Pockemon Journal, published on the Game Freak website, Charmander's name was a mix between "char" and "salamander". In an interview with Inside Games in February 2016, The Pokémon Company CEO Tsunekazu Ishihara stated that its name was a combination of "charcoal" and "Salamandra".

== Appearances ==
Charmander first appears in Pokémon Red and Green (Red and Blue outside of Japan), and is one of the three first Pokémon the player can choose from when offered by Professor Oak, alongside Bulbasaur and Squirtle. If the player instead chooses Bulbasaur, the protagonist's rival will choose Charmander; if Squirtle is chosen, Charmander will remain in Oak's lab. In Pokémon Yellow, the player receives a Pikachu as opposed to any of the three Starter Pokémon; instead a Charmander can be received from a trainer in this game as a gift. A Charmander was given away in February 2006 as part of a two-week-long event, able to be obtained in Pokémon Ruby, Sapphire, Emerald, Pokémon FireRed, and LeafGreen. Charmander has also been featured as an additional Starter Pokémon option in future games, including the remakes of Pokémon Gold and Silver, HeartGold and SoulSilver, Pokémon X and Y, and X and Y's sequel, Pokémon Legends Z-A. Charmander could be found in the wild in Pokémon Ultra Sun and Ultra Moon and the remakes Let's Go, Pikachu! and Let's Go, Eevee!, the latter also including it as a gift Pokémon like in Yellow. It is also given as a gift in Pokémon Sword and Shield by the Champion Leon after beating him, and while not featured in Pokémon Scarlet and Violet at launch, Charmander was included in the second part of The Hidden Treasure of Area Zero expansion pack, The Indigo Disk.

Charmander appears in various spin-offs, including Pokémon Masters EX, Pokémon Go, Pokémon Snap, and the Pokémon Mystery Dungeon series. It also appears in the Pokémon Trading Card Game; it received multiple cards, with a card based on its appearance Pokémon Snap that sold alongside cards of Bulbasuar and Squirtle for $230,000. Outside of the Pokémon series, Charmander appears in the Super Smash Bros. series as a summonable ally and Super Mario Maker as a costume that protagonist Mario could wear.

In the Pokémon TV series, protagonist Ash Ketchum finds a Charmander that was abandoned by its previous owner due to him believing it to be too weak. The Charmander waited for its trainer to return due to being told that he would come back for it, causing Charmander to be inundated by the rain that made its tail flame weak. To save it, Ash rushed it to a Pokémon Center to help it heal; once it recovered, it returned to where it was left. Upon the return of its trainer, he stated that he did it to toughen Charmander up. Charmander rejects him, and chooses to become one of Ash's Pokémon instead. It eventually evolved into a Charmeleon, at which point it became disobedient. This disobedience remained upon evolving into Charizard, a trend that continued until Ash helped save its life like he did for it as a Charmander, making it loyal to Ash again. It also appears in the TV special Pokémon Origins.

Charmander has been depicted in multiple pieces of merchandise, including plushies, figures, model kits, food items, jewelry, apparel, and McDonald's Happy Meal toys. In Henderson, Nevada, certain streets were renamed after Pokémon species, including Charmander.

== Critical reception ==
Charmander's evolution, Charizard, is said by multiple critics to be a part of why Charmander is so popular, due in part to its design

Charmander has received positive reception since its introduction, with critics such as Game Informer writer Kyle Hilliard considering Charmander among the greatest of the Pokémon in Red and Blue and stating that it was a "great, lovable fire beast" and was popular due to "fire [being fun]", adding that it evolving into Charizard made it even better. Polygon writer Allega Frank considered Charmander the best Pokémon, stating that it was the very first Pokémon she ever had and that all other Pokémon in her team was there to support her and her Charmander. When Charmander evolved into Charmeleon, she felt disappointed, stating that it was not her "beautiful bestie", though she still felt attachment to it. She stated that it being an "adorable lizard guy [with a] shy smile and burning little flame" is what made her pick it originally, and what made her continue to favor it over other Pokémon. In a discussion between Polygon staff about who the best Starter Pokémon in Pokémon Red and Blue was, multiple editors stated their preferences for Charmander. In addition to Frank, who stated that she has an "enshrined collection" of Charmander merchandise, staff such as Samit Sarkar, Ashley Oh, Jake Lear, Griffin McElroy, and Susana Polo favored it over the others, making it the most popular among the website's staff. Polo, Oh, and Sarkar cited its evolution into Charizard as a factor, while McElroy stated that Charmander was the superior choice due to balancing, arguing that Water and Grass-type Pokémon were easier to come by early on. Prima Games writer Bryson Maddock considered Charmander the best Starter Pokémon, stating that it was an easy choice to make due to how good Charizard was. He added that it was a popular Pokémon early on, and that Charmander is still sought after due to its evolution.

In a video, Nintendo Life contributor Zion Grassl stated that he found Charmander ugly, while fellow contributor Alex Olney stated that he was disaffected by how omnipresent Charmander was. This was a sentiment shared by John Cartwright, who compared it to Burger King in this sense. Cartwright considered it his favorite of its line, stating that it only became uglier as it evolved. USA Today writer Cian Maher stated his preference for Charmander over Charizard, stating that while Charizard may be more popular, Charmander's designs is among the best for a Fire type in the series. He cited the lore around its tail fire, feeling that this was "extremely grim for a story meant for kids" but appreciated how they incorporated a fire concept into its design. GamesBeat writers Jeff Grubb and Mike Minotti both considered Charmander a particularly good Starter Pokémon. Grubb felt that the entire evolutionary line was strong, and compared it to Bulbasaur, arguing that there was more mystique to Charmander due to the flame on its tail. He stated that it was the "ideal" Pokémon as far as what a Pokémon species should be. Minotti believed that he had a simpler design, appreciating that over later Starter Pokémon species and that the Starter trio of Red and Blue focused on a single color.

Charmander has been noted as being a particularly difficult choice for a Starter Pokémon in Red and Blue due to a disadvantageous type match-up against the first Gym Leader's Rock-type Pokémon and the second Gym Leader's Water-type Pokémon. Futabanet writer Honey stated that, due to Charizard being on the box art of Pokémon Red, Charmander was the most popular Starter Pokémon, but also that it was the most difficult Starter due to the early challenges in the game. They explained that this was compounded by the lack of strong Pokémon early on, which they stated could cause the player to become stuck. Charmander was analyzed as part of IGN's "Pokémon of the Day" series, the author stating that it was the most popular of the three starters thanks to its superior speed, adding that it evolving into Charizard was another reason many people picked it.

Charmander has had multiple significant moments in Pokémon TV series. Charmander's first appearance in the anime was considered one of the saddest moments of the series by IGN staff. GameSpot writer Tamoor Hussain agreed that it was sad, stating that it showed how trainers could abuse their Pokémon's affection for them. He considered it one of the series' best moments, discussing another moment in the series where Ash nurses Charizard back to health, which he believed evoked Charmander's first appearance. A scene in the TV special Pokémon Origins where Squirtle bites Charmander was considered particularly noteworthy by critics, with Crunchyroll News writer Daniel Dockery remarking that the sound of Charmander screaming was "haunting" and something he'd never heard in Pokémon before.
