= Blastoise =

Pokémon species

- Pokémon character
- Blastoise artwork by Ken Sugimori
- First game: Pokémon Red and Blue (1996)

In-universe information
- Species: Tortoise
- Type: Water

Blastoise (/ˈblæstɔɪs/), known as Kamex (Japanese: カメックス, Hepburn: Kamekkusu) in Japan, is a Pokémon species in Nintendo and Game Freak's Pokémon media franchise. A blue, tortoise-based Pokémon, it is the evolved form of Wartortle and the final evolution of Squirtle. First introduced in the video games Pokémon Red and Blue, it is one of three final evolutions of the first Pokémon players can choose from, alongside Venusaur and Charizard, and is featured on the box art of Pokémon Blue. Since Blastoise's debut, it has appeared in multiple games including Pokémon Go and the Pokémon Trading Card Game, as well as various merchandise. It was among the most popular Pokémon action figures as of September 2000, and a Blastoise card was among the most valuable in the Trading Card Game.

Classified as a Water-type Pokémon, Blastoise is a large blue bipedal turtle Pokémon, featuring a pair of water cannons protruding from its shell above its shoulders and three claws on its hands and feet. It has received multiple powered up forms, including Mega Blastoise and the larger Gigantamax Blastoise, which change its design.

Blastoise has received positive reception, identified as one of the most popular Pokémon. The nature and workings of Blastoise's water cannons were the subject of scholarly commentary, with one author estimating that they could lift Blastoise 10 stories and another estimating that they produce 386,000 joules of energy. The way the series handled its cannons was also the subject of commentary, with criticism following the game no longer having water coming from its cannons and praise for changing it back.

== Concept and creation ==
Blastoise is a species of fictional creatures called Pokémon created for the Pokémon media franchise. Developed by Game Freak and published by Nintendo, the Japanese franchise began in 1996 with the video games Pokémon Red and Green for the Game Boy, which were later released in North America as Pokémon Red and Blue in 1998. In these games and their sequels, the player assumes the role of a Trainer whose goal is to capture and use the creatures' special abilities to combat other Pokémon. Some Pokémon can transform into stronger species through a process called evolution via various means, such as exposure to specific items. Each Pokémon has one or two elemental types, which define its advantages and disadvantages when battling other Pokémon. A major goal in each game is to complete the Pokédex, a comprehensive Pokémon encyclopedia, by capturing, evolving, and trading with other Trainers to obtain individuals from all Pokémon species.

Blastoise is classified as a Water-type Pokémon, evolving from the Pokémon Wartortle, which itself is an evolution of Squirtle. According to a group called Helix Chamber, Wartortle was originally intended to evolve into a different Pokémon based on a sprite sheet that they had, a Pokémon that Polygon writer Allegra Frank believed resembled Wartortle more than Blastoise did. A separate sprite resembling Blastoise was also in this sheet, leading Frank to speculate that it was later made Wartortle's evolution.

=== Design ===
Blastoise is a blue bipedal turtle Pokémon, featuring two water cannons protruding from its back. Blastoise has "angry anime eyes", featuring lines slanted towards one another, white sclera, and dark pupils. It also features clawed hands and feet, with three claws on its hands. It has a pair of triangular ears on its head. A new form, Mega Blastoise, was introduced in Pokémon X and Y, attained by equipping an object called "Blastoisinite" to it. This form loses its shoulder cannons, replacing them with two cannons protruding from its arms and one from the top of its shell above its head. In Pokémon Sword and Shield downloadable content, a new form called Gigantamax Blastoise is introduced, which is significantly larger than Blastoise.

== Appearances ==
Blastoise originally appeared in the video games Pokémon Red and Blue, appearing on the cover art of Blue, typically obtained in each game by evolving a Squirtle into a Wartortle and then a Blastoise. The games have three initial Pokémon choices called Starter Pokémon offered by the character Professor Oak: Bulbasaur, Charmander, and Squirtle. If the player chooses Squirtle, the rival will choose Bulbasaur to counter it; if they choose Charmander, the player's rival, Blue, will instead choose Squirtle and eventually evolve it into Blastoise. In Pokémon Yellow, Squirtle can be obtained from a character named Officer Jenny. Remakes of Pokémon Red, Blue, and Yellow feature Blastoise as well, including Pokémon FireRed and LeafGreen and Let's Go, Pikachu! and Let's Go, Eevee! Blastoise, as well as its prior forms, appear in all subsequent mainline Pokémon games released since aside from Pokémon Legends Arceus. In both Pokémon Sword and Shield and Pokémon Scarlet and Violet, Blastoise is only made available in downloadable content released at a later date.

Blastoise is featured in multiple other Pokémon games, including Pokémon Go, the Pokémon Mystery Dungeon series, and New Pokémon Snap. Blastoise appears in the Pokémon Trading Card Game, first introduced in the original Base Set run of cards. In order to convince Nintendo of the viability of the card game in English-speaking markets, the company Wizards of the Coast created a Blastoise card as a proof of concept, of which two were printed, though only one is known to exist as of December 2023. In Pokkén Tournament DX, Blastoise appears as a playable character, and can turn into Mega Blastoise. It also appears as a playable character in Pokémon Unite, and can equip different costumes. Blastoise appears as a summonable ally in multiple Super Smash Bros. entries, including Super Smash Bros. for Nintendo 64 and Super Smash Bros. Melee.

In the Pokémon TV series, Blastoise makes few appearances. It appears as a partner of protagonist Ash Ketchum's rival Gary Oak, and also appears in the episode "Beach Blank-Out Blastoise", and also appears in the film Pokémon: The First Movie.

== Reception ==
Blastoise has been a fan favorite Pokémon since the release of Pokémon Red and Blue and one of the best-known Pokémon species according to Beckett Pokémon Unofficial Collector writer Sean Cooper, who attributed this to its appearance on the cover of Pokémon Blue. Polygon writer Ryan Gilliam felt that Blastoise was a "shining beacon" of Water-type Pokémon, praising it for how cool it is, as well as how well it pulls off its shell cannons. GamesBeat writers Jeff Grubbs and Mike Minotti both felt that Blastoise was a cooler Pokémon than Charizard, Grubbs remarking how powerful it looks. Minotti believed that it, alongside the other two, resembled monsters, comparing it positively to later starter final forms, which he believed were too human-like. IGN writer Rich felt that, despite enjoying dragons, he found the concept of a "blue turtle with giant cannons" amazing, regarding it as one of the best Pokémon. IGN Southeast Asia writer Dale Bashir regarded it as one of the most important Pokémon, attributing the popularity of Red and Blue in part on Blastoise's design.

Blastoise was the subject of a viral rap song called "Blastoise!" by musician Genwunner which paid tribute to it. This song went viral on TikTok, with videos produced featuring footage from Pokken Tournament of Blastoise set to the music. Kotaku writer Kenneth Shepard lamented how Charizard got more focus than Blastoise and Venusaur from both Nintendo and fans despite receiving some love. He expressed appreciation for the song, as well as it being more popular on TikTok than the rapper's songs for the other two. Destructoid writer Eric Van Allen found Blastoise's appearance in New Pokémon Snap to be one of the best moments of the game, considering finding it to be a magical moment and a good way to end the game for him. He felt that the Blastoise flying away contributed to the significance of this moment.

Professor João Paulo dos Anjos analyzed the power of Blastoise's water cannons and Hydro Pump attack, estimating that they would have a lot of power, but only be able to produce water for less than 0.118 seconds based on his math and estimations. He believed this was reflected in the lower accuracy of Hydro Pump, stating that a Blastoise would have to be a good shot with its Hydro Pump. He approximated that each shot of a water cannon would have the power of a 1300 kg car going 80 km per hour. While analyzing Mega Blastoise's additional water cannon, he came to the conclusion that Hydro Pump by Mega Blastoise would be three times stronger. He also determined that a Blastoise could fly to the height of a 10-story building before the Hydro Pump ran out. In another paper as part of the Journal of Interdisciplinary Science, author Thomas Codd analyzed the three final forms of the starter Pokémon, deducing that Blastoise's water cannons were capable of producing 386,000 joules of energy and was the second strongest, above Venusaur and below Charizard.

In games such as Pokémon Stadium, Blastoise's water cannons shoot water when Blastoise uses certain attacks; according to Inside Games, this changed in Pokémon X and Y where it shoots water from its mouth, a trend that continued until Pokémon Scarlet and Violet. ComicBook.com writer Tanner Dedmon identified fan demand for Blastoise to shoot water from its cannons, expressing hope that comments from Pokémon series producer Junichi Masuda that Sword and Shield would feature more high-quality animations. The change in Scarlet and Violet was met with positive reception from fans.

According to Nintendo of America marketer Gail Tilden, Blastoise, alongside Charizard, was "by far" the best-selling Pokémon action figures. The Blastoise presentation card created as a proof of concept for the Pokémon Trading Card Game is among the most valuable Pokémon cards, having sold for 360,000 USD. Beckett Pokémon Unofficial Collector staff identified a video of a child getting a Blastoise card as having contributed to Blastoise's popularity.
