= Charizard =

Pokémon species

- Pokémon character
- Charizard artwork by Ken Sugimori, circa 2004
- First game: Pokémon Red and Blue (1996)
- Designed by: Atsuko Nishida (normal form and Mega Charizard X); Tomohiro Kitakaze (Mega Charizard X and Mega Charizard Y)
- Voiced by: Shin-ichiro Miki
- Pokédex Number: 0006

In-universe information
- Species: Pokémon
- Type: Fire and Flying; Fire and Dragon (Mega Charizard X)

Charizard (/ˈtʃɑːrɪzɑːrd/), known in Japan as Lizardon (Japanese: リザードン, Hepburn: Rizādon), is a Pokémon in Nintendo and Game Freak's Pokémon franchise. Created by Atsuko Nishida, Charizard first appeared in the video games Pokémon Red and Blue (Pokémon Red and Green in Japan) and subsequent sequels. They have later appeared in various merchandise, spinoff titles and animated and printed adaptations of the franchise. Shin-ichiro Miki voices Charizard in both the Japanese and English-language versions of the anime. An orange, dragon-like Pokémon, Charizard is the evolved form of Charmeleon and the final evolution of Charmander. It also has two "Mega Evolved" forms, Mega Charizard X and Y, that were likely both designed by Tomohiro Kitakaze, the designer of Mega Charizard X. It also has a Gigantamax form in Pokémon Sword and Shield, which changes its appearance and size.

Charizard is featured in the Pokémon anime series, with the most recurring being owned by the main character of the series, Ash Ketchum. It is featured in printed adaptations such as Pokémon Adventures. Charizard is regarded as one of the most famous and popular fire-type Pokémon, and has received positive reception from fans and the media since its debut into the series.

== Concept and characteristics ==
Charizard is a species of fictional creatures called Pokémon created for the Pokémon media franchise. Developed by Game Freak and published by Nintendo, the Japanese franchise began in 1996 with the video games Pokémon Red and Green for the Game Boy, which were later released in North America as Pokémon Red and Blue in 1998. In these games and their sequels, the player assumes the role of a Trainer whose goal is to capture and use the creatures' special abilities to combat other Pokémon. Some Pokémon can transform into stronger species through a process called evolution via various means, such as exposure to specific items. Each Pokémon has one or two elemental types, which define its advantages and disadvantages when battling other Pokémon. A major goal in each game is to complete the Pokédex, a comprehensive Pokémon encyclopedia, by capturing, evolving, and trading with other Trainers to obtain individuals from all Pokémon species.

Charizard was designed by Atsuko Nishida for the first generation of Pocket Monsters games, Red and Green, which were localized outside Japan as Pokémon Red and Blue. Charizard was designed before Charmander, with Charmander being based on Charizard's design. Originally called "Lizardon" in Japanese, Nintendo decided to give the various Pokémon species "clever and descriptive names" related to their appearance or features when translating the game for western audiences as a means to make the characters more relatable to American children. As a result, the species was renamed "Charizard", a portmanteau of the words "charcoal" or "char" and "lizard". During an interview, Pokémon Company President Tsunekazu Ishihara stated that Charizard was expected to be popular with North American audiences because of their preference for strong, powerful characters. When Pokémon X and Y were being developed, it was decided that the final forms of the starter Pokémon — Bulbasaur, Charmander, and Squirtle — would receive Mega Evolutions about one and a half years into the development of the games. Charmander, alongside Bulbasaur and Squirtle, were added to the game in a significant role in order to allow players to experience Charizard's Mega Evolution as the player played through the games.

Whereas its pre-evolutions were ground-bound with Charmander being salamander-like and Charmeleon being chameleon-like, Charizard's design is inspired by dragons, more specifically European dragons. Charizard has two elemental "types" in-game, Fire and Flying, which determine its in battle strengths and weaknesses. Despite its draconic origins, Charizard does not gain the Dragon typing outside of its form change into Mega Charizard X.

Mega Charizard X (left) and Mega Charizard Y (right) as they appear in artwork for Pokémon X and Y. Charizard has numerous alternate forms.

Charizard can breathe flames so intense that they can melt boulders, but will never torch a weaker foe. If Charizard becomes angry, the flame at the tip of their tail can flare up in a whitish-blue color. Mega Charizard X has a black, toned body and hotter blue flames. Mega Charizard Y, by comparison, more closely resembles Charizard's original color design, and has significantly stronger flying abilities according to the games. Charizard has an additional "Shiny form," which changes the species' natural color schemes. Charizard's shiny form first appeared in Pokémon Gold and Silver, and could be encountered in many games afterwards, including in Pokémon Go, where it could be obtained in many events, such as during special Community Day events featuring Charmander. In Pokémon Sword and Shield, Charizard is capable of Gigantamaxing, which causes it to grow significantly in size and change its appearance. If Charizard knows any Fire-type damage dealing moves, they will be transformed into G-Max Wildfire, which deals damage after the attack for five turns. Gigantamax Charizard is most notably used by the games' Champion and final boss, Leon.

== Appearances ==
=== In video games ===
Charizard made its video game debut in 1996 with the Japanese release of Pokémon Red and Blue. It is available only through evolving Charmander, who is one of the first Pokémon the player can choose at the start of the game. Charizard has since subsequently appeared in numerous games in the series. In Pokémon Gold, Silver, and Crystal, and their remakes Pokémon HeartGold and SoulSilver, Charizard is used by Red, who acts as the games' final boss. Charizard is one of several Pokémon in Pokémon X and Y that is able to use the new Mega Evolution mechanic. When equipped with a "Mega Stone" item, Charizard can change into either Mega Charizard X or Mega Charizard Y. It later re-appeared in Pokémon Sword and Shield, where it is notably used by the games' Champion and final boss, Leon. It has a special "Gigantamax" form, which was introduced in this game.

Charizard has made appearances in many other Pokémon games. It appears in Pokémon Mystery Dungeon: Blue Rescue Team and Red Rescue Team on a team with an Alakazam and Tyranitar, who play a significant role in the story. In Pokémon Ranger, Charizard is a boss Pokémon who becomes attached to the player's character and assists him or her throughout the game. Charizard returns in Pokémon Ranger: Guardian Signs as another boss character, and later appears in the Pokémon Rumble series. It also appears in Pokémon Snap and its sequel, New Pokémon Snap.

Charizard has appeared in every entry of the Super Smash Bros. series. While it could only be temporarily summoned using a Poké Ball item in earlier games, it became playable in Super Smash Bros. Brawl as one of three Pokémon under the command of the Pokémon Trainer. The Trainer has a stamina mechanic with his Pokémon, requiring the Pokémon to be swapped out when they are tired. Charizard is playable as a standalone character in Super Smash Bros. for Nintendo 3DS and Wii U. In-game, its moveset has received alterations, and it gains a new Final Smash where it transforms into Mega Charizard X. Charizard returns in Super Smash Bros. Ultimate, where it is once again under the command of the Pokémon Trainer. According to The Pokémon Company, the reason for Charizard's separation in 3DS and Wii U was due to it disobeying Pokémon Trainer to fight solo, before later rejoining him in Ultimate. Charizard also appears as a playable fighter in Pokkén Tournament and Pokémon Unite.

=== In other media ===
In the anime, a Charizard is one of main protagonist Ash Ketchum's Pokémon. Ash rescued it from the verge of death as a Charmander after its previous trainer abandoned it. After it evolved, Charizard grew disobedient, believing itself to be stronger than Ash. After Charizard was frozen solid during a battle, Ash helped Charizard recover, at which point Charizard began to obey Ash's commands and respect him again. Eventually, Ash left Charizard at the Charicific Valley, where he stayed behind to train. Charizard occasionally returned to aid Ash after this, re-appearing in the third movie, Spell of the Unown, in order to save Ash. Charizard later rejoined his team during the Best Wishes series, and stayed with Professor Oak following this. He later re-appeared in Pokémon Journeys: The Series.

Charizard has been Ash's goto Pokemon high stakes battle.Charizard defeated gym leader Blaine's Magmar in Indigo League and also took on Mewtwo head on in the movie, Pokemon: The First Movie. Later on, in Orange Islands, he played a decisive role in winning badges and finally the Orange league, where he defeated Drake's Electabuzz and gravely weakened his Dragonite. Then in Johto League, Ash called his Charizard back from Charicific Valley for his league matches, where he defeated three of Gary Oak's pokemons - Scizor, Golem and Blastoise despite type disadvantage, in quarterfinals. Then he narrowly lost to Harrison's Blaziken in the semifinal.

Afterwards, Charizard made his appearance in Battle Frontier, where Ash called him back to fight Noland's Articuno, a legendary pokemon which he won and later against Brandon's Dusclops, which resulted in a loss. After Battle Frontier, Charizard came after 7 seasons in Black & White: Best Wishes for a match against Iris's Dragonite defeating him.

In the Pokémon Adventures manga, one of the protagonists, Blue, receives a Charmander from his grandfather Professor Oak. It is later shown to have evolved into a Charizard, and Blue uses it as one of his main Pokémon throughout the series. A Charizard appears in the movie Detective Pikachu, where it attacks the protagonists of the film during a scene in the film. A Magikarp evolves into a Gyarados in order to fight it. Charizard appears often in the Pokémon Trading Card Game, most notably in the series' initial release. Cards featuring the character have been stated to be the most desired of the series, quickly rising to high prices amongst collectors and retailers. Some cards have sold from tens of thousand to hundreds of thousands in USD. A rare first edition 1999 Pokémon Charizard No. 4 card was sold by Heritage Auctions in 2022 for $336,000. Logan Paul has been stated to have strongly influenced the demand for Charizard cards, most notably after his fight with Floyd Mayweather, in which Paul wore a Charizard card around his neck.

== Reception ==
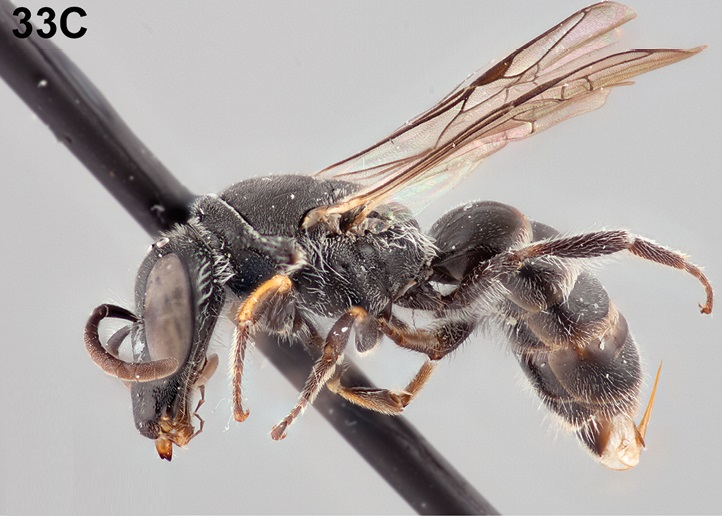
A female of the Chilicola charizard species, which is named after Charizard.

Charizard has received positive reception since its debut. In 2005, search engine Yahoo! reported Charizard as "one of the top Pokémon-related web searches", while in 2020, Charizard was voted as one of the top ten most popular Pokémon by fans. Kevin Slackie of Paste noted that despite Charizard's intimidating appearance, its appealing design made it popular with many. Dale Bishir of IGN described Charizard as being an iconic fixture of the series due to its prevalence in various media related to the franchise. Steven Bogos of The Escapist listed Charizard as second of their favorite Pokémon, describing it as "awesome across all of the franchise's properties". A Charizard statue representing the Pokémon in its real size was installed in May 2018 in the municipality of Suzano, located in São Paulo in Brazil. Since its installation, the statue has undergone maintenance, even receiving a mask temporarily during the COVID-19 pandemic in 2020. A street in Las Vegas was named after Charizard, while a species of bee, Chilicola charizard, was named after the species.

In a poll by Official Nintendo Magazine, Charizard was voted as the "best Fire-type Pokémon". They stated, "not only is Charizard your favourite fire Pokémon, but it is probably one of the most popular 'mon of all time". Kotaku editor Patricia Hernandez criticized Charizard's Y Mega Evolution for not differing enough from Charizard's original design, while praising Mega Charizard X's new design and attributes by comparison. Described by the media as "a lean, ferocious, fire-breathing dragon ... sleek, powerful, and utterly destructive", Charizard has been noted as one of the franchise's "most popular" characters. VG247 writer Nadia Oxford highlighted Charizard's design as helping to endear her to the series, further stating that its "iconic" design and draconic appearance helped make the series popular with children. She also praised the Mega Evolution mechanic for revitalizing Charizard, stating that it "helped refresh this ancient Pokemon mascot in our hearts and minds."

Retailers have attributed the high sales of merchandise related to the character to the popularity of the character's dragon-like and appealing design with children. Interviewed children have stated similar; they attributed its appeal to its "cool looking" appearance, associating the character with the "concepts of stubbornness and power". The book Rebuilding Attachments With Traumatized Children stated psychiatrists utilized the character as an empowered character, with traumatized children who were fans of the Pokémon series being able to relate to the Pokémon. The book Pikachu's Global Adventure: The Rise and Fall of Pokémon cited Charizard as "popular" with older male children who tended to be drawn to "tough or scary" characters, and compared the character's evolution from Charmander into Charizard with the loss of "cuteness" as one leaves childhood. Despite Charizard's popularity, Laura Gray of Screen Rant responded negatively to Charizard's prevalence in the series, citing that its frequent re-appearances alongside series mascot Pikachu took focus away from other popular Pokémon in the series.
