= Junichi Masuda =

Japanese video game composer and developer (born 1968)

- 増田 順一
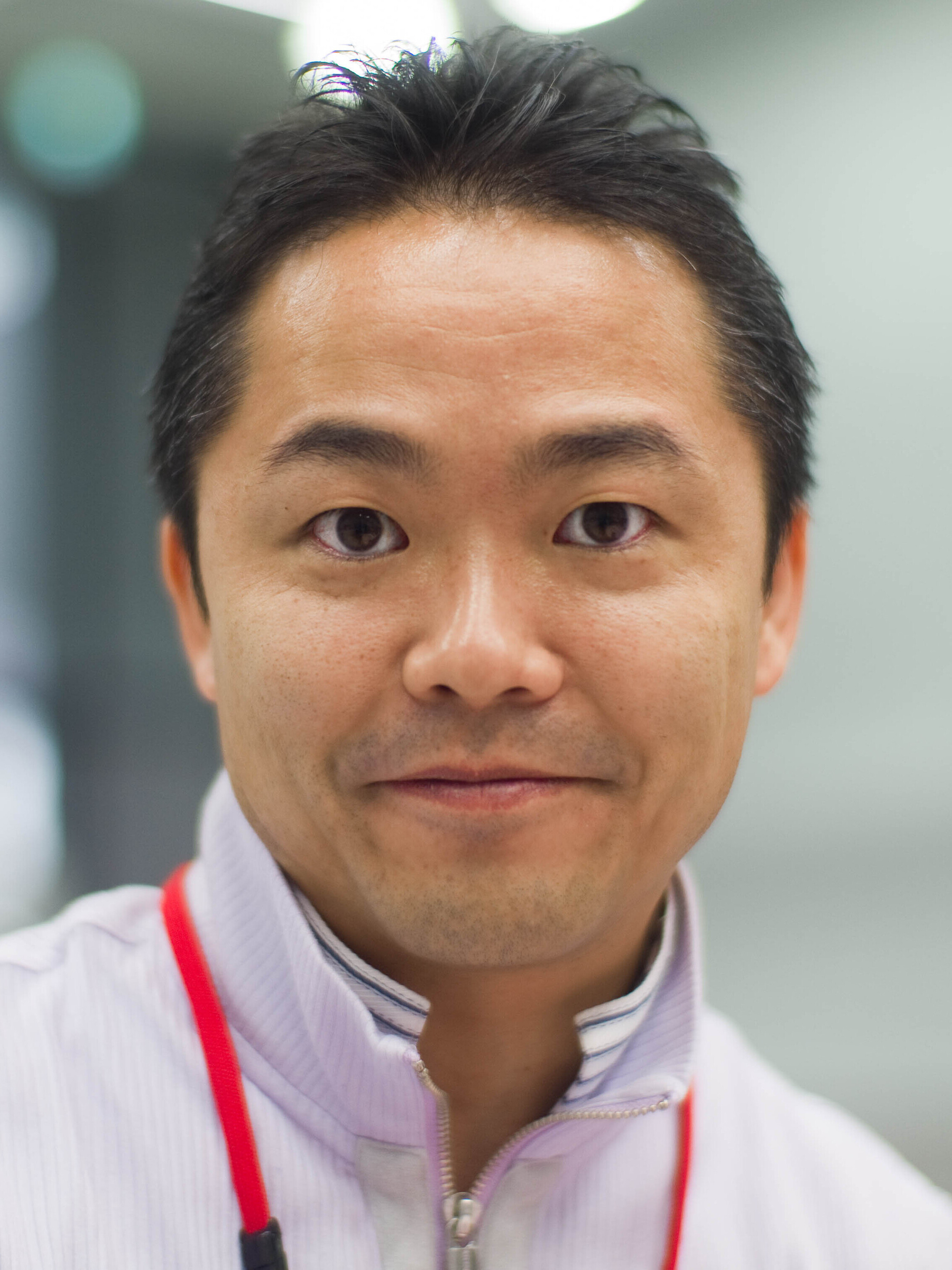
- Masuda in 2011
- Born: January 12, 1968 (age 58); Yokohama, Kanagawa, Japan
- Education: Japan Electronics College
- Occupations: Composer; director; designer; producer; programmer
- Years active: 1989–present
- Employers: Game Freak (1989–2022); The Pokémon Company (2022–present)
- Musical career
- Genre: Video game music
- Instruments: Piano, trombone

Junichi Masuda (増田 順一, Masuda Jun'ichi; born January 12, 1968) is a Japanese video game composer, director, designer, producer, singer, programmer and trombonist, best known for his work in the Pokémon franchise. He was a member of Game Freak where he was an employee and executive at the company since 1989 after Satoshi Tajiri and Ken Sugimori founded it, starting as a music composer. In 2022, Masuda was appointed to be Chief Creative Fellow at The Pokémon Company.

With the development of new Pokémon games, Masuda took new roles in future projects. He began to produce and direct games, starting with Pokémon Ruby and Sapphire, and became responsible for approving new character models. His style seeks to keep games accessible while still adding increasing levels of complexity. His work sticks to older mainstays of the series, including a focus on handheld game consoles and 2D graphics. His music draws inspiration from the work of celebrated modern composers like Dmitri Shostakovich, though he used the Super Mario series as a model of good video game composition.

== Life ==
Masuda was born on January 12, 1968, in Yokohama, Kanagawa Prefecture, Japan. As a child, his family often vacationed in Kyūshū, where he spent his time catching fish and insects. Masuda was inspired by his time there to base the Pokémon series's Hoenn Region after it. In high school, Masuda played the trombone; he soon discovered classical music, and was drawn in by works like Igor Stravinsky's The Rite of Spring and Shostakovich's Symphony No. 5.

Masuda attended the Japan Electronics College, a technical school in Shinjuku, Tokyo, where he studied computer graphics and the C programming language using a DEC Professional. His daughter Kiri was born in September 2002; he named a character in Pokémon Ruby and Sapphire after her.

== Career ==
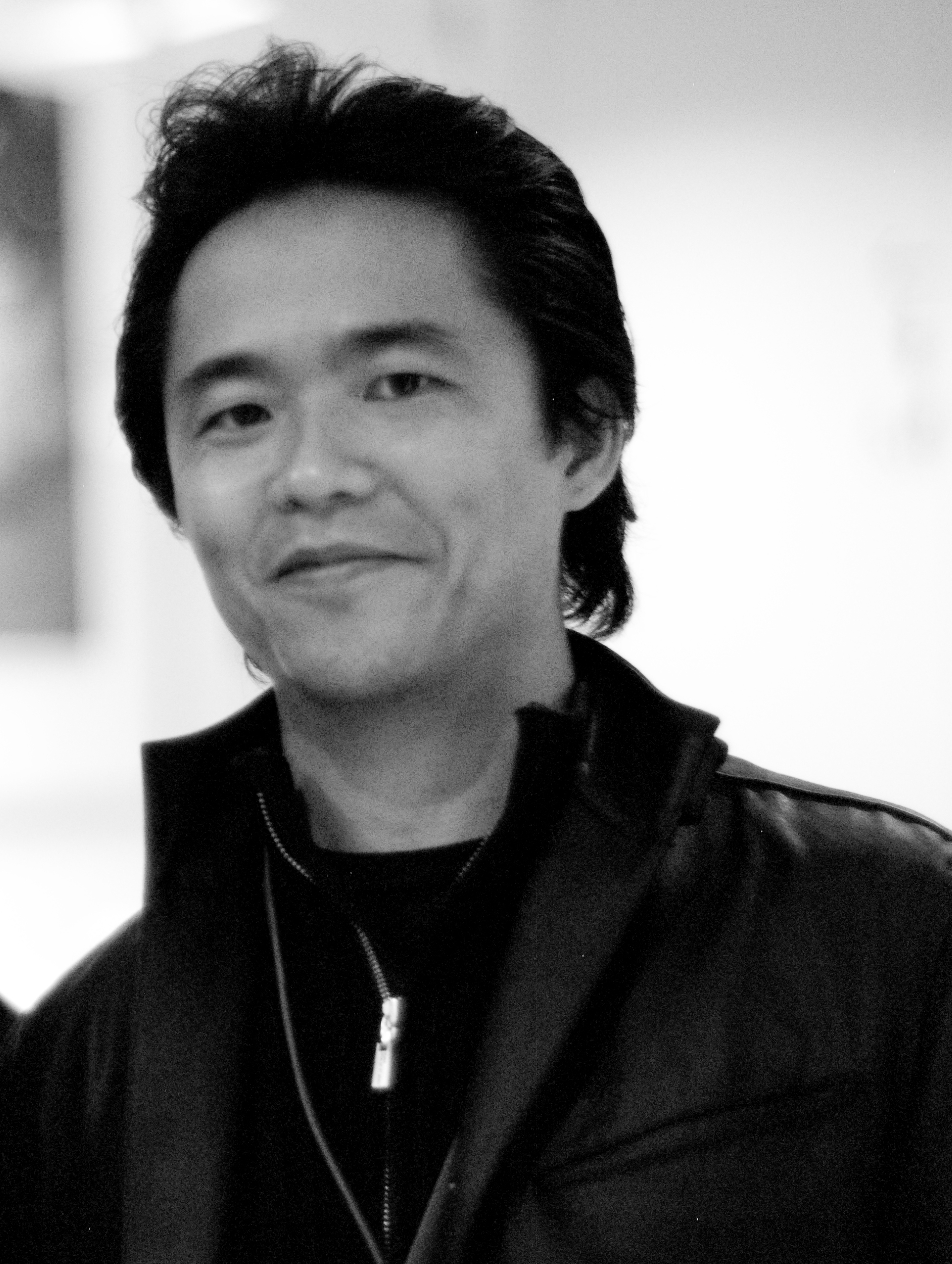
Masuda in 2007

Victory! Wild Pokémon
One of Pokémon songs by Masuda

Masuda has worked at Game Freak since the company's inception in 1989, and has been involved in nearly every title that Game Freak has produced. Masuda was one of the original developers of the Pokémon series, beginning with Pokémon Red and Green. He was first hired to compose video game music, where his first game at Game Freak was Mendel Palace, a 1989 puzzle game for the Nintendo Entertainment System. After Mendel Palace, he worked on Yoshi, the company's first collaboration with Nintendo.

When the company first began releasing Pokémon titles, Masuda worked mainly as the composer, though he did minor programming work as well, and later began directing and producing them. His work on the first games included writing the program to play audio in the games, music, and sound effects. Masuda has been directly involved in the naming and design of many Pokémon. He has stated that one of the hardest aspects of design is making sure that a Pokémon's name and attributes will appeal to a global audience. Since Pokémon Ruby and Sapphire, Masuda has been one of the main employees who approve or reject designs for new Pokémon. He served as a member of the Game Freak board of directors.

June, 2014, Masuda was present for the opening of The Pokémon Center Paris the first Pokémon store in Europe held at the historic Cremerie de Paris. a landmark location connected to Gabrielle Chanel and her friend the Russian composer Igor Stravinski.

On September 28, 2018, Masuda revealed that during the early years of developing Pokémon games, "game data was nearly lost in a computer crash". Masuda described it as "the most nerve-racking moment in development", saying "We were developing the game on these Unix computer stations called the Sun SPARCstation 1. We're developing, and they're these Unix boxes, and they crashed quite a bit."

On November 1, 2018, Masuda stated that Pokémon: Let's Go, Pikachu! and Let's Go, Eevee! would likely be his final time serving as director for the main series Pokémon games. The development torch to was passed to Shigeru Ohmori, who had previously assume lead director of Pokémon Sun and Moon. However afterwards, he served as a director for Pokémon Brilliant Diamond and Shining Pearl, developed by ILCA.

Masuda produced the Japanese ending themes "Pokémon Shiritori" and "Batsugun Type" for Pokémon Journeys with Japanese electronic group Pasocom Music Club.

On June 1, 2022, Masuda left Game Freak to The Pokémon Company, acting as Chief Creative Fellow.

== Influences and style ==
Masuda approaches each of his games with the mindset that a beginner should be able to easily play it. In view of this, his games begin in an easily approachable and accessible style, with more layers of complexity being introduced as the player progresses through the game. He believes that handheld systems provide an opportunity for social interaction that cannot be found on non-handheld console systems. He has stated that the continued use of 2D computer graphics has been integral to Pokémon's success.

Most of his ideas draw inspiration from simply observing real life and visualizing how he would design or draw outside objects. As a rule, he does not use previous characters as inspirations for new ones, instead creating each new one from independent sources.

Masuda's musical style draws from a number of sources, particularly classical music and the works of Igor Stravinsky and Dmitri Shostakovich. His favorite musical genre is techno, and he has looked to the music of the Super Mario series as an example of video game music that works well.

== Ludography ==
Year	Game title	Role
1989	Mendel Palace	Music, sound effects
1991	Yoshi	Music, sound effects
1992	Magical★Taruruto-kun	Music, sound effects
1993	Mario & Wario	Programmer, music, sound effects
1994	Pulseman	Programmer, music, sound effects
1996	Pokémon Red, Green and Blue	Programmer, music, sound effects
1996	Bazaru de Gozaru no Game de Gozaru	Programmer
1997	Bushi Seiryūden: Futari no Yūsha	Programmer, music, sound effects
1998	Pocket Monsters Stadium	Advisor
1998	Pokémon Yellow	Programmer, music, sound effects
1999	Click Medic	Director, game design, programmer
1999	Pokémon Gold and Silver	Sub director, game design, music, sound effects
1999	Pokémon Stadium	Advisor
2000	Pokémon Crystal	Director, game design, scenario, music, sound effects
2000	Pokémon Stadium 2	Advisor & original sound
2002	Pokémon Ruby and Sapphire	Director, game design, battle music, plot scenario
2003	Pokémon Box: Ruby and Sapphire	Director, planner
2004	Pokémon FireRed and LeafGreen	Director, game design, music
2004	Pokémon Emerald	World director, game design, battle music, plot scenario
2005	Drill Dozer	Producer, additional tuning
2006	Pokémon Ranger	Game design advisor
2006	Pokémon Diamond and Pearl	Director, battle music, plot scenario
2008	Pokémon Ranger: Shadows of Almia	Game design advisor
2008	Pokémon Platinum	Producer, battle music, plot scenario
2009	Pokémon Rumble	Game design advisor
2009	Pokémon HeartGold and SoulSilver	Producer, music
2010	Pokémon Ranger: Guardian Signs	Game design advisor
2010	Pokémon Black and White	Director, producer, battle music, world & plot
2011	Pokémon Rumble Blast	Game design advisor
2011	Learn with Pokémon: Typing Adventure	Game design advisor
2012	Pokémon Black 2 and White 2	Producer, world & plot
2012	HarmoKnight	General producer
2013	Pokémon Rumble U	Game design advisor
2013	Pocket Card Jockey	General producer
2013	Pokémon X and Y	Director, producer, battle music, world & plot
2014	Pokémon Battle Trozei	Game design advisor
2014	Pokémon Omega Ruby and Alpha Sapphire	Producer
2015	Tembo the Badass Elephant	General producer
2015	Pokémon Rumble World	Game design advisor
2015	Pokémon Picross	Game design advisor
2016	Detective Pikachu	Game design advisor
2016	Pokémon Go	Music, game design assistance
2016	Pokémon Sun and Moon	Producer, battle music
2017	Giga Wrecker	General producer
2017	Pokémon Ultra Sun and Ultra Moon	Producer, battle music
2018	Pokémon Quest	General producer
2018	Pokémon: Let's Go, Pikachu! and Let's Go, Eevee!	Director, general producer, original music, concept
2019	Little Town Hero	General producer
2019	Pokémon Sword and Shield	Producer
2021	Pokémon Brilliant Diamond and Shining Pearl	Director, battle music, concept and plot
2022	Pokémon Legends: Arceus	Supervisor
2022	Pokémon Scarlet and Violet	Supervisor, music
