= Ken Sugimori =

Japanese video game creator and artist (born 1966)

- 杉森 建
- Born: January 27, 1966 (age 60); Fukuoka, Japan
- Occupations: Video game artist, director, game designer, illustrator
- Employer: Game Freak (1989–present)
- Known for: Pokémon series Pulseman; Drill Dozer

Ken Sugimori (Japanese: 杉森 建, Hepburn: Sugimori Ken; born January 27, 1966) is a Japanese video game designer, illustrator, manga artist, director, and co-founder of Game Freak alongside Satoshi Tajiri. He is best known as the primary character designer and art director for the Pokémon franchise. Sugimori is also credited with the art direction for other titles, including Pulseman. Sugimori drew and finalized most of the original 151 Pokémon. He also co-directed Ruby and Sapphire, Diamond and Pearl and Black and White, as well as worked on various Pokémon films, trading cards, and other games like the Super Smash Bros. series.

== Career ==
From early 1981 until 1986, Sugimori illustrated a gaming fanzine called Game Freak, which had been started by Satoshi Tajiri. Sugimori discovered the magazine in a dōjinshi shop, and decided to get involved. Eventually, the two decided to pitch an arcade game design idea to Namco; they reworked Game Freak into a development company and produced Mendel Palace. Sugimori is best known as the character designer and art director for the Pokémon franchise and designed a large majority of the first 151 Pokémon with Atsuko Nishida, Motofumi Fujiwara, Shigeki Morimoto, and Satoshi Ota. He has worked on the various Pokémon movies, trading cards, and other games.

For Pokémon Black and White, Sugimori directed a team of 17 people in designing new characters for the games, though he always drew the final designs. He drew much of his inspiration from observing animals in aquariums and zoos. Sugimori has also written and illustrated original manga, including one which was distributed with pre-orders of Pokémon Mystery Dungeon: Explorers of Time and Explorers of Darkness. When he begins a new character, his process normally involves making a rough sketch, then tracing it onto film paper while polishing it and making the illustration more professional looking. After that, he draws the character many times, changing its proportions until he is satisfied. When designing a new Pokémon, Sugimori stated that "I do feel that I always want to show new Pokémon that people have never seen before. To do that, I think of ways that I can surprise the players."

== Works ==
=== Video games ===
Year	Game title	Role
1989	Mendel Palace	Character designer
1991	Smart Ball	Game designer, character designer
1991	Yoshi	Graphic designer
1992	Magical★Taruruto-kun	Director, game designer, graphic designer
1993	Mario & Wario	Character designer
1994	Pulseman	Director, game designer, graphic designer
1996	Pokémon Red, Green and Blue	Character designer, Pokémon designer
1996	Bazaar de Gosāru no Game de Gosāru	Graphic designer
1997	Bushi Seiryūden: Futari no Yūsha	Graphic designer
1998	Pokémon Yellow	Character designer, Pokémon designer
1999	Click Medic	Graphics support
1999	Pokémon Gold and Silver	Graphics director, Pokémon designer
2000	Pokémon Crystal	Graphics director, Pokémon designer
2002	Pokémon Ruby and Sapphire	Art director, Pokémon designer, graphic designer
2004	Pokémon FireRed and LeafGreen	Art director, Pokémon designer, graphic designer
2004	Pokémon Emerald	Art director, Pokémon designer, graphic designer
2004	Pokémon Dash	Package illustration
2005	Drill Dozer	Director, game designer
2005	Pokémon Mystery Dungeon: Red and Blue Rescue Team	Package illustration
2006	Pokémon Diamond and Pearl	Art director, Pokémon designer, graphic designer
2007	Pokémon Mystery Dungeon: Explorers of Time and Darkness	Package illustration
2008	My Pokémon Ranch	Hayley character designer
2008	Pokémon Platinum	Art director, Pokémon designer, graphic designer
2009	Pokémon Mystery Dungeon: Explorers of Sky	Package illustration
2009	Pokémon Rumble	Game design advisor
2009	Pokémon HeartGold and SoulSilver	Pokémon designer, graphic supervisor
2010	Pokémon Black and White	2D art director, Pokémon designer
2012	Pokémon Conquest	Game design advisor
2012	Pokémon Black 2 and White 2	Pokémon designer
2012	HarmoKnight	Advisor
2013	Pocket Card Jockey	Advisor
2013	Pokémon X and Y	Character art director, Pokémon design director
2014	Pokémon Omega Ruby and Alpha Sapphire	Character art director, Pokémon design director
2014	Sega 3D Reprint Archives	Package illustration
2015	Tembo the Badass Elephant	Advisor
2015	Pokémon Super Mystery Dungeon	Package illustration
2015	Sega 3D Classics Collection	Package illustration
2016	Pokémon Sun and Moon	Pokémon designer, lead trainer graphic designer
2017	Giga Wrecker	Advisor
2017	Pokémon Ultra Sun and Ultra Moon	Pokémon designer, design art
2018	Pokémon Quest	Supervisor
2018	Pokémon: Let's Go, Pikachu! and Let's Go, Eevee!	Creative supervisor
2019	Little Town Hero	Supervisor
2019	Pokémon Sword and Shield	Concept Design & Planning, Supervisor
2019	Sakura Wars	Peanut character designer
2022	Pokémon Legends: Arceus	Supervisor
2022	Pokémon Scarlet and Violet	Supervisor
2023	Pokémon Sleep	Pokémon Settings Supervision
2023	Pocket Card Jockey: Ride On!	Senior Advisor
2025	Pokémon Legends: Z-A	Supervisor
2026	Pokémon Champions	Supervisor
2026	Pokémon Pokopia	Supervisor
2026	Beast of Reincarnation	Supervisor

=== Card games ===
- Pokémon Trading Card Game: main card artist

=== Anime ===
- Pokémon (anime): character design
- Pokémon: The First Movie: original character design
- Pokémon: The Movie 2000: original character design
- Pokémon 3: The Movie: conceptual character artist
- Pokémon 4Ever: conceptual character artist
- Pokémon Heroes: conceptual character artist

=== Manga ===
- Super Girl Namuko (One-shot published in Shōnen Sunday Zōkan July 15, 1984 issue)
- Dragon Blaster (One-shot published in Weekly Shōnen Sunday 1986 issue no. 44)
- Quinty (Mendel Palace)
- Jerry Boy (Smart Ball)
- Valkyrie no Bōken Gaiden: Futari no Megami (The Adventure of Valkyrie Gaiden: Two Goddess)
- Screw Breaker Gōshin Dorirurero (Drill Dozer)
- Pokémon Fushigi no Danjon Toki no Tankentai Yami no Tankentai (Pokémon Mystery Dungeon: Explorers of Time and Explorers of Darkness)
- Shin Maido Osawagaseshimasu
