= Drill Dozer =

2005 video game

- North American box art
- Developer: Game Freak
- Publisher: Nintendo
- Director: Ken Sugimori
- Artist: Hironobu Yoshida
- Composer: Go Ichinose
- Platform: Game Boy Advance
- Release: JP: September 22, 2005; NA: February 6, 2006
- Genres: Platformer, action
- Mode: Single-player

Drill Dozer (Note: Known in Japan as Screw Breaker Gōshin Drillero (Japanese: スクリューブレイカー 轟振(ごうしん)どりるれろ, Hepburn: Sukuryū Bureikā Gōshin Dorirurero)) is a platformer video game developed by Game Freak and published by Nintendo for the Game Boy Advance (GBA). Directed by Ken Sugimori, the game stars Jill and her mech Drill Dozer, which has a drill that the player can rotate in both directions to fight enemies, drill into certain surfaces, and screw objects. Sugimori aimed to make an action game that does not use traditional types of combat, and was inspired by the concept of a tokusatsu monster who could drill through anything. He also wished to make the drill not just pushing a button, but instead using one of two buttons to activate the drill (either drilling forward or in reverse). When drilling, the built-in rumble pack will activate, a feature suggested by Nintendo.

Sugimori wanted to make the protagonist a little girl, as he felt it would be more unusual than a larger male character piloting the mech. Artist Hironobu Yoshida, who struggled when drawing female characters, found her difficult to design, but managed to make progress when he was inspired to design her hair after roll cakes, having his wife hold one on either side of her head. The game was released on September 22, 2005, in Japan, and on February 6, 2006, in North America. It was initially unreleased in Europe, only arriving there upon being released on the Wii U's Virtual Console in all three regions in 2016.

Drill Dozer has been generally well received, regarded as one of the best GBA games by multiple writers. Its level design and drill-focused gameplay was particularly well-received, credited as being unique and setting it apart from other platformers. The music's reception was more mixed; while some enjoyed it, others found it repetitive. The game ended up being a commercial failure, attributed by multiple authors to it coinciding with the Nintendo DS release and poor marketing. This led it to being viewed as a hidden gem.

== Gameplay ==
Gameplay screenshot of Drill Dozer, showing protagonist Jill drilling a block. The UI indicator for the drilling takes up a significant portion of the screen.

Drill Dozer is a 2D side-scrolling action-platformer where the player controls the protagonist Jill, who pilots a mech called a Drill Dozer. The player uses the Game Boy Advance (GBA) shoulder buttons to control the direction of the drill, with one button drilling clockwise and the other counter-clockwise. When the drill is used, a user interface appears and the built-in rumble pack activates. This is used for different functions, including tightening or untightening screws, destroying blocks, and fighting enemies. These blocks have different functions; while some vary only by thickness, others have their own mechanics, such as jelly blocks, which can be used to jump backwards off of them to reach a platform. The drill can also be used to drill through tunnels, using the two buttons to go forward or backwards. Certain objects will be color coded, communicating whether they require the drill to work forward or in reverse.

The game spans more than a dozen levels featuring blocks, enemies, and environmental obstacles. At some points during each level, Jill is ambushed, and the player is required to beat multiple enemies before proceeding. As the player progresses in each level, they can find sprockets that, once collected, allow the player to shift up to the next gear, done by pushing the respective shoulder button when prompted. This allows Jill to drill through harder blocks or continue drilling for longer. When finding the second sprocket in the level, the player is now able to drill indefinitely. Once the level is complete, the Drill Dozer loses these sprockets, requiring them to be collected in the next level. Throughout the level, the player collects a currency that can be spent at a shop in the game's main menu on different items, including health tanks, special drill bits, and maps to unlock bonus levels. These drill bits are capable of destroying blocks that were previously unable to be destroyed.

In some levels, the Drill Dozer is able to use a special upgrade that lets it fly or traverse bodies of water. At the end of each level, the player faces off against a boss that is battled with the drill. In addition to playing through the levels, the player is tasked with increasing Jill's reputation as a thief, which is accomplished by collecting treasures across the levels. Upon beating the game, an increased difficulty mode is unlocked.

When played on the Game Boy Player, the rumble functionality extends to the GameCube controller. The rumble is similarly retained in the game's digital re-release via the Virtual Console on the Wii U.

== Plot ==
Drill Dozer follows a young girl named Jill, the daughter of the leader of a bandit gang known as the Red Dozers. Her father was ambushed by a rival gang known as the Skullkers, stealing a Red Diamond that belonged to Jill's mother, leading Jill to mount a mech called a Drill Dozer to retrieve it and defeat the Skullkers. Along the way, she finds four other diamonds, which affected the behavior of people and objects, such as the Dark Diamond, which gave Crooge, the alien-like leader of the Skullkers his power. Once Jill destroys the Dark Diamond, Croog's alien face falls off and he runs away crying. Jill recovers the Red Diamond and is appointed as the new boss of the Red Dozers by her father.

== Development ==
Drill Dozer was developed by Game Freak and directed by Ken Sugimori, the first game he directed since Pulseman in 1994, approximately 11 years prior. Development began after Pokémon Ruby and Sapphire, while Pokémon Emerald, an upgraded version of Ruby and Sapphire, and Pokémon FireRed and LeafGreen, remakes of Pokémon Red and Green, were in development. Sugimori stated that because they were upgrade versions, they required less staff to work on them, and thus had the opportunity to work on something else. He was also inspired to begin production due to staff's interest in creating a non-Pokémon game, particularly an action-based one. Sugimori stated that he was concerned about the professional development of Game Freak staff who have only worked on Pokémon games prior to this; in turn, he focused on doing art for the game, while most of the gameplay and programming was handled by younger staff members. Development started with around 4-5 staff members.

Around this time, Sugimori had been considering a drill-based game, stating that he wanted to make something that wasn't focused on conventional combat while still featuring aggressive gameplay. Sugimori imagined a tokusatsu monster that could drill through anything to conceive the gameplay, stating that while it was not realistic, it was a cool concept that could appeal to kids. He also discussed how drills in other games tended to simply be tools for digging, stating his desire to emphasize the rotating aspect of a drill. Early on, it was decided to assign drilling to the two shoulder buttons, deciding it would be interesting to allow the player to rotate in both directions. The drill gauge was initially small and in the corner, but Sugimori felt that this distracted from the character, opting to make the gauge much more centered and visible to allow the player to see both at the same time. The rumble pack functionality was added late in development; Sugimori expected that it could be made possible through the GameCube accessory Game Boy Player, but Nintendo suggested that it have a built-in rumble pack instead. He stated that it was challenging to implement, but was accomplished by creating a custom cartridge. Near the end of development, executive producer Satoshi Tajiri influenced the team with suggestions, including adding the subtitle to the Japanese name in order to give it more "pizazz".

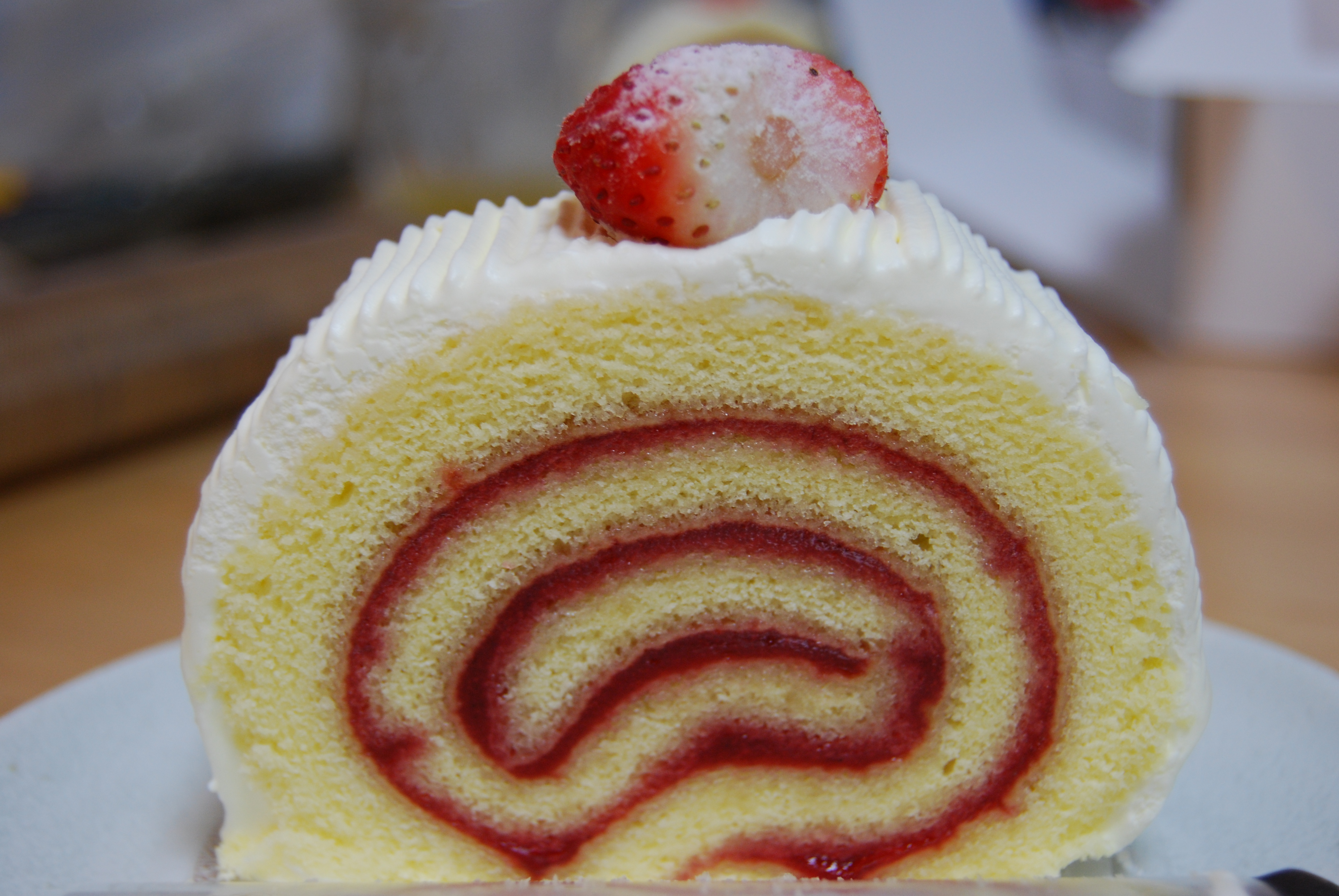
Jill concept art by Ken Sugimori, featuring hair inspired by roll cakes

Character designs were managed by 2D graphic designer Hironobu Yoshida, who also handled the design of the drill gauge user interface element. Sugimori initially conceived a typical hero archetype with a drill for an arm, but this concept was scrapped when they opted to go with a mech. Sugimori wanted to ensure that the mech pilot had a "frail quality", choosing to make the protagonist a little girl. He reasoned that since the game involved piloting a mech, it would be more interesting to use a "cutesy girl" instead of a "buff-looking" man. Yoshida was initially opposed idea of a female protagonist due to him finding women difficult to draw; in protest, he drew her with "boy-like eyebrows". Yoshida stated that his initial concepts for Jill were completely different from her final design. One night, he went home and ate a roll cake, deciding to use it as the inspiration for her hair. He had his wife hold two of these cakes on the sides of her head, using her as his model for Jill. He used food as inspiration for other characters as well. The Drill Dozer mech originally had a "worker robot" design, but they wanted to make it look more cyborg-like, as if Jill becomes one with it when she's piloting it. The music was composed by Go Ichinose, who worked on the Pokémon games and reused samples from the GBA games.

Game Freak enlisted staff who did not work on the game to test the game, watching to see if they got stuck or confused. When this happened, they would make changes to make it more obvious where to go, something Sugimori struggled with in the past. He stated that he aspired to avoid "cheap deaths" or making it too hard by finding a comfortable balance between too easy and too hard. He avoided adding an easy mode, believing that it could give people a bad feeling similar to someone letting another person win. Sugimori stated that he was nervous about presenting it to Nintendo, but was relieved once he saw them understand the shoulder button-based controls. He stated that he had 10 years of ideas he wanted to implement, believing he successfully added them in Drill Dozer.

=== Localization ===
The game was localized by Nintendo of America's Treehouse division, specifically by Thomas Connery, who translated the text into English, and Eric Peterson, who rewrote and polished it afterward. Peterson stated that much of his time was spent rewriting jokes or lines to make them funny or understandable for English audiences. He was also responsible for naming every character, stage, and room in the game. Peterson stated that the developers infused protagonist Jill with a lot of personality and attitude, saying that her actions were what defined her character. He described her as cute and tough, as well as unapologetic about it. The English version also changed different unlockable outfits of Jill's to make them more themed after Game Freak characters, such as the female protagonist from Pokémon FireRed and LeafGreen, the protagonist of Click Medic, and the protagonist of Pulseman.

== Release ==
Drill Dozer was revealed at E3 2005, originally titled Screw Breaker, a translation of its Japanese title. At E3 2005, it was awarded "Most Innovative Design" by IGN and GBA "Game of the Show" by Nintendo World Report. It would later be published by Nintendo in Japan on September 22, 2005, and in North America on February 6, 2006. It remained unreleased in Europe until January 2016, when the game was added to the Wii U's Virtual Console service in North America and Europe.

== Reception ==
Reception

Aggregate score
Aggregator	Score
Metacritic	81/100

Review scores
Publication	Score
Edge	7/10
Eurogamer	8/10
Game Informer	7.75/10
GameSpot	8.2/10
GameSpy	4/5
IGN	8/10
Nintendo Life	8/10
Nintendo World Report	9/10
Play	8.5/10
Pocket Gamer	4.5/5

Drill Dozer received generally favorable reviews according to video game review aggregator website Metacritic. Upon its release, Electronic Gaming Monthly staff awarded it Game of the Month, alongside the Nintendo DS game Age of Empires: The Age of Kings. The game was awarded GBA Game of the Year by Nintendo Power in 2006, and it was runner-up for GameSpot's GBA Game of the Year award. Nintendo World Report staff named it the best GBA game of 2006, stating that while 2006 was a weak year for GBA games, it would have been a contender even in strong years. It has been listed as one of the best Game Boy Advance games by Nintendo Life, GamesRadar+, Time Extension, Retro Gamer, and Nintendo World Report. IGN also ranked it among the best Nintendo games. It was considered a hidden gem by Nintendojo and Nintendo Power, while Den of Geek regarded it as one of the most underrated GBA games.

IGN writer Mark Bozon considered the drill-centric gameplay an original idea and what makes the game so unique, stating that while it had the potential to become dull, the game keeps things interesting. He argued that because the game was focused on one concept for its mechanics, some players may find it lacking. Hardcore Gaming 101's Neil Foster found the focus on the shoulder buttons unique, but expressed disappointment that the shift upgrades collected during the levels are lost once the level is finished. He believed that going back to the basic drilling made levels feel slower to start, though he argued that starting slow helped levels introduce new enemies and block types. He was also critical of the flying and water levels, saying that that mass of the Drill Dozer mech meant that the player would often run into obstacles due to struggling to slow down. Foster criticized the user interface, disliking that the drill user interface took up so much of the screen for so much of the game. He praised the level design, stating that it was worth playing whether it was to just beat the game or get all treasures. The rumble pack was identified as a highlight of the game, with Polygon writer Allegra Frank stating that it helped make the game memorable. Bozon felt that, while it was not as strong as the Nintendo DS' rumble pack, it was still impressive, especially in a Game Boy Micro. Nintendo World Report's Karl Castaneda praised the game for utilizing the drill for so much, stating that the rumble pack made the drilling mechanic come across better.

The level design was praised by Neil Foster, who called it "impeccable". Mark Bozon also offered it praise, stating that the level design did a good job of teasing players with alternate routes and providing an "overwhelming sense of freedom". Pocket Gamer writer Jon Jordan felt that it did a good job of easing the player into understanding the mechanics, stating that players would learn to pull off very difficult maneuvers that would have seemed "impossible" at the start. He also praised the game for being fun to play, particularly the drilling mechanics. It was considered to be a clever platform game by Eurogamer writer Tom Bramwell, who stated that the game starts out simple and becomes more complex without changing the basic idea of the game. He found several of its ideas particularly inventive, including the ability to hop backwards from a jelly block to reach a new platform, stating that it was "like a new platforming language". He also appreciated how varied and surprising the levels were. A lack of backtracking has been identified as a positive quality of the game by Bramwell and Bozon. Writing for GameSpot, Bob Colayco praised the game for frequently introducing interesting platforming, stating that it helps keep the game fresh. He also enjoyed the flying and underwater levels, believing that the designers have successfully translated the gameplay to these formats.

Game Informer writer Matt Miller compared it to NES games, stating that, like games of that era, Drill Dozer had "brief moments of discovery punctuated by clever gameplay and a unique gimmick", ultimately resulting in a game he found fun. Writing for Play magazine, Dave Halverson also compared it to 8-bit Nintendo games, stating that it felt as original as the games they made back then. He specifically drew comparisons between it and NES games like Bionic Commando, Blaster Master, and Kid Icarus, viewing it as a particularly addictive game. Edge staff felt that while it may seem difficult to grasp as a gameplay mechanic, they felt that the drill-focused gameplay was undeniably a successful decision. They believed that it reflected a confidence among Game Freak staff, believing that the game owed inspiration to Metroid for its design and to the company Treasure for its humor. GameSpy writer Phil Theobald felt that the level design was particularly excellent, complimenting the drilling gameplay for being able to do so much with limited abilities. He expressed disappointment with how short and easy the game was, and also wished that he could replay the levels with a max power Drill Dozer.

The visuals received praise, with Karl Castaneda that the game's "toon-like sprites [were] vibrant and colorful" and that the environments were detailed, believing that it matched up to 2D visuals on the Nintendo DS. Bob Colayco felt its art style was fun, comparing it to the Powerpuff Girls cartoon. It was awarded best graphics for a GBA game by Nintendo World Report staff in 2016, who stated that its visuals was a mixture of "style, color, and fluidity". The music's reception was more mixed. Neil Foster praised the music, stating that its "guitar-twanging tracks" were the highlight and that the music was reminiscent of the GBA Pokémon games due to having the same composer. He felt that the music was written in a more "bombastic" way that fit an action game better. Mark Bozon also enjoyed the music, calling it remarkable and stating that it would fit in well in a Mega Man game. He stated that the soundtrack had "inspired techno music that capture[d] the mood of scripted events and battles alike". Colayco praised both the music and sound effects, stating that the soundtrack has a "superhero motif" that worked well with the pace of the gameplay. Karl Castaneda considered the sound design average, stating that the soundtrack felt like it had the "same high-tempo rock melody" constantly. He was more complimentary of the sound effects, feeling that the game had a high production quality. Matt Miller was also critical of the music, stating that he could do without a soundtrack that sounded like it was written by "drug-induced chipmunks".

=== Retrospective discussion ===
Despite reviewing well, Drill Dozer was considered unsuccessful commercially, with sales poor enough to make a sequel unlikely. In its launch week, Drill Dozer sold approximately 6,000 copies, going on to sell more than 22,000 copies. It ultimately ranked as the 94th best-selling GBA game in Japan. It became a cult hit according to Automaton writer Ayuo Kawase, with 4gamer writer Kentaro Hochi noting that while it could be commonly found at stores around release, it eventually became a premium item. According to Real Sound writer Sheloop, Drill Dozer was not well-known at release, stating that even those who would have been alive when it came out appeared to be unsure what it was. He attributed its lack of popularity to being released near the end of the GBA's lifespan, as well as coinciding with the release of the Nintendo DS and the 20th anniversary of Super Mario Bros. Neil Foster found it surprising that a Game Freak game performed so poorly, speculating that it was due to a combination of a lack of advertising, the Nintendo DS, and Nintendo not exclaiming that it was from the makers of Pokémon. Phil Theobald also felt that the Nintendo DS impacted its sales negatively, expressing disappointment that it was not more successful due to how "outstanding" he found it. Retro Gamer writer Kim Wild felt it was "criminally overlooked" and should be discussed in the same breath as titles she considered classics, like games from the Mario, The Legend of Zelda, and Pokémon series. She recommend that anyone who enjoyed unique platformers should play it.

Drill Dozer was suggested by GamesRadar writer Matt Bradford to be featured in the 3D Classics line of Nintendo 3DS games, stating that it would be a good opportunity for it to be rediscovered. Nintendo Life writers Gavin Lane and Alana Hagues hoped to see Drill Dozer added to the Nintendo Switch via its Nintendo Switch Online service. Its Wii U re-release was well-received by USgamer writer Bob Mackey, who stated that the creative spark behind Pokémon could be found in this game. He felt that it likely did not get the attention it deserved, and said that it was worth buying for the price. Nintendo Life writer Dave Frear appreciated the rumble pack functionality in the Wii U release, stating that it was unusual to play with a Wii Classic Controller due to the lack of rumble in it.

== Legacy ==
In the 2008 video game Super Smash Bros. Brawl, Jill and her Drill Dozer appear as a summonable character that can aid a player against other players. Nintendo Switch 2 Welcome Tour, a game created to explain the mechanics of the Nintendo Switch 2, features an in-game exhibit of Nintendo games with vibration functions, which displayed Drill Dozer's box and cartridge. The video game Giga Wrecker, also developed by Game Freak, was described by director Masayuki Onoue as having the essence of Drill Dozer. It has been compared to Drill Dozer by critics at multiple websites, including Automaton and IGN Japan.
