= Pokémon Ruby and Sapphire =

2002 video games

Pokémon Ruby; Pokémon Sapphire
- North American box art for Pokémon Ruby and Pokémon Sapphire depicting the legendary Pokémon Groudon and Kyogre respectively
- Developer: Game Freak
- Publishers: JP: The Pokémon Company; WW: Nintendo
- Director: Junichi Masuda
- Producers: Hiroyuki Jinnai; Takehiro Izushi; Hiroaki Tsuru
- Designers: Shigeki Morimoto; Junichi Masuda; Shigeru Ohmori
- Programmer: Tetsuya Watanabe
- Artist: Ken Sugimori
- Writers: Toshinobu Matsumiya; Akihito Tomisawa
- Composers: Go Ichinose; Junichi Masuda; Morikazu Aoki
- Series: Pokémon
- Platform: Game Boy Advance
- Release: JP: November 21, 2002; NA: March 19, 2003; AU: April 3, 2003; EU: July 25, 2003
- Genre: Role-playing
- Modes: Single-player and multiplayer with link cable

Pokémon Ruby Version (Note: Japanese: ポケットモンスター ルビー, Hepburn: Poketto Monsutā Rubī; lit. "Pocket Monsters: Ruby") and Pokémon Sapphire Version (Note: Japanese: ポケットモンスター サファイア, Hepburn: Poketto Monsutā Safaia; lit. "Pocket Monsters: Sapphire") are 2002 role-playing video games developed by Game Freak for the Game Boy Advance. Although the games were published by Nintendo internationally in 2003, The Pokémon Company published them in Japan in late 2002, making them the first mainline games to have this distinction, as well as the second games to have it overall, after Pokémon Card GB2: Great Rocket-Dan Sanjō! They are the first installments in the third generation, or the "advanced generation", of the Pokémon video game series, and in turn the Pokémon media franchise. A third version, Pokémon Emerald Version, was released two years later in each region. Remakes of the two games, titled Pokémon Omega Ruby and Alpha Sapphire, were released for the Nintendo 3DS worldwide in November 2014, exactly twelve years to the date of the original Ruby and Sapphire release date, with the exception of Europe, where they released a week later.

The gameplay is mostly unchanged from the previous games; the player controls the main character from an overhead perspective, and the controls are largely the same as those of previous games. As with previous games, the main objectives are to catch all of the Pokémon in the games and defeat the Elite Four and the Pokémon League Champion; also like their predecessors, the games' main subplot involves the player character defeating a criminal organization that attempts to take over the region. New features, such as double battles, Pokémon abilities, Pokémon Contests, and 135 new Pokémon were added. Owing to the increased capabilities of the Game Boy Advance, four players may be connected to each other at a time instead of the previous limit of two. Additionally, the games can be connected to an e-Reader or other third-generation Pokémon games.

Ruby and Sapphire received mostly positive reviews; praise was given to the new features and Pokémon designs, though critics were divided in their assessment of the games, especially on the gameplay and graphics. Most of the complaints focused on gameplay not changing much in relation to previous generations. With over 16.22 million copies sold, they were a commercial success and became the best-selling game for the Game Boy Advance; however, the games sold less than previous generations with Red and Blue having sold nearly 31 million units worldwide, and Gold and Silver selling over 23.10 million units.

== Gameplay ==
The basic mechanics of Ruby and Sapphire are largely the same as their predecessors. As with all Pokémon games for handheld consoles, the gameplay is in third-person, overhead perspective and consists of three basic screens: a field map, in which the player navigates the main character; a battle screen; and the menu, in which the player configures their party, items, or gameplay settings. Players begin the game with one Pokémon and can capture more using Poké Balls. They can also use their Pokémon to battle other Pokémon. When the player encounters a wild Pokémon or is challenged by a trainer to a battle, the screen switches to a turn-based battle screen where the Pokémon fight. During a battle, the player may use a move, use an item, switch their active Pokémon, or flee, although fleeing is not an option in battles against trainers. All Pokémon have hit points (HP); when a Pokémon's HP is reduced to zero, it faints and cannot battle until it is revived. If the player's Pokémon defeats the opposing Pokémon (causes it to faint), it receives experience points. After accumulating enough experience points, it will level up; most Pokémon evolve into a new species of Pokémon when they reach a certain level.

Apart from battling, capturing Pokémon is the most essential element of Pokémon gameplay. During a battle with a wild Pokémon, the player may use a Poké Ball on them. If successful, the Pokémon will be added to the player's active party, or stored if the player already has the maximum six Pokémon in their party. Factors in the success rate of capture include the HP, status effects such as Paralysis or Sleep, and the strength of the Poké Ball used: the lower the target's HP and the stronger the Poké Ball, the higher the success rate of capture is. Other trainers' Pokémon cannot be captured.

=== New features ===
The most prominent change in the battle mechanics is the introduction of double battles, in which the opposing parties each use two Pokémon at the same time. Consequently, certain Pokémon moves can affect multiple combatants at once. Multi battles were added alongside double battles. They are identical to double battles, but there are two trainers to a side, each controlling one of the two Pokémon sent out. Also new to the games are innate abilities and natures; the former is shared by every Pokémon of a certain species, while the latter may vary among a particular species. Abilities grant their holders certain powers in battle, such as immunity against certain types of moves or strengthening a certain type of move. Natures, like innate abilities, affect the strength of Pokémon in battle; however, they affect the stats of the Pokémon rather than directly affecting the strength of the moves. Another stat introduced in Pokémon Ruby and Sapphire is Condition, an important factor in Pokémon Contests, mini-games in which participants perform moves before a judge. Both Pokémon and their moves have a Condition, which is increased by using Pokéblocks, which are candies made from berries. Secret bases were added as a one-off feature where players could open up a hole in the world and customize the area with various items picked up in-game. Players who linked up with others who set up secret bases were able to battle an NPC version of that trainer within their secret base.

Like Pokémon Gold, Silver, and Crystal, Pokémon Ruby and Sapphire keep track of real-life time; this influences events like tides and berry plant growth. However, unlike their predecessors, Ruby and Sapphire do not differentiate between day and night. Also, due to the differences in the technical specifications of Game Boy link cables and Game Boy Advance link cables, Ruby and Sapphire cannot be linked with Pokémon games of previous generations; one cannot battle with or trade with the previous generations.

=== Connectivity to other devices ===
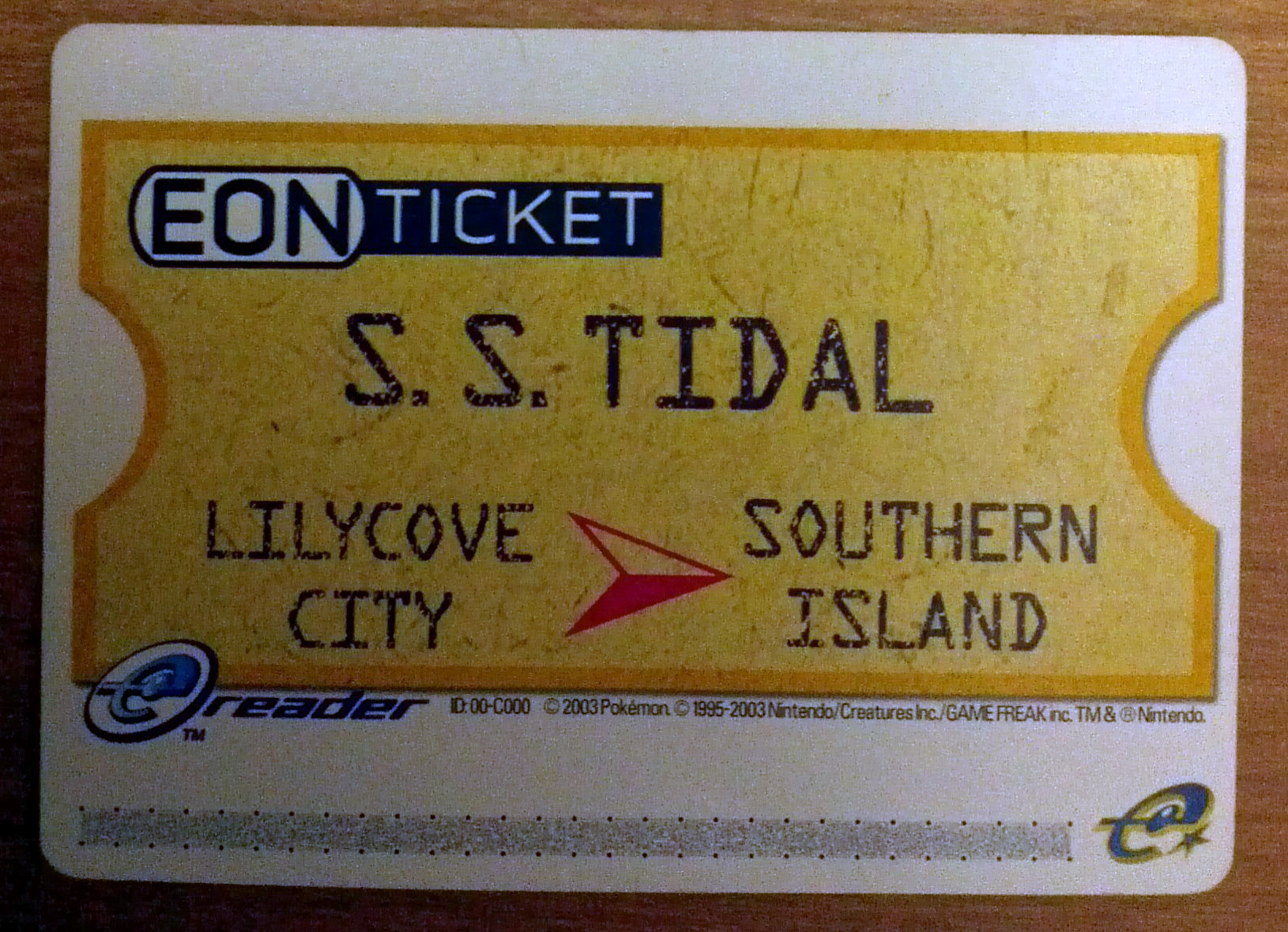
The Eon Ticket could be scanned in by the e-Reader to go and catch either Latios or Latias, depending on the game.

Ruby and Sapphire have limited e-Reader support. Nintendo released Battle-e Cards, a set of e-Reader cards that contained trainer battles in which the player could see previously hidden Pokémon. A special e-Reader card called the Eon Ticket was also released; obtained through the Mystery Gift function, the Ticket allows the player to reach a place called Southern Island. There, the player faces either Latios or Latias, depending on which version of the game is used.

Ruby and Sapphire are also able to connect to the GameCube games Pokémon Colosseum, Pokémon XD: Gale of Darkness and Pokémon Box: Ruby and Sapphire. In the former two, once players reach a certain point in the game, they are able to transfer Pokémon between Colosseum / XD and Ruby / Sapphire. Additionally, those who pre-ordered Colosseum were able to access the Pokémon Jirachi and see a preview of the movie Pokémon: Jirachi Wish Maker. Pokémon Box allows players to store and organize their Pokémon on the GameCube. Also, in the European version of Pokémon Channel, players could receive a Jirachi at a certain point in the game, which they could then transfer over to Ruby or Sapphire.

== Plot ==
=== Setting ===
Ruby and Sapphire are set in the Hoenn Region, designed to be similar to Japan's island of Kyushu if rotated 90°. (pictured below).

Kyushu island, Japan

Pokémon Ruby and Sapphire occur in the Hoenn Region, some distance from the Kanto and Johto Regions featured in previous games. The design of Hoenn was based on the Japanese island and region of Kyushu; however, Hoenn is rotated 90° relative to Kyushu, as Junichi Masuda felt that it would provide a better gameplay balance. Like Kyushu, Hoenn possesses many smaller islands, and part of the region is dominated by sea routes, several of which contain areas where the player can dive underwater.

=== Story ===
Like other Pokémon games, Ruby and Sapphire's gameplay is linear; the main events occur in a fixed order. The protagonist of Pokémon Ruby and Sapphire are Brendan and May, who have recently moved to a small town called Littleroot Town. At the beginning of the games, the player chooses either Treecko, Torchic, or Mudkip to protect Professor Birch, the regional professor, from attacking Poochyena. After defending Birch, the player is taken to his lab and receives the chosen Pokémon as their starter Pokémon. After that, the player encounters May/Brendan, the child of Professor Birch. The player's rival, who appears as the professor's child, is also a Pokémon Trainer and occasionally battles the player. The games' two main goals are defeating the eight Gym Leaders, proving oneself worthy of challenging the Elite Four and Hoenn League Champion to become the new Hoenn League Champion and completing the Pokédex by capturing, evolving, and trading to obtain all 202 Pokémon available between Ruby and Sapphire. It is possible to obtain all 386 Pokémon, but this requires trading with Pokémon FireRed and LeafGreen or Pokémon XD: Gale of Darkness and Pokémon Colosseum.

In addition to the main quest of defeating the Gym Leaders, there are side quests in which the player can aid NPCs by fulfilling tasks, usually by obtaining items. The most prominent subplot involves Team Aqua and Team Magma, crime syndicates who want to use Pokémon to alter the climate of Hoenn: in Ruby, the villains, Team Magma, want to use the legendary Pokémon Groudon to dry up the oceans of Hoenn and increase the region's landmass; in Sapphire, Team Aqua are the villains and they try to use Groudon's counterpart, Kyogre, to flood the landmasses of Hoenn and increase the region's ocean. Prior to facing the eighth Gym Leader, the player has a showdown with Magma or Aqua where the team's leader uses a mystical orb that awakens the slumbering Pokémon, believing it has the power to enthrall their respective target, only for the Pokémon to become enraged and cause catastrophic, region-wide climate changes—a drought in Ruby, and heavy rainfall in Sapphire—until it is defeated or captured by the protagonist. The player's father Norman also introduces them to Wally, a sickly young boy whom the player helps capture a Pokémon to be his companion as he moves away from the big city. Wally eventually overcomes his illness and becomes a successful Pokémon Trainer, ultimately becoming the final challenger the player must face before the Elite Four.

== Development ==
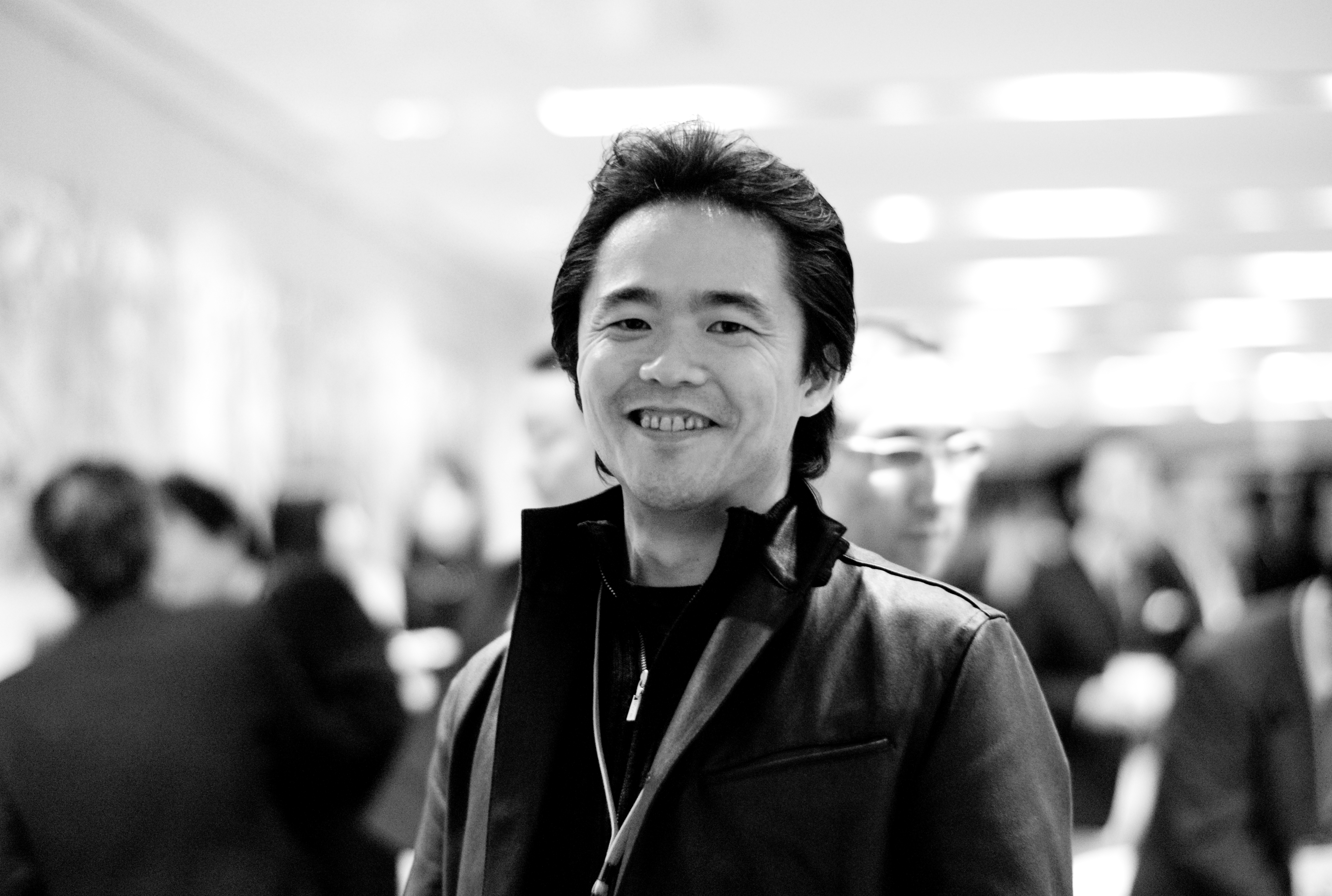
Development director Junichi Masuda

Pokémon Ruby and Sapphire were developed by Game Freak and Nintendo under the direction of Junichi Masuda. As with its predecessors, Ken Sugimori was the art director, although these were the first games in which he did not single-handedly produce all of the art. When asked where his design team came up with the ideas for all of the new Pokémon, Sugimori stated that they got their ideas from past experiences in their childhood involving nature, animals, and the media and then base them on insects. Even looking at the world in a different perspective sometimes provided inspiration for the creatures. "First we select an insect and after that we add essential elements to the insects to make it more like Pokemon, such as adding some hard shape to it, to be more like steel," Sugimori said, describing the process of creating a Pokémon.

As the Game Boy Advance was able to handle enhanced graphics, Ruby and Sapphire were the first games in the series that allowed up to four people to share information at one time, as opposed to the previous limit of two. However, the development team used a more basic graphics engine to keep the game simple and not overly confusing. The team wanted the games to appeal to a large audience, so the game was designed to be easy enough for younger generations of children to play, but new features were added to bring the veteran gamers back.

Masuda stated that the basic philosophy of all Pokémon games is communication; in the Pokémon series, this is manifested in trading and battling with other people. When asked about the new concept of double battles, the developers noted that they tried to focus more on the original one-on-one battles as the main type of competition and only added the double battles as a "new challenge". They stated that if they receive positive feedback about the double battles, the feature may appear more in future generations.

The games were the first in the series that did not contain all of the Pokémon from previous generations. Sugimori stated that the team tried to include all the new Pokémon as well as some from previous generations. When asked about any features that could not be included due to technical restrictions, Masuda noted that he wanted each individual Pokémon to make up to three different cries depending on its mood.

=== Audio ===
Pokémon Ruby and Sapphire soundtrack

Studio album by Junichi Masuda, Go Ichinose and Morikazu Aoki
- Released: April 26, 2003
- Genres: Video game music, soundtrack, audio
- Label: Media Factory
- Producer: Unknown

The audio of Ruby and Sapphire consists entirely of game music and sound effects; all dialogue is on-screen. The music, composed by Junichi Masuda, Go Ichinose and Morikazu Aoki, is completely instrumental except for two tracks with vocals, "Trick Master" and "Slateport City". The soundtrack of the game was released under the Mediafactory label in Japan on April 26, 2003; the album reached #297 on the Oricon charts and charted for one week. Junichi Masuda wrote only battle tunes, Go Ichinose wrote most of the town, route, fanfare & 'Spotted' tunes, whereas Morikazu Aoki did the remainder.

The soundtrack is noted for its heavy use of trumpets, but it also makes heavy use of French horns, strings ensembles, and even pianos.

DISC 1

Disc 1
No.	Track title (Japanese)	Track title (English Translation)	Composer	Arranger
1	タイトルデモ ～ホウエン地方の旅立ち～	Title Demo ~Departure in the Hoenn Region~	Go Ichinose	Go Ichinose
2	タイトルデモ2 ～ダブルバトル～	Title Demo 2 ~Double Battle~	Junichi Masuda	Go Ichinose
3	タイトル ～メインテーマ～	Title ~Main Theme~	Junichi Masuda	Go Ichinose
4	オープニングセレクト	Opening Select	Morikazu Aoki	Morikazu Aoki
5	ミシロタウン	Littleroot Town	Go Ichinose	Go Ichinose
6	オダマキ研究所	Birch Laboratory	Morikazu Aoki	Morikazu Aoki
7	ハルカ	May	Go Ichinose	Go Ichinose
8	たすけてくれ！	Help!	Go Ichinose	Go Ichinose
9	戦闘！野生ポケモン	Battle! Wild Pokémon	Junichi Masuda	Junichi Masuda
10	野生ポケモンに勝利！	Wild Pokémon Defeated!	Junichi Masuda	Morikazu Aoki
11	101番道路	Route 101	Morikazu Aoki	Morikazu Aoki
12	コトキタウン	Pokémon	Morikazu Aoki	Morikazu Aoki
13	ポケモンセンター	Pokémon Center	Junichi Masuda	Go Ichinose
14	回復	Recovery	Junichi Masuda	Morikazu Aoki
15	視線！たんぱんこぞう	Glance! Youngster	Morikazu Aoki	Morikazu Aoki
16	視線！ミニスカート	Glance! Lass	Go Ichinose	Go Ichinose
17	戦闘！トレーナー	Battle! Trainer	Junichi Masuda	Junichi Masuda
18	トレーナーに勝利！	Trainer Defeated!	Junichi Masuda	Go Ichinose
19	レベルアップ	Level Up	Junichi Masuda	Morikazu Aoki
20	トウカシティ	Petalburg City	Morikazu Aoki	Morikazu Aoki
21	連れて行く	Bring Along	Junichi Masuda	Go Ichinose
22	104番道路	Route 104	Go Ichinose	Go Ichinose
23	トウカの森	Petalburg Woods	Morikazu Aoki	Morikazu Aoki
24	マグマ団登場！	Team Magma Appears!	Go Ichinose	Go Ichinose
25	戦闘！アクア・マグマ団	Battle! Team Aqua/Magma	Junichi Masuda	Junichi Masuda
26	アクア・マグマ団に勝利！	Team Aqua/Magma Defeated!	Go Ichinose	Go Ichinose
27	カナズミシティ	Rustboro City	Go Ichinose	Go Ichinose
28	トレーナーズスクール	Trainer's School	Go Ichinose	Go Ichinose
29	海を越えて	Crossing the Sea	Go Ichinose	Go Ichinose
30	ムロタウン	Dewford Town	Go Ichinose	Go Ichinose
31	視線！うきわガール	Glance! Tuber♀	Morikazu Aoki	Morikazu Aoki
32	カイナシティ	Slateport City	Go Ichinose	Go Ichinose
33	海の科学博物館	Oceanic Museum	Junichi Masuda	Morikazu Aoki
34	110番道路	Route 110	Morikazu Aoki	Morikazu Aoki
35	サイクリング	Cycling	Go Ichinose	Go Ichinose
36	ゲームコーナー	Game Corner	Go Ichinose	Go Ichinose
37	当たり！	Success!	Morikazu Aoki	Morikazu Aoki
38	残念	Bad Luck	Morikazu Aoki	Morikazu Aoki
39	BDタイム	BD Time	Morikazu Aoki	Morikazu Aoki
40	大当たり！	Jackpot!	Morikazu Aoki	Morikazu Aoki
41	シダケタウン	Verdanturf Town	Go Ichinose	Go Ichinose
42	113番道路	Route 113	Go Ichinose	Go Ichinose
43	ふたごちゃん	Twins	Go Ichinose	Go Ichinose
44	ハジツゲタウン	Fallarbor Town	Junichi Masuda	Go Ichinose
45	ロープウェイ	Ropeway	Go Ichinose	Go Ichinose
46	えんとつやま	Mt. Chimney	Go Ichinose	Go Ichinose
47	視線！やまおとこ	Glance! Hiker	Go Ichinose	Go Ichinose
48	111番道路	Route 111	Go Ichinose	Go Ichinose
49	ジム	Gym	Junichi Masuda	Morikazu Aoki
50	戦闘！ジムリーダー	Battle! Gym Leader	Junichi Masuda	Junichi Masuda
51	ジムリーダーに勝利！	Gym Leader Defeated!	Junichi Masuda	Morikazu Aoki
52	バッジゲット	Get Badge	Junichi Masuda	Morikazu Aoki
53	わざマシンゲット	Get Technical Machine	Junichi Masuda	Morikazu Aoki
54	なみのり	Surf	Morikazu Aoki	Morikazu Aoki

DISC 2

Disc 2
No.	Track title (Japanese)	Track title (English Translation)	Composer	Arranger
1	119番道路	Route 119	Go Ichinose	Go Ichinose
2	ヒワマキシティ	Fortree City	Morikazu Aoki	Morikazu Aoki
3	120番道路	Route 120	Morikazu Aoki	Morikazu Aoki
4	インタビュアー	Interviewers	Go Ichinose	Go Ichinose
5	サファリゾーン	Safari Zone	Go Ichinose	Go Ichinose
6	視線！ジェントルマン	Glance! Gentleman	Go Ichinose	Go Ichinose
7	ミナモシティ	Lilycove City	Go Ichinose	Go Ichinose
8	美術館	Art Museum	Morikazu Aoki	Morikazu Aoki
9	わざ忘れ	Forget Move	Morikazu Aoki	Morikazu Aoki
10	ユウキ	Brendan	Go Ichinose	Go Ichinose
11	戦闘！ユウキ・ハルカ	Battle! Brendan/May	Junichi Masuda	Junichi Masuda
12	進化	Evolution	Junichi Masuda	Morikazu Aoki
13	進化おめでとう	Congratulatory Evolution	Junichi Masuda	Morikazu Aoki
14	フレンドリィショップ	Poké Mart	Go Ichinose	Go Ichinose
15	おくりびやま	Mt. Pyre	Junichi Masuda	Go Ichinose
16	視線！サイキッカー	Glance! Psychic	Go Ichinose	Go Ichinose
17	視線！オカルトマニア	Glance! Hex Maniac	Go Ichinose	Go Ichinose
18	おくりびやま外壁	Mt. Pyre's Outer Wall	Go Ichinose	Go Ichinose
19	アジト	Hideout	Go Ichinose	Go Ichinose
20	どうぐゲット	Get Item	Junichi Masuda	Morikazu Aoki
21	アクア団登場！	Team Aqua Appears!	Go Ichinose	Go Ichinose
22	戦闘！アクア・マグマ団のリーダー	Battle! Team Aqua/Magma's Leader	Junichi Masuda	Junichi Masuda
23	目覚める超古代ポケモン	Awakening the Super-Ancient Pokémon	Morikazu Aoki	Morikazu Aoki
24	日照り	Drought	Go Ichinose	Go Ichinose
25	大雨	Heavy Rain	Go Ichinose	Go Ichinose
26	ダイビング	Diving	Go Ichinose	Go Ichinose
27	ルネシティ	Sootopolis City	Go Ichinose	Go Ichinose
28	めざめのほこら	Cave of Origin	Morikazu Aoki	Morikazu Aoki
29	戦闘！超古代ポケモン	Battle! Super-Ancient Pokémon	Junichi Masuda	Junichi Masuda
30	視線！ビキニのおねえさん	Glance! Swimmer♀	Morikazu Aoki	Morikazu Aoki
31	サイユウシティ	Ever Grande City	Go Ichinose	Go Ichinose
32	きのみゲット	Get Berry	Morikazu Aoki	Morikazu Aoki
33	コンテストロビー	Contest Lobby	Go Ichinose	Go Ichinose
34	コンテスト！	Contest!	Go Ichinose	Go Ichinose
35	結果発表	Result Announcement	Go Ichinose	Go Ichinose
36	コンテスト優勝	Contest Championship	Go Ichinose	Go Ichinose
37	おふれのせきしつ	Sealed Chamber	Go Ichinose	Go Ichinose
38	戦闘！レジロック・レジアイス・レジスチル	Battle! Regirock/Regice/Registeel	Junichi Masuda	Junichi Masuda
39	カラクリ屋敷	Trick House	Go Ichinose	Go Ichinose
40	すてらねぶね	Abandoned Ship	Morikazu Aoki	Morikazu Aoki
41	バトルタワー	Battle Tower	Morikazu Aoki	Morikazu Aoki
42	チャンピオンロード	Victory Road	Go Ichinose	Go Ichinose
43	視線！エリートトレーナー	Glance! Cooltrainer	Go Ichinose	Go Ichinose
44	四天王登場！	Elite Four Appears!	Go Ichinose	Go Ichinose
45	戦闘！四天王	Battle! Elite Four	Junichi Masuda	Junichi Masuda
46	チャンピオンダイゴ	Champion Steven	Go Ichinose	Go Ichinose
47	決戦！ダイゴ	Decisive Battle! Steven	Junichi Masuda	Junichi Masuda
48	ダイゴに勝利！	Steven Defeated!	Morikazu Aoki	Morikazu Aoki
49	栄光の部屋	Room of Glory	Go Ichinose	Go Ichinose
50	殿堂入り	Induction to the Hall of Fame	Junichi Masuda	Go Ichinose
51	エンディング	Ending	Go Ichinose	Go Ichinose
52	The END	The END	Go Ichinose	Go Ichinose

BONUS TRACKS

Bonus Tracks
No.	Track title (Japanese)	Track title (English Translation)	Composer	Arranger
53	TRICK MASTER	TRICK MASTER	Go Ichinose	Go Ichinose
54	SLATEPORT CITY	SLATEPORT CITY	Go Ichinose	Go Ichinose
55	STEVEN STONE	STEVEN STONE	Junichi Masuda	Junichi Masuda

== Release ==
Pokémon Ruby and Sapphire were released in Japan on November 21, 2002, in North America on March 19, 2003, in Australia on April 3, 2003, and in Europe on July 25, 2003. Nintendo did not promote Ruby and Sapphire at E3 2002; however, it launched a US$ $7 million promotional campaign that lasted from March to May 2003. In July and August 2002 they were promoted through a tour across Japan at Pokémon Festa 2002. In addition to rewarding pre-orders of the games with merchandise, Nintendo held a contest in which participants submitted videos of themselves singing the Pokémon theme song with their own re-written lyrics; the grand prize for that event was a Lugia PT Cruiser. Later that year, Nintendo launched the EON Ticket Summer Tour, in which 125 Toys "R" Us stores across the United States offered the Eon Ticket e-Card in stores from July 19 to September 1. Nintendo aired two television advertisements, "Faces" and "Names", on prime-time network, cable, and syndication. "Faces" featured Pokémon juxtaposed with human look-alikes; "Names" featured people shouting out the names of Pokémon and emphasized the fact that the games introduced 100 new Pokémon. Additionally, Nintendo collaborated with United Kingdom beverage brand Vimto to promote the games.

=== Pokémon Emerald ===
Pokémon Emerald Version (Note: Japanese: ポケットモンスター エメラルド, Hepburn: Poketto Monsutā Emerarudo; lit. "Pocket Monsters: Emerald") is a third version after Pokémon Ruby and Sapphire, developed by Game Freak, published by The Pokémon Company and Nintendo for the Game Boy Advance. It was first released in Japan in 2004, and was later released internationally in 2005. Emerald received generally positive reception and by fiscal year 2007 sales had reached 6.32 million units.

== Reception ==
=== Critical response ===
Reception

Aggregate scores
Aggregator	Score
GameRankings	84% (55 reviews)
Metacritic	82% (33 reviews)

Review scores
Publication	Score
1Up.com	B−
Computer and Video Games	9/10
Eurogamer	7/10
Famitsu	9/10, 8/10, 8/10, 9/10
GameSpot	8.1/10 (Ruby)
GameZone	9.5/10 (Ruby)
IGN	9.5/10 (Ruby)

The games were met with mostly positive reviews. IGN gave them an "Amazing" 9.5 out of 10 rating and awarded them the Editor's Choice Award; in 2007, the games were collectively named the tenth best Game Boy Advance game of all time in an IGN article. GameZone also gave the games a 9.5 out of 10 rating and awarded them an Outstanding Award. GamePro gave the games 5 out of 5 stars and named them Editor's Choices. ComputerAndVideoGames.com gave the games a 9 out of 10, and GameSpot gave the games 8.1 out of 10, naming it the best Game Boy Advance game of March 2003. Eurogamer and 1UP.com were less enthusiastic about the games, however; Eurogamer gave the games 7 out of 10, and 1UP.com gave them a B−.

Reviewers were divided in their critiques of the games, especially concerning the gameplay and graphics. IGN praised the "deep design" and noted that the addition of features such as double battles greatly increased the strategic aspect of the games. GamePro also thought that the addition of double battles "add[ed] challenge" and "made the harder battles far more strategic than before—the way the game should be". Likewise, ComputerAndVideoGames.com called the gameplay "incredibly compelling and addictive". GameZone noted that the gameplay was more refined and challenging than that of previous titles. However, GameSpot called the games "a cakewalk from start to finish" and claimed that Ruby and Sapphire "don't offer much of a challenge". Eurogamer also felt that the mechanics "[get] very tired, very fast". 1UP.com also felt that the games were formulaic and that double battles were underused.

ComputerAndVideoGames.com was enthusiastic over the graphics, calling them "gorgeous". Other reviewers were less enthusiastic, however. GamePro felt that the graphics were only "a fair bit prettier" than those of the Game Boy Color games; GameZone said that the games "still [use] the simple animations and basic character designs that were created for the original, color-less Game Boy". IGN and 1UP.com noted that the graphics had received only a minor upgrade, and Eurogamer felt that the graphics had been upgraded to a "functional level at best". The audio was generally well-received: GameZone and GameSpot both felt the audio was catchy; GameZone gave the audio an 8 out of 10 score, saying that while the music "was annoying at times, [...] it's also very good. [...] I found myself humming the music when I wasn't playing". Other complaints included the removal of the time system of Gold and Silver and the inability to import Pokémon from the games of previous generations.

=== Sales ===
Pokémon Ruby and Sapphire were highly anticipated. In Japan, they sold 1.25 million units within the first four days of release and were the best-selling games of the 2002 holiday season; sales totaled around 4.4 million within six weeks of release. They also became the first games to sell 2 million copies in Japan since 2001's Final Fantasy X and the first games for a handheld console to do so since 2000's Yu-Gi-Oh! Duel Monsters 4. (Note: If the two games are counted as one)

In North America, Nintendo sold 2.2 million units by April 2003, less than one month after the games' release in that region. In the United States, Ruby and Sapphire were the second- and third-best-selling games of 2003, respectively. The games enjoyed success in Europe as well. Even before release, European retailers imported cartridges from the United States to meet the high demand. Upon release, 500,000 copies were sold in its first weekend and sold 1.5 million within eight weeks. They were the second-best-selling games of the holiday season in 2002. The games were brought up at E3 2003 by Satoru Iwata as a symbol of how successful the Game Boy Advance was at the time.

With 16.22 million units sold worldwide as of 2023, they are the best-selling games for the Game Boy Advance. However, analysts noted that with "young kids...gravitating toward Yu-Gi-Oh!" at the time, Pokémon's popularity was waning even before the American release of Ruby and Sapphire. This was reflected in the games' sales compared to those of previous generations: Red and Blue sold nearly 31 million units worldwide, and Gold and Silver sold over 23 million units.

=== Awards ===
Year	Award	Category	Result
2003	Golden Joystick Awards	Handheld Game of the Year	Nominated
2004	Interactive Achievement Awards	Handheld Game of the Year	Nominated
2004	British Academy Game Awards	Children's Game	Nominated
2004	British Academy Game Awards	Game Boy Advance Game	Nominated

== Legacy ==
=== Remakes ===
Pokémon Omega Ruby (Note: Japanese: ポケットモンスター オメガルビー, Hepburn: Poketto Monsutā Omega Rubī; "Pocket Monsters: Omega Ruby") and Pokémon Alpha Sapphire (Note: Japanese: ポケットモンスター アルファサファイア, Hepburn: Poketto Monsutā Arufa Safaia; "Pocket Monsters: Alpha Sapphire") are enhanced remakes of Pokémon Ruby and Sapphire. The new titles were developed by Game Freak and published by Nintendo for the Nintendo 3DS. They were released worldwide for the Nintendo 3DS on November 21, 2014, exactly twelve years after the original release date of Ruby and Sapphire, while the European release was the following week.

=== Related games ===
==== Pokémon Box: Ruby and Sapphire ====
Pokémon Box: Ruby and Sapphire (Note: Japanese: ポケモンボックス ルビー＆サファイア, Hepburn: Pokemon Bokkusu Rubī & Safaia) or simply Pokémon Box (Note: Japanese: ポケモンボックス, Hepburn: Pokemon Bokkusu), is a spin-off Pokémon game for the GameCube, bundled with a GameCube – Game Boy Advance link cable and a Memory Card 59. It was released in Japan on May 30, 2003, and in North America on July 12, 2004, but only through the New York Pokémon Center and its online store, and it is no longer available in either location. The game was released in some parts of Europe as Pokémon Memory Magic due to translation problems and Europeans could only get the game by using points from Nintendo of Europe's loyalty program or by buying the Pokémon Colosseum Mega Pack.

The game is essentially a storage system for the Game Boy Advance Pokémon games that allow players to trade and store Pokémon that they have caught in Ruby, Sapphire, Emerald, FireRed and LeafGreen onto a GameCube memory card. Players can then organize and interact with their Pokémon on the GameCube, such as allowing them to breed. Unique Pokémon can also be acquired. Another feature allows Ruby and Sapphire to be played on the television via the GameCube – Game Boy Advance link cable. Options such as taking screenshots of the game are available in this mode. Another addition is the "Showcase", where players can create and display game pieces of Pokémon.

Nintendo referred to the game as "the most exclusive Pokémon software ever offered to North American Pokémon fans," but it was generally considered to be unnecessary, receiving a score of 50% on GameRankings from 1 review. Craig Harris of IGN gave the game a "Meh" rating of 5.0 out of 10, praising the interface, which makes the organization of Pokémon much easier as compared to the Game Boy Advance interface, as well as the emulator which allows Ruby and Sapphire to be played on the GameCube. He also stated that the game was a good deal due to the inclusion of a memory card and link cable. However, Harris cited the "Showcase" as "entirely unnecessary and completely out of place", and said that overall the game lacked much to do. He wrote, "It's targeted specifically for the truly die-hard Pokemon fan, but it requires so many specific elements to actually be useful to anyone." Allgame gave the game three and a half out of five stars.
