= Tembo the Badass Elephant =

2015 video game

- Developer: Game Freak
- Publisher: Sega
- Director: James Turner
- Producers: Tetsuya Watanabe; Kagasei Shimomura
- Designers: Shin Kimura; Masayuki Onoue; Kazuhiko Takata
- Programmers: Hiroto Ito; Kaori Hayashi; Yoshiharu Kuwabara
- Composer: Hideaki Kuroda
- Platforms: PlayStation 4 Windows; Xbox One
- Release: July 21, 2015
- Genre: Platform
- Mode: Single-player

Tembo the Badass Elephant (stylized in all caps) is a 2015 platform video game developed by Game Freak and published by Sega. It was released for PlayStation 4, Windows, and Xbox One on July 21, 2015. The game allows players to play as an elephant called Tembo, who has different abilities to smash through structures and objects, and is on a journey to rescue the metropolis known as the "Shell City" from an invading evil army known as "Phantom".

== Gameplay ==
A gameplay screenshot of the game showing Tembo, the playable character, smashing through objects

Tembo the Badass Elephant is a 2D platform side-scrolling game in which players take control of an elephant named Tembo, as he progresses through Shell City to stop the invasion of a military force called the Phantom. The title features visuals similar to that of cartoons and comic books, and divided into three different zones with three basic levels and an enemy base, followed by a boss stage each. Each enemy base can only be unlocked by killing a set quota of enemies on previous levels. Once all three zones are completed, a fourth, last zone consisting of two levels and the final boss stage is unlocked. The major goal of every level is to reach the end of the level while destroying as much of the enemy force as possible, while innocent citizens held prisoners are scattered around the stage, waiting to be rescued as well, and a medal is awarded for rescuing all hostages in a stage.

Tembo can perform different movements, like smashing objects with his tusks, jumping, dashing, punching and stomping with his body to destroy structures, enemies, and enemies' vehicles like tanks in order to progress. Tembo can also store water on his trunk to put out fires or shortcut electrical traps. Players are also tasked to solve puzzles throughout the game. Momentum and destruction are emphasized in the game. Tembo's health can be replenished by collecting special crates located throughout the stage, and, by collecting 300 peanuts, Tembo is awarded an extra life that comes in the form of a can of peanut butter. The game environments are interactive, allowing Tembo the chance to unleash more destruction. Additionally, Tembo is accompanied and assisted by a bird called Picolo throughout the game.

== Development and release ==
The title was officially announced on March 11, 2015, by Game Freak, which had previously developed the main series Pokémon-video games and Sega, a video game publisher. The collaboration between Game Freak and Sega was revealed one week prior to the game's announcement. According to director James Turner, Tembo was "Rambo in elephant form". Inspirations were also drawn from several action movies of the 1980s, Dumbo as well as other video game franchises like Metal Slug, Donkey Kong Country, and Yoshi's Island. Inspirations were also drawn from HarmoKnight, one of Game Freak's earlier games. Developers also once thought to turn the game into an endless runner but the idea was later scrapped. The title was released on July 21, 2015, for PlayStation 4, Windows, and Xbox One.

== Reception ==
Reception

Aggregate score
Aggregator	Score
Metacritic	(PC) 69/100 (PS4) 72/100 (XONE) 70/100

Review scores
Publication	Score
Destructoid	8/10
GameTrailers	8/10
IGN	7/10
VideoGamer.com	6/10

The initial reception of the game was positive, with critics surprised by the nature of the game and the game's protagonist Tembo. Comparisons were drawn between the game and the Sonic the Hedgehog series.

Tembo the Badass Elephant received mixed-positive reviews upon release. Aggregating review websites Metacritic gave the PlayStation 4 version 71/100 based on 20 reviews. Chris Carter from Destructoid gave the game an 8 out of 10, praising the game's open-ended level design for allowing players to use different approaches to complete their objectives. In addition, he praised the game's artstyle, which he compared to works from Cartoon Network. However, Tom Orry from VideoGamer.com was much more negative about the game, giving it a 6 out of 10. While applauding the game's gameplay, which he described as "a neat mix of Sonic the Hedgehog and the sidescrolling parts of Crash Bandicoot", he strongly criticized the point unlocking system, which tasks players to gain enough points before proceeding to the next level, as he considered such features "a forced grind". IGN awarded it a score of 7 out of 10, saying "Tembo stumbles at times, but its overall charm, and moments of rhythmic zen keep it fun throughout."
