= Game Freak =

Japanese video game developer

Game Freak Inc.

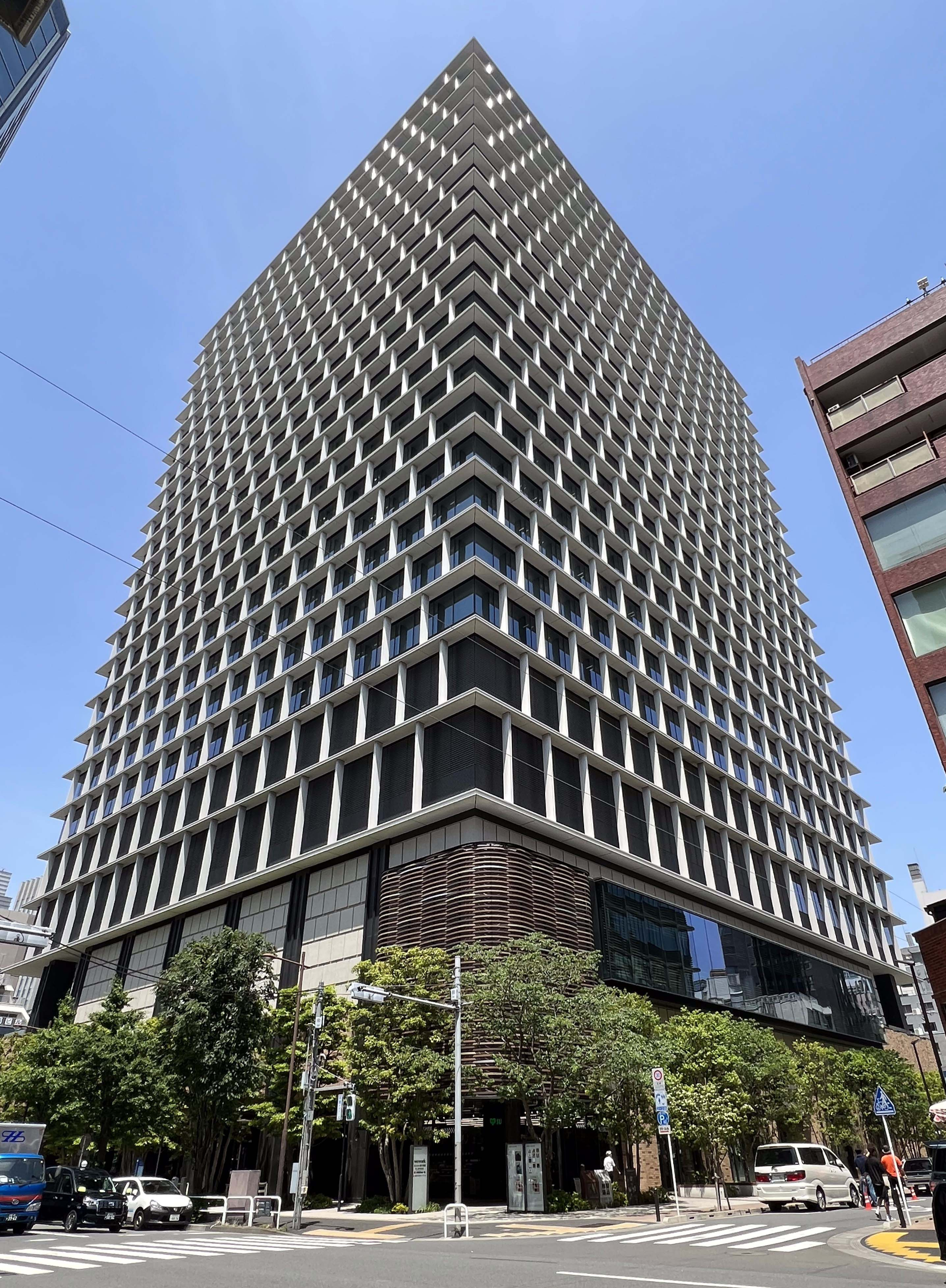
- Headquarters in Chiyoda, Tokyo
- Native name: 株式会社ゲームフリーク
- Romanized name: Gēmu Furīku
- Type: Private
- Industry: Video games
- Genre: Video game development
- Founded: April 26, 1989; 37 years ago in Tokyo, Japan
- Founders: Satoshi Tajiri; Ken Sugimori
- Headquarters: Kanda Square, 2-2-1 Kandanishiki-cho, Chiyoda, Tokyo, Japan
- Number of locations: 1 (2020)
- Key people: Satoshi Tajiri (president); Shigeru Ohmori (senior director and head of development); Ken Sugimori (art director)
- Products: Pokémon series
- Number of employees: 249 (2025)
- Website: www.gamefreak.co.jp

Game Freak Inc. (Note: Japanese: 株式会社ゲームフリーク, Hepburn: Kabushiki gaisha Gēmu Furīku) is a Japanese video game developer, best known as the primary developer and co-owners of the Pokémon series of role-playing video games alongside Nintendo and Creatures who also founded and co-own the joint venture The Pokémon Company.

== History ==
Predating the video game company, Game Freak was a doujin video game magazine created by Satoshi Tajiri in 1983. Ken Sugimori joined the circle at a later date as an illustrator after finding the magazine in a shop and liking it. Tajiri also used "Game Freak" as his pen name when he wrote as a freelance writer to publications such as Family Computer Magazine and Famicom Tsūshin.

On April 26, 1989, Tajiri and Sugimori started a video game development company with the same name. One of Game Freak's first games was the Nintendo Entertainment System action and puzzle game Quinty, which was released in North America as Mendel Palace. Its most popular series, Pokémon—the romanized portmanteau of the Japanese brand Pocket Monsters (ポケットモンスター, Poketto Monsutā)—is published and distributed respectively by The Pokémon Company and Nintendo worldwide.

Pokémon Center Co., Ltd. was founded in April 1998 through a joint investment by video game series developer Game Freak, original series publisher Nintendo, and Trading Card Game developer and original series producer Creatures to operate the Pokémon Center stores in Japan. In October 2000, it expanded its operations to cover the entire Pokémon franchise, and rebranded to its current name The Pokémon Company.

In October 2015, Game Freak acquired Koa Games, a mobile development company. The company was subsequently merged into Game Freak on December 1, 2015.

In May 2019, Game Freak director Masayuki Onoue revealed that Game Freak is increasingly prioritizing original game creation, in order to grow the experience of its staff. The company's Gear Project initiative, which encourages creators to pitch original game ideas during quiet periods, has so far resulted in original games HarmoKnight, Pocket Card Jockey, Tembo the Badass Elephant and Giga Wrecker.

In February 2020, Game Freak relocated its headquarters from Carrot Tower in Sangen-jaya to Kanda Square, an office building in Nishikichō shared with a number of Nintendo's Tokyo-based subsidiaries.

In October 2024, nearly a terabyte of data from Game Freak's servers was stolen. Development builds, source code, and test sprites either planned or released for past Pokémon games were found, as well as code names for upcoming Pokémon games, and prototypes of unreleased remakes of Quinty and Yoshi. Shortly afterwards, Game Freak addressed the incident, stating that the leak was due to "unauthorized access to our servers by a third party", which had taken place in August 2024. They also stated that many employees' personal information had been leaked.

== Games ==
List of video games developed by Game Freak
Year	Title	Publisher	Platform(s)	Ref.
1989	Mendel Palace	Namco^{JP}, Hudson Soft^{NA}	Nintendo Entertainment System	
1991	Smart Ball	Epic/Sony Records^{JP}, Sony Imagesoft^{NA}	Super Nintendo Entertainment System	
1991	Yoshi	Nintendo	NES, Game Boy	
1992	Magical★Tarurūto-kun	Sega	Mega Drive	
1993	Mario & Wario	Nintendo	Super Famicom	
1994	Nontan to Issho: KuruKuru Puzzle	Victor Entertainment	Game Boy, Super Famicom	
1994	Pulseman	Sega	Mega Drive	
1996	Pokémon Red and Green	Nintendo	Game Boy	
1996	Bazaar de Gosāru no Game de Gosāru	NEC Home Electronics	PC Engine CD-ROM²	
1996	Pokémon Blue	Nintendo	Game Boy	
1997	Bushi Seiryūden: Futari no Yūsha	T&E Soft	Super Famicom	
1998	Pokémon Yellow	Nintendo	Game Boy	
1999	Click Medic	Sony Music Entertainment Japan	PlayStation	
1999	Pokémon Gold and Silver	Nintendo	Game Boy Color	
2000	Pokémon Crystal	Nintendo	Game Boy Color	
2002	Pokémon Ruby and Sapphire	Nintendo; The Pokémon Company	Game Boy Advance	
2003	Pokémon Box: Ruby and Sapphire	Nintendo; The Pokémon Company	GameCube	
2004	Pokémon FireRed and LeafGreen	Nintendo; The Pokémon Company	Game Boy Advance	
2004	Pokémon Emerald	Nintendo; The Pokémon Company	Game Boy Advance	
2005	Drill Dozer	Nintendo	Game Boy Advance	
2006	Pokémon Diamond and Pearl	Nintendo; The Pokémon Company	Nintendo DS	
2008	Pokémon Platinum	Nintendo; The Pokémon Company	Nintendo DS	
2009	Pokémon HeartGold and SoulSilver	Nintendo; The Pokémon Company	Nintendo DS	
2010	Pokémon Black and White	Nintendo; The Pokémon Company	Nintendo DS	
2012	Pokémon Black 2 and White 2	Nintendo; The Pokémon Company	Nintendo DS	
2012	HarmoKnight	Nintendo	Nintendo 3DS	
2013	Pocket Card Jockey	Game Freak^{JP}, Nintendo^{WW}	Nintendo 3DS, iOS, Android	
2013	Pokémon X and Y	Nintendo; The Pokémon Company	Nintendo 3DS	
2014	Pokémon Omega Ruby and Alpha Sapphire	Nintendo; The Pokémon Company	Nintendo 3DS	
2015	Tembo the Badass Elephant	Sega	Xbox One, PlayStation 4, Windows	
2016	Pokémon Sun and Moon	Nintendo; The Pokémon Company	Nintendo 3DS	
2017	Giga Wrecker	Rising Star Games	Windows	
2017	Pokémon Ultra Sun and Ultra Moon	Nintendo; The Pokémon Company	Nintendo 3DS	
2018	Pokémon Quest	Nintendo; The Pokémon Company	Nintendo Switch, iOS, Android	
2018	Pokémon Let's Go, Pikachu! and Let's Go, Eevee!	Nintendo; The Pokémon Company	Nintendo Switch	
2019	Giga Wrecker Alt.	Rising Star Games	PlayStation 4, Xbox One, Nintendo Switch	
2019	Little Town Hero	Game Freak	Nintendo Switch, PlayStation 4, Windows, Xbox One	
2019	Pokémon Sword and Shield	Nintendo; The Pokémon Company	Nintendo Switch	
2020	Pokémon Sword and Shield Expansion Pass	Nintendo; The Pokémon Company	Nintendo Switch	
2022	Pokémon Legends: Arceus	Nintendo; The Pokémon Company	Nintendo Switch	
2022	Pokémon Scarlet and Violet	Nintendo; The Pokémon Company	Nintendo Switch	
2023	Pocket Card Jockey: Ride On!	Game Freak	iOS, macOS, Nintendo Switch	
2023	The Hidden Treasure of Area Zero	Nintendo; The Pokémon Company	Nintendo Switch	
2024	Pandoland	WonderPlanet	iOS, Android	
2025	Pokémon Legends: Z-A	Nintendo; The Pokémon Company	Nintendo Switch, Nintendo Switch 2	
2025	Mega Dimension	Nintendo; The Pokémon Company	Nintendo Switch, Nintendo Switch 2	
2026	Pokémon Pokopia (Note: Co-developed with Omega Force)	Nintendo; The Pokémon Company	Nintendo Switch 2	
2026	Beast of Reincarnation	Fictions	PlayStation 5, Windows, Xbox Series X/S	
2026	Ame no Chi Hare Onna	Game Freak	iOS, Android	
2027	Pokémon Winds and Waves	Nintendo; The Pokémon Company	Nintendo Switch 2	
