= Pokémon Gold and Silver =

1999 video games

Pokémon Gold; Pokémon Silver
- North American box art for Gold and Silver depicting the legendary Pokémon Ho-Oh and Lugia respectively
- Developer: Game Freak
- Publisher: Nintendo
- Director: Satoshi Tajiri
- Producers: Takehiro Izushi; Takashi Kawaguchi; Tsunekazu Ishihara
- Designers: Satoshi Tajiri; Junichi Masuda
- Programmer: Shigeki Morimoto
- Artist: Ken Sugimori
- Writers: Toshinobu Matsumiya; Kenji Matsushima
- Composers: Go Ichinose; Junichi Masuda; Morikazu Aoki
- Series: Pokémon
- Platform: Game Boy Color
- Release: JP: November 21, 1999; AU: October 13, 2000; NA: October 15, 2000; EU: April 6, 2001; KR: April 24, 2002
- Genre: Role-playing
- Modes: Single-player, multiplayer

Pokémon Gold Version (Note: Japanese: ポケットモンスター 金, Hepburn: Poketto Monsutā Kin; "Pocket Monsters: Gold") and Pokémon Silver Version (Note: Japanese: ポケットモンスター 銀, Hepburn: Poketto Monsutā Gin; "Pocket Monsters: Silver") are 1999 role-playing video games developed by Game Freak and published by Nintendo for the Game Boy Color. They are the first installments in the second generation of the Pokémon video game series. They were released in Japan on November 21st, 1999, Australia and North America on October 15th, 2000, and Europe on April 6th, 2001.

The games introduce 100 new species of Pokémon and follow the progress of the player character in their quest to master Pokémon battling. Both games are independent of each other but feature largely the same plot and, while both can be played separately, it is necessary to trade between these games and their predecessors in order to fully complete each game's Pokédex. The Johto Saga of the Pokémon anime is based on the new region introduced in the games.

Pokémon Gold and Silver were both critical and commercial successes; the games sold over 23 million units, making them the best-selling games for the Game Boy Color and the third-best-selling for the Game Boy family of systems. In retrospect, they are both cited as some of the most significant titles of the fifth generation of video games, two of the best entries in the series, if not the best, and both are touted as being amongst the greatest video games of all time. The two releases are also noted to have continued the success of the Pokémon series as it began to form into a billion-dollar franchise.

A third game in the generation, Pokémon Crystal, was released in 2000. In 2009, on the 10th anniversary of Gold and Silver, remakes titled Pokémon HeartGold and SoulSilver were released for the Nintendo DS.

== Gameplay ==
Like previous installments, Pokémon Gold and Silver are played from a third-person, top-down perspective, with players directly navigating the protagonist around the fictional universe, interacting with objects and people. As the player explores this world, they will encounter different terrains, such as grassy fields, forests, caves, and seas in which different Pokémon species reside. As the player randomly encounters one of these creatures, the field switches to a turn-based "battle scene", where the Pokémon will fight.

There are two main goals within the games: following through the main storyline and defeating the Elite Four and Pokémon Master Lance to become the new Champion, and completing the Pokédex by capturing, evolving, and trading to obtain all 251 creatures. A major aspect of this is developing and raising the player's Pokémon by battling other Pokémon, which can be found in the wild or owned by other Trainers. This system of accumulating experience points (EXP) and leveling up, characteristic and integral to all Pokémon video games, controls the physical properties of the Pokémon, such as the battle statistics acquired, and the moves learned.

=== New features ===
While Pokémon Gold and Silver retain the basic mechanics of capturing, battling, and evolving introduced in Pokémon Red and Blue, new features were added. A time system was introduced using a real-time internal clock that keeps track of the current time and day of the week. Certain events, including Pokémon appearances, are influenced by this feature. New items were added, with some designed to exploit a new mechanic: Pokémon being able to hold items. A new type of item able to be held was the berry, which comes in varieties and can restore health or cure status effects. Other held items can give boosts to the Pokémon during battle. More specialized Poké Balls were introduced, which make Pokémon catching easier in certain situations. A new item called the Pokégear (Note: Pokégear (ポケギア, Pokegia)) was introduced, functioning as a watch, map, radio, and phone, allowing the player to call other characters who offer their phone number. Trainers will call for a rematch and others will call about rare Pokémon that can be caught in a certain area.

The games introduce Raikou, Entei, and Suicune, some new types of legendary Pokémon that wander around Johto, changing locations frequently in a process known as Roaming Pokémon. They can be tracked by the Pokédex's habitat feature once encountered, and will always attempt to flee, but will retain HP loss. In addition, there is the possibility of encountering a shiny Pokémon, which have a different coloration than normal Pokémon of their species, and appear very rarely, around 1 in 8192 for games until Pokémon X and Y. Two new Pokémon types were added, the Steel-type and the Dark-type. Steel-type Pokémon are immune to Poison-type moves, and they have very high defense and resistance to other types, while Dark-type Pokémon are immune to Psychic-type moves and are strong against Psychic-type Pokémon (which provides an offensive strategy, formerly absent against Psychic-types), as well as having few weaknesses. In Gold and Silver, new moves were added, but Pokémon knowing these moves are not allowed to be traded to the first generation games. To solve this, a move deleter was introduced, capable of erasing moves known by the Pokémon. Another major change was the splitting of the "Special" stat into "Special Attack" and "Special Defense", which increased aspects of strategy.

With the introduction of Pokémon breeding, Pokémon are assigned to one or two breeding groups. When a male and female Pokémon that share at least one breeding group are left at a Pokémon Daycare, they may produce an egg, which will hatch into a young Pokémon. Do note that Ditto can breed with all but the Pokémon in No Eggs Discovered Group, even if the Pokémon other than Ditto is male. The young Pokémon will inherit the species of its mother, and moves from its father. However, legendary and mythical Pokémon, among certain other species, cannot breed.

== Plot ==
=== Setting ===
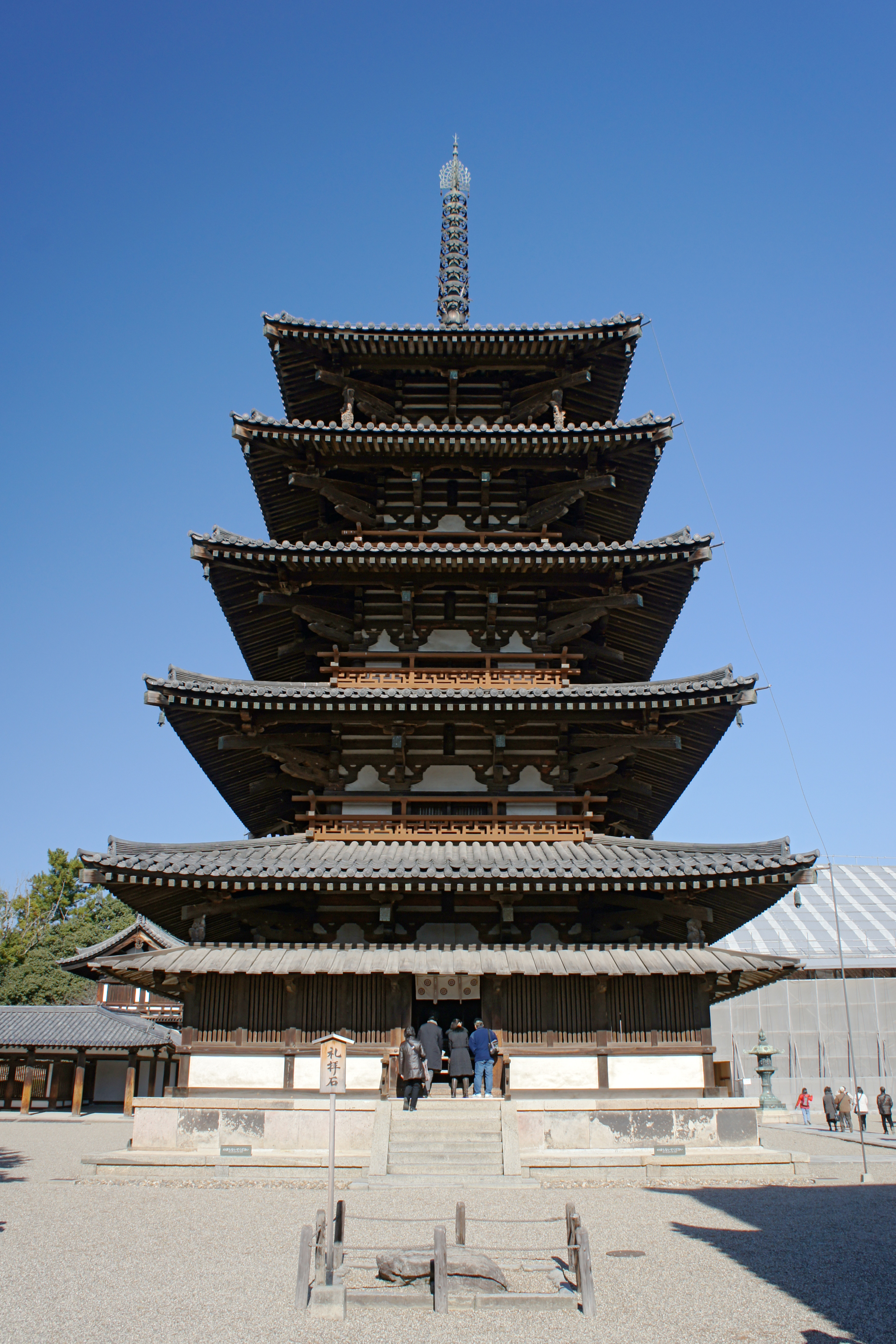
The older architectures of Japan's Kansai and Tōkai regions inspired the setting of the Johto Region. Pictured is Hōryū-ji in Nara Prefecture.

Pokémon Gold and Silver are set in the region of Johto, situated to the west of the Kanto Region from the previous Red and Blue games, and three years after the conclusion of the previous games. The design of Johto was inspired by Japan's Kansai and Tōkai regions, with many of the region's temples and more traditional Japanese aesthetics finding their way into Johto.

=== Story ===
As with the previous games, the player character receives his first Pokémon, a choice between Chikorita, Cyndaquil, and Totodile, from the region's local Pokémon scientist, Professor Elm, and then begins his journey to win the eight Gym Badges of the Johto Region and then challenge the Elite Four and the Johto League Champion to become a Pokémon Master. Opposing him is his mysterious rival, a boy who stole one of the other Pokémon from Professor Elm and regularly challenges the player to test his strengths. The player also encounters the villainous Team Rocket, having reunited to seek out their previous leader Giovanni to return the group to their former glory. Eventually, the player thwarts Team Rocket once and for all and defeats the Elite Four and the Johto League Champion on Indigo Plateau. The player can then travel to the Kanto Region from the previous games and challenge the Kanto Gym Leaders there, discovering how much has changed in the three years following the events of Red and Blue. For example, Cinnabar Island has been almost completely taken over by a volcano eruption; only a Pokémon Center remains. After defeating the Kanto Gym Leaders, the player is allowed to enter the treacherous Mt. Silver area, home to very powerful Pokémon. Deep within Mt. Silver's caves is Red, the main protagonist of Red, Green, Blue and Yellow and Indigo League Champion, whom the player can challenge for the most difficult final battle in the game.

== Development ==
Gold and Silver were first publicly showcased at November 1997, Nintendo Space World Expo in Japan, becoming the most popular exhibit at the program. Unlike the previous game in the series, Pokémon Yellow, the new titles were announced to be more than a small upgrade to Pokémon Red and Blue. Instead, they would feature a new storyline, a new world, and new species of Pokémon. Gold and Silver were designed for the Game Boy Color, allowing them full color support and more detailed sprites. Other additions that were shown included Pokémon breeding, held items, an in-game gadget known as the PokéGear, a real-time internal clock, and backward compatibility with the previous games in the series.

During an ABC News interview, president of Creatures Inc. Tsunekazu Ishihara gave insight into the brainstorming process for developing new Pokémon species. He explained, "The ideas for each of these monsters came from the imagination of the software developers at Game Freak who get these ideas from their childhood experiences, including from reading manga, a style of Japanese comic books. Ideas come from scary experiences they had as kids, catching insects, and so forth. So from these experiences in childhood, these ideas for Pokémon came out". In the same vein as the Pokémon Mew of Red and Blue, the exclusive Pokémon Celebi was included in the Gold and Silver games but is only accessible after attending a Nintendo promotional event. The first official event offering Celebi was Nintendo Space World 2000 in Japan, in which 100,000 attendees would be awarded the rare Pokémon. In order to be selected, players had to send in a postcard to enter a lottery for one of 100,000 certificates of Celebi, allowing them to enter the event and obtain it.

Ishihara stated that Gold and Silver started development right after Pokémon Red and Green were released in Japan. The original intention was to release the game in 1998, even synchronizing with the supposed end of the anime's first season. Development issues, worsened by Game Freak being sidetracked with Pokémon Stadium and the localization of the first generation, led the game to be postponed, and the original release slate was taken over by Pokémon Yellow. Programmer Shigeki Morimoto stated that part of why development took three and a half years was due to being a small team of only four programmers. Satoru Iwata, then the president of HAL Laboratory who would later become Nintendo's CEO, helped the team by developing new tools for compressing the Pokémon graphic code.

Junichi Masuda composed the game's music on an Amiga computer, converted it to MIDI data and reconverted again for Game Boy Color.

=== Unused and cut content ===
In 2018, ROM images of the early-in-development Japanese-language demo shown during the 1997 Nintendo Space World presentation resurfaced: two debug versions of the games, and two versions that were modified to work on normal Game Boy hardware and most emulators. These ROM images were only rumored to exist until they were anonymously posted on the "Pokémon Reverse Engineering Tools" (PRET) Discord server in May 2018. The demo was quickly shared with members of the website The Cutting Room Floor. The ROMs were analyzed and translated, and The Cutting Room Floor went on to release a spreadsheet containing all the information they had discovered, which includes a list of Pokémon species, Pokémon "moves", items, non-playable characters, maps, and music. The ROMs were first released anonymously onto 4chan's /vp/ board in May, with a formal The Cutting Room Floor release coming later that day. The demo has a larger world map than the final game (which itself is based on the entire Japanese archipelago, unlike the final region, which is based on the Kansai region of Japan), and includes around 100 unused and changed Pokémon designs.

Earlier in May 2018, Pokémon artist Atsuko Nishida revealed that the popular creature Pikachu was originally supposed to have a third evolution, named "Gorochu". Additionally, Pokémon creator Satoshi Tajiri has revealed four unused designs that would have been included in the original Pokémon games.

While cut content is not uncommon in video games, the volume of cut content in the Gold and Silver demo has been described as "overwhelming". Matthew Byrd, writing for Den of Geek, stated that a lot of design work had gone into the Pokémon that were eventually cut, suggesting that Game Freak might have taken them out during the testing phase due to balance issues.

== Release ==
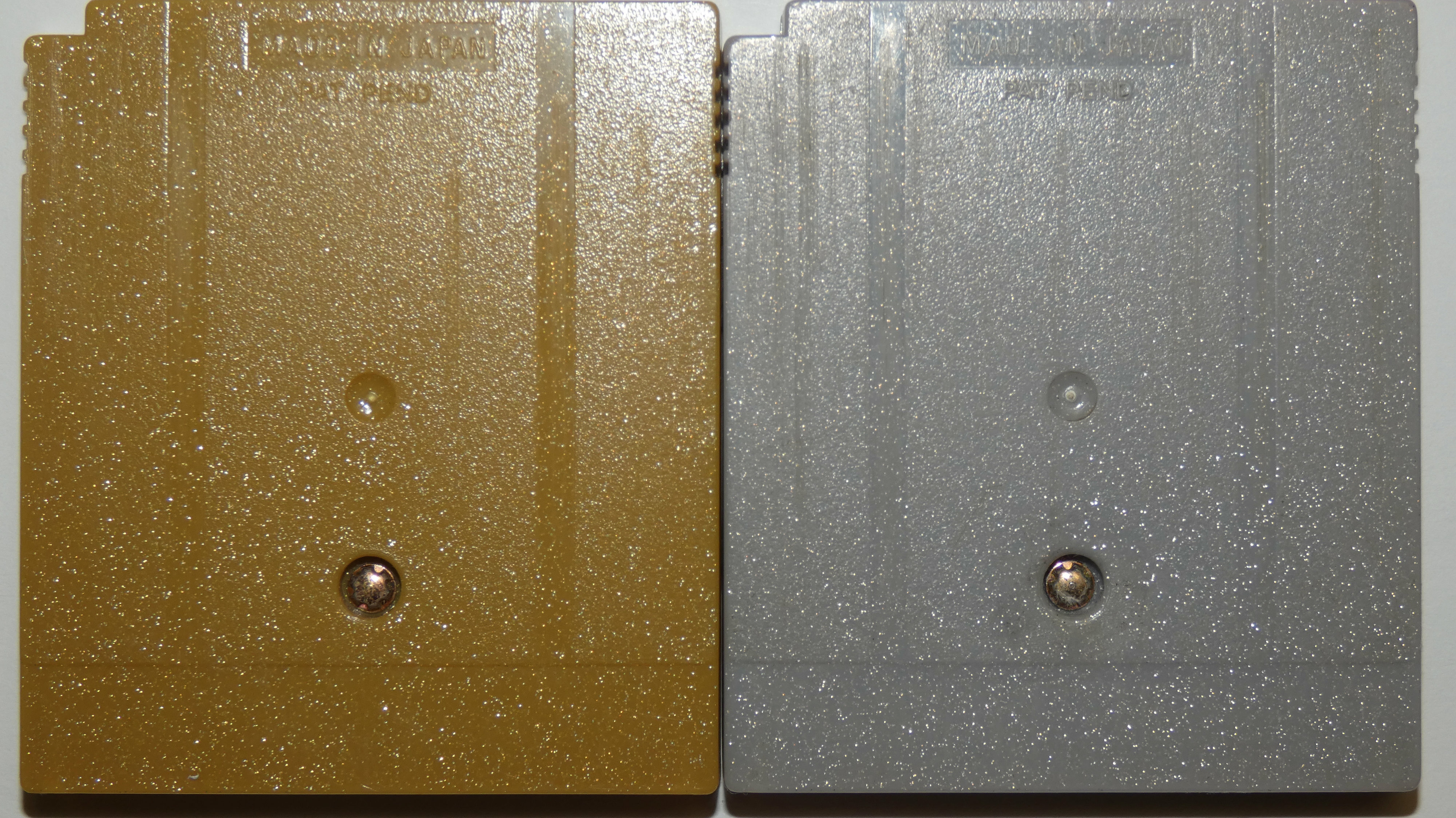
Official Gold and Silver cartridges

In September 1999, the games were announced for release in Japan on November 21, 1999, and a North American release date was estimated for September 2000. Nintendo announced the release of the Pocket Pikachu Color, a full-color portable digital pet similar to the one released the year before. The unit is compatible with Gold and Silver, allowing the transfer of in-game currency known as "watt points". Pocket Pikachu Color was slated for release in Japan on November 21, 1999, the same day as the release of Gold and Silver. In addition, an officially licensed Pikachu-themed Game Link Cable developed by Kemco was set for release in Japan on November 18, 1999. The product functions like a normal Game Link Cable and consists of a yellow cable with a figure of Pikachu on one end, and a Poké Ball on the other.

Anticipating high sales, Nintendo set its first production shipment for the games in Japan at three million, predicting that eventually more than eight million copies would be sold in the country alone. However, they were soon forced to cut the first shipment number in half following an earthquake in Taiwan, which Nintendo claimed had damaged their cartridge manufacturing facilities. Regardless, speculation arose that Nintendo was instead using the event as an excuse to limit shipment and keep the demand high.

As a precursor to the North American release, Gold and Silver were displayed for audiences to interact with at the 2000 American International Toy Fair in New York City. To further promote the games, Nintendo modified five Chrysler PT Cruisers to resemble the new Pokémon Lugia and had them driven around the United States. The vehicles had fins and tails attached to them and were painted with logos and images of the Pokémon franchise. In addition, they were equipped with a television set hooked up to game consoles which allowed spectators to play Pokémon Puzzle League, Hey You, Pikachu!, and Pokémon Gold and Silver. The television series Pokémon GS, based on the games, was announced to be a part of the fall lineup on Kids' WB. The show features the same protagonist Ash Ketchum in a new region with different Pokémon species from the games. The localized English names of the 100 new Pokémon were kept confidential by Nintendo, with the company releasing names periodically. The domain names 'pokemongold.com' and 'pokemonsilver.com' were registered for this very purpose, and such names released included Chikorita, Lugia, Ho-Oh, Togepi, Hoothoot, and Marill.

In September 1999, Nintendo announced that Gold and Silver would be released in North America in September 2000. In May 2000, Nintendo announced the official North American release date of Gold and Silver would instead be October 16 of that year. The release date was later changed to October 15. In North America, Nintendo started accepting pre-orders for the games in August; a CD-ROM was available as a pre-order bonus that included clips and music from Pokémon the Movie 2000, screenshots from Pokémon Gold and Silver, a Pokémon-themed desktop wallpaper, an offer for a Nintendo Power Player's Guide, and Pokémon-related trivia. The games had record pre-order sales — approximately 600,000 copies of the games were pre-ordered in just two months, compared to 150,000 copies for Pokémon Yellow. As the release date neared and retailers began to receive shipments of the games, some retailers—such as Electronics Boutique—opted to sell them immediately upon receiving the games; first using them to fulfill pre-orders, and then selling the remaining copies to walk-in customers. The games were reportedly obtainable as early as October 11.

The games were released in Australia on October 13, 2000 and in Europe on April 6, 2001.

Nintendo spent between $12 million and $14 million to market the game in the United States.

=== Pokémon Crystal ===
Pokémon Crystal Version (Note: Japanese: ポケットモンスター クリスタルバージョン, Hepburn: Poketto Monsutā Kurisutaru Bājon; "Pocket Monsters: Crystal Version") is a third version after Pokémon Gold and Silver, developed by Game Freak and published by Nintendo for the Game Boy Color. It was released in Japan on December 14, 2000, North America on July 30, 2001, and in Europe on November 2, 2001. The plot and gameplay of Crystal is largely the same as in Gold and Silver, although it includes several new features.

Pokémon Crystal was received well by critics, although many commented that there were just not enough new additions and features to significantly set it apart from Pokémon Gold and Silver. Pokémon Crystal has sold nearly 6.4 million units worldwide.

=== Nintendo 3DS re-release ===
In June 2017, The Pokémon Company announced via a Pokémon Direct broadcast that the games would be re-released worldwide via the Nintendo 3DS Virtual Console on September 22, 2017.

== Reception ==
Reception

Aggregate score
Aggregator	Score
GameRankings	89% (Gold); 91% (Silver)

Review scores
Publication	Score
EP Daily	9.5/10 (Silver)
Famitsu	8/10, 9/10, 8/10, 8/10
GameSpot	8.8/10 (Gold)
IGN	10/10 (Gold)
Nintendo Life	9/10
Nintendo Power	8.7/10

Pokémon Gold and Silver were met with critical acclaim, with many saying that the extended length of gameplay and the new features were valued additions that kept the sequels as interesting as the original games. Craig Harris of IGN gave the games a "masterful" 10 out of 10 rating, stating that: "As awesome as the original Pokémon edition was, Pokémon Gold and Silver blow it away in gameplay elements, features, and goodies. There are so many little additions to the design it's impossible to list them all". There was particular praise given to the innovative internal clock feature, with Frank Povo of GameSpot, noting: "The first major addition to Pokémon GS is the presence of a time element... Although it may sound like a gimmick, the addition of a clock adds quite a bit of variety to the game". Povo went on to give the games an 8.8 rating of "great". Nintendo Power listed Gold and Silver combined as the sixth best Game Boy / Game Boy Color games, praising them for the new Pokémon, features, and full-color graphics.

Overall, Gold and Silver were stated to be solid gaming additions that would please a large audience. "After playing the game dozens of hours, I really can't think of a bad point to make about Pokémon Gold and Silver. Nintendo and Game Freak have tweaked the original and built a sequel that's long, challenging and tremendous fun to play. There's a reason why Pokémon is so popular, and Pokémon Gold and Silver is going to help the series move further into the 21st century", said Harris.

=== Sales ===
Pokémon Gold and Silver continued the enormous success of Pokémon Red and Blue, beginning the formation of Pokémon into a multi-billion dollar franchise. Upon its first day of release in Japan, the game sold 1,425,768 units. As of April 2000, roughly 6.5 million copies of the games had been sold in Japan. Silver proved to be the slightly more popular version, edging out Gold by approximately 100,000 copies.

In the U.S., the game generated 1 million pre-sales about three weeks before release. Upon the first week of release in the U.S., the games had eclipsed Pokémon Yellow's previous record sales of a little over 600,000 copies; selling a combined total of 1.4 million copies to become the fastest-selling games ever. The commercial success was expected, as Peter Main, the executive vice president of sales and marketing, stated "There's no question about it; kids love to play Pokémon. So far in 2000 the best-selling game in America for any home console is Pokémon Stadium for Nintendo 64, and the best-selling game for any handheld video game system is Pokémon Yellow for Game Boy Color, but Pokémon Gold and Silver will eclipse even those impressive sales totals. We project sales of 10 million units total of these two games in less than six months time". The game sold 2.9 million copies in the U.S. within a few weeks.

In Germany, Gold and Silver received two Double Platinum awards from the Verband der Unterhaltungssoftware Deutschland (VUD) for sales above 800,000 copies by 2002. In the United Kingdom, Gold and Silver received two Platinum awards for sales above 600,000 copies. By 2010, Gold and Silver had sold 23 million units worldwide.

== Legacy ==
=== Remakes ===
Pokémon HeartGold Version (Note: Japanese: ポケットモンスター ハートゴールド, Hepburn: Poketto Monsutā Hātogōrudo; "Pocket Monsters: HeartGold") and Pokémon SoulSilver Version (Note: Japanese: ポケットモンスター ソウルシルバー, Hepburn: Poketto Monsutā Sōrushirubā; "Pocket Monsters: SoulSilver") are enhanced remakes of Pokémon Gold and Silver, developed by Game Freak and published by The Pokémon Company and Nintendo for the Nintendo DS. First released in Japan on September 12, 2009, the games were later released in North America, Australia, and Europe during March 2010.

Game director Shigeki Morimoto aimed to respect the feelings of those who played the previous games, while also ensuring that it felt like a new game to those that were introduced to the series in more recent years. Reception to the games was positive, the two being amongst the highest-rated DS games of all time on Metacritic. Commercially, they are among the best-selling Nintendo DS games of all time, with combined sales of 10 million units as of July 2010.
