= Pulseman =

1994 video game

- Developer: Game Freak
- Publisher: Sega
- Directors: Ken Sugimori; Satoshi Tajiri
- Designers: Ken Sugimori; Satoshi Tajiri
- Programmers: Michiharu Nishihashi; Takenori Ohta; Junichi Masuda
- Artists: Atsuko Nishida; Motofumi Fujiwara
- Writer: Ryousuke Taniguchi
- Composer: Junichi Masuda
- Platform: Mega Drive/Genesis
- Release: JP: 22 July 1994; NA: 1995 (Sega Channel)
- Genre: Platform
- Mode: Single-player

Pulseman (Note: Pulseman (Japanese: パルスマン, Hepburn: Parusuman)) is a 1994 Japanese platform game developed by Game Freak and published by Sega for the Sega Mega Drive. It was released in North America for the Sega Channel in 1995. It was re-released on the Virtual Console for the Wii in 2007 and 2009, and the Nintendo Classics service in 2023.

== Plot ==
In the 21st century, noted scientist and computer engineer Doc Yoshiyama had succeeded in creating the world's most advanced Artificial Intelligence. He called his creation C-Life and managed to make her aware, thinking and feeling. However, he soon found himself in love with this C-Life girl and wanted to be closer to her, so he digitized and uploaded himself into his computer core, where the two "made love" by combining his DNA and her program core. The end result of their love was the birth of a half human, half C-Life boy named Pulseman. Pulseman was unique in that he did not need to remain inside a computer to survive and had the power to channel electricity through his body, using it both as a weapon and as a means of quick transport through the power of Volteccer.

Unfortunately, living in the computer world for so long twisted Doc Yoshiyama's mind, corrupting his brainwaves and his body. Doc Yoshiyama emerged back into the human world, but twisted and changed into the evil Doc Waruyama. Using a system known as EUREKA, which allows for C-Life beings to manifest in the human world, Doc Waruyama establishes the Galaxy Gang, spreading a new wave of cyber-terrorism across the world. Pulseman must fight his own father and put an end to his gang for the sake of the free world.

== Development ==
When first announced, the game was titled Spark. It was directed by Ken Sugimori. Much of the staff who worked on Pulseman would later work on the Pokémon series, including Sugimori, designer Satoshi Tajiri, artist Atsuko Nishida, and composer Junichi Masuda.

== Release ==
The game was released in Japan on July 22, 1994. The North American version was released in 1995 via the Sega Channel. Pulseman was re-released for the Wii on the Virtual Console in Japan in 2007 and in North America and Europe in 2009. The game was added to the library of Sega Genesis games as part of the Nintendo Classics service on April 18, 2023.

== Reception ==
Reception

Aggregate score
Aggregator	Score
GameRankings	80%

Review scores
Publication	Score
Beep! MegaDrive	6.5/10
Eurogamer	7/10
Famitsu	6/10, 7/10, 6/10, 5/10
IGN	8/10
Jeuxvideo.com	14/20
Mega Fun	69%
Nintendo Life	8/10
Super Game Power	3.5/5
Computer+Videogiochi	71/100
Games Amusement Pleasure	78%
Mega	68%
Mega Console	75/100
Sega Pro	81%

The Japanese publication Micom BASIC Magazine ranked the game eighth in popularity in its October 1994 issue, and it received a 20.9/30 score in a poll conducted by Mega Drive Fan and a 7.72/10 score in a 1995 readers' poll conducted by the Japanese Sega Saturn Magazine, ranking among Sega Mega Drive titles at the number 178 spot. Pulseman received generally favorable reviews from critics when it was released on the Virtual Console for the Wii, holding a rating of 80% based on four reviews according to review aggregator GameRankings.
