= Pokémon Quest =

Free-to-play video game

- Icon for Nintendo Switch
- Developer: Game Freak
- Publishers: Nintendo Switch: JP: The Pokémon Company; WW: Nintendo; iOS/Android; The Pokémon Company
- Director: Tetsuya Watanabe
- Producers: Tetsuya Watanabe; Hitoshi Yamagami; Kazunori Sugiura; Takanori Sowa
- Designers: Takeshi Kawachimaru; Kei Setoguchi
- Programmers: Kazuki Saita; Satoshi Muramatsu
- Artist: Tsubasa Matsuzaki
- Composers: Teruo Taniguchi; Takahiro Eguchi; Fumihisa Tanaka; Shinji Hosoe
- Series: Pokémon
- Engine: Unity
- Platforms: Nintendo Switch, Android, iOS
- Release: Nintendo Switch; May 30, 2018; Android, iOS; June 27, 2018
- Genre: Action role-playing
- Mode: Single-player

Pokémon Quest is a free-to-play action role-playing game in the Pokémon series developed by Game Freak. It was released for the Nintendo Switch in May 2018, and for Android and iOS in June 2018. Within a week of its release, it had reached over 7.5 million downloads.

== Gameplay ==
Pokémon Quest features a blocky, voxel-style design similar to Minecraft. The game is set in Tumblecube Island, featuring cube-shaped Pokémon called "Pokéxel". The Pokémon featured in the game are from the original lineup from the Kanto region in Pokémon Red and Blue. In the game, players control the base camp and the Pokémon team. The player's main task is to complete all the levels on the island, beating the wild Pokémon. The game process can be divided into four parts: base camp management, going on expeditions, training and optimising Pokémon, and attracting new Pokémon.

=== Base camp management ===
The base camp helps the player progress in the game. Players are able to prepare dishes to attract new Pokémon, set up decorations for various effects, and receive new Pokémon that visit the campsite once every 22 hours. There is also a Poké Mart that allows the player to purchase DLC Packs, Decorations and Box Expansions. Players can also claim 50 PM Tickets (game's currency) every 22 hours, where the amount a player receives can increase with the purchase of DLC Packs. PM Tickets are used to purchase Decorations and Box Expansions, as well as instantly completing a dish and recharging the energy for Expeditions.

=== Expeditions ===
The player's team needs to clear the island from wild Pokémon. To do this, players need to go through 12 locations, each with 3 to 7 levels. For each level players can bring up to three Pokémon with them. Pokémon can not only attack but also use special attacking or defensive moves. In total, the game has 167 unique movesets distributed in such a way that each Pokémon has from 2 to 11 special moves. After using a special move the Pokémon needs to wait a few seconds (depending on the move used) to restore it. During this time it can only use normal attacks. Each level's completion opens access to the next level in the location.

=== Getting new Pokémon ===
Players can attract new Pokémon by preparing food. For this, there is a cooking pot in the base camp. Depending on the ingredients, one of the 18 possible dishes will be cooked. Different dishes call on Pokémon of different types. Ingredients are obtained primarily from expeditions, but it can also be obtained from recycling unused Power Stones. Ingredients are classified by their colour, hardness, type and rarity. Rarer Pokémon are attracted to dishes that use rare ingredients. The cooking pot used determines the bonus stats and the level of Pokémon that it attracts, where the better the pot used the more ingredients it has to use to cook.

=== Pokémon training and optimization ===
Pokémon can level up by going on expeditions or through training. Training a Pokémon uses other Pokémon to gain experience and once the training is done, the support Pokémon will leave. A player can also train their Pokémon to replace the Pokémon's current moveset, using other Pokémon as support Pokémon. If the player uses the same species or the same type of Pokémon as the support Pokémon, the amount of experience gained and the chances of changing a move is increased compared to using random Pokémon as support Pokémon. Although, the experience gained and the chances of changing the moveset decreases after every training done on the Pokémon.

Each Pokémon have their own Power Charms, where special stones called "Power Stones" can be inserted to increase the Pokémon's stats. Mighty Stones increase attack and Sturdy Stones increase the HP. The stones can be put into the Pokémon's Power Stone slots. These stones may also contain special effects that improves various stats such as Movement Speed or Critical Hit Rate. Other than the Mighty Stones and Sturdy Stones, special kinds of rare stones can be put onto the slots next to the move of the Pokémon. These stones can give the moves further advantages towards their use. It is also noted that certain moves can equip certain types of special stones.

== Release ==
Pokémon Quest was announced during a press conference held by The Pokémon Company on May 30, 2018, and released on the eShop as a free-to-start title for the Nintendo Switch later that same day. It was also announced that a mobile version will be released for iOS and Android devices in late June 2018. Pokémon Quest was released on Android and iOS on June 27, 2018. It was the first Pokémon spin-off developed entirely in-house by Game Freak, the developers of the main Pokémon games. Since launch, Pokémon Quest has had no significant updates and—apart from the Chinese version, where it is known as Pokémon Adventure Treasure Hunt (Note: (Simplified Chinese: 宝可梦探险寻宝, Pinyin: Bǎo kě mèng tànxiǎn xúnbǎo))—only the first generation of Pokémon are included.

== Reception ==
Reception

Aggregate score
Aggregator	Score
Metacritic	NS: 64/100 (Note: Score based on 12 reviews); IOS: 62/100 (Note: Score based on four reviews)

Review scores
Publication	Score
Game Informer	6/10
IGN	6/10
Nintendo Life	7/10

Pokémon Quest received "mixed or average" reviews according to review aggregator Metacritic. Critics felt that the gameplay was repetitive. Kotaku and IGN's reviewers thought that the mostly automated battles were the gameplay's least entertaining aspect. Game Informer thought they were unengaging, while Eurogamer described them as "nice simple fun". Kotaku and Eurogamer noted that, in most battles where the player's team was stronger than the enemies, players could simply leave the game running completely automated without requiring any input.

All three critics considered customizing their team and their Pokémon's Power Stones the most enjoyable part of the game. IGN felt that the RNG involved in obtaining good Pokémon and developing good moves for them made the gameplay loop much less enjoyable, writing that the "grindy gameplay loop of searching for perfection is just plain addictive, even if it's not all that fun". However, Game Informer fully bemoaned the "uninteresting gameplay, frustrating collection mechanics, and tedious grinding", and felt that it was unmemorable and failed to live up to other Pokémon titles.

Critics agreed that Pokémon Quest was better suited for mobile platforms than consoles because of its less awkward controls and long wait times between the battery recharges. Nintendo Life criticized the wait times.

Within two days of its release, the game had received over one million downloads. After one week, the game reached more than 7.5 million downloads worldwide, with first-week revenue exceeding $3 million on iOS and Android. During its first month on iOS and Android, the game received nearly 8 million downloads and grossed $8 million on the mobile platforms. By the end of 2018, the game had crossed 10 million mobile downloads.
