= Little Town Hero =

2019 video game

- Little Town Hero icon
- Developer: Game Freak
- Publisher: Game Freak
- Director: Masao Taya
- Producer: Masafumi Saito
- Designer: Atsushi Terachi
- Artist: Haruka Tochigi
- Writer: Masao Taya
- Composers: Toby Fox; Hitomi Sato
- Engine: Unity
- Platforms: Nintendo Switch; PlayStation 4; Xbox One; Windows
- Release: Nintendo Switch; WW: October 16, 2019; PlayStation 4; JP: April 23, 2020; NA: June 23, 2020; EU: June 26, 2020; Xbox One; WW: July 2, 2020; Windows; WW: July 9, 2020
- Genre: Role-playing game
- Mode: Single-player

Little Town Hero (Note: リトルタウンヒーロー (Ritoru Taun Hīrō)) is a 2019 role-playing video game developed and published by Game Freak for the Nintendo Switch. It was originally released in October 2019 before being ported to PlayStation 4, Xbox One and Windows in 2020. It received mixed reviews from critics.

== Development ==
Game Freak announced the game under the working title of Town in September 2018. The company shared no further information through August of the next year, when it registered a trademark. The game was released for the Nintendo Switch on October 16, 2019. The game's soundtrack was primarily written by Toby Fox, an indie developer best known for creating Undertale. In January 2020, it was announced that the game would have a retail collector's edition, published by NIS America, in June 2020. That same month, it was also announced that it would be released for the PlayStation 4 in Japan on April 23, 2020, published at retail by Rainy Frog. In addition, ports for Xbox One and Windows were respectively released on July 2 and July 9, 2020.

== Reception ==
Reception

Aggregate score
| Aggregator | Score |
|---|---|
| Metacritic | NS: 64/100 |

Review scores
| Publication | Score |
|---|---|
| Destructoid | 4/10 |
| GameSpot | 5/10 |
| GamesRadar+ | 3/5 |
| IGN | 7/10 |
| Nintendo Life | 7/10 |
| Nintendo World Report | 9/10 |
| RPGamer | 3/5 |
| USgamer | 2/5 |

Little Town Hero received "mixed or average" reviews according to review aggregator Metacritic. IGN's Tom Marks gave it a 7/10, saying "Little Town Hero exudes charm from every corner of its adorable little village, and couples that personality with an absurd and utterly unique combat system full of combos I loved discovering." GamesRadar's Jordan Gerblick gave it a 3/5, saying "An exercise in battle strategy and patience for its flaws, Little Town Hero knows where its strengths lie, and thankfully you'll see more strengths than flaws if you invest in them."
