= Pocket Card Jockey =

2013 video game

- Developer: Game Freak
- Publisher: Game Freak: WW: Nintendo (3DS)
- Director: Masao Taya
- Producer: Tetsuya Watanabe
- Designers: Go Ichinose; Masao Taya; Toshihiro Obata
- Programmers: Masao Taya; Toshihiro Obata; Yu Muto
- Artists: Kenkichi Toyama; Kumiko Ito; Masumi Sugiyama; Masato Misaki
- Writer: Masao Taya
- Composer: Go Ichinose
- Platforms: Nintendo 3DS, iOS, Android; Ride On! iOS, macOS, tvOS, Nintendo Switch
- Release: Nintendo 3DS: JP: July 31, 2013; WW: May 5, 2016; iOS, Android: JP: November 26, 2014; Ride On!: iOS, macOS, tvOS; WW: January 20, 2023 Nintendo Switch; WW: February 21, 2024
- Genre: Card game
- Mode: Single-player

Pocket Card Jockey (Note: Known in Japan as SolitiBa (ソリティ馬)) is a card-based video game developed and published by Game Freak for Nintendo 3DS, iOS, and Android.

It was released for Nintendo 3DS in Japan on July 31, 2013 and worldwide by Nintendo on May 5, 2016. It was released for iOS and Android in Japan on November 26, 2014, but this version shut down on December 21, 2015.

A remake, Pocket Card Jockey: Ride On!, (Note: Known in Japan as SolitiBa Ride On! (ソリティ馬 Ride On!)) was released on iOS via Apple Arcade on January 20, 2023 (January 21, 2023 in Japan) and on Nintendo Switch on February 21, 2024.

== Plot ==
Pocket Card Jockey puts players in control of a jockey, which can be made male or female. The male jockey wants to one day take over his father's orange farm, and the female jockey wants to one day get married and have kids. The jockey loses their first round and gets trampled, leading to an angel descending on them to give them encouragement and teach them to view horse racing as a game of solitaire.

== Gameplay ==
Pocket Card Jockey's gameplay uses the card game golf as a basis for its gameplay. In golf, the player must clear all cards from the field, which they accomplish by selecting a card that is either one point higher or one point lower than the focus card that they drew from their deck. Once this is done, they can then attempt to get another card that is one higher or lower than the card they just picked up. The Ace and King cards are the opposite ends of the card sequence, and the player can move from an Ace to a King, and vice versa. The player can keep doing this until there are no more cards in the play field, at which point the player has to flip a card from their deck and begin the process anew with that one. Once the deck runs out of cards and the player runs out of cards to select from the play field, the round ends. An extra mode exists which allows the player to play the card game outside of the context of the racing game, aiming to clear the cards in the fastest time possible.

How well the player performs in the card portion determines how successful their horse is in the race. The more cards left in the play field when the round ends, and the more times the player fails a round in a race, the more likely their horse will do poorly or potentially run amok. Successful rounds will increase the unity between the jockey and their horse, leading to better positioning in the forthcoming race. The more cards left over in the deck, the better unity gain they achieve, and excess unity is converted to energy. The player uses the Nintendo 3DS' touchscreen to determine their horse's position on the racetrack, needing to take into account positioning of other horses. After a few rounds of cards and positioning, the player enters the homestretch portion. All of the excess energy from unity is converted to enthusiasm for this; the more enthusiasm, the better potential the horse has to win. Due to the randomness of the cards and competing horses, some aspects of the race will come down to luck.

Horses go through a period of the game called Growth Mode, where the player's horse spends two years growing until they hit maturity. These two years are spent winning races, leading to the horse's stamina and speed increasing. Once the horse matures, they stop leveling up, and the player must win as many races as they can with it. Once the horse has lose three races (meaning second place or worse), the horse must be retired. Upon retirement, they will be sent to the farm to breed. The better the horse performed before retirement, the better their offspring will be. This offspring will go through the same loop, though you can also go through this loop with a horse you purchase from a non-playable character.

== Development and release ==
On July 19, 2013, Game Freak posted a teaser to their official website, featuring a horse-like silhouette and mentioning a new "collaboration". On July 23, 2013, this project was revealed to be SolitiBa, set for release the following week on July 31, 2013 as a download-exclusive title. A demo for the game was released on the eShop on December 4, 2013.

In August 2014, it was announced that the game would be ported to iOS and Android. A beta test of the Android version was run with 2000 players; applications ran from August 19 to September 8, 2014, and the beta test ran from September 17 to 28, 2014. The mobile version was released on November 26, 2014.

On October 22, 2015, it was announced that the mobile version of the game would shut down on December 21, 2015.

In the 3 March 2016 Nintendo Direct, an English localization of the game was announced, with the title Pocket Card Jockey. The English localization received a demo before release. It was released on May 5, 2016 in North America, Europe, and Australia.

== Reception ==
Reception

Aggregate scores
| Aggregator | Score |
|---|---|
| Metacritic | 83/100 |
| OpenCritic | 81% recommend |

Review scores
| Publication | Score |
|---|---|
| Destructoid | 9.5/10 |
| Game Informer | 7/10 |
| Nintendo Life | 7/10 |
| Nintendo World Report | 9/10 |
| USgamer | 4/5 |

Pocket Card Jockey received "generally favorable reviews" according to review aggregator, Metacritic.

Both Kat Bailey and Nadia Oxford of USgamer counted Pocket Card Jockey as one of their favorite games of 2016, with Oxford calling it "unorthodox but brilliant." NintendoWorldReport writer Neal Ronaghan felt that the game combined solitaire with horse racing well, offering praise to its writing while criticizing it for being "frustrating and punitive at times." In NintendoWorldReport's end of year awards for 2016, Pocket Card Jockey was ranked as the fifth best. Ronaghan felt that it had been unlikely to come out of Japan, stating that once it did, it took the staff "by storm." Ronaghan called its systems "shockingly deep," though they note that its "convoluted and long tutorials" prevented it from being ranked more highly.

CJ Andriessen of Destructoid said that he was addicted to the game, comparing its gameplay loop to Tetris and said that he hoped that the game was on every Nintendo console in the future. He praised it for its "wonderfully funny" script, though he found it strange how the game handles the motivations of the male and female protagonists. Andrew Webster of The Verge similarly found it addicting, noting that while it starts out "incredibly challenging" but becomes more manageable once the player gets used to it. PCMag writer Will Greenwald called it an "incredibly fun, accessible diversion" due to its JRPG-like features. Game Revolution writer Kevin Schaller praised it for how easy it is to get into, though they felt that the raising and breeding mechanic was too limited. GamesRadar+ writer Lucas Sullivan strongly recommended it for people who enjoy card games, stating that he was surprised that he found himself enjoying a horse-racing game. Sullivan praised the game for its art style and music. Nintendo Life praised the overall gameplay, but felt the game could be unfair to the player, saying that "It flirts with the line where difficulty is replaced by mean-spirited design".
