= Giga Wrecker =

2017 video game

- Windows title screen
- Developer: Game Freak
- Publisher: Rising Star Games (Note: Game Freak published the game in Japan and the Windows version)
- Director: Masayuki Onoue
- Producer: Tetsuya Watanabe
- Designers: Hiroto Ito; Asagiri
- Composers: Shinji Hosoe; Teruo Taniguchi; Takahiro Eguchi
- Engine: Unity
- Platforms: Windows, Switch, PlayStation 4, Xbox One
- Release: Windows; February 6, 2017; Switch, PS4, Xbox One; April 29, 2019
- Genre: Puzzle-platform

Giga Wrecker is a puzzle-platform game developed by Game Freak and published by Rising Star Games. It was released for Windows in February 2017 and Nintendo Switch, PlayStation 4, and Xbox One as Giga Wrecker Alt. in April 2019.

In Giga Wrecker, the main character Reika smashes obstacles and enemies into debris, then fashions the debris into weapons, balls, cubes, and other tools with which to fight stronger enemies, solve puzzles, and maneuver to new areas.

== Plot ==
In a world mostly destroyed from a war between humans and robotic attackers known as "Ajith" (in the Alt. translation; "Ajeet" in the original translation), Reika Rekkeiji is imprisoned in a work camp run by the Ajith. A mysterious assailant frees her from captivity yet then proceeds to attempt to kill Reika, shooting her in the arm. Reika is saved from death by an eccentric scientist and given a refashioned cybernetic arm with "ARCHE" nanomachine technology. The freakishly large and powerful arm allows Reika to infiltrate the robotic factories, appearing as a normal robot to sensors. She also finds other once-human cyborgs seemingly working for the Ajith. Reika attempts to discover the truth behind the situation while fighting the robots with rubble fashioned into weapons by the nanomachines in her new arm.

== Gameplay ==
Giga Wrecker is a 2D puzzle-platform game, with the player controlling Reika as she jumps and maneuvers through various areas. Most rooms tend to have a puzzle aspect where Reika must find debris in a variety of ways, breaking down objects or minor enemies, then reshape the debris into useful tools - creating bridges to cross gaps, debris balls to smash larger enemies with, blocks to stand on, and so on. Destroying enemies for the first time as well as solving certain puzzles grants upgrade points which can be used to make Reika stronger and give her minor new abilities. The expanding map has Metroidvania elements, although new areas are generally opened by finding a sufficient number of keys to unlock an area rather than new abilities that clear an obstruction. If Reika loses all her health from obstacles or enemies, the player simply restarts the room; a restart can also be forced by the player with a "Tachyon Pulse" if the room has descended into an unwinnable state.

After completing an area, there is generally a boss fight awaiting Reika against a fellow cyborg ("Astra"), who will be far more powerful and dangerous than the normal enemy robots that inhabit the location.

The Alt. release for consoles includes a hint robot in the form of new character Dölma that can be accessed for players having difficulty solving rooms, a new difficulty mode, an updated English translation, some story revisions (including a post-credits scene), and additional rooms to explore and solve.

== Reception ==
Giga Wrecker received mixed reviews according to review aggregator Metacritic. Kyle LeClair of Hardcore Gaming gave the PC version a positive review, praising the environments, puzzles, combat, and bosses; less positively, LeClair found the English translation awkward, though he still found the plot interesting. For the 2019 release, Nintendo Life considered the combat "forgettable" and criticized the retro-anime style as uninspired, but liked the game otherwise, especially the addition of the hint robot for the game's more obtuse puzzles. Laura Francis of Eurogamer praised the core gameplay conceit, that of smashing up things to make giant debris balls which smash even larger things, as an enjoyable idea, but found the soundtrack uninspired and the physics engine overly finicky at times. Steve Watts of GameSpot was more derisive, calling the game a "hunk of junk". Watts felt that the boss battles were enjoyable and a good challenge, but that there were too few of them compared to the platforming and puzzle-solving, which he felt were unforgiving and frustrating.
