= HarmoKnight =

2012 video game

- Developer: Game Freak
- Publisher: Nintendo
- Director: James Turner
- Producers: Tetsuya Watanabe; Hitoshi Yamagami
- Designers: Shigeru Ohmori; Kazumasa Iwao; Masahiro Takei; Yohei Asoaka
- Programmers: Hisashi Sogabe; Nozomu Saito; Seigen Ojima
- Composers: Minako Adachi; Nobuo Kiyota; Kiyoto Ohtani; Kiyohiro Sada
- Platform: Nintendo 3DS
- Release: JP: September 5, 2012; WW: March 28, 2013
- Genres: Rhythm, platformer
- Mode: Single-player

HarmoKnight, known in Japan as Rhythm Hunter: HarmoKnight (リズムハンター ハーモナイト, Rizumu Hantā: HāmoNaito), is a rhythm-platform video game developed by Game Freak and published by Nintendo for the Nintendo 3DS. The game was released on the Nintendo eShop in Japan on September 5, 2012, and internationally on March 28, 2013. The game received positive reviews from critics for its unique gameplay and presentation.

== Gameplay ==
Players control a young boy named Tempo as he travels through automatically scrolling levels. The main gameplay is limited to two buttons, the B button for jumping and the A button to swing Tempo's staff. The goal of each level is to gather as many notes as possible, either found throughout the level or earned by hitting enemies and optional percussion plants. These actions correspond with the rhythm of the music. Players can also charge up their staff to earn extra notes when hitting enemies. Many of these levels feature multiple routes which the player can take to achieve a higher score or locate hidden bonuses such as Pinklefs. If Tempo is hit by an enemy or obstacle, he will lose a heart, failing the level if he loses all of his hearts or falls down a pit, though he can regain hearts by cracking open eggs found in stages. At the end of each stage, the player will earn a grade based on how many notes they gathered, along with Royal Notes used to access new areas on the world map. If the player receives a Great grade on a level, a faster version of that level is unlocked. Levels have varying themes, including levels presented in 3/4 time and levels where the speed changes. Some segments will switch control over to other characters, such as Lyra who uses a crossbow, and Tyko who deals with high and low enemies, whilst others see Tempo riding in a special cart. Levels soon culminate in various boss fights, which require Tempo to repeat actions issued by the enemy. The game also features bonus stages featuring music from the Pokémon series.

== Plot ==
On a musical planet known as Melodia, a boy named Tempo is training alongside his rabbit companion, Tappy. One day, a meteor crash lands on Melodia, bringing with it the evil Gargan and his army of Noizoids, who start disrupting the peace on the planet. Discovering a mysterious note staff capable of fighting off the Noizoids, Tempo is sent by his master, Woodwin, to travel to Symphony City to deliver the note to someone with the potential to become a HarmoKnight. Along the way, he meets an archer named Lyra, a buff warrior named Tyko, and his monkey companion, Cymbi. Upon arriving in Symphony City, however, its princess, Ariana, is kidnapped by Gargan, who puts its citizens into slumber. It is now up to Tempo and his companions to fight against the Noizoids and save the princess.

== Development and release ==
HarmoKnight came about after Game Freak changed its internal structure, allowing staff members to initiate new projects whilst still being able to work on the Pokémon franchise. The game was created by James Turner, who developed the idea from a desire to create a simple action platformer, which soon developed into a rhythm platformer. Producer Shigeru Ohmori was later brought onto the project, helping to expand on the gameplay.

The game was announced during a Nintendo Direct presentation on August 29, 2012, with a playable demo released on the Japanese Nintendo eShop shortly afterward. The game was later announced for an upcoming release in North America, as well as a March 2013 release for Europe. A demo was released on the North American Nintendo eShop on March 14, 2013.

== Reception ==
Reception

Aggregate score
| Aggregator | Score |
|---|---|
| Metacritic | 73/100 |

Review scores
| Publication | Score |
|---|---|
| Destructoid | 9/10 |
| Edge | 8/10 |
| Electronic Gaming Monthly | 7.0/10 |
| Game Informer | 8.5/10 |
| GameRevolution | 8/10 |
| GameSpot | 6/10 |
| IGN | 8.5/10 |
| Joystiq | 3/5 |
| Nintendo Life | 8/10 |
| Nintendo World Report | 9/10 |
| Official Nintendo Magazine | 78/100 |
| Pocket Gamer | 2.5/5 |

HarmoKnight received "mixed or average" reviews according to review aggregator Metacritic. IGN gave the game a score of 8.5, calling it "a must-have eShop game for any Nintendo fan who enjoys some well-needed harmony". ComputerAndVideoGames.com gave the game a score of 7.6, praising its satisfying gameplay and charming presentation, whilst criticising unforgiving timing and a limited lifespan. Edge gave the game 8/10, praising its music and presentation whilst noting that grading is a little too forgiving sometimes. Destructoid gave the game 9/10, calling it "a mashup of all the best bits of past rhythm genre greats".

== Legacy ==
Tempo appears as a collectible trophy in Super Smash Bros. for Nintendo 3DS and as a Spirit in Super Smash Bros. Ultimate.
