= Regi (Pokémon) =

Group of Pokémon species

The Regis
- Pokémon characters
- (from left to right) Regice, Registeel, and Regirock as they appear in the Pokémon anime
- First appearance: Pokémon Ruby and Sapphire (2002) (Regirock, Regice, Registeel); Pokémon Diamond and Pearl (2006) (Regigigas); Pokémon Sword and Shield: The Crown Tundra (2020) (Regieleki, Regidrago)

In-universe information
- Full name: Regirock, Regice, Registeel, Regigigas, Regieleki, and Regidrago
- Species: Pokémon
- Type: List: Rock (Regirock); Ice (Regice); Steel (Registeel); Normal (Regigigas); Electric (Regieleki); Dragon (Regidrago)

Regirock (レジロック, Rejirokku), Regice (レジアイス, Rejiaisu), Registeel (レジスチル, Rejisuchiru), Regigigas (レジギガス, Rejigigasu), Regieleki (レジエレキ, Rejiereki), and Regidrago (レジドラゴ, Rejidorago), collectively referred to as the Regis, the Legendary Giants, or the Legendary Titans, are Pokémon species in Nintendo and Game Freak's Pokémon franchise. Regirock, Regice, and Registeel were first introduced in the 2002 video games Pokémon Ruby and Sapphire, Regigigas was first introduced in the 2006 games Pokémon Diamond and Pearl, and Regieleki and Regidrago were first introduced in the 2020 Pokémon Sword and Shield downloadable content expansion pack The Crown Tundra. In Pokémon lore, Regigigas towed continents into place and created the five inorganic Regis. All Regis are sealed away, left to be discovered by players.

During development of Pokémon Ruby and Sapphire, designer Ken Sugimori and his team decided to create more complex humanoid designs, in contrast with the more "babyish" designs of the prior games. The Regis have been met with a mixed response from critics, having been criticized for their inorganic appearance. Regigigas has received commentary for its in-battle weakness due to its ability Slow Start. The Regis have been the subject of urban legends and various Internet memes.

== Conception and design ==
Regirock, Regice, Registeel, Regigigas, Regieleki, and Regidrago are species of fictional creatures called Pokémon created for the Pokémon media franchise. Developed by Game Freak and published by Nintendo, the Japanese franchise began in 1996 with the video games Pokémon Red and Green for the Game Boy, which were later released in North America as Pokémon Red and Blue in 1998. In these games and their sequels, the player assumes the role of a Trainer whose goal is to capture and use the creatures' special abilities to combat other Pokémon. Some Pokémon can transform into stronger species through a process called evolution via various means, such as exposure to specific items. Each Pokémon has one or two elemental types, which define its advantages and disadvantages when battling other Pokémon. A major goal in each game is to complete the Pokédex, a comprehensive Pokémon encyclopedia, by capturing, evolving, and trading with other Trainers to obtain individuals from all Pokémon species.

Regirock, Regice, and Registeel were introduced in the 2002 sequels Pokémon Ruby and Sapphire. When designing the games, Game Freak initially wanted to not include any of the Pokémon from the previous games, with lead artist Ken Sugimori using this as an opportunity to push the concept of what a Pokémon could look like. To this end, he wanted to try more "humanoid" designs and also emphasize "cooler" ones, due to feedback the team had received that Pokémon was seen as too "babyish". Additionally, while the previous Pokémon Gold and Silver species were bound to simplistic designs for the sake of the related anime and toy manufacturing, Sugimori stated in an interview he said "screw it" and focused on more complex and fleshed out designs with these games. As the art team developed the Pokémon species, Sugimori would finalize their work and draw the promotional art, altering details as he felt necessary.

(from left to right) Regidrago, Regieleki, and Regigigas as they appear in official artwork for the series

Following the introduction of Regirock, Regice, and Registeel in Ruby and Sapphire, Regigigas was introduced in the 2006 games Pokémon Diamond and Pearl, where it was introduced as Regirock, Regice, and Registeel's in-universe master. Regigigas has an in-battle ability known as Slow Start, meant to reflect its long period of dormancy in-universe. Slow Start halves Regigigas's attack power and speed for five in-battle turns. Pokémon Sword and Shield's downloadable content expansion pass The Crown Tundra introduced two more members to the group, Regieleki and Regidrago. The latter pair were revealed in a Nintendo Direct trailer covering the Pokémon Sword and Shield Expansion Pass, with no other information given barring their designs. A press release later that year confirmed the identities of the Pokémon. The Regis have alternately been referred to by several other names, including the Legendary Giants and Legendary Titans.

== Appearances ==
Regirock, Regice, and Registeel first appeared in Pokémon Ruby and Sapphire. In the games, they are hidden Legendary Pokémon who are sealed away in temple-like structures scattered throughout the game's main location of Hoenn. Players must translate braille messages to solve puzzles, which, when completed, will allow the player to encounter and battle them. In-universe, they are creations of the Legendary Pokémon Regigigas, who, in the past, had towed the continents into their current place and created all five of the Regis. Regigigas was sealed away in Snowpoint Temple in the Sinnoh region, the main location of sequel games Pokémon Diamond and Pearl, and the other Regis sealed themselves away.

Regigigas later appeared in Diamond and Pearl, still sealed in Snowpoint Temple. The player must bring a Regirock, Regice, and Registeel to Regigigas, which will cause it to awaken and initiate combat. In Pokémon Platinum, a group of three ruins containing Regirock, Regice, and Registeel can be unlocked by obtaining a Regigigas from a special real-world distribution event, allowing the player to obtain the trio, who are not normally available in Platinum. The four made subsequent reappearances in Pokémon Black 2 and White 2, Pokémon Omega Ruby and Alpha Sapphire, and Pokémon Ultra Sun and Ultra Moon.

Pokémon Sword and Shield: The Crown Tundra introduced two new Regis: Regieleki and Regidrago. In the games' lore, Regieleki and Regidrago were created by Regigigas, but sealed away in the Crown Tundra by humans, with Regieleki being fitted with rings onto its body in order to better contain its power. The pair are obtainable after Regirock, Regice, and Registeel are captured, with the pair being contained in a temple known as the Split-Decision Ruins. The player can only capture one of their choice in a given playthrough of the game. Regigigas is obtainable once all five other Regis are obtained, being fightable in a special raid battle. Regirock, Regice, and Registeel later appear in the remakes of Diamond and Pearl, Pokémon Brilliant Diamond and Shining Pearl, where they are obtainable alongside other Legendary Pokémon. Once all three are obtained, they can be used to reawaken Regigigas like in the original games. Regigigas later appears by itself, still in Snowpoint Temple, in Pokémon Legends: Arceus, which is set in the distant past of Pokémon Diamond and Pearl. All six Regis can be obtained in Pokémon Scarlet and Violet, but only through transferring them into the games from past games in the series.

All six Regis appear in the spin-off game Pokémon Go. A Regigigas appears as a boss at Hippowdon Temple in Pokémon Ranger: Shadows of Almia. To access the battle, the player needs to have completed the browser and caught Registeel, Regirock and Regice, who are required to unlock the area of the dungeon where Regigigas is located. the Pokémon anime, all six Regis appear. A powerful trainer named Brandon owns a Regirock, Regice, and Registeel, and has befriended Regigigas. Protagonist Ash Ketchum battled Brandon, though lost to him initially before defeating one of his Regis in a rematch. In Pokémon Journeys: The Series, major characters Gary Oak and Goh capture Regidrago and Regieleki respectively. Various members of the Regis appear in other spin-off elements, such as the Pokémon Trading Card Game, Pokémon Mystery Dungeon: Rescue Team DX, and Pokémon Masters EX.

== Reception ==
IGN, as part of its "Pokémon of the Day" series, criticized the designs of the Regis, finding that the lack of animalistic elements in Regirock and Regice's design were unappealing in comparison to other similar designs. Though they briefly highlighted Registeel for appearing the most "plausible" of the Regis and having good in-battle utility, they felt as though the Regis' designs were not particularly strong ones. McKinley Noble of GamePro found the design of Regigigas to be a negative one in the selection of Pokémon Diamond and Pearl's Pokémon, stating that it "looks like a horrifying, mutated Christmas tree demon."

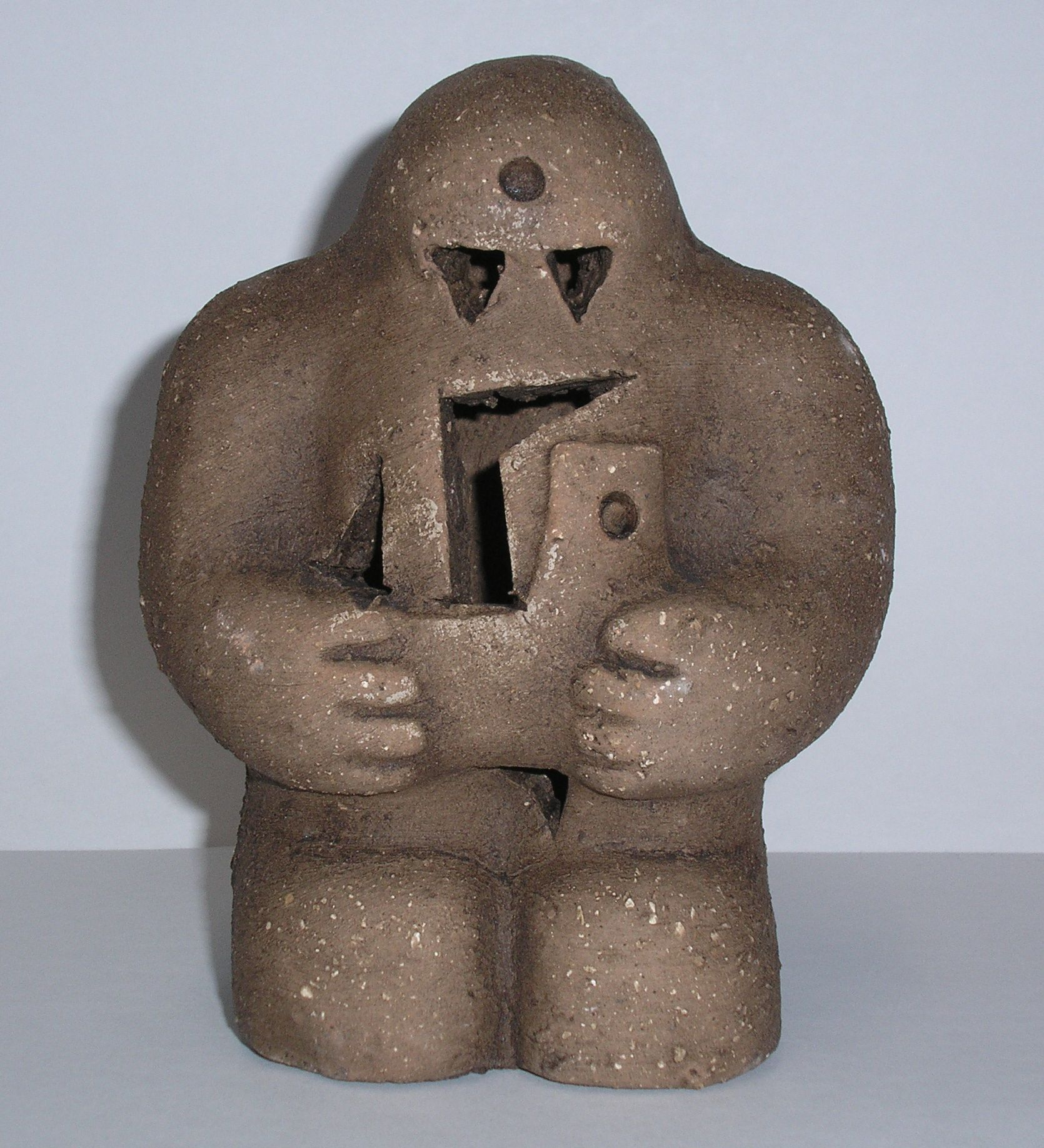
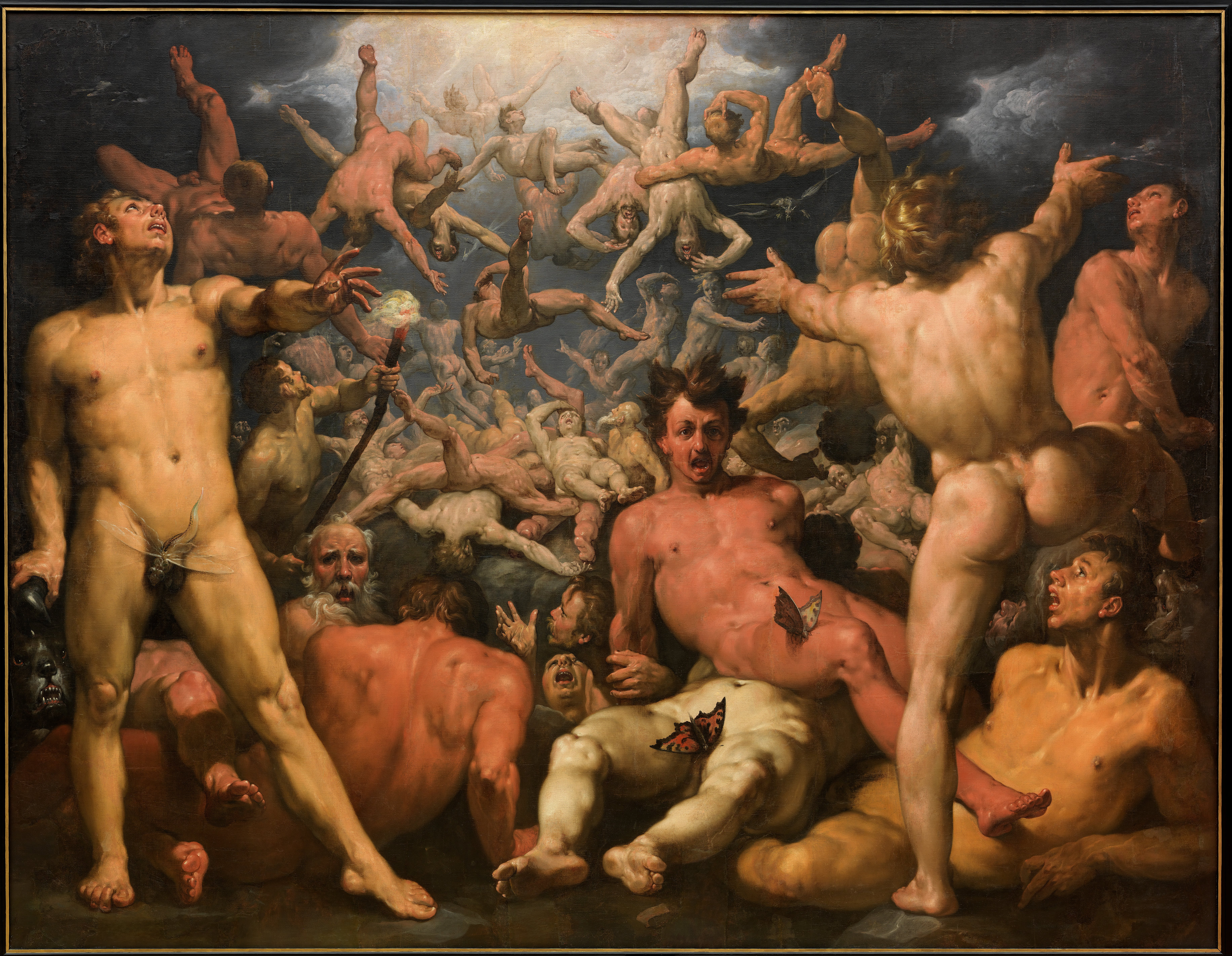
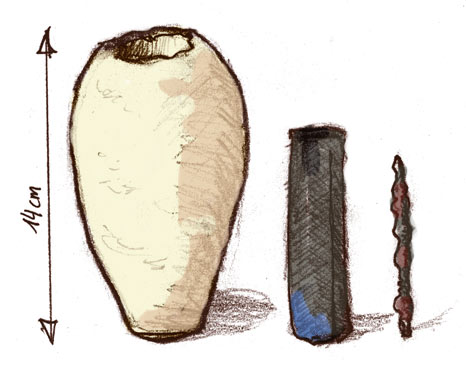
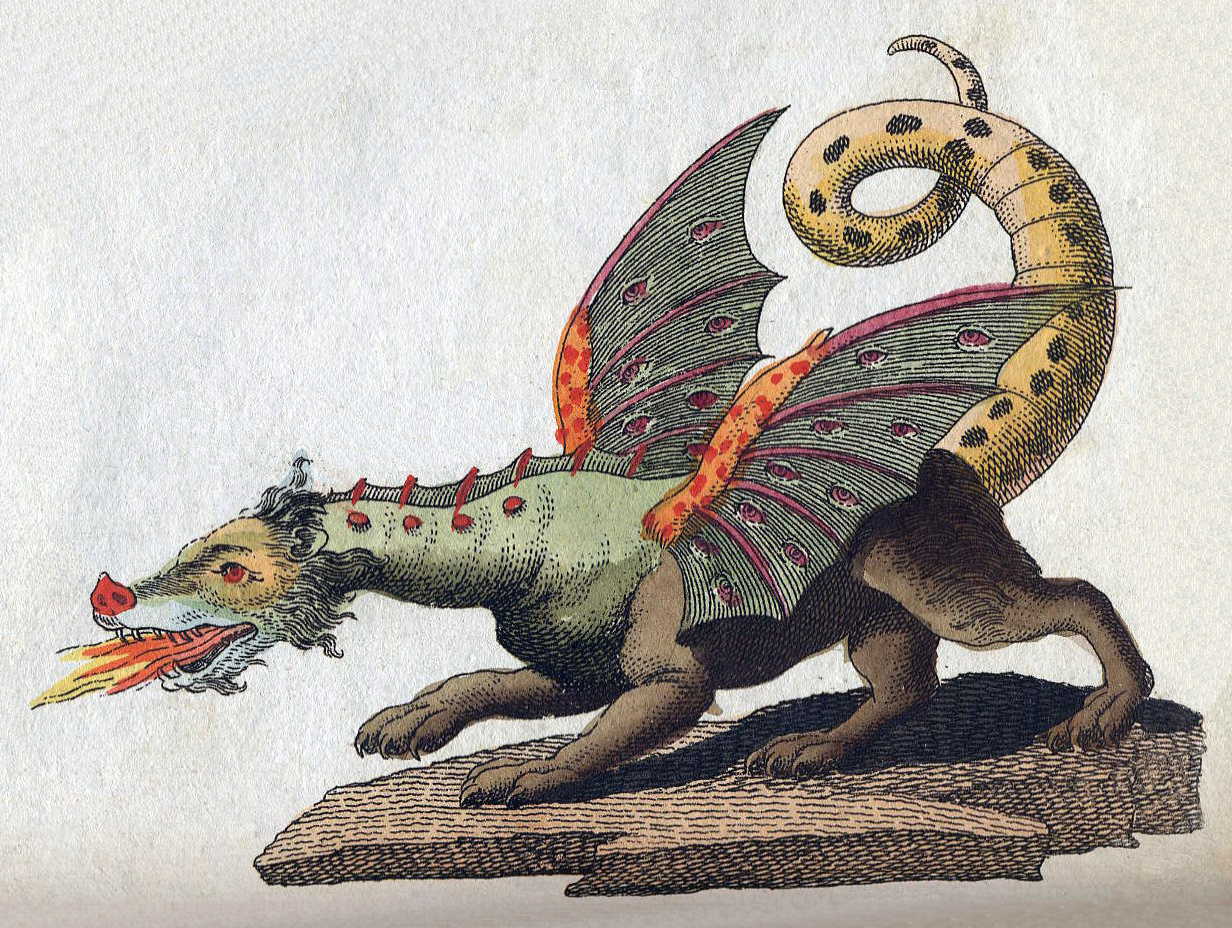
(from left to right) Potential origins discussed for the Regis included golems and the Greek Titans, while Regieleki and Regidrago were discussed as potentially being inspired by the Baghdad Battery and dragons.

Cian Maher, writing for TheGamer, analyzed the Regis' historical and mythological connotations to illustrate the deep design backgrounds of Legendary Pokémon. He highlighted the associations that the Regis had with the golems of Jewish folklore; he also analyzed the historical background of the terms "regi" and "gigas," ancient Greek terms, which indicated to him that the Regis were potentially inspired by the Titans of Greek mythology as well, believing that Regigigas being sealed away added credence to this connection. He highlighted Regieleki and Regidrago's designs, believing that their shared origins in ancient, unexplained phenomenon—such as the Baghdad Battery and dragons—showed a further experimentation of ideas used for the Regis. Matthew Wilcox, writing for Screen Rant, commented on their association with braille. He found that despite the educational intent of having children learn braille through the puzzle used to unlock the Regis, the lesson lacked a proper real-life utility, as knowing how to read braille was not a vital skill for the vast bulk of people playing the games. Despite braille's association with the Regis in the fandom, its replacement in various contexts by regular text and the Unown language in the games indicated to Wilcox the failure of the lesson overall.

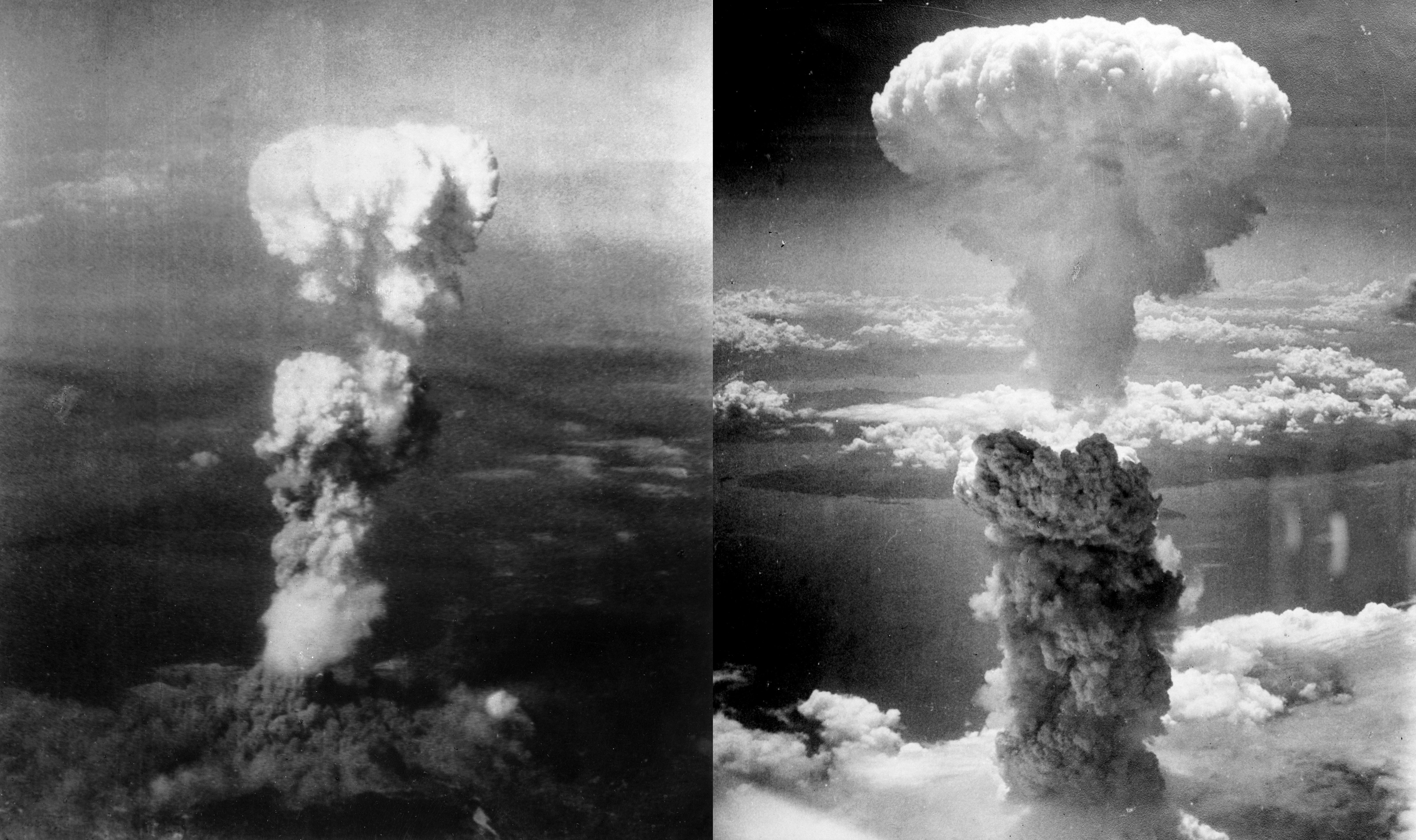
An urban legend believed the Regis to be associated with the atomic bombings in Japan.

The Regis were the subject of an urban legend during the period of Ruby and Sapphire's release, with the legend stating that the location of the Regi's chambers were emblematic of where air strikes and atomic bombings took place in Japan during World War II. This theory was further amplified by the believed real-world basis of the Hoenn region being the Kyushu region of Japan, the location of Nagasaki and many other sites hit by air strikes during the war, and by several moves learnable by the Regis, which were believed to correspond to aspects referencing nuclear war. Regigigas's in-game location in the Snowpoint Temple in the region of Sinnoh, which is based on Hokkaido, is believed to roughly correspond to the real-world location of the Monument of Peace in Japan, as well as to the Soya Kaikyo Navy War Memorial, which states "We must not repeat war once more." Alongside the Regis' own mediocre battling ability, this was believed to underscore the urban legend by providing pacifistic theming to the Regis, and to convey the tragedy of war to children. The legend was widespread at the time of Ruby and Sapphire's release, and is particularly prominent in Japan. Real Sound author Noriaki Sakata stated that the legend left an impression on him. Despite its prevalence, Pokémon developers Game Freak have not officially commented on the legend.

Regigigas's Slow Start ability has resulted in its battling capabilities receiving commentary. Inside felt that Regigigas was consistently sidelined by Game Freak due to Slow Start making it worthless in battle, while also finding that Pokémon Legends: Arceus shedding doubt on the in-game myth that Regigigas towed the continents was a further piece of disrespect to the Pokémon. Furthermore, Regigigas keeping Slow Start in Legends: Arceus, a game which removed abilities, was deemed to also be disrespectful to the Pokémon, though they also stated that it could be considered Regigigas getting "special treatment" compared to other Pokémon by being allowed to keep its signature gimmick. Screen Rant stated that the ability let Regigigas down on multiple fronts, feeling that it wasted the Pokémon's lore by having it be weak in battle. Kenneth Shepard of Kotaku found that while it made Regigigas weak in battle, Slow Start gave Regigigas, a Legendary Pokémon, a viable in-battle weakness, which he felt was something that should be more reoccurring in the series. He highlighted the "hilarious" context of the ability. Due to Slow Start, it has long been considered a joke within the Pokémon community, though it has also grown popular as a result. Pokémon Sword and Shield added the Pokémon Galarian Weezing, whose Neutralizing Gas ability caused Slow Start to be disabled while Weezing was on the field. This led to a popular strategy in Double Battles featuring Regigigas, and resulted in later competitive success. Its strength in Pokémon competitive play with this strategy after being considered weak for a long period beforehand resulted in 2022 being dubbed the "Year of Regigigas" by Inside.

The Regis have been the subjects of Internet memes. Despite their faceless and imposing appearances, the Regis have an "absurd-sounding voice," with the juxtaposition of these elements allowing them to be effectively utilized in jokes. As a result, Regi-related jokes became popular within the fandom. One account, referred to as "regirocktok", put Regirock into many different pop culture moments and situations. This was described by Kotaku author Kenneth Shepard as being a "natural endgame" for the jokes due to its progressively evolving manner. Shepard stated that memes related to the Regis made "zero sense to anyone on the outside, but is easily understood by anyone who has been online and a Pokémon fan, and who has seen how obscure fandom perceptions of something can morph into memes." Another meme, referred to as "Regitube", depicted a man wearing numerous inflatable inner tubes before he walked away covered in them. The original video was described by fans as resembling the Regis, and quickly took off within the Pokémon community, resulting in large amounts of fan works surrounding Regitube. Regitube was met with favorable responses from critics and fans alike for how it utilized the Regis concept.
