= List of Pokémon rivals =

Red and Blue, as they appear in Pokémon Origins. Red and Blue are rivals, and their competitive nature is an integral part of the rival character.

The Pokémon franchise, which began in 1996, is a series of turn-based JRPG games. In each game, the player strives to become the Champion—the strongest trainer in a given region. Along the way, they often encounter various rival characters. These rivals, who can range from antagonistic to friendly, serve as significant challenges for the player, sometimes culminating in a final confrontation. The concept of rivals in the Pokémon series has garnered both praise and criticism for its different implementations throughout the franchise.

== Role ==
Developed by Game Freak and published by Nintendo, the Pokémon franchise began in Japan in 1996 with the release of the video games Pokémon Red and Blue for the Game Boy. In these games, the player assumes the role of a Pokémon Trainer whose goal is to capture and train creatures called Pokémon. Players use the creatures' special abilities to combat other Pokémon, both in the wild as well as those used by other Trainers.

Notable Trainers in most installments are "rival" characters. Rivals are recurring characters in the games, often acting as roadblocks for the player due to their heightened difficulty compared to usual NPC Trainer battles. The first rival was introduced in Pokémon Red and Blue, with the character Blue. Blue is a standoffish character who antagonizes the player, and acts as the game's final boss.

Rival characters often differ in terms of their perception towards the player. Some rivals are similar to Blue in characterization, such as Silver, and Bede while other rivals are more friendly towards the player and engage in battles for fun, such as Brendan, May, and Hau. The latter are often more actively supportive of the player, whereas characters such as Blue often act in direct competition to the player. Some rivals, such as Cheren, Hop, and Kieran, end up going through character arcs during their rivalry with the player.

== Rivals ==
=== Blue ===
Blue Oak (Japanese: オーキド・グリーン, Hepburn: Ōkido Gurīn) is the grandson of the esteemed Professor Samuel Oak. Hailing from Pallet Town, he grew up alongside the game's protagonist, and acts as their rival throughout the game. He is always a step ahead of the player, often completing major milestones before the player does. He is very smug, often gloating about his skill compared to the player, though after his defeat at the end of the game, he begins to mellow out. He reappears in Pokémon Gold, Silver, and Crystal, where he acts as a Gym Leader, and subsequently reappears in the games' remakes, Pokémon Black 2, White 2, Sun, Moon, Let's Go, Pikachu!, and Let's Go, Eevee!. He also appears in Pokémon Stadium and its sequel, acting as the final boss of the former. Blue also appears in Pokémon Masters EX.

A counterpart to Blue, named Gary Oak (オーキド・シゲル, Ōkido Shigeru), appears in the Pokémon anime, where he serves as a rival to series's main protagonist Ash Ketchum. After being defeated during the original series, he begins to mellow out, and subsequently becomes a Pokémon Professor in Pokémon the Series: Diamond and Pearl. He later reappears in Pokémon Master Journeys: The Series, acting as a recurring character who appears as part of "Project Mew." Gary later appears in the spin-off Pokémon Puzzle League. A counterpart to Blue also appears as a major character in the Pokémon Adventures manga series.

=== Silver ===
Silver (シルバー, Shirubā) is the son of Giovanni, the boss of the criminal organization Team Rocket, who first appeared in Pokémon Gold and Silver. Following Giovanni's defeat at the hands of the player character of the original games, Silver ran away from his father. He ended up stealing a Pokémon from Professor Elm, and seeks to become the strongest Trainer in the world. He prioritizes strength above anything else and is implied to be cruel to his Pokémon throughout various points in the game. After a defeat at the hands of Lance, the Johto League Champion, Silver begins to reconsider his style of battling, and matures as a character following this.

Silver appears in Pokémon Stadium 2 as a major boss opponent, while another incarnation of him appears in Pokémon Adventures. He later appeared in Pokémon Masters EX, where he was paired up alongside the Legendary Pokémon Ho-oh.

=== Brendan and May ===
Brendan (ユウキ, Yūki) and May (ハルカ, Haruka) are the children of Professor Birch, a Professor in the Hoenn region, who first appeared in Pokémon Ruby and Sapphire. The one that is the player's rival will be of the opposite gender to that of the player: if the player selects Brendan, their rival will be May, and vice versa. Brendan and May assist Professor Birch with his research, and fight the player at various points throughout the game.

The pair reappear in Pokémon Masters EX, though Brendan is Norman's child in that game, while May is Birch's. Counterparts to them appear in Pokémon Adventures, while another counterpart of May takes on a main character role in the Pokémon anime.

=== Wally ===
Wally (ミツル, Mitsuru) is a young boy who appears in Pokémon Ruby and Pokémon Sapphire. He is a sickly child who is moving away when the player first meets them. The player helps him catch a Ralts for companionship, and Wally later reappears at various points to challenge the player, culminating in a final battle just before the Hoenn League. He later reappears in Pokémon Sun and Moon as a secret opponent, and appears in both Pokémon Masters EX and the Pokémon Adventures manga.

=== Barry ===
Barry (ジュン, Jun) is an energetic and overexcited young boy who appears in Pokémon Diamond and Pearl. He is the player's childhood best friend and the son of Frontier Brain Palmer. He often blitzes from place to place, and is highly impatient, crashing into people as he runs. He constantly attempts to "fine" others when he bumps into them.

He appears in the Pokémon anime and Pokémon Masters EX, while another version of him named Pearl appears in the Pokémon Adventures manga as a major protagonist.

=== Cheren and Bianca ===
Cheren (チェレン) and Bianca (ベル, Beru) are a pair of characters who are the childhood friends of the player character of Pokémon Black and White. Cheren is a young man who seeks to grow strong and rise to the top, while Bianca is on her journey for similar reasons. Cheren, via Alder, realizes strength is not all there is, while Bianca decides to become a Pokémon researcher after becoming independent of her overprotective father. Both reappear in the games' sequels, Pokémon Black 2 and White 2, where Cheren acts as a Gym Leader and Bianca as an aide to Professor Aurea Juniper.

Both characters appear in the Pokémon anime, Pokémon Adventures, and Pokémon Masters EX.

=== N ===
N (Enu), full name Natural Harmonia Gropius (ナチュラル・ハルモニア・グロピウス, Nachuraru Harumonia Guropiusu), is a rival character introduced in Pokémon Black and White. He was adopted by Ghetsis at a young age due to his ability to speak to and understand Pokémon, and was raised to believe humans and Pokémon should be separated. He acts as the "King" and Boss of Team Plasma, and reawakens the Legendary Pokémon Reshiram or Zekrom, depending on the player's version, to assist with his goals. After the player convinces him to abandon his goals, and Ghetsis is defeated, N flies away on his Pokémon. He later reappears in Pokémon Black 2 and White 2, saving the player character of that game from being killed by Ghetsis. After Ghetsis's defeat, he can be found in the ruins of his castle, where he will challenge the player to a final battle with his Legendary Pokémon.

N appears in various spin-off material, namely Pokémon Adventures, the Pokémon anime, and Pokémon Masters EX.

=== Hugh ===
Hugh (ヒュウ, Hyu) is the childhood friend of the player character of Pokémon Black 2 and White 2. Prior to the events of the game, his sister's Purrloin was stolen by Team Plasma, and so seeks to get it back from them. He holds a strong prejudice against them as a result, which slowly lessens as he discovers not every member of Team Plasma was truly villainous. He aids the player in defeating Ghetsis, and ends up returning his sister's Purrloin—now Liepard—to her.

Hugh reappears in Pokémon Adventures and Pokémon Masters EX.

=== Calem, Serena, Shauna, Tierno, and Trevor ===
Calem (カルム, Karemu), Serena (セレナ), Shauna (サナ, Sana), Tierno (ティエルノ, Tieruno), and Trevor (トロバ, Toroba) are a group of friends who appear in Pokémon X and Y. Only one of Calem and Serena act as a rival; the one whose gender is opposite to the player acts as the rival. Shauna is an energetic young girl who does not have a clear goal for her journey in mind, Trevor is a studious boy who seeks to complete the Pokedex, and Tierno is a young man who aspires to become a dancer and is the one who gifts the player their first Pokémon.

All five appear in Pokémon Masters EX and Pokémon Adventures, where counterparts to Calem and Serena affectionately nicknamed X and Y appear. Shauna, Tierno, and Trevor appear in the Pokémon anime, while Serena acts as a main character in Pokémon the Series: XY.

=== Hau ===
Hau (ハウ) is a young man who appears in Pokémon Sun and Moon. He is the grandson of the Melemele Island Kahua, Hala, and seeks to live up to Hala's potential. He is incredibly kind, making sure the player enjoys their stay in Alola, and loves to eat malasadas. In Pokémon Ultra Sun and Ultra Moon, he acts as the final boss opponent of the main game.

He later reappears in the Pokémon anime, Pokémon Adventures, and Pokémon Masters EX.

=== Gladion ===
Gladion (グラジオ, Gurajio) is a member of Team Skull who appears in Pokémon Sun and Moon. He acts as their "enforcer," and he ran away from home due to Lusamine's neglectful parenting. He stole the Legendary Pokémon Type: Null from them, and seeks to protect his sister, Lillie, and the Legendary Pokémon Cosmog. He assists the player in stopping Lusamine, and later takes over control of the Aether Foundation after the game is completed. In Ultra Sun and Ultra Moon, however, he instead leaves for Kanto to train to get stronger.

He appears in the Pokémon anime as a rival to Ash, and appears in Pokémon Adventures and Pokémon Masters EX.

=== Hop ===
Hop (ホップ, Hoppu) is the younger brother of Galar League Champion Leon, who appears in Pokémon Sword and Shield. He at first aspires to be as strong as Leon, seeking to become Galar League Champion, but after consistent defeats from both the player and Bede, he chooses to become a Pokémon Professor. He later captures and befriends the Legendary Pokémon Zacian or Zamazenta, depending on the version.

He later appears in the Pokémon anime, Pokémon: Twilight Wings, Pokémon Adventures, and Pokémon Masters EX.

=== Bede ===
Bede (ビート, Bīto) is a young boy who was taken in by Chairman Rose in his youth. As such, he looks up to Rose and seeks to please him. However, after destroying a mural, Rose removes the sponsorship he had given Bede, and Bede is removed from the Gym Challenge. Bede is later found by Opal, and she recruits him to succeed her as a Gym Leader. Bede confronts the player for one last battle, after which he takes over from Opal full time.

He later appears in Pokémon: Twilight Wings, Pokémon Adventures, and Pokémon Masters EX.

=== Marnie ===
Marnie (マリィ, Marī) is a young girl who appears in Pokémon Sword and Shield. She is the younger sister of Gym Leader Piers, who has enlisted Team Yell to cheer on Marnie in her goal to become Galar League Champion. Marnie acts as a rival to the player throughout the game, eventually settling it in a final battle, after which she takes over from Piers as the Gym Leader of Spikemuth.

She later appears in the Pokémon anime, Pokémon: Twilight Wings, Pokémon Adventures, and Pokémon Masters EX.

=== Klara and Avery ===
Klara (クララ, Kurara) and Avery (セイボリー, Seiborī) are a pair of rivals who appear in the Pokémon Sword and Shield DLC The Isle of Armor. Klara appears in Sword while Avery appears in Shield. Klara is a member of a punk band who seeks to become a Gym Leader, while Avery is a member of a long lineage of psychics who is weaker than others of his family, and he aims to become a Gym Leader to prove himself. Both act with rudeness towards the player and attempt to cheat to defeat them, but both eventually become Gym Leaders, as is revealed in The Crown Tundra.

=== Nemona ===
Nemona (ネモ, Nemo) is a girl who appears in Pokémon Scarlet and Violet. She is the player character's neighbor and president of the Academy's student council. She is energetic and constantly seeks Pokémon battles, though she is so strong she rarely gets to have "all-out" battles. She is occasionally known to speak Spanish. She acts as the player's rival in the "Victory Road" storyline, raising a new team to combat them. Nemona is a Champion-ranked Trainer, having defeated Top Champion Geeta in the past.

Nemona appears in Pokémon Masters EX, and appears in the animation Pokémon: Paldean Winds, acting as a rival to the character Aliquis.

=== Arven ===
Arven (ペパー, Pepā) is a young man who appears in Pokémon Scarlet and Violet, where he is the primary partner of the "Path of Legends" storyline. He is the son of Professor Sada in Scarlet and Professor Turo in Violet, and was neglected by both in his childhood, only growing up with his Mabosstiff to keep him company. After Mabosstiff is brutally injured, Arven seeks the Herba Mystica to restore his Pokémon to health.

Arven appears in Pokémon: Paldean Winds.

=== Penny ===
Penny (ボタン, Botan) is an introverted girl who hails from Galar, and the daughter of Peony. She appears in Pokémon Scarlet and Violet, where she is the main focus of the "Starfall Street" storyline, where she apparently works with the mysterious Cassiopeia, and aids the player in defeating Team Star. After the Team is disbanded, she reveals she is actually Cassiopeia, and the true boss of Team Star who took the fall for her friends after they caused a massive incident several years prior to the events of the game. She attempted to disband the Team to avoid causing more problems, and she reconciles with her friends after being defeated by the player.

Penny appears in Pokémon Masters EX.

=== Carmine and Kieran ===
Carmine (ゼイユ, Seiyu) and Kieran (スグリ, Suguri) are a pair of siblings who appear in Pokémon Scarlet and Violet's DLC, The Hidden Treasure of Area Zero. They hail from the small region of Kitakami, and attend school at the Blueberry Academy in Unova. Carmine is a headstrong and oftentimes over-excited person, who is highly overprotective of Kieran. Kieran starts out as a kind, albeit shy boy at first, who has a strong liking towards the Legendary Pokémon Ogerpon due to growing up on legends about it. When Ogerpon is discovered by the player and Carmine, Kieran is left out of the discovery. After finding out about the deception, he grows spiteful towards the player and resolves to grow stronger. He becomes the Blueberry Academy's BB League Champion, but is dethroned by the player. He later joins them on an expedition to Area Zero alongside Carmine, where he captures Terapagos in an attempt to grow stronger. Terapagos breaks free, and he later assists the player in stopping it.

== Reception ==
Early rivals were often defined by their general negative and "jerkish" attitude, and have defined the role for years afterwards. According to series director Junichi Masuda, the shift from this attitude to a more friendly one was due to greater freedom with the hardware as games developed, as well as a general distaste by the public to that kind of character. Despite this, rival characters such as Blue and Silver established a dynamic of rival that have proven popular with fans of the series. Blue's smug attitude and method of always one-upping the player in Red and Blue is considered highly iconic and a large part of what made the first games engaging for players. His eventual development in the subsequent games was met with praise. Blue's goals of becoming the strongest trainer and his significant challenge as a roadblock also helped highlight this, as it allowed the player to grow prouder upon defeating him while also echoing the franchise's core themes. Similarly, Silver's more nuanced character arc while still being painted as an antagonistic figure has been cited as helping to build a compelling character for the player to fight, with his further growth enabling for the rivalry with the character to feel rewarding. Blue and Silver's character highly influenced later rivals. Characters such as Bede and Carmine were both considered positively in comparison to Blue due to their return to the character archetype, with both receiving praise for their individual character arcs. The Isle of Armor's Klara and Avery were also highlighted due to their personalities and more intentionally negative attitudes, while also receiving positive reviews for the fact their attitudes served a role beyond the plot.

The transition into kinder rival characters was met with mixed responses. The overall positivity of characters such as Hau and Hop made many feel like their victories against them were not earned and potentially mean. In particular, Hop's subsequent character arc surrounding his constant losses was described as putting the player into a similar position to Blue in terms of their role, though it did receive some praise due to its apparent self-awareness of Hop's role as a "kind" rival. Hau's role was also cited similarly, due to the fact that the player's rivalry with Gladion was significantly stronger than with Hau, who was nothing but supportive of the player. Kieran, one of the rivals of Scarlet and Violet's DLC expansion, bore a similar character arc, which produced praise for evolving an initially kinder rival into one with a similar set of characteristics to those of Blue and Silver. Despite this, the shift to kinder rivals was highlighted positively due to the fact that it no longer used meaner antagonistic rivals to encourage the player, which was considered potentially harmful as a message to younger audiences.

The lack of difficulty also contributed to the "kinder" rivals being met with a less positive critical response, with the battles with Brendan and May in the Hoenn-based games and the rivals of Pokémon X and Y being highlighted as forgettable due to the lack of challenge, though Hop's battling inexperience was highlighted for its ability to aid in the development of his character throughout the plot of Sword and Shield. The lack of backstory and personality in other rivals was also deemed to make several rival characters less compelling than later rivals, such as Nemona from Scarlet and Violet. Nemona in particular was considered more compelling due to having a unique and interesting character that did not fall into similar character archetypes to previous rivals. Scarlet and Violet were highlighted for their unique departures from traditional rival formulas. Arven's storyline, for instance, was praised due to its strong emotional narrative and conclusion throughout the plot of the game, while Nemona's was considered a call for more unique rival characters in future installments that did not fall into the "mean" or "kind" archetypes of past games.
