= Go Ichinose =

Japanese composer

- 一之瀬 剛
- Occupation: Composer
- Years active: 1993–present
- Employer: Game Freak

Go Ichinose (一之瀬 剛, Ichinose Gō) is a Japanese composer who works for the video game development company Game Freak. He is best known for composing for the Pokémon series.

== Early life and education ==
When Ichinose was in kindergarten his parents forced him to attend a music class and a swimming school. He disliked the swimming classes, crying until he didn't have to attend anymore. He stayed in the music classes but was unable to advance to higher levels because he never did his homework. Ichinose switched to the piano and until junior high he refused to practice pieces that he didn't like. If he liked a piece he would practice it a lot even if it was difficult, Chopin's being his favorites to play. He started to get into video game music around this time and would record the music and then play them on the piano. Many of the tracks he played on his piano were songs from a record that was played to him as an unborn child.

== Career ==
In 1993 Ichinose started working for Game Freak part-time to study programming and get qualifications. His programming didn't have much progress as he was making music instead. He began making music for Pokémon Gold and Silver and has stayed on the sound team since. When looking for people to help make music at Game Freak, Ichinose and Junichi Masuda, who is the director of the Pokémon games as well as working as a composer for the games, approach people familiar with music and ask them to produce something.

=== Music production ===
The TV anime for Pokémon uses the tracks from the video games but expands on it with an orchestral arrangement. For the games the sound team has to work using their imaginations if the game is still being produced but if it is produced, they play through the game to get inspiration for the music. For the sounds of Pokémon, Game Freak bans the use of animal based sounds due to animals not existing in the Pokémon world. The sound department used a new specialized program during the development of Pokémon Scarlet and Violet, called PokeSynth, giving nuances to Pokémon cries. High tunes are more often used for the games as lower tunes didn't come out of the game speakers as well as high tunes did. Ichinose often gets ideas for the melody of songs when he is not in work and not under any work-related pressure. "Input music" is used in the music production for the games which leads to not favoring harmonic concepts and musical compositions. This makes the orchestral arrangement for the anime unable to be a 1:1 recreation of the music in the video games.

== Works ==
Year	Title	Role
1996	Bazaru de Gozaru no Game de Gozaru	Music
1997	Bushi Seiryūden: Futari no Yūsha	Game design
1999	Click Medic	Game design, music
1999	Pokémon Pinball	Music
1999	Pokémon Gold and Silver	Music with Junichi Masuda
2000	Pokémon Crystal	Music with Junichi Masuda and Morikazu Aoki
2002	Pokémon Ruby and Sapphire	Music with Junichi Masuda and Morikazu Aoki
2004	Pokémon FireRed and LeafGreen	Music with Morikazu Aoki
2004	Pokémon Emerald	Music with Junichi Masuda, Morikazu Aoki, and Hitomi Sato
2005	Drill Dozer	Music with Satoshi Nohara
2006	Pokémon Diamond and Pearl	Music with Hitomi Sato and Junichi Masuda
2008	Pokémon Platinum	Music with Hitomi Sato, Satoshi Nohara, and Junichi Masuda
2009	Pokémon HeartGold and SoulSilver	Music with Hitomi Satō, Junichi Masuda, Shota Kageyama and Takuto Kitsuta
2010	Pokémon Black and White	Music with Hitomi Satō, Jun'ichi Masuda, Minako Adachi and Shota Kageyama
2012	Pokémon Black 2 and White 2	Music with Hitomi Sato
2013	Pocket Card Jockey	Game design, music
2016	Pokémon Sun and Moon	Music with Hideaki Kuroda, Hitomi Satō, Junichi Masuda, Minako Adachi, and Tomaoki Oga
2017	Pokémon Ultra Sun and Ultra Moon	Music with Minako Adachi, Junichi Masuda, and Tomoaki Oga
2019	Little Town Hero	Sound manager
2019	Pokémon Sword and Shield	Music with Keita Okamoto, Minako Adachi and Toby Fox
2020	Pokémon Sword and Shield: The Isle of Armor	Music with Keita Okamoto, Minako Adachi and Hitomi Sato
2020	Pokémon Sword and Shield: The Crown Tundra	Music with Keita Okamoto, Minako Adachi, Hitomi Sato and Junichi Masuda
2022	Pokémon Legends: Arceus	Music with Hitomi Sato and Hiromitsu Maeba
2022	Pokémon Scarlet and Violet	Music with Hiromitsu Maeba, Hitomi Sato, Junichi Masuda, Minako Adachi, Teruo Taniguchi and Toby Fox
2023	Pocket Card Jockey: Ride On!	Game design, music
2023	Pokémon Scarlet and Violet: The Hidden Treasure of Area Zero	Music with Minako Adachi, Rei Murayama, Hitomi Sato, Hiromitsu Maeba, Haruka Soeda and Toby Fox
2023	Crystarise	Music
2025	Pokémon Legends Z-A	Sound team lead, “Racine Construction”
2026	Pokémon Pokopia	Sound supervisor
2026	Pokémon Champions	Sound supervisor
2026	Beast of Reincarnation	Music with Kow Otani, Cris Velasco, Mikiya Hayashi, Yasuaki Iwata
