= Pokémon Black 2 and White 2 =

2012 video games

Pokémon Black 2; Pokémon White 2
- North American box art for Pokémon Black 2 and Pokémon White 2, depicting the Black Kyurem and White Kyurem forms of legendary Pokémon Kyurem
- Developer: Game Freak
- Publishers: JP: The Pokémon Company; WW: Nintendo
- Director: Takao Unno
- Producers: Junichi Masuda; Hitoshi Yamagami; Shusaku Egami
- Designers: Teruyuki Shimoyamada; Suguru Nakatsui; Toshinobu Matsumiya
- Programmer: Akito Mori
- Artist: Takao Unno
- Writer: Toshinobu Matsumiya
- Composers: Go Ichinose; Hitomi Sato
- Series: Pokémon
- Platform: Nintendo DS
- Release: JP: 23 June 2012; NA: 7 October 2012; AU: 11 October 2012; EU: 12 October 2012
- Genre: Role-playing
- Modes: Single-player, multiplayer

Pokémon Black Version 2 (Note: Japanese: ポケットモンスターブラック2, Hepburn: Poketto Monsutā Burakku Tsū; "Pocket Monsters: Black 2") and Pokémon White Version 2 (Note: Japanese: ポケットモンスターホワイト2, Hepburn: Poketto Monsutā Howaito Tsū; "Pocket Monsters: White 2") are 2012 role-playing video games developed by Game Freak, published by The Pokémon Company and Nintendo for the Nintendo DS. Part of the fifth generation of the Pokémon video game series, the games are direct sequels to Pokémon Black and Pokémon White, being the first sequels in the series. They were first released in Japan in June 2012, with a worldwide release following in October 2012, as the last first-party games for the system. The games feature the legendary Pokémon identified by Junichi Masuda as Black Kyurem and White Kyurem. The games were first revealed on February 26, 2012, in the episode of the Japanese television program Pokémon Smash!, followed by an international confirmation on the Pokémon official website.

Black 2 and White 2 follow a new Pokémon Trainer's journey to become the Unova League Champion, two years after the events of Black and White. Following the events of its predecessors, the criminal organization Team Plasma have come back as Neo Team Plasma, and the player must thwart their plans throughout the story, stopping them from ruling the world. The games also include new features such as the Key System, Hidden Grottoes, new cities, and newly available Pokémon. Like other core series Pokémon games, players must trade between versions in order to complete the Pokédex.

A Pokémon Grey game was not released due to the title clashing with the theme of opposites found in Black and White, and to surprise players expecting the developers to follow the same naming pattern as previous titles. It received generally positive reviews from critics and was praised for its new features and changes over the original, but was criticized for its lack of innovation.

== Gameplay ==
Similar to previous entries, Pokémon Black 2 and White 2 consist of two major loops of gameplay, overworld exploration and battles. Overworld exploration consists of controlling the player character from a top-down perspective, talking to non-playable characters, and looking for items and Pokémon. Battles consist of the player sending out their Pokémon with the objective to lower the opponent's Pokémon to zero health points. The player achieves this with the use of their Pokémon's "moves" which can achieve different purposes like attacking, buffing, debuffing, or inflicting status effects.

Pokémon Black 2 and White 2 are set two years after the events of Black and White, and much of the beginning events take place in new locations on the western side of the Unova region. These new locations also feature several Pokémon that were previously unavailable in Black and White, featuring a total of 300 unique Pokémon available from the start of the game.

Black 2 and White 2 are also compatible with a new downloadable game for the Nintendo 3DS, Pokémon Dream Radar. Pokémon Dream Radar introduces the character Professor Burnet, as well as alternate forms for the Pokémon Tornadus, Thundurus, and Landorus, which can be transferred to Black 2 and White 2 after being captured in Dream Radar. Additionally, the Dream World makes a return from Pokémon Black and White, however, it was shut down on January 14, 2014, alongside all other services for fifth generation games. The mythical Pokémon Keldeo also received a new form in the game, known as the Resolute form.

=== New features ===
A new game mechanic introduced in Black 2 and White 2 is the "PokéStar Studios" side-game, where the player character participates in the filming of a movie involving Pokémon and other actors. A character named Brycen-Man also appears, as Brycen from the original games returned to his movie career. Another new mechanic is the Pokémon World Tournament, where the player battles powerful trainers from the previous games in the series, ranging from Gym Leaders Brock, Misty, Volkner, and Giovanni to Pokémon League Champions Cynthia, Steven, and Lance. Another new mechanic is the Key System, a feature that is unlocked after beating the game. With it, the player can unlock difficulties and new additional areas like Black Tower or White Tree within the same version. The player can also unlock chambers to capture Regirock, Registeel, and Regice.

== Plot ==
=== Setting ===
The events of Pokémon Black 2 and White 2 take place two years after the events of Black and White, with new locations that weren't accessible in the previous games. These are places like Virbank City, Flocessy Town, Lentimas Town, Humilau City, along with areas called Hidden Grottoes, where you can catch special Pokémon. Also, instead of starting in Nuvema Town, the player begins their journey in Aspertia City, a new city located in the southwest of Unova. Unova's design is modeled after New York City.

=== Story ===
The player and their rival begin their Pokémon journey in the previously unexplorable western side of Unova. They live in the new Aspertia City, and receive their starter Pokémon from Bianca, an NPC that served as one of the player's rivals in Black and White. The player also meets Cheren, the other rival character, who is now a Gym Leader in Aspertia City. Much like other Pokémon games, the player travels around the region, battling Gym Leaders to acquire eight Gym Badges, and then goes on to challenge the Elite Four and the Unova League Champion to beat the game.

The plot of Black 2 and White 2 features the primary antagonistic force Neo Team Plasma, whom the player first encounters while running an errand, and later when travelling to the first other major city where the team announces its plans to take over the world and steal others' Pokémon in front of the player, the rival, and new Gym Leader Roxie. (Note: Homika (ホミカ) in Japan) At the behest of Iris, the player helps Burgh track down more Neo Team Plasma members in the sewers of Castelia City, where the player meets Colress (Note: Achroma (アクロマ, Akuroma) in Japan) for the first time, who claims to be a researcher of the strengths of Pokémon.

Later, it is revealed that Neo Team Plasma has stolen a Purrloin the player's rival was planning on giving to his sister, which makes the rival angry towards the organization, including its reformed former members. After learning about the Legendary Pokémon Kyurem, which arrived at the Giant Chasm years ago, the player discovers that Neo Team Plasma is working to use Kyurem to take over the world, harnessing its power to freeze large portions of Unova, including Opelucid City. The player tracks Neo Team Plasma to Humilau City, home of the final new Pokémon Gym led by Marlon, (Note: Shizui (シズイ) in Japan) who helps the player battle Neo Team Plasma to remove Kyurem from their grasp. He also helps the rival retrieve his Purrloin, which has since evolved into a Liepard that is used in battle against the player and rival.

The battle reaches its climax in the Giant Chasm, where the player discovers Colress is working with Neo Team Plasma to learn more about the capabilities of Pokémon, and that Ghetsis is planning to use Kyurem, the "empty" Pokémon that is left over from when Zekrom and Reshiram split apart hundreds of years ago, by filling it with his ambition to rule the world. After battling the Shadow Triad with help from the player's rival, who receives his Liepard back, the player enters the inner sanctum of the Giant Chasm where they find Kyurem and Ghetsis. N appears with either his Zekrom in Black 2 or Reshiram in White 2 to try to talk sense into his father Ghetsis, but N's legendary Pokémon is defeated by and fused with Kyurem, transforming it into Black Kyurem in Black 2 or White Kyurem in White 2, and forcing the player to battle it. After defeating Kyurem, it separates from N's Pokémon and the player faces Ghetsis, who is stunned that he has been defeated again. N tries to talk sense into him, but Ghetsis leaves, and N thanks the player for his assistance in defeating Neo Team Plasma once and for all. After defeating Neo Team Plasma, the player is finally able to battle the Elite Four and the Unova League Champion, Iris, and complete the main story.

After the game's main story is completed, the player is able to challenge N who has taken up residence in his former castle, where upon the defeat of his Legendary Pokémon, it turns into the object that once held its essence and N gives it to the player. The player can then bring the item to another part of Unova where it transforms back into the Pokémon and the player can then capture it. Also, after completion of the game, the player can battle former Unova League Champion Alder, Sinnoh League Champion Cynthia, the former Striaton City Gym Leaders, and take on the Black Tower or White Treehollow challenges in Black City or White Forest, respectively. Through use of a unique game feature called "Memory Link", the player can access new content and side quests dependent on the original Black and White games, such as references to the player's name in the previous game, flashback sequences, the ability to capture Pokémon that once belonged to N, battling Cheren and Bianca who reminisce about the protagonist of the previous game, and participating in the Pokémon World Tournament.

== Development ==
During development, the theme Takao Unno raised for Black and White 2 was resonance, which led the staff to bringing up the idea for 100 people to be able to play together through the Entralink. For smoother gameplay for new and returning players, a Pokémon Center was added to the first city of the region, a first for Pokémon games at that time, for an expedited introduction to the world. Takao Unno wanted Black and White players to look at Unova in Black and White 2 from a different perspective, and executive director Junichi Masuda hoped that starting in a new city would make the gameworld look new to returning players. He also explains that he tries to play the games from the perspective of a newcomer, and to make them easily understandable for players new to the series.

=== Promotion ===
Pokémon Black 2 and White 2 were released alongside the premiere of Pokémon the Movie: Kyurem vs. The Sword of Justice, and certain theaters in Japan allowed players to receive an in-game Pokémon in Black and White or Black and White 2 when watching the movie.

=== Music ===
Pokémon Black 2 and White 2 background music contains the music of Pokémon Black and White, adds brand new tracks, and utilizes the arrangements of most tracks from Pokémon Black and White. The official soundtrack of the game titled Nintendo DS Pokémon Black 2 · White 2 Super Music Complete (Note: Japanese: ニンテンドーDS ポケモンブラック２・ホワイト２ スーパーミュージックコンプリート, Hepburn: Nintendō Dī Esu Poketto Monsutā Burakku Tsū · Howaito Tsū Sūpā Myūjikku Konpurīto) was released in Japan on July 25, 2012. Its DISC 4 also includes music from Pokémon Black and White, Pokémon Emerald, and Pokémon Platinum, which had not seen an original soundtrack release prior.

== Reception ==
Reception

Aggregate score
| Aggregator | Score |
|---|---|
| Metacritic | 80/100 |

Review scores
| Publication | Score |
|---|---|
| Destructoid | 7.5/10 |
| Eurogamer | 90/100 (Black 2) |
| Famitsu | 36/40 |
| Game Informer | 7.5/10 |
| GameSpot | 6.5/10 (Black 2) |
| GamesRadar+ | 4/5 |
| IGN | 9.6/10 (Black 2) |
| Nintendo Life | 9/10 |

The games received "generally favorable reviews" from critics and holds an aggregate score of 80 according to Metacritic. Famitsu magazine awarded Black 2 and White 2 a point total of 36/40, slightly lower than their perfectly scoring predecessors. The games received a 9.6/10 from IGN's Audrey Drake, praising the overall changes from the original games. Game Informer's Kyle Hilliard also praised the new features, saying they "work well with the Pokémon formula," but was disappointed by “lack of innovation”. Nintendo Life gave the games a 9/10, calling the games “the best in the series to date” and “fresh and easy to play”. GamesRadar+ gave the games a 4/5, saying that they relied too heavily on Black and White, but also praised the storyline extension and the new accessible areas in the game.

Within the first two days of release, Pokémon Black 2 and White 2 sold over 1.6 million copies, and over 2 million copies within the first two weeks.As of January 2013, Pokémon Black 2 and White 2 had combined sales of 7.81 million copies worldwide. By 2020, Pokémon Black 2 and White 2 had sold 8.52 million copies worldwide.
