= Pokémon: Twilight Wings =

Japanese original net animation series

薄明の翼 (Hakumei no Tsubasa)
- Original net animation
- Directed by: Shingo Yamashita
- Written by: Taku Kishimoto (Note: Screenplay Supervisor (脚本監修)); Sō Kinoshita (#1–7); Yō Watanabe (#8)
- Music by: Conisch
- Studio: Studio Colorido (#1, 3–8); Filmony (#2)
- Released: January 15, 2020 – November 5, 2020
- Runtime: 5–9 minutes
- Episodes: 8

Pokémon: Twilight Wings (薄明の翼, Hakumei no Tsubasa) is a Japanese original net animation (ONA) anime series produced by Studio Colorido and released on YouTube by The Pokémon Company. It is a series inspired by the Pokémon Sword and Shield titles of the Pokémon video games, but it is not a part of the television series. A total of eight episodes, were announced for the series on December 12, 2019. The first episode was released on January 15, 2020, and further episodes were planned to be released on a monthly basis, however the fifth episode was delayed from May to June due to the COVID-19 pandemic. This series, for the first seven episodes, also serves as a prequel to the Sword and Shield titles.

The series initially concluded on August 6, 2020, when the seventh episode was released. However, a special episode titled "The Gathering of Stars" (EXPANSION ～星の祭～), based on downloadable content for the Pokémon Sword and Shield games, The Isle of Armor and The Crown Tundra, premiered on November 5, 2020, in Japanese, and later on November 17, 2020, in English.

== Episode list ==
No.	Title	Original release date	English air date	Ref.
1	"Letter"; Transliteration: "Tegami" (Japanese: 手紙)	January 15, 2020	January 15, 2020	
John, a hospital-ridden boy in the Galar region and a fan of the Pokémon Champion Leon, writes and delivers a letter to Chairman Rose, who runs Galar's Pokémon League.
2	"Training"; Transliteration: "Shugyou" (Japanese: 修行)	February 18, 2020	February 18, 2020	
The episode follows Pokémon Gym Leader Bea in her training preparing for a future rematch against Champion Leon.
3	"Buddy"; Transliteration: "Aibou" (Japanese: 相棒)	March 17, 2020	March 17, 2020	
Hop's admiration for his big brother Leon and his Charizard leaves his Wooloo feeling unimportant. Wooloo runs off and Hop sets out to find his friend.
4	"Early-Evening Waves"; Transliteration: "Younami" (Japanese: 夕波)	April 17, 2020	April 21, 2020	
Gym Leader Nessa who specializes with Water-type Pokémon reflects on her accomplishments after losing a match against Gym Leader Milo.
5	"Assistant"; Transliteration: "Hisho" (Japanese: 秘書)	June 5, 2020	June 4, 2020	
A day in the work life of Macro Cosmos's Vice President Oleana, assistant and secretary to Chairman Rose who keeps the company running in the Chairman's absence.
6	"Moonlight"; Transliteration: "Tsukiyo" (Japanese: 月夜)	July 3, 2020	July 2, 2020	
After getting into an argument with his friend John, Tommy wants to make amends. He enlists Allister, Galar’s Ghost-type Gym Leader, to help in a most unusual way.
7	"Sky"; Transliteration: "Sora" (Japanese: 空)	August 6, 2020	August 6, 2020	
The day of Leon’s Championship match has arrived, and thanks to John’s letter, all the kids at the hospital are invited to attend! But in his excitement, John oversleeps and almost misses his chance to go to the stadium.
8	"The Gathering of Stars"; Transliteration: "Hoshi no Matsuri" (Japanese: 星の祭)	November 5, 2020	November 17, 2020	
Having lost his title as Pokémon Champion, Leon visits his old master for advice. He then proceeds to participate in the most exciting Pokémon battle tournament yet.

== Characters and voice cast ==
Character	English	Japanese
John	Julia McIlvaine	Aoi Yūki
Oleana	Julia McIlvaine	Ayumi Nagao
Chairman Rose	Keith Silverstein	Kazuhiro Yamaji
Tommy	Morgan Berry	Kei Shindō
Bea	Laura Stahl	Eri Kitamura
Hop	Griffin Puatu	Yūko Sanpei
Milo	Zach Aguilar	Tarusuke Shingaki
Leon	Kai Jordan	Takahiro Sakurai
Sonia	Allegra Clark	Lynn
Nessa	Anairis Quinones	Sora Amamiya
Allister	Casey Mongillo	Ryō Hirohashi
Raihan	Nazeeh Tarsha	Kohsuke Toriumi
Cabbie	Edward Bosco	Seiro Ogino
Mustard	SungWon Cho	
Nurse		Yuna Ogata
Corviknight		Kiyotaka Furushima
Charizard	Edward Bosco	Kiyotaka Furushima
Machop	Laura Post	Kiyotaka Furushima
Machoke		Tsuguo Mogami
Machamp		Masaaki Ihara
Wooloo/Dubwool	Erica Mendez	Rikako Aikawa
Yamper	Laura Post	Rikako Aikawa
Advertising staff	Allegra Clark	Miyari Nemoto
Gastly	Kai Jordan	Kiyotaka Furushima
Haunter	Casey Mongillo	Kiyotaka Furushima
Gengar		Kiyotaka Furushima
Opal	Laura Post	
Melony	Laura Post	
Piers	Edward Bosco	Kisho Taniyama
Goodra	Allegra Clark	
Wingull	Dawn M. Bennett	
Avery	Christopher Hackney	
Klara	Erica Mendez	Yui Ishikawa
Amoonguss	Amber Lee Connors	
Krookodile	Amber Lee Connors	
Lycanroc	Christopher Hackney	
Honey	Amber Lee Connors	
Bede	Brandon Winckler	
Marnie	Dawn M. Bennett	Yui Ishikawa
Morpeko	Allegra Clark	
Grimmsnarl	Christopher Hackney	
Peonia	Heather Gonzalez	
Peony	Nazeeh Tarsha	
Arctozolt	Dawn M. Bennett	

== Criticism ==
Certain species of Pokémon that were initially cut from appearing in the Sword and Shield games (such as Dewgong) appeared in the fourth episode of the animated series, resulting in various fans feeling misled. In response, The Pokémon Company issued a public apology.
