= Pokémon Platinum =

2008 video game

- North American box art for Pokémon Platinum, depicting the legendary Pokémon Giratina in its Origin Forme
- Developer: Game Freak
- Publishers: JP: The Pokémon Company; WW: Nintendo
- Director: Takeshi Kawachimaru
- Producers: Junichi Masuda; Shusaku Egami; Hitoshi Yamagami; Hiroaki Tsuru
- Artist: Ken Sugimori
- Writers: Toshinobu Matsumiya; Hitomi Sato; Suguru Nakatsui; Akihito Tomisawa
- Composers: Hitomi Sato; Satoshi Nohara; Junichi Masuda; Go Ichinose
- Series: Pokémon
- Platform: Nintendo DS
- Release: JP: September 13, 2008; NA: March 22, 2009; AU: May 14, 2009; EU: May 22, 2009
- Genre: Role-playing
- Modes: Single-player, multiplayer

Pokémon Platinum Version (Note: Japanese: ポケットモンスタープラチナ, Hepburn: Poketto Monsutā Purachina) is a 2008 role-playing video game developed by Game Freak and published by The Pokémon Company and Nintendo for the Nintendo DS. The game is an enhanced version of the 2006 titles Pokémon Diamond and Pearl and is part of the fourth generation of the Pokémon video game series. It was released in Japan in September 2008 and internationally throughout 2009.

In Pokémon Platinum, players control either Lucas or Dawn and begin with one of three Pokémon provided by Professor Rowan. The mascot Pokémon is Giratina, which plays a central role in the story. While Giratina had only one form in Diamond and Pearl, it gains a new "Origin Form" in Platinum, introduced alongside the Distortion World, a new area featuring altered physics compared with the Sinnoh region where the game takes place. Gameplay follows traditional Pokémon mechanics: players explore towns, caves, and outdoor environments, capture and train Pokémon, and engage in turn-based battles.

Pokémon Platinum received generally positive reviews, holding aggregate scores of 84 on Metacritic and 83.14% on GameRankings. Critics praised it as one of the stronger entries in the series and noted the additions and refinements made over Diamond and Pearl, while some criticized it for being too similar to those games. Publications such as IGN, Nintendo Power, and GamePro highlighted its improvements; IGN ranked it ninth on its list of the best Nintendo DS games and nominated it as one of the best DS role-playing games of 2009. It was the fastest-selling video game in Japan at the time of its release and had sold 7.06 million copies worldwide by March 31, 2010.

== Gameplay ==
A battle in Pokémon Platinum; players may have either one-on-one battles or two-on-two.

Pokémon Platinum is a role-playing video game with adventure elements. Its basic mechanics are the same as those found in Pokémon Diamond and Pearl, with the exception of a few bugs and glitches. For example, the void glitch was patched out because many people lost their save files. As with all Pokémon games for handheld consoles up to that point, the gameplay is in third-person overhead perspective, and consists of three basic screens: a field map, in which the player navigates the main character; a battle screen; and the menu, in which the player configures their party, items, or gameplay settings. Players begin the game with one Pokémon and can capture more using Poké Balls. The player can also use his or her Pokémon to battle other Pokémon. When the player encounters a wild Pokémon or is challenged by a trainer to a battle, the screen switches to a turn-based battle screen where the Pokémon battle. During a battle, the player may use a move, use an item, switch the active Pokémon, or flee. Fleeing is not an option during battles against trainers. All Pokémon have hit points (HP); when a Pokémon's HP is reduced to zero, it faints and cannot battle unless revived with a Pokémon skill or an item. A reviewer from Games for Lunch noted that, while Platinum retained much of the core gameplay from Diamond and Pearl, refinements like quicker menu response times and improved AI made the experience feel noticeably smoother for returning players.

If the player's Pokémon defeats the opposing Pokémon by causing it to faint, it receives experience points. After accumulating enough experience points, it will level up; most Pokémon evolve into a new species of Pokémon when they reach a certain level. Apart from battling, capturing Pokémon is the most important element of Pokémon gameplay. Although other trainers' Pokémon cannot be captured, the player may use Poké Balls on a wild Pokémon during battle. A successful capture adds the Pokémon to the player's active party or stores it in the PC if the player already has the maximum of six Pokémon. Factors in the success rate of capture include the HP of the target Pokémon and the strength of the Poké Ball used; the lower the target's HP and the stronger the Poké Ball, the higher the success rate of capture is. Platinum features largely the same Pokémon as in Diamond and Pearl, with some added and some missing. Platinum features the Pokétch, a wristwatch-like device, introduced in Diamond and Pearl. It features simple applications such as a calculator, map, counter, and drawing pad. Platinum also features the Underground mode, where players can dig for spheres and Fossils.

=== New features ===
Platinum adds an area called the "Wi-Fi Plaza", which features several Pokémon species-themed mini-games and allows up to 20 players to be present in it. Platinum also introduces the Vs. Recorder, which allows players to record battles held in the Battle Frontier or on Wi-Fi. The Global Trade System (GTS), a service that allows players to trade anonymously over a Wi-Fi connection, returns in Platinum; one change to the GTS system allows players to be notified via email when a trade has commenced, though, outside Japan, this feature has been reduced to being merely a message on the player's Wii. To access all of these Wi-Fi-related features, you will need to have a network with a WEP key security. A variety of changes have been made to the appearance and availability of Pokémon; Giratina, Shaymin, and Rotom all have new forms, with Rotom having four new forms. New items are also introduced to facilitate Pokémon form changes. Giratina and Shaymin's new forms can be achieved using the Griseous Orb and Gracidea Flower respectively. The trios of Articuno, Zapdos, and Moltres, along with Regice, Regirock, and Registeel, have been added to the game as well. The game also adds the Battle Frontier, a feature first introduced in Pokémon Emerald. Platinum's Pokémon Contests play similarly to Diamond and Pearl's; they feature four stages, awarding ribbons to Pokémon for having the best result. Baked goods called Poffins can be made from berries and fed to Pokémon to improve certain traits, depending on the kind of Poffin made. In addition to compatibility with Diamond and Pearl, Platinum is also compatible with the third generation Pokémon role-playing games available on the Game Boy Advance through the DS's Game Boy Advance slot. Players can also upload Pokémon from Platinum to the Wii games Pokémon Battle Revolution and My Pokémon Ranch, though the latter is only compatible with Platinum in Japan. Two new characters, Looker, a police investigator on the trail of Team Galactic, and Charon, a Team Galactic admin, are introduced. A significant addition is the Distortion World, which features distorted physics versus those in the standard world. Compared to Diamond and Pearl, many popular Pokémon become accessible much earlier in the game as well, such as Togekiss, Gliscor, and Electivire. Pokémon Platinum also adds new elements to the post-game, including the player being given a Villa to decorate.

== Setting and story ==
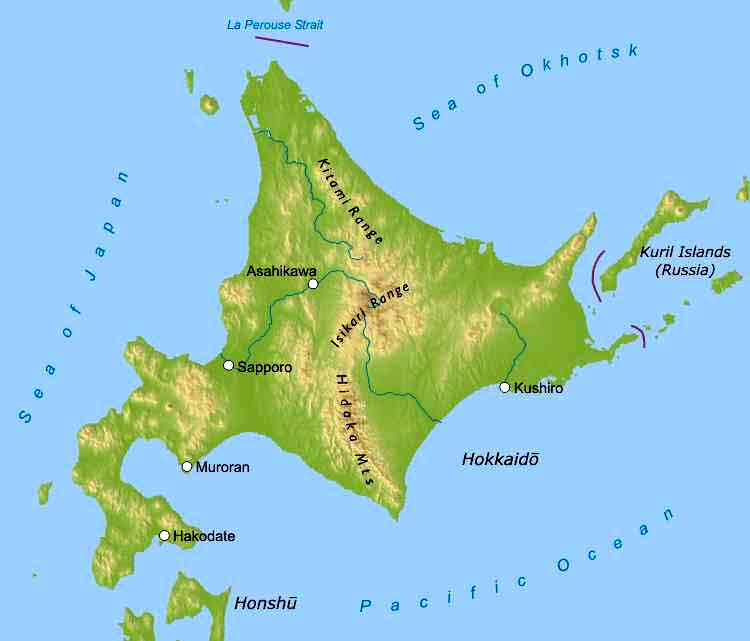
The Sinnoh Region is based on the Japanese island of Hokkaidō.

Similar to Diamond and Pearl, Platinum is set in the fictional region of Sinnoh. Platinum features slightly different environments, there is snow on the ground in locations where it was not found in Diamond and Pearl, to reflect this change the player characters and the player's rival are dressed for colder weather when compared with their designs from Diamond and Pearl.

Like its predecessors, Diamond and Pearl, players of Platinum revisit familiar locations from the Sinnoh Region, including Twinleaf Town, Pastoria City, and the Resort Area. However, many of these locations have experienced design improvements and changes from Diamond and Pearl. Similarly, Platinum also features the return of several popular characters from Diamond and Pearl, including Sinnoh League Champion Cynthia, Elite Four members, Aaron, Bertha, Flint, and Lucian, and Gym Leaders, Roark, Gardenia, Fantina, Maylene, Crasher Wake, Byron, Candice, and Volkner.

Pokémon Platinum, while keeping to the same plot as Diamond and Pearl for the most part, introduces several new elements to it. Two new characters are introduced - the first being Charon, a scientist in Team Galactic as well as the fourth and newest commander alongside Mars, Jupiter, and Saturn, and the other being a detective investigating Team Galactic under the codename "Looker". Giratina is also the focus of the plot, whereas Dialga and Palkia were the focuses of Diamond and Pearl, respectively. However, the player can still obtain both Dialga and Palkia once completing the game, whereas, in Diamond and Pearl, the player could only catch Giratina and the respective game's mascot. The player has multiple chances to catch Giratina during the game, with this being the first instance of the game giving the player the chance to catch a Legendary Pokémon again after defeating it.

New scenes were added into Platinum's plot in order to advance the story and give it more depth. One of these scenes includes the player character sneaking into Team Galactic's headquarters alongside Looker and witnessing a speech performed by Team Galactic's boss, Cyrus. In this speech, Cyrus depicts his plan to use the Legendary Pokémon Dialga and Palkia to create a new world without spirit.

As in Diamond and Pearl, the Starter Pokémon are the Grass-type Turtwig, the Fire-type Chimchar, and the Water-type Piplup, which evolve into Torterra, Infernape, and Empoleon respectively.

== Development ==
The Distortion World took inspiration from concepts such as antimatter and the mass-energy equivalence.

When trying to determine what content to change from Diamond and Pearl, game designer Takeshi Kawachimaru felt that the designers should focus on changing only the most important things to make sure that it was not too different from the original games. Game director Junichi Masuda commented that since they designed the original two games as the "ultimate" Pokémon titles, they had to make Platinum even stronger than them.

Giratina's design change was one of the first things revealed about Platinum in February 2008. In designing the new form, they paid attention to the details; the designer redrew Giratina several times, attempting to make it look different from its form in Diamond and Pearl. They finalized its design as an "antimatter Pokémon". Masuda explained antimatter as well as the mass-energy equivalence to the developers. He also explained the "Reversed Mount Fuji", which is what they call the reflection of Mount Fuji. While Kawachimaru did not understand it at first, he later incorporated them into the game. The Distortion World was based on these ideas, described as the "core concept" of the game. They also added the Wi-Fi Plaza and Battle Frontier modes to improve players' ability to share information with other players. An idea that the developers wanted to include was to allow players to communicate with family and friends more easily; the developers felt that the Battle Frontier realized this idea.

The developers chose to call the game Platinum because of their observations that diamond has a "meaning of love", while pearl has a "meaning of happiness". They explained that they wanted to choose something that seems "beautiful", describing platinum as "different from a diamond, different from a gem, different from a pearl, different from something that nature creates, something [that] shines, something beautiful." They also created the story to be different from Diamond and Pearl, commenting that they wanted to make Giratina seem "more fun, more interesting, cooler." They added Giratina's new area to make the story "more appealing". While Diamond and Pearl had Gym Leaders who sometimes had Pokémon not in keeping with the type they focus on, Platinum changes this by expanding the Sinnoh Pokédex so that all Pokémon belonging to Gym Leaders were the appropriate type, as well as giving players earlier access to several new evolutions of older Pokémon, many of which were originally only obtainable after beating the Champion.

== Release ==
Pokémon Platinum was first announced on May 15, 2008, as a follow-up to Diamond and Pearl. It was initially announced for an August 2008 release in Japan, with no worldwide release date confirmed at that time. It was eventually released on September 13, 2008, in Japan, March 22, 2009, in North America, May 15, 2009, in Australia, and May 22, 2009, in Europe. Its North American release was celebrated at the Nintendo World Store in New York City.

As a bonus for those who pre-ordered Pokémon Platinum, Nintendo gave away Giratina figurines in the United States. Expanded space was given to Pokémon merchandise in Toys "R" Us for Pokémon Platinum, which included a Pokémon Trading Card Game card set based on the Platinum name. They also arranged for several events to obtain rare Pokémon.

== Reception ==
=== Pre-release ===
GamePro's McKinley Noble commented that he anticipated the English release of Platinum. 1UP.com commented that fans will not be left "wanting", stating "once you venture back down the Pokémon rabbit hole, you won't be coming up again for a while." Craig Harris of IGN commented that those looking for something particularly new in Platinum such as a new method of control would be disappointed, adding that the controls felt "clumsy". However, he noted that those who played Diamond and Pearl will enjoy it for its new features and available Pokémon. In another preview, Harris commented that those who have played Diamond or Pearl will have to decide whether the new features are worth buying the game for, while those who have not should buy it if interested in playing a Pokémon game. Media scholar Seth Giddings cited Pokémon Platinum as an example of how children integrate virtual game worlds into everyday imaginative play, particularly highlighting its open-ended structure and role in shaping digital media habits. Later entries in the franchise, such as Pokémon Black, further developed gameplay elements refined in Platinum, including dynamic battle sequences and narrative pacing.

=== Critical response ===
Reception

Aggregate scores
Aggregator	Score
GameRankings	83.14%
Metacritic	84%

Review scores
Publication	Score
1Up.com	B+
Eurogamer	7/10
Famitsu	36/40
Game Informer	8.5/10
GameSpot	8/10
GameZone	7.8/10
IGN	8.8/10
Nintendo Power	9/10

Pokémon Platinum has received generally positive reception. It holds an aggregate score of 84/100 and 83.14% at Metacritic and GameRankings, respectively. It is the 56th highest rated Nintendo DS game on Game Rankings. The Anglo-Celt called it a solid, fun game for those who have yet to play Diamond and Pearl. GamePro's McKinley Noble called it a great game, calling other third versions of mainline Pokémon titles "lightweight" in comparison. Famitsu gave praise to Pokémon Platinum. One of the reviewers commented that players are "getting a lot for their money", while another reviewer commented that those who played Diamond and Pearl would not find it to be "more of the same." Another reviewer praised not only the features but also the improved gameplay. The fourth reviewer found fault in it being "Diamond and Pearl at the core", and as a result, "filling up your Pokédex from zero is rough." Official Nintendo Magazine's Chris Scullion called it the "ultimate Pokémon game", though noted that this was because it was an updated version of Diamond and Pearl. Nintendo Power called it "everything a Pokemon [sic] experience should be, and more."

Nintendo World Report's Zachary Miller commented that players who were burnt out on Diamond and Pearl would not find much incentive to play Platinum, but otherwise, said that Platinum is the "best Pokémon game ever made". Zippy of Hardcore Gamer cited its main quest, battle system, and multiplayer options for why "it is the best hand held RPG available right now". Games(TM) commented that the depth of Platinum's gameplay was deeper than "most hardcore MMO can boast". Toastfarmer of PALGN called it a "crown jewel" of the Nintendo DS, saying it was a "deep, engrossing and virtually endless game". GameDaily's Robert Workman commented that while the graphics and gameplay could have been changed more than they were, it "will score with hardcore fanatic and newbies alike." RPGamer's Adriaan den Ouden commented that while it was similar to Diamond and Pearl, the expanded Pokédex makes it "far more enjoyable." GameZone's jkdmedia commented that while Diamond and Pearl were great, Platinum was merely good. He added that it was a "must-own" to those who have not played Diamond or Pearl, but not for anyone else.

Dan Pearson of Eurogamer commented that those looking for a traditional role-playing game for the Nintendo DS should buy something like Chrono Trigger, Dragon Quest IV or V, or the Final Fantasy remakes, though he noted that those looking for a Pokémon title should get Platinum. Eurogamer Portugal's Ricardo Madeira called it the "more complete and distinct Pokémon third version he has seen to date." IGN's Craig Harris commented that while the improvements over Diamond and Pearl were not huge, its adventure mode and online mode were more fleshed out and expanded. They also included it in their list of Nintendo DS games of the spring season, commenting that it improved on Diamond and Pearl's gameplay formula, and went "above and beyond with new areas, characters, and, of course, Pokemon [sic]". In their "Cheers & Tears: DS RPGs" article, which details role-playing games of both high and low quality, IGN included Platinum as a game of high quality. They called it "packed to overflowing with content", commenting that even those who have played Diamond and Pearl several times could enjoy it. IGN ultimately named Platinum, along with Diamond and Pearl, as the ninth-best Nintendo DS game. IGN nominated it for best role-playing game for the Nintendo DS, while its readers chose it as the best multi-player game for the Nintendo DS.

Games Master UK called it "one of the most rewarding and substantial RPGs around", while NGamer UK's Rich Stanton called it "one of the finest strategy games ever made." RPG Fan's John Tucker commented that players of Diamond and Pearl would only be interested in its expanded online mode. Game Informer commented that if one was looking for a role-playing game and had not played Diamond or Pearl, it is "absolutely the way to go". 1UP.com's Justin Haywald called it the best Pokémon game, though noted that it was not very different from Diamond and Pearl. GameTrailers commented that fans of the series and those who appreciate role-playing games would enjoy it, but blamed games like Platinum for being the reason why some have lost interest in the series. GameSpot's Shiva Stella commented that while not fresh, it was the best "special edition yet". Game Revolution's Joe Dodson commented that while it was not "breathtaking", it was one of the "biggest and deepest phenomenons in gaming". CESA gave Platinum one of nine awards for excellence.

=== Sales ===
Pokémon Platinum's launch was credited for the increased sales of the Nintendo DS in Japan in September 2008. It sold more than one million copies in Japan in around three days, making it the fastest-selling game in the region at that time. It sold 315,000 copies in its second week, totaling 1.3 million copies in nine days. Pokémon Platinum ranked second in another week, selling 195,000 copies; it ranked first and sold 122,000 the week after. As of October 23, Pokémon Platinum was the second best-selling game for the respective week with sales exceeding 72,000 copies. Its current sales at that time were 1.75 million. It re-entered the top 10 list in early December due to a lack of new releases. As of December 31, 2008, Pokémon Platinum had sold 2.12 million copies in Japan. It was the fifth best-selling Nintendo DS game for the week of February 12, 2009. For the week ending July 9, 2009, it was the second best-selling Nintendo DS game. For the week ending July 23, 2009, it was the fifth best-selling Nintendo DS game. It fell from the top 10 list in July 2009.

In North America for March 2009, Pokémon Platinum ranked second on the top 10 best-selling video games chart, selling more than 805,000 copies from March 22, to April 4. For the week ending March 26, it was the second best-selling Nintendo DS game. For the week ending April 9, it was the best-selling Nintendo DS game. It ranked second place in both April and May 2009. It was the fourth best-selling Nintendo DS game for the week ending June 11, 2009. For the week ending July 9, 2009, it was the fifth best-selling Nintendo DS game. For the week ending July 23, 2009, it was the third best-selling Nintendo DS game. MarketWatch noted it as a strong seller for July 2009, a month considered to have been in a slump sales-wise. Pokémon Platinum was the 10th best-selling video game of 2009, selling more than 2 million copies.

In the United Kingdom, Pokémon Platinum was the second best-selling Nintendo DS game for the week ending June 11, 2009. For the week ending June 20, 2009, Pokémon Platinum fell off of the United Kingdom's top 10 best-selling video games chart. For the week ending July 9, 2009, it was the second best-selling Nintendo DS game. For the week ending July 23, 2009, it was the fourth best-selling Nintendo DS game.

Pokémon Platinum was the fourth best-selling game worldwide in the third quarter of 2008, selling approximately 1,482,000 copies. In the third quarter of 2009, Pokémon Platinum sold more than 2 million copies. In North America and PAL regions, Pokémon Platinum had sold a combined 3.75 million copies as of May 7, 2009. As of August 14, 2009, Pokémon Platinum had sold over 5.66 million copies worldwide. By October 30, 2009, Pokémon Platinum had sold 6.39 million copies worldwide. As of March 31, 2010, the game's worldwide sales reached 7.06 million. By 2023, the game reached 7.60 sales worldwide.
