= Pokémon Sword and Shield Expansion Pass =

2020 expansion pack for Pokémon Sword and Shield

- Cover art for the two DLC expansion packs, The Isle of Armor (left) and The Crown Tundra (right)
- Developer: Game Freak
- Publishers: JP: The Pokémon Company; WW: Nintendo
- Director: Hiroyuki Tani
- Producers: Hitoshi Yamagami; Takanori Sowa
- Artists: James Turner; Suguru Nakatsui
- Writer: Toshinobu Matsumiya
- Composers: Junichi Masuda; Minako Adachi; Go Ichinose; Keita Okamoto; Hitomi Sato
- Series: Pokémon
- Platform: Nintendo Switch
- Release: WW: June 17, 2020; (The Isle of Armor): WW: October 23, 2020; (The Crown Tundra)
- Genre: Role-playing
- Mode: Single-player

Pokémon Sword and Shield: The Isle of Armor (Note: Japanese: ポケットモンスター ソード・シールド 鎧の孤島, Hepburn: Poketto Monsutā Sōdo Shīrudo: Yoroi no Kotō) and Pokémon Sword and Shield: The Crown Tundra (Note: Japanese: ポケットモンスター ソード・シールド 冠の雪原, Hepburn: Poketto Monsutā Sōdo Shīrudo: Kanmuri no Setsugen) are the two downloadable content (DLC) expansion packs that make up the Pokémon Sword and Shield Expansion Pass (Note: Japanese: ポケットモンスター ソード・シールド エキスパンションパス, Hepburn: Poketto Monsutā Sōdo Shīrudo Ekisupanshon Pasu) on Nintendo Switch. They were developed by Game Freak and published by The Pokémon Company and Nintendo. The Isle of Armor was released worldwide on June 17, 2020, followed by the release of The Crown Tundra, which was released on October 23, 2020. The Pokémon Sword and Shield Expansion Pass physical bundle pack was released on November 6, 2020.

The addition of the Expansion Pass was used to replace the need for a third version or sequel of Sword and Shield, as well as to expand on concepts that were unable to be used in the base game. The two DLCs are set outside of the mainland of the Galar region, the game's main location. The Isle of Armor is set on a coastal island named the Isle of Armor, which is based on the Isle of Man. The Crown Tundra is set in the snowy southern area called the Crown Tundra, which is based on Scotland. The player controls the protagonist during their journey through these areas, where they encounter various new characters and Legendary Pokémon. Both Expansion Packs take place in a free-roaming open world, and introduce numerous new game mechanics not present in the base game.

== Gameplay ==
In The Isle of Armor, the player can train their Kubfu partner Pokémon into one of two forms of Urshifu depending on their training method.

In the Dynamax Adventure mode, teams of four players work together to defeat three Max Raid Battles in a row before facing a final opponent.

Pokémon Sword and Shield are RPGs with adventure elements. They are presented in a fixed camera, third-person perspective, though some areas allow for free camera movement. The player controls a young Pokémon trainer who goes on a quest to catch and train creatures known as Pokémon and win battles against other Pokémon trainers. By defeating opposing Pokémon in turn-based battles, the player's Pokémon gains experience, allowing them to level up and increase their battle statistics, learn new moves, and evolve into more powerful Pokémon. The player can capture wild Pokémon through wild encounters by weakening them in battle and catching them with Poké Balls, adding them to their party. The player can also battle and trade Pokémon with other players via the Switch's connectivity features. As is with other Pokémon games, certain Pokémon are only obtainable in either Sword or Shield, and the player will have to trade with others to obtain every Pokémon from both versions. Both expansion packs add Pokémon to the game that had previously been cut from the main game, with more than 200 Pokémon being brought back from prior games in the series.

The Isle of Armor, the first expansion pack, is set in one inter-connected "Wild Area", a free-roaming open world with a free moving camera and dynamic weather, which has implications on which Pokémon species appear at a given time. Additionally, "Raid Dens" appear throughout the island in vast quantities, which allow players to participate in raids against significantly larger "Dynamaxed" and "Gigantamaxed" Pokémon. The DLC introduces trials, initiated by the island's dojo master and former Galar Champion, Mustard, which must be completed to advance the story. The trials involve battling Pokémon and collecting items for "Max Soup", used for "Gigantamaxing" the player's Pokémon. These trials grant the players access to Kubfu, a Pokémon that can be trained to be evolved into one of two forms of the Pokémon Urshifu. There is also the "Cram-o-Matic", a machine that resembles the Pokémon Cramorant. This machine combines items into creating new, and sometimes rare, items. A returning feature from past games is the ability for the player's Pokémon to follow them in the DLC's overworld, which is not present in the base game. A new form of battling was introduced named "Restricted Sparring", which limits the types of Pokémon the player can bring to a battle. The expansion offers a large side quest, which requires the player to track down 151 Alolan Diglett scattered throughout the overworld. The player receives rewards in exchange for finding the Diglett.

The Crown Tundra, the second expansion pack, is also set in one inter-connected "Wild Area." The Crown Tundra features Dynamax Adventures, which can be accessed by in-game location known as the Max Lair. In Dynamax Adventures, players will be given "rental" Pokémon to battle through three different Max Raid Battles. After beating a Max Raid Battle, the player can choose which Raid Boss, out of a selection, to choose next. After battling each Raid Pokémon, the player must battle a Legendary Pokémon from previous games in the series. The player can choose to catch the Legendary Pokémon, which have a 100% chance of being caught, or they can choose to leave it and encounter it again later. These Dynamax Adventures can be played online or in single player, and are included as a part of the story. The expansion's story additionally features the return of several returning Legendary Pokémon, which must be fought and captured in order to progress, with an additional side quest focusing on the Pokémon Virizion, Cobalion, Terrakion and Keldeo. Another new feature in the expansion are the Galarian Star Tournaments, which are tournaments where the player and one other character of the player's choice engage in Multi-Trainer battles with other characters from Sword & Shield and the expansion pass.

== Plot ==
=== The Isle of Armor ===
The player visits the Isle of Armor, where they encounter a student, named Klara (In Sword) or Avery (In Shield) of the local Master Dojo, who act as the player's rivals. The player meets the Dojo's master, Mustard. The player joins the Dojo, and is challenged to complete three trials to obtain the Dojo's "secret armor." The player completes the first two trials, but is forced to fight Klara or Avery, who attempt to cheat in their battles, for their third trial. After the third trial is completed, the player is gifted the Legendary Pokémon Kubfu. Mustard tasks the player with becoming friends with Kubfu. After the player attains maximum friendship with Kubfu, Mustard asks the player to go to either the Tower of Waters or the Tower of Darkness. Mustard waits at the top floor of the player's chosen tower, and battles the player with his own Kubfu. After defeating him, Mustard lets the player evolve Kubfu using a scroll in the tower, with the tower chosen affecting which form of Urshifu Kubfu evolves into.

If the player has completed the main story of Pokémon Sword and Shield, the player will team up with their friend Hop to find a way to let Urshifu Gigantamax. They manage to find a way to do so, and Mustard asks the player to fight him in a no holds barred battle. Upon his defeat, Mustard declares he has nothing more left to teach the player, allowing them to graduate from the Dojo.

=== The Crown Tundra ===
The player visits the Crown Tundra, where they meet a man named Peony and his daughter Peonia. Peonia does not want to join her father on an adventure in the Tundra and uses the player to distract her father while she goes to the Max Lair. Peony and the player enter the Max Lair, and Peonia has the player take her place in Peony's adventure.

Peony instructs the player to go on multiple adventures featuring Legendary Pokémon. He requests the player hunt down the Galarian forms of the Legendary Pokémon Articuno, Zapdos, and Moltres, who scatter to various areas in the Galar region. He also requests the player capture the Legendary Pokémon Regirock, Regice, Registeel, and one of Regieleki or Regidrago. Another request involves uncovering the mystery of Calyrex, a Pokémon who used to rule the Galar region as its king but was reduced to a weakened state. The player and Peony help Calyrex reunite with its steed, either Glastrier or Spectrier, restoring its power. Calyrex willingly joins the player on their journey, letting them capture it after a battle. After all of the Legendary Pokémon are captured, Peonia arrives to join Peony's adventure, but runs off again after Peony informs her of the player's completion of all the adventures he had prepared.

Following this, the player finds a note involving Ultra Wormholes, with Ultra Beasts, Pokémon from other dimensions, appearing in the Max Lair. After Necrozma is captured in the Max Lair, the scientist manning the Max Lair reveals she wrote the note, resolving the plot. Another plot involves Leon, the former Galar League Champion, announcing the Galarian Star Tournament, a competition of the best Trainers which the player can partake in.

== Development and release ==
The decision to create the Expansion Pass instead of another "expanded" game - such as Pokémon Yellow or Pokémon Ultra Sun and Ultra Moon - was partly to streamline the process of adding new features without needing to release another game. During an interview with GamesRadar+, The Pokémon Company mentioned that the decision to swap to a DLC format was due to the series' move to the Nintendo Switch. According to the company, the hybrid console provided more technological power; allowing the developers to create a large DLC and explore more possibilities than on the handhelds they previously developed for. Speaking to Game Informer, The Pokémon Company also mentioned that developers were apprehensive on moving to making DLC, but added that an advantage of the DLCs would be that players would not need to restart their progress or rebuild their Pokémon teams in order to experience the new features.

Independently, Sword and Shield producer and the DLC's composer Junichi Masuda shared similar comments saying that whilst in the past the company had developed new software set in the same region, the Expansion Pass allowed players to experience a new adventure directly from the same game. Additionally, he stated that the themes for the Expansion Pass were "longer, deeper, and newer", which would emphasize continuity. Another factor that fueled the creation of the expansion pass came from the early development of the base game- developers had many ideas left over from the base game due to these ideas not fitting with the core experience of Sword and Shield.

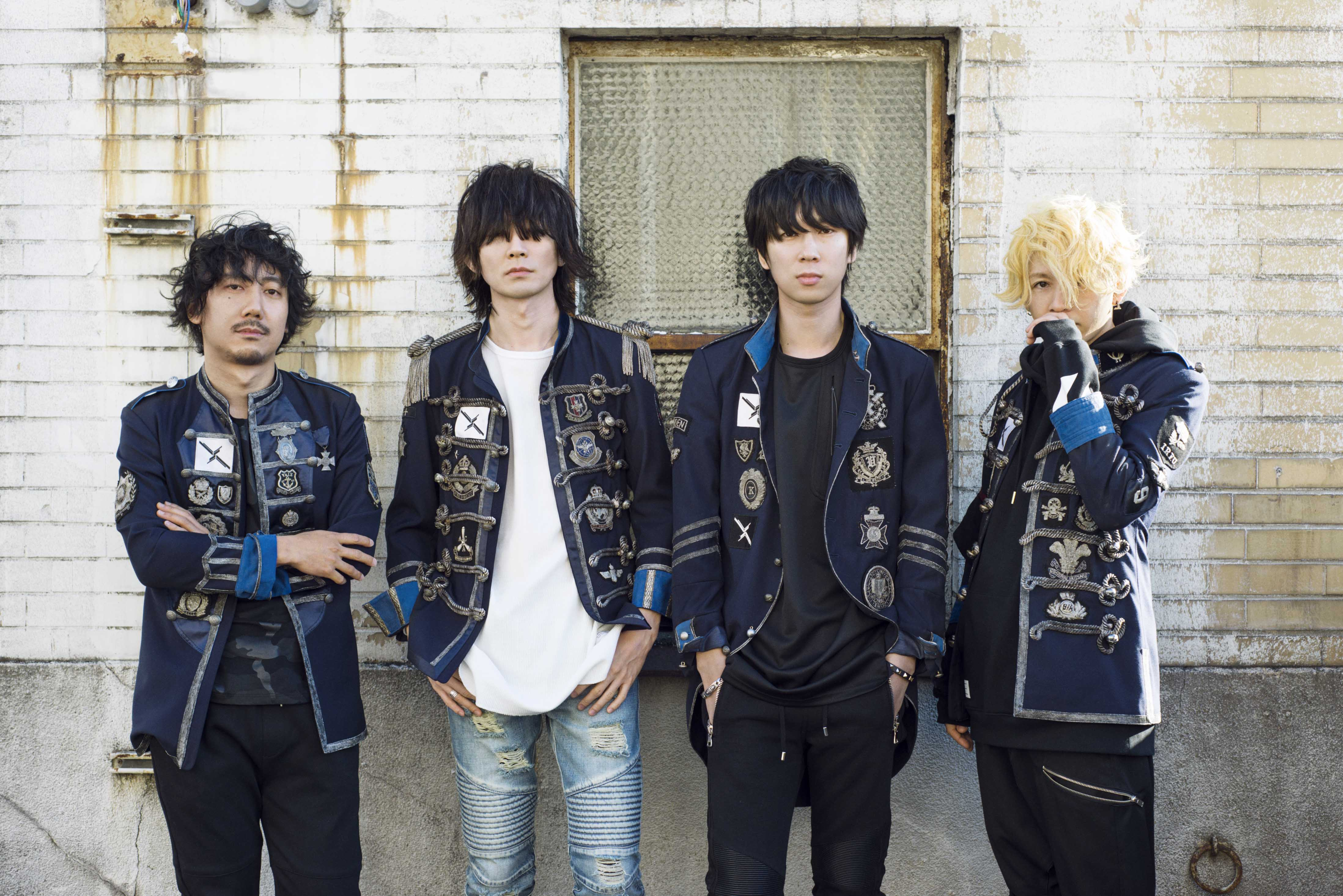
Japanese band Bump of Chicken created the single Acacia as a tribute to the Pokémon franchise, as well as to celebrate the release of The Crown Tundra.

One such idea ended up being the Dynamax Adventures introduced in The Crown Tundra. The creation of Dynamax Adventures started out with developers wanting to add new features to the Max Raid Battles gimmick introduced in the base game. This led to the implementation of returning Legendary Pokémon into Dynamax Adventures, which was done out of a desire to "change the way in which Legendary Pokémon are captured in [the] games". Due to the amount of ideas leftover, the developers came to the decision to create two expansive areas to flesh the ideas out. These areas, the Isle of Armor and the Crown Tundra, are based on the Isle of Man and Scotland respectively, according to the Pokémon UK Twitter account. During an interview with IGN, it was mentioned that depending on how far into the game the expansion pack would be entered, the levels of the Pokémon in The Isle of Armor would be scaled accordingly. After the release of The Isle of Armor, IGN reported that players discovered the DLC areas would instead scale with the number of Gym Badges the player has, similar to the base game's Wild Area with a level cap of sixty, although adding that some encounters can appear at level eighty instead.

The expansion pass was first announced in a Pokémon Direct on January 9, 2020, followed by a brief appearance in a Nintendo Direct Mini on March 26. The Isle of Armor was released on June 17, 2020. Following the release of the first expansion pack, a detailed presentation of the pass was aired during a Pokémon Presents on June 24 the following week. A follow-up on information was released on September 29, during a DLC-focused livestream presentation. At the end of the presentation was a music video for Acacia, titled "GOTCHA!", a song from Japanese alternative rock band Bump of Chicken, which acted as both a celebration of The Crown Tundra as well as the franchise in general. The Crown Tundra was released on October 23, 2020. A physical bundle of both the base game and the expansion pass released on November 6, 2020.

== Reception ==
=== The Isle of Armor ===
Reception

Aggregate scores
Aggregator	Score
Metacritic	69/100 (Note: Score based on 47 reviews.)
OpenCritic	33% recommend(The Isle of Armor) (Note: Based on 50 reviews.)

Review scores
Publication	Score
4Players	76/100
Destructoid	7/10
GameSpot	8/10
IGN	7/10
Jeuxvideo.com	11/20
Nintendo Life	8/10
TouchArcade	4/5

According to review aggregator website Metacritic, The Isle of Armor received "mixed or average reviews"; Metacritic rated it 69/100 based on 47 reviews. GameSpot praised its expansion of the Wild Area from Sword and Shield's base game, as well as the expansion's side content, though they felt the expansion lacked content for players who had already completed the game. IGN additionally praised the game's expansion of the Wild Area, new mechanics, and the usage of returning Pokémon, though they criticized the story's lack of narrative weight, lack of difficulty, and the usage of Klara and Avery as rivals to the player.

Alex Olney of Nintendo Life praised the expansion's improvement on the Wild Area mechanic and the additional mechanics added in the DLC, though he criticized the graphical quality and the writing for Klara and Avery. Chris Carter of Destructoid found that while the game was a more relaxing experience, he felt as though the game's story was lacking, and felt it did not offer much for returning players. Sam Loveridge of GamesRadar+ felt that while the game was a fun experience, it did not offer much to excite fans, criticizing its repetitive content.

Gene Park, writing for The Washington Post, praised the expansions and improvements to the game's Wild Area. He criticized the short story, small amount of gameplay features, and issues with online features. Ben Sledge, writing for NME, praised the expansion's exploration elements and character writing, but criticized the lack of difficulty and framerate issues present in the expansion. Alana Hagues, writing for RPGFan, found the expansion to be a fun experience, finding it fun and to have several additions that enhanced the main game, but criticized the expansion's short duration and the restriction of certain gameplay features to the DLC that Hagues felt should have been in the expansion's base game.

=== The Crown Tundra ===
Reception

Aggregate scores
Aggregator	Score
Metacritic	75/100 (Note: Score based on 27 reviews.)
OpenCritic	64% recommend(The Crown Tundra) (Note: Based on 28 reviews.)

Review scores
Publication	Score
4Players	77/100
Destructoid	7.5/10
IGN	8/10
Jeuxvideo.com	13/20
Nintendo Life	7/10

According to review aggregator website Metacritic, The Crown Tundra received "positive reviews"; Metacritic rated it 75/100 based on 27 reviews. Chris Carter of Destructoid responded positively to the expansion. While he criticized some of the expansion's areas and content, he felt that the game had more to offer for fans, highlighting the more "focused" story and several game mechanics, such as the Max Lair and the Galarian Star Tournament. Travis Northup of IGN praised the expansion's exploration mechanics and the Max Lair, but felt the various Legendary Pokémon encounters quickly became repetitive and that the Galarian Star Tournament was an underwhelming feature. Chris Tapsell of Eurogamer praised the expansion's focus on exploration the design of the game's Crown Tundra location, and the Max Lair feature. Despite minor criticisms to the graphics and the Max Lair mechanic, he felt the expansions greatly improved upon Pokémon Sword and Shield's mechanics and features.

Alex Olney of Nintendo Life praised the expansion's focus and narrative, highlighting the plot line for the Galarian Forms of Articuno, Zapdos, and Moltres, as well as the game's exploration. He criticized the plot line for the Regi, as well as the graphical quality of the Crown Tundra, believing that the expansion was emblematic of the series being held back by using outdated mechanics and game design choices. Just Lunning of Inverse praised the expansion's smaller plot lines, highlighting its usage of Legendary Pokémon, but criticized the Max Lair's usage of Legendary Pokémon, feeling it undercut the series' pre-established worldbuilding. He additionally criticized the Galarian Star Tournament, feeling its focus on Galar's scope made the games feel isolated from the rest of the series.

James Galizalo, writing for RPG Site, praised the Crown Tundra's exploratory elements and the Max Lair, but also criticized the price tag for the expansion, stating that "it felt like it offered less content for $60 than the 3DS games offered for $40." Alana Hagues, writing for RPG Fan, highlighted the expansion's story and exploration elements, but criticized the lack of variety in the expansion's locations in comparison to The Isle of Armor.

== See also ==
- Pokémon Sword and Shield
- Pokémon Scarlet and Violet: The Hidden Treasure of Area Zero
