= Pokémon (video game series) =

Japanese video game series

- Genre: Role-playing
- Developers: Game Freak; ILCA
- Publishers: Nintendo; The Pokémon Company
- Creator: Satoshi Tajiri
- Artist: Ken Sugimori
- Composer: Junichi Masuda
- Platforms: Game Boy; Game Boy Color; Game Boy Advance; Nintendo DS; Nintendo 3DS; iOS, Android; Nintendo Switch; Nintendo Switch 2
- First release: Pocket Monsters Red and Green (Japan); February 27, 1996
- Latest release: Pokémon Legends: Z-A; October 16, 2025
- Spin-offs: See List of Pokémon spin-offs

Pokémon (Note: Japanese: ポケットモンスター, Hepburn: Poketto Monsutā) is a Japanese role-playing video game series developed by Game Freak (Note: Pokémon Brilliant Diamond and Shining Pearl are the only core series games not developed by Game Freak; they were instead developed by ILCA.) and published by Nintendo and the Pokémon Company under the Pokémon franchise. It was created by Satoshi Tajiri with assistance from Ken Sugimori. The first games, Pocket Monsters Red and Green, were released in 1996 in Japan for the Game Boy, later released outside of Japan as Pokémon Red Version and Blue Version. The main series of RPGs, known officially as the "core series", has continued on each generation of Nintendo's handhelds. The most recently released core series game, Pokémon Legends: Z-A, was released on October 16, 2025, for the Nintendo Switch and the Nintendo Switch 2.

In addition to Game Freak's development, Creatures provides support through their Pokémon CG Studio, which creates 3D models for the Pokémon in the games, and also develops some spin-off titles. In 1998, Nintendo, Creatures, and Game Freak jointly established the Pokémon Company, which manages licensing, production, publishing, marketing and deals for the franchise both within Asia and worldwide through the Pokémon Company International.

The core games are released in generations, each with different Pokémon, storylines, and characters. Remakes of the games are usually released around a decade after the original versions for the latest console at the time. While the main series consists of RPGs developed by Game Freak, many spin-off games based on the series have been developed by various companies, encompassing other genres such as action role-playing, puzzle, fighting, and digital pet games.

By November 2017, more than 300 million Pokémon games had been sold worldwide on handheld and home consoles, across 76 titles, including spin-offs. As of March 2026, the series has sold over 515 million units worldwide. This makes Pokémon the fourth best-selling video game franchise, behind the Mario franchise, Call of Duty, and Tetris.

== Gameplay ==
Chart of the eighteen Pokémon types and their weaknesses (2, in green), resistances (½, in red), and immunities (0, in black)

Each game in the Pokémon series takes place in a fictional region of the Pokémon World, typically based on a real-world location, and begins with the player receiving a Starter Pokémon, usually from that region's Pokémon Professor. Players have the option to choose one of three different types of Pokémon. Many games include a rival character who acts as a roadblock or boss opponent throughout the game. A major subplot of most games is to defeat a criminal organization, whose intents are usually trying to take over the world through the misuse of powerful Pokémon known as Legendary Pokémon.

A battle in Pokémon Black and White

Battles between Pokémon are the central game mechanic of the Pokémon games. Within the game, they are used to train Pokémon to gain experience and become stronger and to progress through the game's story. Battles can also be done between players by connecting at least two game systems. Pokémon uses a turn-based system. The player may carry between one and six Pokémon in their active party; the first Pokémon in the lineup is automatically sent into battle when one begins. At the start of each turn, both sides may use a move, use an item, switch their active Pokémon out for another in their party, or attempt to flee from battle if against a wild Pokémon. Each Pokémon uses attacks to reduce their opponent's Hit Points (HP) to zero, at which point the Pokémon faints and is unable to battle. Pokémon also have in-battle "abilities", which give them different attributes in battle. When an opponent's Pokémon faints, the player's Pokémon receives experience points; when a Pokémon accumulates enough, then its level increases. If the player's Pokémon faints, they may select another Pokémon from their active party to battle; in battles against wild Pokémon, the player may attempt to flee instead. If all of a player's Pokémon faint, the player loses the battle. This causes the player to lose some money and return to the last Pokémon Center they visited. Pokémon Legends: Z-A uses a real-time battle system where a player and the Pokémon moves around the field using moves strategically, albeit with a similar system of one to six Pokémon and the ability to level up through battle or with the use of items. The player will only return to a Pokémon Center after the player themselves has enough damage inflicted on them by a wild Pokémon. Since their introduction in Pokémon Ruby and Sapphire, abilities were absent in Pokémon: Let's Go, Pikachu!, Let's Go, Eevee!, Legends: Arceus, and Legends: Z-A.

A Pokémon's type is an elemental attribute determining the strengths and weaknesses of each Pokémon and its moves. These types interact in rock–paper–scissors-style relationships: Pokémon take double damage from attacking moves of types they are weak to and half damage from moves of types they resist. Some types have special properties unrelated to the damage chart; for example, certain types cannot be affected by certain status conditions.

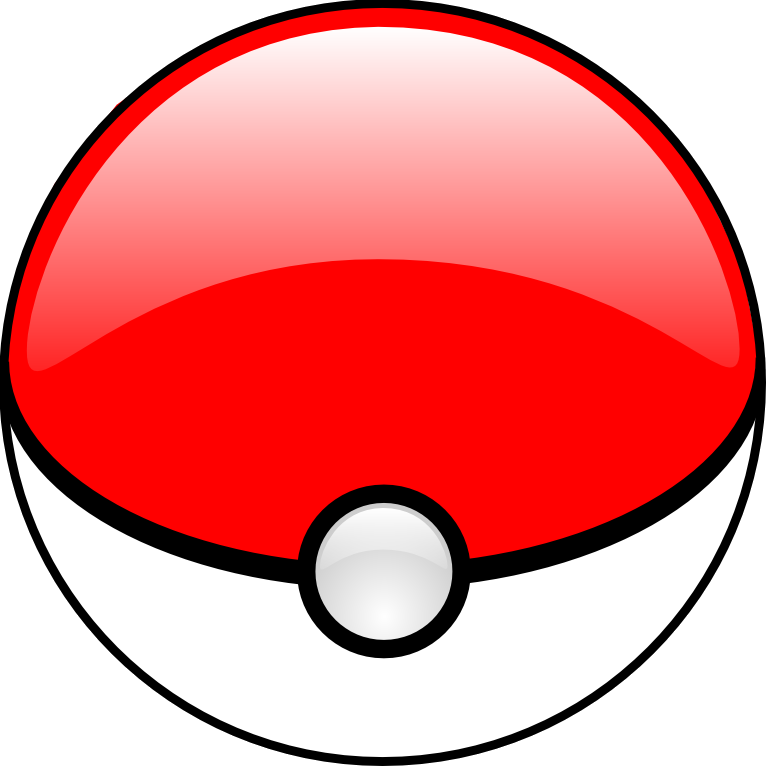
Poké Balls are used to capture Pokémon.

Players can catch Pokémon in the wild, engaging with them in a Pokémon battle. In most Pokémon games, (Note: Capturing wild Pokémon through weakening in battle is not used in Pokémon: Let's Go, Pikachu! and Let's Go, Eevee!, and weaker or distracted Pokémon can be optionally caught before a battle begins in Pokémon Legends: Arceus and Legends: Z-A.) players aim to weaken wild Pokémon in battle to then throw a Poké Ball, which are used to capture the Pokémon and add it to the player's team or get sent to storage. Pokémon can "evolve" once they reach a certain benchmark, such as by reaching a certain level, having an item used on them, or by having a high level of friendship. This changes their form and appearance and causes them to grow stronger. Players have the ability to trade their Pokémon with one another by connecting two compatible games. Because of the Pokémon series revolving around catching as many Pokémon as possible, trading is considered an important aspect of Pokémon. Certain Pokémon are only able to evolve by trading as well. Players also may encounter alternately colored Pokémon known as "Shiny Pokémon", which are significantly rarer than a standard Pokémon.

Various facilities can be found throughout the Pokémon world such as Pokémon Centers, Poké Marts, and Pokémon Gyms. At a Pokémon Center, the player can have their Pokémon healed for free and access the PC, where players can organize their collection of Pokémon and store and withdraw items. The PC was retired beginning with Pokémon: Let's Go, Pikachu! and Let's Go, Eevee!, and in every game since then (with the exception of Pokémon Legends: Arceus) the collection of Pokémon outside of the main party are accessible by the player at any point out of battle. Poké Marts are shops where players can buy items with the money they win during battles; certain cities may have specialized shops, like a pharmacy or a department store. Periodically, a town will contain a Pokémon Gym, which houses a powerful Trainer known as a Gym Leader that functions as a boss. Victory against them grants the player a Gym Badge; after collecting eight Gym Badges, the player may challenge the region's Elite Four and Pokémon League Champion (in Pokémon Sword and Shield, the Elite Four is replaced by the Champion Cup, a single-elimination tournament that determines who gets the right to challenge the Pokémon League Champion). Gyms are absent in Pokémon Sun, Moon, Ultra Sun, and Ultra Moon, being replaced by trials that serve a similar purpose. Pokémon Legends: Arceus and Legends: Z-A do not use Gyms, and only have a single major settlement in each game. Z-A has the player reach higher ranks by battling strong opponents from Lumiose City in an event called the Z-A Royale. Many games also have facilities dedicated to battling, such as the Battle Frontier, Battle Tower, and Battle Maison, that unlock after the game is beaten. Afterward, the game remains virtually open-ended, with the ultimate goal of the player being to obtain at least one member of each of the different species of Pokémon, thus completing a fictional encyclopedia of all Pokémon species known as a Pokédex. Filling the Pokédex is a more major part of the progression of Legends: Arceus than in other games.

=== Recurring characters ===
The series features a wide supporting cast, but does not feature many recurring characters. Several recurring characters are listed below.

- Red (レッド, Reddo) is the player character of Pokémon Red, Green, Blue and Yellow and the male protagonist of Pokémon FireRed and LeafGreen. Red is a silent character, and has no distinct storyline or role within the wider series narrative following his first appearance. Red appears in Pokémon Gold, Silver, and Crystal and their remakes, where he serves as the strongest opponent a player can battle in the game. 2016 games Pokémon Sun and Moon also feature Red, who is depicted twenty years after the events of the first games in the series. Red also appears in Pokémon Black 2 and White 2 and Pokémon: Let's Go, Pikachu! and Let's Go, Eevee!. In the Pokémon Adventures manga, he serves as a main protagonist, and he also serves as the main protagonist of the Pokémon Pocket Monsters manga. He also appears in Pokémon Origins, an anime adaptation of the original games.
- Professor Samuel Oak (オーキド・ユキナリ博士, Ōkido Yukinari-hakase) is a Pokémon Researcher and the grandfather of Blue. He is an important researcher, having studied them his whole life, and in his youth was a Pokémon Trainer himself. In the first games in the series, he gives players their first Pokémon. Following this, he appears in various roles in subsequent games Gold, Silver, and Crystal and Diamond, Pearl, and Platinum, and additionally appears in a number of spin-off titles. Oak also plays a recurring role in the Pokémon anime series. Different characters based on Oak have appeared as well. His relative, Samson Oak, appears in Sun and Moon, while another character, dubbed Grand Oak, appears in the spin-off game Pokémon Home.
- Blue (グリーン, Gurīn; lit. 'Green') is the rival character of Pokémon Red, Green, Blue, Yellow, FireRed, and LeafGreen. He is the grandson of Professor Oak and the player character's childhood friend. He is pushy and competitive, and always a step ahead of the player's progress throughout the games. He manages to become Pokémon League Champion, but is defeated by the player. He reappears in Pokémon Gold, Silver, Crystal and their remakes, having become a Gym Leader, where he has mellowed as a person from his prior appearance. He later reappears in Black 2 and White 2, and also appears in Sun and Moon alongside Red, depicted twenty years after the events of the original games. He also appears in Let's Go, Pikachu! and Let's Go, Eevee!. Blue appears in the Pokémon Adventures manga, where he is a major recurring character who serves as Red's rival, and also serves in a rival role in Origins. He also appears in the Pokémon Generations anime series.
- Giovanni (サカキ, Sakaki) is the leader of the villainous criminal organization known as Team Rocket. He also runs the Viridian City Gym in Pokémon Red, Blue, Green, Yellow, and their remakes. He later disappears and is not seen again, though Team Rocket attempts to locate him in Pokémon Gold, Silver, Crystal, and their remakes. Their remakes feature a special event in which the player can fight Giovanni, which reveals why Team Rocket was unable to locate Giovanni during the events of the games' story. He appears again in Black 2 and White 2, and later appears as the primary antagonist in Pokémon Ultra Sun and Ultra Moon's post-game story, serving as the leader of the "Team Rainbow Rocket" organization. Giovanni appears in spin-off game Pokémon Go, where he leads the villainous "Team Go Rocket" organization, and also serves as a primary antagonist in spin-off game Pokémon Masters EX. Giovanni is a recurring character in the Pokémon anime series, where he is the boss of Team Rocket.
- Steven Stone (ツワブキ・ダイゴ, Tsuwabuki Daigo) is the Hoenn League Champion in Ruby, Sapphire, Omega Ruby, and Alpha Sapphire. He is interested in rocks and minerals, and acts as a mentor to the player during the course of the game. Steven plays various roles throughout the plot, including aiding in stopping the villainous organizations Team Magma and Team Aqua, and serves as the final boss of the game. In Emerald, Steven is a wandering Trainer, with his friend Wallace taking on the mantle of Hoenn League Champion in his place. Steven appears again in HeartGold and SoulSilver and Black 2 and White 2. Steven also serves a recurring role in the Pokémon anime series.
- Cynthia (シロナ, Shirona) is the Sinnoh League Champion, first appearing in Pokémon Diamond and Pearl. She is interested in mythology and history and spends her time researching and exploring various sites associated with Legendary Pokémon of the Sinnoh Region. In the games, she helps the protagonist against the villainous organization Team Galactic during the games' story, and she serves as the game's final boss. Cynthia reappears in Pokémon Black and White, Black 2 and White 2, and Sun and Moon, as well as the remakes of Diamond and Pearl. She also serves as a recurring character in the Pokémon anime series.
- Hex Maniac (オカルトマニア, Okarutomania; lit. 'Occult Maniac') is actually not one individual character, but a Trainer class that specializes in Ghost-type Pokémon. Originally introduced in Pokémon Ruby and Sapphire, they received a redesign in Pokémon X and Y. This version appears as a woman with messy dark blue hair, a purple headband, a long black dress with a spiderweb pattern around the waist, and darkened eyes with a spiral pattern. Since the redesign, they have been cited as one of the most popular characters for their unique appearance, gaining additional notoriety due to an unexplained encounter in Pokémon X and Y. In the franchise, this version of Hex Maniac has been used for Pokémon events related to urban legends, and one named Helena (Sayoko in Japanese) appears as a playable character in mobile game Pokémon Masters EX.
- "Looker" (ハンサム, Hansamu; lit. 'Handsome') is a member of the international police who appears in Pokémon Platinum, where he is investigating Team Galactic. He is a master of disguise, and though initially incompetent, he is treated more seriously as a character as the series progresses. He appears again in Black and White, seeking the player's assistance in apprehending several members of the criminal organization Team Plasma. In X and Y, he poses as a detective to apprehend members of the criminal organization Team Flare, and ends up taking in an orphan girl named Emma. In Pokémon Legends: Z-A, taking place five years after the events of X and Y, Emma has taken over his office in Lumiose City and operates as a detective herself. In Sun and Moon, he appears assisting the player with capturing the Ultra Beasts that were unleashed there, eventually alerting the player to the Legendary Pokémon Necrozma.

== Development ==
Release timeline First entry in generation in bold
| 1996 | **Red and Green** |
| 1996 | Blue |
1997
| 1998 | Yellow |
| 1998 | Red and Blue |
| 1999 | **Gold and Silver** |
| 2000 | Crystal |
2001
| 2002 | **Ruby and Sapphire** |
2003
| 2004 | FireRed and LeafGreen |
| 2004 | Emerald |
2005
| 2006 | **Diamond and Pearl** |
2007
| 2008 | Platinum |
| 2009 | HeartGold and SoulSilver |
| 2010 | **Black and White** |
2011
| 2012 | Black 2 and White 2 |
| 2013 | **X and Y** |
| 2014 | Omega Ruby and Alpha Sapphire |
2015
| 2016 | **Sun and Moon** |
| 2017 | Ultra Sun and Ultra Moon |
| 2018 | Let's Go, Pikachu! and Let's Go, Eevee! |
| 2019 | **Sword and Shield** |
| 2020 | Sword and Shield: The Isle of Armor (DLC) |
| 2020 | Sword and Shield: The Crown Tundra (DLC) |
| 2021 | Brilliant Diamond and Shining Pearl |
| 2022 | Legends: Arceus |
| 2022 | **Scarlet and Violet** |
| 2023 | The Teal Mask (DLC) |
| 2023 | The Indigo Disk (DLC) |
| 2024 | Mochi Mayhem (DLC) |
| 2025 | Legends: Z-A |
| 2025 | Mega Dimension (DLC) |
2026
| 2027 | **Winds and Waves** |

All of the licensed Pokémon properties overseen by the Pokémon Company are divided roughly by generation. These generations are roughly chronological divisions by release; when an official sequel in the main role-playing game series is released that features new Pokémon, characters, and possibly new gameplay concepts, that sequel is considered the start of a new generation of the franchise. The main games and their spin-offs, the anime, manga, and trading card game are all updated with the new Pokémon properties each time a new generation begins. The franchise began its ninth and current generation with Pokémon Scarlet and Violet, which were released worldwide for the Nintendo Switch on November 18, 2022.

=== 1996–1998: First generation ===
Pokémon Red, Blue, and Yellow, released in 1996 for the Game Boy, were the first games in the series.

The original Pokémon games are Japanese role-playing video games (RPGs) with an element of strategy and were created by Satoshi Tajiri for the Game Boy. The Pokémon series began with the release of Pocket Monsters Red and Green for the Game Boy in Japan. When these games proved popular, an enhanced Blue version was released sometime after, and the Blue version was reprogrammed as Pokémon Red and Blue for international release. The original Green version was not released outside Japan. Afterwards, a second enhanced remake, Pokémon Yellow, was released to use the color palette of the Game Boy Color and more of a stylistic resemblance to the popular Pokémon anime.

This first generation of games introduced the original 151 species of Pokémon (in National Pokédex order, encompassing all Pokémon from Bulbasaur to Mew), as well as the basic game concepts of capturing, training, battling and trading Pokémon with both computer and human players. These versions of the games take place within the fictional Kanto region, though the name "Kanto" was not used until the second generation.

Spin-off first-generation titles include Pokémon Pinball; an adaptation of the Pokémon Trading Card Game for Game Boy Color; an on-rails photography simulator for Nintendo 64 titled Pokémon Snap; a Nintendo 64 Pokémon-themed adaptation of Tetris Attack, Pokémon Puzzle League. A 3D Nintendo 64 incarnation of the handhelds' battle system, Pokémon Stadium; and a co-starring role for several species in the Nintendo 64 fighting game Super Smash Bros.. At the Nintendo Space World in 2000, a game was revealed briefly with Meowth and Team Rocket singing a song. This was one of the earliest introductions of the Pokémon Togepi and Bellossom. This game was called Meowth's Party, but was not developed into a playable game. Instead, the song/video was played at the end of an episode of Pokémon, and a CD was made for retail in Japan for a limited time. This is the first time MissingNo. was discovered.

On September 12, 1998, the special edition of Pokémon Yellow featuring Pikachu was released in Japan, and it was subsequently introduced in Europe and America in 1999. The original intention behind the game's release was to combine the popular anime with the first theatrical version.

=== 1999–2001: Second generation ===
Pokémon Gold and Silver, released in 1999 for the Game Boy Color, introduced a real-time day-night cycle to the series.

The second generation of Pokémon video games began in 1999 with the Japanese release of Pokémon Gold and Silver for the Game Boy Color, with Australia and North America getting the game in October 2000 and European release date of April 2001. Like the previous generation, an enhanced version, titled Pokémon Crystal, was later released.

This generation introduced 100 new species of Pokémon (starting with Chikorita and ending with Celebi), for a total of 251 Pokémon to collect, train, and battle. New gameplay features include a day-and-night system (reflecting the time of the day in the real world) which influences events in the game; full use of the Game Boy Color's color palette; an improved interface and upgraded inventory system; better balance in the collection of Pokémon and their moves, statistics and equippable items (a new addition); the addition of two new Pokémon types (Dark and Steel) to better balance the strengths and weaknesses of each Pokémon; Pokémon breeding; and a new region named Johto. After exploring Johto, the player can travel east to explore the adjacent Kanto region.

Spin-off games in the second-generation include Pokémon Puzzle Challenge, the adaptation of Pokémon Puzzle League—a puzzle game created by Zoppf industries—made specifically for the Game Boy Color; the Nintendo 64 pet simulator Hey You, Pikachu!; the Pokémon Stadium sequel, Pokémon Stadium 2, for Nintendo 64; several Pokémon mini-games for the e-Reader; and a co-starring role for several Pokémon species in the Super Smash Bros. sequel Super Smash Bros. Melee for the GameCube. The Pokémon Mini is a handheld game console released in December 2001 in Japan and 2002 in Europe and North America. This generation started a trend among even-numbered generations, giving the Pokémon Eevee new type evolutions beyond the original three of the first generation.

=== 2002–2005: Third generation ===
Pokémon Ruby and Sapphire, released in 2002 for the Game Boy Advance, introduced double battles to the series, in which the opposing parties each use two Pokémon at the same time.

Pokémon entered its third generation with the 2002 release of Pokémon Ruby and Sapphire for Game Boy Advance and continued with the Game Boy Advance remakes of Pokémon Red and Green, Pokémon FireRed and LeafGreen (Red and Green representing the original Japanese first generation games; territories outside Japan instead saw releases of Red and Blue). An enhanced version of Pokémon Ruby and Sapphire titled Pokémon Emerald followed after.

The third generation introduced 135 new Pokémon (starting with Treecko and ending with Deoxys) for a total of 386 species. It also features a more visually detailed environment compared to previous games, "natures" which affect Pokémon stats, a new 2-on-2 Pokémon battling mechanic, a special ability system applying to each Pokémon in battle, the Pokémon Contest sub-game, the new region of Hoenn, the ability to select the protagonist's gender and Secret Bases: customizable "rooms" where the player can display items they have collected in-game and battle against real friends. Secret Bases can be found in bushes, trees, or small cave openings in landscapes by using the Pokémon move, Secret Power, which can be taught to virtually all Pokémon. However, this generation also garnered some criticism for leaving out several gameplay features, including the day-and-night system introduced in the previous generation (which was removed due to internal-battery save problems), and it was also the first installment that encouraged the player to collect merely a selected assortment of the total number of Pokémon rather than every existing species (202 out of 386 species are catchable in the Ruby and Sapphire versions). It was around this time that the franchise was regaining its popularity, managing to ship over 100 million games worldwide.

Third-generation spin-off titles include Pokémon Pinball: Ruby & Sapphire for Game Boy Advance; Pokémon Mystery Dungeon: Blue Rescue Team and Red Rescue Team for Game Boy Advance and Nintendo DS; Pokémon Dash, Pokémon Trozei! and Pokémon Ranger for Nintendo DS; Pokémon Channel and Pokémon Box: Ruby and Sapphire for GameCube; and two role-playing games for the GameCube, consisting of the games Pokémon Colosseum and Pokémon XD: Gale of Darkness.

=== 2006–2009: Fourth generation ===
Pokémon Diamond and Pearl, released in 2006 for the Nintendo DS, introduced 3D graphics for background elements to the series, while foreground elements retained the classic 2D look.

In 2006, Japan began the fourth generation of the franchise with the release of Pokémon Diamond and Pearl for Nintendo DS. The games were released in North America on April 22, 2007, and in Australia on June 21, 2007. The game was released in the UK and Europe on July 27, 2007. Other main series games in the fourth generation include Pokémon Platinum, a director's cut version of Diamond and Pearl in the same vein as Pokémon Yellow, Crystal, and Emerald. It was released for the Nintendo DS in Japan on September 13, 2008, in North America on March 22, 2009, and in Australia and Europe on May 14, 2009, and May 22, 2009, respectively. It was also announced that Pokémon Gold and Silver would be remade for the Nintendo DS as Pokémon HeartGold and SoulSilver. Released in Japan on September 12, 2009, the games were later released to North America, Australia, and Europe during March 2010.

The fourth-generation introduces another 107 new species of Pokémon (starting with Turtwig and ending with Arceus), bringing the number of Pokémon species to 493. This generation is the first to have 3D graphics in the main series game, although it is still a mixture of both 3D graphics and sprites. New gameplay concepts include a restructured move-classification system, online multiplayer trading and battling via Nintendo Wi-Fi Connection, the return (and expansion) of the second generation's day-and-night system, the expansion of the third generation's Pokémon Contests into "Super Contests", and the new region of Sinnoh, which has an underground component for multiplayer gameplay in addition to the main overworld. Secret Bases also appear in Sinnoh but can only be created and housed in Sinnoh's underground. HeartGold and SoulSilver also introduced the Pokéathlon to the Johto region, which consists of many Pokémon based sporting events making use of the stylus.

Spin-off games in the fourth generation include the Pokémon Stadium follow-up Pokémon Battle Revolution for Wii (which has Wi-Fi connectivity as well), Pokémon Ranger: Shadows of Almia and Pokémon Ranger: Guardian Signs for Nintendo DS, Pokémon Mystery Dungeon: Explorers of Time and Explorers of Darkness and their sister game, Explorers of Sky all for the Nintendo DS, a co-starring role for Pikachu, Jigglypuff, Lucario, and a Pokémon Trainer (who uses Squirtle, Ivysaur, and Charizard for fighting) in the 2008 Wii fighter Super Smash Bros. Brawl as well as a great adventure for Pikachu and friends in PokéPark Wii: Pikachu's Adventure.

=== 2010–2012: Fifth generation ===
Pokémon Black and White, released in 2010 for the Nintendo DS, introduced a real-time seasonal cycle to the series, in addition to featuring the day-night cycle introduced in Gold and Silver.

The fifth generation of Pokémon began on September 18, 2010, with the release of Pokémon Black and White in Japan. They were then released in North America, Europe, and Australia in March 2011. They have released on the Nintendo DS, the same console as its preceding generation. The games take place in the Unova region. New features include the C-Gear, a feature where players can use Wi-Fi options and customizations; two new battle methods ("Triple Battles", where three Pokémon are sent out at once, and Rotation Battles, where three Pokémon are also sent out at the same time, but the trainer can switch one Pokémon out of the three that are present); "Battle Tests", where trainers battle each other to see who has stronger Pokémon; the Pokémon Musicals (similar to Pokémon Contests), which have trainers use their Pokémon to dance in a theater with other Pokémon; and the ability to not waste Technical Machines (TMs), also when found the first time. The other main series games, and the additions to Black and White, titled Pokémon Black 2 and White 2, are direct sequels. They take place in the Unova region two years later and were released in Japan on June 23, 2012, and in North America, Australia, and Europe in October of that year for Nintendo DS. They are somewhat different of their predecessors; there are different protagonist trainers, and many of the other important characters have changed as well. The games also introduced a new feature, the "Pokémon World Tournament", where trainers can battle gym leaders and champions from older regions, including Unova. The games also broke the tradition of releasing a third version as an addition to the primary versions.

This generation introduced a total of 156 new Pokémon (beginning with Victini and ending with Genesect), the most of any generation so far. It was also the first generation where the first new Pokémon in National Pokédex order (Victini) is not a starter. It also introduced another new feature, the seasons, which two Pokémon (Deerling and Sawsbuck) represent. Unlike previous generations, which would introduce some species of Pokémon that were evolutionary relatives of older-generation Pokémon, the fifth generation's selection was all-original, in an attempt to make the primary versions feel like a brand-new game.

Spin-off fifth generation games include sequels Pokémon Rumble Blast and Pokémon Mystery Dungeon: Gates to Infinity for Nintendo 3DS, PokéPark 2: Wonders Beyond for Wii, and Pokémon Rumble U for Wii U, a downloadable game. Others include Learn with Pokémon: Typing Adventure (a typing game) and Pokémon Conquest (a crossover game) for Nintendo DS, and downloadable reference applications Pokédex 3D, Pokédex 3D Pro (for Nintendo 3DS), and Pokédex for iOS (for iOS devices), which allows players to view information of Pokémon species while they have 3D models. Various fifth generation Pokémon have appeared in Super Smash Bros. for Nintendo 3DS and Wii U and Super Smash Bros. Ultimate including Reshiram and Zekrom, Klinklang, Axew, Druddigon, and more.

=== 2013–2015: Sixth generation ===
Pokémon X and Y, released in 2013 for the Nintendo 3DS, introduced full 3D graphics to the series.

On December 24, 2012, Japanese magazine Nintendo Dream posted a greetings card sent out by Game Freak. In the card, Junichi Masuda exclaimed that during 2013, they intend to further evolve the world of Pokémon. On December 29, 2012, a new Pokémon Black 2 and White 2 commercial aired in Japan, and ending with a message, informing Pokémon fans that the latest news would be announced on January 8, 2013. On January 4, 2013, both the Japanese and English Pokémon website confirmed that an announcement would be made on January 8. On January 7, 2013, the Japanese website explained that the Nintendo president, Satoru Iwata would hold a 10-minute "Pokémon Direct" video conference to announce the big Pokémon news. On January 8, 2013, Satoru Iwata announced the sixth generation of Pokémon, with the new paired games, Pokémon X and Y, which were released on the Nintendo 3DS on October 12, 2013, worldwide. The X and Y games are rendered in full 3D; however, only select parts of the game can be displayed in stereoscopic 3D. The video introduced the player characters, the starter Pokémon; Grass-type Chespin (Japanese: Harimaron (ハリマロン)), the Fire-type Fennekin (Japanese: Fokko (フォッコ)), and the Water-type Froakie (Japanese: Keromatsu (ケロマツ)), and two other Pokémon, not named until later; a bird-like Pokémon called Yveltal (イベルタル, Iberutaru) having a shape similar to the letter Y and a deer-like Pokémon called Xerneas (ゼルネアス, Zeruneasu) with X-shapes in its eyes. A month later, Sylveon (Japanese: Nymphia (ニンフィア, Ninfia)), a new evolved form of Eevee belonging to the games' new Fairy-type was revealed and is currently the last Eeveelution to be revealed. On May 7, 2014, Nintendo revealed the games Pokémon Omega Ruby and Alpha Sapphire in a teaser trailer, remakes of the third generation games Pokémon Ruby and Sapphire. They were released worldwide in November 2014.

This generation introduced a total of 72 new Pokémon, the new Fairy type, Mega Evolution, the Kalos region, Trainer customization, Super Training, and three new battle modes: Sky Battles, Horde Encounters, and Inverse Battle. This generation is also the first to be compatible with Pokémon Bank.

Greninja, the final evolved form of Froakie, would later go on to represent the sixth generation of Pokémon in the hit fighting game, Super Smash Bros. for Nintendo 3DS and Wii U. On August 26, 2014, Pokkén Tournament was announced and was released on July 16, 2015, in Japanese arcades and was released on March 18, 2016, worldwide for Wii U. It was developed by Bandai Namco Entertainment. In July 2016, Niantic and Nintendo released a free-to-play augmented reality game titled Pokémon Go which was released for Android and iOS devices.

=== 2016–2018: Seventh generation ===
During a Nintendo Direct presentation on February 26, 2016, two new Pokémon titles were announced, titled Pokémon Sun and Moon. The games were released on the Nintendo 3DS on November 18, 2016, in Japan, North America, and Australia, and in Europe on November 23, 2016. The games were the first since the second generation to be backwards-compatible with other titles, including Pokémon X and Y; Pokémon Omega Ruby and Alpha Sapphire; and the Virtual Console re-releases of Pokémon Red, Blue and Yellow. On June 6, 2017, Pokémon Ultra Sun and Ultra Moon were announced. The two games offer new additions to the story of Pokémon Sun and Moon, including new features, and was released worldwide on the Nintendo 3DS on November 17, 2017. On May 29, 2018, two new Pokémon games in the main Pokémon franchise, Pokémon: Let's Go, Pikachu! and Pokémon: Let's Go, Eevee!, were announced. They are remakes of Pokémon Yellow with gameplay mechanics borrowed from Pokémon Go and were released worldwide on the Nintendo Switch on November 16, 2018.

In total, this generation introduced 88 new Pokémon, Alolan forms, trials, Z-moves, Poké Pelago, and Festival Plaza. It was also the first one to introduce Pokémon mid-generation, with five new Pokémon making their debut in Pokémon Ultra Sun and Ultra Moon, and two new Pokémon debuting in Let's Go, Pikachu! and Let's Go, Eevee!

=== 2019–2022: Eighth generation ===
During E3 2017, Nintendo and the Pokémon Company announced that Game Freak was developing a new core Pokémon role-playing game set to release for the Nintendo Switch in "2018 or later." The game is the eighth generation of Pokémon. Along with the announcement of Pokémon: Let's Go, Pikachu! and Pokémon: Let's Go, Eevee! it was confirmed that another core Pokémon role-playing game would be released in late 2019. It was clarified that the 2019 game was the one mentioned during E3 2017, not the Let's Go games. Game director Junichi Masuda stated that it would also "follow in the tradition of Pokémon X and Y and Pokémon Sun and Moon". The CEO of the Pokémon Company, Tsunekazu Ishihara, also confirmed that the upcoming core title would not have influences from Pokémon Go like Let's Go, Pikachu! and Let's Go, Eevee! had. On February 27, 2019, on the 23rd anniversary of the franchise, Pokémon Sword and Shield were confirmed for Nintendo Switch, which were released worldwide on November 15, 2019. Pokémon Sword and Shield takes place in the Galar region introducing new Pokémon, Galarian forms, the Champion Cup, Dynamax, Gigantamax forms, Max Raid battles, and Pokémon Camp. On January 9, 2020, two expansion packs titled The Isle of Armor and The Crown Tundra were announced. The Isle of Armor was released on June 17, 2020, and The Crown Tundra was released on October 22, 2020. On February 26, 2021, Brilliant Diamond and Shining Pearl were announced, remakes of the fourth generation games Pokémon Diamond and Pearl developed by ILCA and set to release later that year. On the same day, Pokémon Legends: Arceus was announced, a prequel to Brilliant Diamond and Shining Pearl. Brilliant Diamond and Shining Pearl were released on November 19, 2021, while Pokémon Legends: Arceus was released on January 28, 2022.

This generation introduced a total of 96 new Pokémon with 81 revealed in Sword and Shield, 8 revealed in the expansion packs, and 7 revealed in Pokémon Legends: Arceus.

On March 6, 2020, the remake of the Mystery Dungeon, Red and Blue Rescue Team was released titled Pokémon Mystery Dungeon: Rescue Team DX. On November 26, 2020, at the Macy's Thanksgiving parade, Pokémon teased its 2021 25th anniversary logo and details for its special celebration "soon".

=== 2022–2026: Ninth generation ===
On February 27, 2022, Pokémon Scarlet and Violet were announced for the Nintendo Switch, with a late 2022 release date. The games were released on November 18, 2022. On February 27, 2023, a two-part expansion pack was announced titled The Hidden Treasure of Area Zero. Part One, The Teal Mask, was released on September 13, 2023. Part Two, The Indigo Disk, was released on December 14, 2023. An epilogue, Mochi Mayhem, was released on January 11, 2024.

This generation introduced a total of 120 new Pokémon so far with 103 revealed in Scarlet and Violet, 2 revealed in special Tera Raids, 7 revealed in The Teal Mask, 7 revealed in The Indigo Disk, and 1 revealed in Mochi Mayhem, with an overall total of 1025 Pokémon.

On February 27, 2024, Pokémon Legends: Z-A was announced to have a 2025 release on the Nintendo Switch. Later on, it was announced the game would also come to the Nintendo Switch 2. It released for both consoles, digitally and physically, on October 16, 2025. It features a return to Lumiose City of the Kalos region from Pokémon X and Y, and is the first appearance of Mega Evolution in a Pokémon game since Let's Go, Pikachu! and Let's Go, Eevee!

=== 2027–present: Tenth generation ===
On February 27, 2026, Pokémon Winds and Waves were announced for the Nintendo Switch 2, with a 2027 release year.

== Games ==
Summary of main series titles

System
Game Boy
Game Boy Color
Game Boy Advance
Nintendo DS
Nintendo 3DS
Nintendo Switch
Nintendo Switch 2

Generation
First
Second
Third
Fourth
Fifth
Sixth
Seventh
Seventh
Eighth
Ninth
Ninth
Tenth

Main titles
Red & Green; (1996)
Gold & Silver; (1999)
Ruby & Sapphire; (2002)
Diamond & Pearl; (2006)
Black & White; (2010)
X & Y; (2013)
Sun & Moon; (2016)
Sword & Shield; (2019)
Scarlet & Violet; (2022)
Winds & Waves; (2027)

Derivative titles
Blue; (1996)
Black 2 & White 2; (2012)

Upper versions/DLCs
Yellow; (1998)
Crystal; (2000)
Emerald; (2004)
Platinum; (2008)
Ultra Sun & Ultra Moon; (2017)
The Isle of Armor & The Crown Tundra; (2020)
The Hidden Treasure of Area Zero; (2023–2024)

Remake titles
FireRed & LeafGreen; (2004)
HeartGold & SoulSilver; (2009)
Omega Ruby & Alpha Sapphire; (2014)
Let's Go, Pikachu! & Let's Go, Eevee!; (2018)
Brilliant Diamond & Shining Pearl; (2021)

Legends titles
Legends: Arceus; (2022)
Legends: Z-A; (2025)

Legends DLC
Mega Dimension; (2025)

== Reception ==
Sales and aggregate review scores As of February 3, 2026.
| Game | Year | Units sold (in millions) | GameRankings | Metacritic |
|---|---|---|---|---|
| Pokémon Red and Blue | 1996 | 31.38 | 88% | – |
| Pokémon Yellow | 1998 | 14.64 | 85% | – |
| Pokémon Gold and Silver | 1999 | 23.70 | 90% | – |
| Pokémon Crystal | 2000 | 6.30 | 80% | – |
| Pokémon Ruby and Sapphire | 2002 | 16.22 | 84% | 82/100 |
| Pokémon FireRed and LeafGreen | 2004 | 16 (Note: includes 12 million GBA and 4 million Nintendo Switch.) | 81% | 81/100 |
| Pokémon Emerald | 2004 | 7.06 | 77% | 76/100 |
| Pokémon Diamond and Pearl | 2006 | 17.67 | 85% | 85/100 |
| Pokémon Platinum | 2008 | 7.69 | 83% | 84/100 |
| Pokémon HeartGold and SoulSilver | 2009 | 12.72 | 88% | 87/100 |
| Pokémon Black and White | 2010 | 15.64 | 86% | 87/100 |
| Pokémon Black 2 and White 2 | 2012 | 8.25 | 81% | 80/100 |
| Pokémon X and Y | 2013 | 16.78 | 87% | 87/100 |
| Pokémon Omega Ruby and Alpha Sapphire | 2014 | 14.67 | 84% | 83/100 |
| Pokémon Sun and Moon | 2016 | 16.33 | 88% | 87/100 |
| Pokémon Ultra Sun and Ultra Moon | 2017 | 9.26 | 83% | 84/100 |
| Pokémon: Let's Go, Pikachu! and Let's Go, Eevee! | 2018 | 15.07 | 78% | 79/100 (Pikachu); 80/100 (Eevee) |
| Pokémon Sword and Shield | 2019 | 27.08 | 83% | 80/100 |
| Pokémon Brilliant Diamond and Shining Pearl | 2021 | 15.06 | – | 73/100 |
| Pokémon Legends: Arceus | 2022 | 15 | – | 83/100 |
| Pokémon Scarlet and Violet | 2022 | 28.08 | – | 72/100 (Scarlet); 71/100 (Violet) |
| Pokémon Legends: Z-A | 2025 | 12.79 | – | 78/100 |

After the first five months of release, the Game Boy games sold almost 3 million copies. They have been credited as a factor in the Game Boy maintaining strong sales in Japan well beyond the typical lifespan of a game system. The series has sold over 279 million units (inclusive of spin-off titles; 210 million for the mainline Pokémon games) as of February 29, 2016, giving it the distinction of being one of the best-selling video game series in history. Guinness World Records awarded the Pokémon series eight records in Guinness World Records: Gamer's Edition 2008, including "Most Successful RPG Series of All Time", "Game Series With the Most Spin-Off Movies" and "Most Photosensitive Epileptic Seizures Caused by a TV Show". As of March 2026, the series has sold over 515 million units.

The Pokémon video game series is the basis of the Pokémon franchise, which includes the Pokémon anime, the Pokémon Trading Card Game, the Pokémon manga, and various toys. The anime series has run for over 1,300 episodes, accompanied by 20 feature films. The trading card game and its expansion sets have grown to around 3,000 unique cards in total, and continue to draw a healthy player base to its official international tournaments. The extent of global toy and merchandise sales since 1996 cover broad markets and high quantities.

IGN ranked Pokémon as the 17th greatest desired game series: "the basic gameplay premise boasts solid, addictive play mechanics, and several of the handheld RPGs deserve to be in every gamer's collection. GamesRadar listed Pokémon as the No. 1 Nintendo game "not made by Nintendo", stating that having to catch each Pokémon made the games addictive.

== See also ==
- Pokémon (TV series)
