= Pokémon Masters EX =

2019 video game

Pokémon Masters Pokémon Masters EX
- Game icon
- Developer: DeNA
- Publisher: DeNA
- Directors: Katsuyuki Shiga; Noriaki Murakami
- Producers: Yu Sasaki; Tetsuya Iguchi
- Designer: Yuichi Kanemori
- Programmer: Kazumitsu Ota
- Artist: Ken Sugimori
- Writers: Koichiro Tsuro; Yuka Sugano; Naoki Muto
- Composers: Haruki Yamada; Shota Kageyama
- Series: Pokémon
- Platforms: Android, iOS
- Release: August 29, 2019 (Note: Due to time zones, the game was released on August 28, 2019 in North America, even though it was released at the same time as the rest of the world. The United States Pokemon.com Archived 2019-09-01 at the Wayback Machine page lists the release date as August 28, while the Pokémon Masters official website Archived 2019-09-01 at the Wayback Machine lists the release date as August 29.)
- Genre: Role-playing
- Modes: Single-player, Co-operative multiplayer

Pokémon Masters EX (Note: Japanese: ポケモンマスターズ EX, Hepburn: Pokemon Masutāzu EX) (originally named Pokémon Masters) is a free-to-play gacha mobile game for Android and iOS developed and published by DeNA. It is based on the Pokémon media franchise. Set on the artificial island of Pasio, the game allows players to battle and recruit various prominent Pokémon Trainers from the main series games and anime. Originally named Pokémon Masters and released in August 2019, it was renamed Pokémon Masters EX in August 2020 on the first anniversary of the game.

== Gameplay ==
There is a Pokémon League tournament of 3-on-3 battles being held on Pasio Island called the Pokémon Masters League. The main goal is to become its Champion. To enter the Pokémon Masters League, players must collect at least five Badges by defeating the PML Leaders located in Pasio. When recruiting most sync pairs, the player can unlock a sync pair story. Players can also participate in limited-time events which are regularly added and updated. Events feature both single-player story events and also co-operative multiplayer events in which players must team up to defeat powerful enemies in order to receive event rewards and prizes.

=== Sync pairs ===
In Pokémon Masters, a sync pair is a pair consisting of one Pokémon Trainer who had previously appeared in the core games (including the Legends games) or the anime series and one Pokémon (usually one that is best associated with that character, e.g. the anime series's main protagonist Ash Ketchum being paired with his partner Pikachu). Each sync pair has one of six roles: the initial three were strike sync pairs, which are focused on attacking (and are either classed under physical or special); support sync pairs, which are focused on defending, restoring health points, and increasing the stats of the whole team; and tech sync pairs, which are focused on different tactics, such as inflicting status effects. August 2023 added two additional roles: sprint sync pairs, which are focused on attacking quickly; and field sync pairs, which are focused on triggering field effects. August 2024 introduced the "multi" role, which is available exclusively to "Arc Suit" variants of certain characters. Sync pairs can be recruited by playing the main story, through scouting or by completing certain timed events. Occasionally, a character will get a variant of themselves (usually to tie in with specific timed events), which usually sees them wearing an alternate costume that also pairs them up with a different Pokémon to which the costume is usually themed, though "variety" Sync Pairs will give characters who play a minor role in core series such as Team Rocket Executives and do not give the character an alternate costume though the character is given a different Pokemon.

== Development and release ==
Pokémon Masters was first announced by The Pokémon Company on May 28, 2019, alongside some other Pokémon games. It represents the first collaboration between the company and mobile game developer DeNA, it had been released for Android and iOS. The concept of the game came from series artist and designer Ken Sugimori who proposed the idea of having all past characters from the main series together in one game.

A preview version of the game was released in Singapore on July 25, 2019, and in Canada on August 6, 2019. The game was released worldwide on August 29, 2019, for iOS and Android phones.

In commemoration of the game's first anniversary, Pokémon Masters was updated with new features as Pokémon Masters EX on August 28, 2020.

== Reception ==
Reception

Aggregate score
Aggregator	Score
Metacritic	63/100

Review score
Publication	Score
Nintendo Life	7/10

Pokémon Masters EX received "mixed or average reviews" according to the review aggregator Metacritic.

Within four days of its global release, Pokémon Masters has been downloaded 10 million times and recorded $10 million in revenue. Within its first week, the revenue figures were increased to $26 million. In its first month, the game generated $33 million in revenue and $75 million within its first year.
