= Twitch Plays Pokémon =

Social experiment and channel on Twitch

Commands identified by the game engine shown on-screen (right of image) are applied to the player character in Pokémon Red (left).

Twitch Plays Pokémon (TPP) is a social experiment and channel on the video game live streaming website Twitch, consisting of a crowdsourced attempt to play Game Freak's and Nintendo's Pokémon video games by parsing commands sent by users through the channel's chat room. It holds the Guinness World Record for having "the most users to input a command to play a live streamed videogame" with 1,165,140 participants.

The concept was developed by an anonymous Australian programmer and launched on 12 February 2014, starting with the game Pokémon Red. The stream became unexpectedly popular, reaching an average concurrent viewership of over 80,000 viewers (with at least 10% participating). On 1 March 2014, the game was completed after more than 16 continuous days of gameplay; Twitch estimated that over 1.16 million people participated, with peak simultaneous participation at 121,000, and with a total of 55 million views during the experiment. On 5 December 2014, Twitch Plays Pokémon received a Game Award in the "Best Fan Creation" category.

The experiment was met with attention by media outlets and staff members of Twitch for its interactivity, its erratic and chaotic nature, the unique challenges faced by players due to the mechanics of its system, and the community and memes developed by participants. Twitch as a company used the experiment to explore how they could make streaming more interactive for viewers and expand their offerings. Following the completion of Red, the broadcaster continued the channel with many other games in the Pokémon series along with unofficial ROM hacks. The broadcaster has plans to continue with other Pokémon games as long as there remains interest in the channel. The success of the experiment led to a number of similar Twitch-based streams for other games, and led Twitch to promote more streams with similar interactivity with watchers.

== Premise ==
Inspired by another Twitch-based interactive game, Salty Bet (a website where users can wager fake money on the outcome of randomized M.U.G.E.N. matches), and described as a social experiment, the system used by the stream was coded by an anonymous Australian programmer, colloquially known as the "Streamer", consisting of an IRC bot written in Python and the Game Boy emulator VisualBoyAdvance. The script captures specific case-insensitive messages (directional commands, "B", "A", "select", and "start") sent into the stream's chat room by users, and sends them to the emulator as button input, thus controlling the game. An additional web app coded using JavaScript is used to display a live tally of moves that are shown within the stream. The Streamer chose Pokémon Red and Blue for the project, citing nostalgia for the early games, the fact that "Even when played very poorly it is difficult not to make progress in Pokémon", and because its current control structure "[wouldn't] work with any genre that isn't a JRPG", particularly targeting its "forgiving" turn-based structure and lack of reaction-based gameplay, compensating for the large amount of input lag between the game and the stream. The Streamer used an edited version of the game, which claims to make all the original 151 Pokémon accessible, in hopes of making completion of the Pokédex a possibility. However, the edited version used was unfinished and has no gameplay differences when compared to the original game.

The erratic nature of the control scheme has made the game longer and harder to play than under normal circumstances. An Ars Technica writer commented that "[Red] gets stuck in corners. He walks in circles, compulsively checking his Pokédex and saving over and over again. Commands stream in from the chat channel faster than the game can possibly process them, making progress difficult-to-impossible even without the lag factor or the 'help' of gleeful trolls." Recurring difficulties have occurred with areas of the game involving mazes and ledges (areas with the latter taking as long as several hours to navigate due to users intentionally sending "down" commands to jump off the ledges), the accidental release (permanent deletion) of several Pokémon (including an incident referred to as "Bloody Sunday," where a total of twelve Pokémon were accidentally released whilst trying to obtain a Zapdos from the PC), and users repeatedly sending "start" commands to open the pause menu, often followed by opening the character's inventory to select random items. A system to throttle inputs on the Start button was added to mitigate this particular effect.

Despite the seemingly erratic process of playing the game, players have attempted to collaborate and strategize through various means, including infographics and a user script which hides command messages from the chat window to allow conversation. This was necessary for the players to progress as several areas of the game require coordinated actions to gain Pokémon with a specific skill needed to clear obstacles in Red's way, and earlier attempts without such coordination resulted in missing out on specific opportunities early on in the playthrough. In essence, the majority of players have attempted to counteract trolls trying to impede progress. A computer program was even created to automatically identify these trolls.

The Streamer has since collaborated with others to continue preparing tools for the games for the Twitch channel. This group had added live commentary on the games as they were played. As a result of intra-group hostility from some of the collaborators, the Streamer stepped down from his role as lead for Twitch Plays Pokémon on 22 November 2017, and gave control to another collaborator.

== Progression and further games ==
On 18 February 2014, after encountering major difficulties with a puzzle in the Team Rocket hideout, a new mechanic was introduced in an effort to make the game easier to play, Democracy mode. On introduction it initially made all movements subject to a vote: all inputs received over a period of time (usually 30 seconds) were tallied, and the winning command would be executed at the end of that time. Users could also append numbers to their movements to specify the length of the motion, such as "right3" to mean three consecutive "right" inputs. Many people were outraged over this new system and protest broke out in the Twitch chat, many of them using the command "start9" (which would open and close the pause menu (pressing START) nine times to slow down progress) to fight the system. This became known as "The start9 protests." The broadcaster later reworked the mechanic so that users could vote to switch between two modes: "Anarchy", the previous default, and this new mode "Democracy." However, a change to Democracy mode requires a supermajority vote, while a change to Anarchy mode requires only a majority vote, as indicated by an on-screen meter. This change was considered divisive by players, who believed that Democracy mode conflicted with the original concept of the stream and eliminated the potential for randomness which had helped to drive the elaborate narrative and mythology that had built up around the playthrough.

Following the completion of the Red version, a new game began on 2 March 2014, this time with the second generation game Pokémon Crystal. The developer set a deadline for the completion of Crystal with the plan to start the Emerald version on a fixed date, though the players were able to complete the Crystal version well before this point. With the change to Crystal also came a change to the voting system; the Democracy mode was automatically activated at the top of each hour. By 14 March 2014, players had reached a major battle on Mt. Silver against Red, a trainer representing the player-character from the Red and Blue versions; however, the game was also modified so that Red's team would consist of the same Pokémon that were used to beat the Elite Four in the playthrough of the Red version earlier. The developer stated that he intentionally changed the game data of the Crystal version to behave in this way, as it was Game Freak's original intent when creating the game that the player would face Red in the Crystal version using the party they had finished Red with. the Crystal version was beaten on 15 March, with more than 13 days of playtime. The developer stated that even though fewer viewers watched Pokémon Crystal compared to Pokémon Red, he will continue the stream with other Pokémon games as long as there remains interest in the experiment.

The Emerald version was started on 21 March 2014. With the shift to Emerald, the Democracy mode was initially disabled entirely. Emerald was repeatedly restarted due to its soft reset ability, but was later fixed by the broadcaster.

The shift to Pokémon X—the 1st installment in the franchise for the Nintendo 3DS, brought changes to the stream's setup. As there was no PC-based emulator for the 3DS at the time, the stream was conducted on actual hardware using a hard-mod known as the 3DS Streaming Console with External Control Interface (3xtDS); developed by Reddit user dekuNukem, also known as Twitch_plays_3ds (who has also designed an automated rig for "chaining" and detecting "shiny" Pokémon), the mod allows direct control of inputs on the device via a USB-based interface, and added the video output required for capturing the screens' content. The change to native hardware also allowed the stream to use the Wi-Fi capabilities of the device; other players of Pokémon X and Y could directly interact with the stream's player via Nintendo Network and the game's internet-enabled features, such as online battles, trades, and O-Powers. Following its release, Pokémon Omega Ruby was also played in the stream.

In honour of the one-year anniversary of the original run, a new playing of the Red version began in February 2015. The goal was to complete the game's main storyline and to catch all 151 Pokémon (complete the Pokédex), the latter which they did in around 39 days.

To celebrate the project's fourth anniversary, the channel started a new playthrough of both the Red and Blue versions simultaneously. Players in the Twitch channel can specify which game their command is for, but otherwise commands are issues alternating between the two games, and when the game's democratic mode is on, the command voted on is used in both games.

As the experiment moved into its fifth year, having exhausted all the official games, the channel began using more fan-created mods of them.

In honor of running for six years straight, the stream ran a gauntlet of six games in a row.

== Viewership ==
Launched on 12 February 2014 as a "proof of concept", the stream was relatively inactive for the first day and a half of playing. However, the stream quickly went viral after that, reaching a total viewership of around 175,000 by 14 February (when players managed to beat the first of eight Gym leaders). By 17 February, the channel had reached over 6.5 million total views. By 20 February, the channel had over 17 million total views, and was averaging concurrent viewership between 60 and 70 thousand viewers with at least 10% participating. By then, the players had managed to catch 12 different species of Pokémon, and made it past the fourth gym. On the completion of Red, the channel had reached 36 million total views, with a peak concurrent viewership of 120,000, and an estimated 658,000 had participated. The Red stream was eventually recognized by the Guinness World Records for having "the most users to input a command to play a live streamed videogame" with 1,165,140. The large amount of activity on the stream resulted in "enormous (and unforeseen) stress" on Twitch's chat system, requiring the site's engineers to move the stream's chat to a higher-capacity server normally used during major e-sports events, while working on improving the infrastructure's scalability. The developer himself said, "I didn't think it was going to be this popular, I thought it would gain only a small group of dedicated viewers and many others would check it out briefly before moving on to other things. It's overwhelming how popular it has become."

== Community ==
An active community of players also emerged on communities and social networks such as Reddit, which have liveblogged the proceedings and developed memes and other works around occurrences in the game. One item in Red's inventory from the start of the game was the Helix Fossil, which was used later in the game to revive Omanyte, but is otherwise functionless. The Helix Fossil was selected so frequently that it became an inside joke among players, and at times humorously calling it a deity which the player-character was constantly consulting for advice, and it quickly became the players' "religion". Players went as far as treating the fossil as a symbol representing a sect which supports Anarchy mode, while treating its counterpart, the Dome Fossil (which revives Kabuto), as a deity to those who support Democracy mode. Fans published "bibles" for the Helix religion.

Certain Pokémon captured by Red during the gameplay have also gained fan followings. Two Pokémon that were obtained early in the game, and then later accidentally released were the Charmeleon and Rattata, "ABBBBBBK(" and "JLVWNNOOOO", further nicknamed "Abby" and "Jay Leno". The team's Pidgeot, one of the highest level Pokémon in the group and often successful in battles, was named "Bird Jesus" by the community; concurrently, the team's Zapdos was nicknamed "AA-j" but referred to as "Archangel of Justice" or "Anarchy Bird". Their Flareon was dubbed the "False Prophet", as players had accidentally obtained it instead of Vaporeon, which was needed so they could teach it the "Surf" move needed to travel on water, and it had later caused the release of the Charmeleon and Rattata. During the eleventh day of the event (23 February), which fell on a Sunday, the players inadvertently released a dozen of the captured Pokémon, effectively deleting the creatures from the game, an event that later became known as "Bloody Sunday". The practice of nicknames continued into Crystal, which included a new Pidgeot nicknamed "Brian", and a Feraligatr nicknamed "Lazorgator".

== Reception ==
Media outlets have described the proceedings of the game as being "mesmerizing," "miraculous," and "beautiful chaos," with one viewer comparing it to "watching a car crash in slow motion." Ars Technica felt that it encapsulated "the best and worst qualities of our user-driven, novelty-hungry age," providing hours of arguable time-wasting entertainment through a word-of-mouth viral distribution. The stream has been compared to the infinite monkey theorem in that effectively random input to a game still ultimately comes out with forward progress in the game. Twitch vice president of marketing Matthew DiPietro praised the stream, considering it "one more example of how video games have become a platform for entertainment and creativity that extends WAY beyond the original intent of the game creator. By merging a video game, live video and a participatory experience, the broadcaster has created an entertainment hybrid custom made for the Twitch community. This is a wonderful proof of concept that we hope to see more of in the future."

== Legacy ==
Twitch Plays Pokémon has also inspired imitators with other video games, such as Pokémon Blue, QWOP, Tetris (including one which used the actual command inputs from the original Twitch Plays Pokémon stream), Street Fighter II, Halo: Combat Evolved (itself made significantly difficult by its nature as a first-person shooter), Metal Gear: Ghost Babel, Dark Souls, Fallout 3, PlayerUnknown's Battlegrounds, Teamfight Tactics, The Legend of Zelda: Breath of the Wild, Pokémon Go (which used location spoofing to simulate the movement of a real person in response to viewers' commands), and Microsoft Flight Simulator. Similar Twitch Plays have been used for taking care of a virtual pet Tamagotchi, and installing Arch Linux onto a virtual machine through text commands entered one letter at a time. Inspired by this last application, another experimental "Stock Stream" was started in May 2017 to allow Twitch viewers to vote every five minutes on the trading of stocks on the New York Stock Exchange from an initial $50,000 fund provided by the stream's developer, placing some rules to avoid triggering any financial regulations. A similar approach using Twitter, with the Twitter's user icon serving as the game's output and user commands taken from tweets sent to the account, was launched in January 2021 using Pokémon Red.

The term "crowdplay" has been ascribed to similar games where the actions of the crowd directly influence the gameplay. tinyBuild used the "Twitch Plays" model to release Punch Club, holding back release of the game until either a preset date or completion of the game running via a public "Twitch Plays" stream. Punch Club later added the ability for viewers to bet on in-game fights using virtual Twitch currency, following a similar betting model used by Oxeye Game Systems for Cobalt. Telltale Games premiered a new "crowd play" feature for its adventure games starting with its 2016 Batman game, allowing stream viewers to vote on selected decisions within the game. In January 2016, Twitch created a specialized directory for various "Twitch Plays" streams, with their VP of Developer Success Kathy Astromoff stating that the company has recognized the growth of similar experiments, and enabling such experiments to be easily found by its userbase. Further, in March 2016, Twitch announced a new "stream first" initiative to help developers create games that are aimed for integration of streaming and chat atop more traditional gameplay, basing the format on the prior success of Twitch Plays Pokemon streams. Amazon.com, which acquired Twitch in 2014, developed the Amazon Lumberyard game engine that includes direct support for Twitch streaming to allow viewers to influence games via the associated chat, taking cues from the popularity of "Twitch Plays".

Another homage, Fish Plays Pokémon, surfaced in August 2014 as part of a hackNY hackathon. The stream, which consists of a fishcam in which the position of a betta fish in a fish bowl is used to control Pokémon Red, peaked around 20,000 concurrent viewers. Yet another homage, called π Plays Pokémon, maps every digit between 0 and 9 to a button on the Game Boy Advance and sends an input to Pokémon Sapphire every second, echoing the idea that the mathematical constant pi is conjectured to be a normal number. On February 25, 2025, Anthropic started streaming Claude Plays Pokemon, a homage in which Claude plays Pokémon Red.

A Helix Fossil emote with the shortcut "PraiseIt" was later made available as a Twitch chat emote in celebration of the original Pokémon Red run.

On March 1, 2024, the official Pokémon Instagram account posted a video of various Omastar and Omanyte to commemorate the 10th anniversary of the original run's completion.

== Game completion ==
Season	Game	Start	Completed	Completion time	Notes
Season 1	Pokémon Red version	12 February 2014	1 March 2014	16 days, 7 hours, 50 minutes, 19 seconds	
Season 1	Pokémon Crystal version	2 March 2014	15 March 2014	13 days, 2 hours, 2 minutes, 55 seconds	Uses a modded version, with 251 species of Pokémon available and the final boss Red's team consisting of the same team from Twitch Plays Pokémon Red.
Season 1	Pokémon Emerald version	21 March 2014	11 April 2014	20 days, 21 hours, 55 minutes, 41 seconds	
Season 1	Pokémon (Randomized) FireRed version	11 April 2014	27 April 2014	15 days, 2 hours, 1 minute, 54 seconds	Used a modded version with a pseudorandom number generator to change the predetermined Pokémon, items, and moves.
Season 1	Pokémon Platinum version	2 May 2014	20 May 2014	17 days, 11 hours, 38 minutes, 47 seconds	
Season 1	Pokémon (Randomized) HeartGold version	23 May 2014	12 June 2014	18 days, 20 hours, 33 minutes, 51 seconds	Used a modded version with a pseudorandom number generator to change the predetermined Pokémon, items, and moves.
Season 1	Pokémon Black version	15 June 2014	27 June 2014	12 days, 18 hours, 34 minutes, 59 seconds	
Season 1	Pokémon Blaze Black 2	6 July 2014	22 July 2014	19 days, 2 hours, 15 minutes, 37 seconds	Used a ROM hack of Pokémon Black 2 called Pokémon Blaze Black 2 and featured the ability to obtain all Pokémon available within Generation V as well as other gameplay tweaks.
Season 1	Pokémon X	27 July 2014	1 August 2014	5 days, 5 hours, 44 seconds	
Season 1	Pokémon Omega Ruby	22 November 2014	29 November 2014	8 days, 13 hours, 29 minutes	
Season 2	Pokémon Anniversary Red	12 February 2015	23 March 2015	39 days, 19 hours, 27 minutes, 12 seconds	Used a modded, more difficult version which makes all 151 species available; goal is to complete the Pokédex.
Season 2	Pokémon Vietnamese Crystal	23 March 2015	10 November 2015	37 weeks, 3 days, 3 hours, 21 minutes	A bootleg version of Pokémon Crystal. This version is notorious among Pokémon fans for its rampant mistranslations. Unlike previous games, this version was not played constantly and instead was interspersed between Pokémon Battle Revolution matches.
Season 2	Touhou Puppet Play 1.8 Enhanced	10 May 2015	24 May 2015	13 days, 15 hours, 44 minutes	Uses two modded versions of Pokémon FireRed at once known as Touhou Puppet Play 1.8 Enhanced which uses characters from the Touhou Project game series in place of Pokémon is utilized, as well as the hack Moémon. Both were being completed simultaneously.
Season 2	Moémon	10 May 2015	24 May 2015	13 days, 15 hours, 44 minutes	Uses two modded versions of Pokémon FireRed at once known as Touhou Puppet Play 1.8 Enhanced which uses characters from the Touhou Project game series in place of Pokémon is utilized, as well as the hack Moémon. Both were being completed simultaneously.
Season 2	Pokémon Randomized Alpha Sapphire	12 July 2015	26 July 2015	14 days, 1 hour, 17 minutes	Used a modded version with a pseudorandom number generator to change the predetermined Pokémon, items, and moves. Super Smash Bros. for Wii U matches, played by computer AIs, were streamed alongside the Alpha Sapphire playthrough.
Season 2	Pokémon Colosseum	12 October 2015	18 October 2015	6 days 3 hours, 27 minutes	
Season 2	Pokémon XD: Gale of Darkness	12 December 2015	20 December 2015	8 days 4 hours 9 minutes	
Season 2	Pokémon Trading Card Game	20 December 2015	13 February 2016	7 weeks, 6 days, 25 minutes, 6 seconds	Similarly to Pokémon Vietnamese Crystal, this game was played intermittently throughout Pokémon Battle Revolution. The game was completed during the Anniversary Crystal intermission.
Season 2	Pokémon Trading Card Game 2	13 February 2016	8 April 2016	7 weeks, 6 days	Started during the pre-Anniversary Crystal intermission. Finished during post-Anniversary Crystal intermission.
Season 3	Pokémon Anniversary Crystal	14 February 2016	16 March 2016	30 days, 4 hours, 33 minutes	Similar to Anniversary Red in which a modded version is used and it's required to catch all Pokémon to complete the game.
Season 3	Pokémon Mystery Dungeon: Red Rescue Team	12 February 2016	27 January 2017	50 weeks, 2 hours, 24 minutes	Played as a sidegame both alongside Pokémon Battle Revolution and other runs. It was temporarily replaced by Pokémon Ultra.
Season 3	Pokémon Brown	16 June 2016	27 June 2016	11 days, 2 hours	One of the original serious ROM hacks based on Pokémon Red.
Season 3	Pokémon Randomized Platinum	31 July 2016	16 August 2016	15 days, 4 hours, 2 minutes	Used a modded version with a pseudorandom number generator to change the predetermined Pokémon, items, and moves.
Season 3	Pokémon Ultra	16 August 2016	28 October 2016	10 weeks, 3 days, 11 hours, 41 minutes	A ROM hack based on Pokémon Leaf Green. Like Pokémon Vietnamese Crystal and the Pokémon Trading Card Game before it, it is a sidegame and is played between Pokémon Battle Revolution matches.
Season 3	Pokémon Prism	9 October 2016	26 October 2016	16 days, 23 hours, 18 minutes	The sequel to Pokémon Brown. It debuted on TPP after being in development for almost eight years.
Season 3	Pokémon Sun	18 November 2016	2 December 2016	13 days, 22 hours	
Season 3	Pokémon Waning Moon	13 January 2017	26 January 2017	13 days, 11 hours, 37 minutes	Used a modded, more difficult version of Pokémon Moon.
Season 4	Pokémon Chatty Yellow	12 February 2017	24 February 2017	11 days, 19 hours	The third anniversary run. Uses a modified version of Pokémon Yellow centered around Chatot, which utilizes scripting to take quotes from users in the chat to replace in-game dialogue in real time.
Season 4	Pokémon Dark Graystone	24 February 2017	13 March 2017	2 weeks, 3 days, 4 hours, 4 minutes, 57 seconds	Uses a modified version of Pokémon Gold. Played as a sidegame like VC and Ultra.
Season 4	Pokémon Ash Gray	13 March 2017	29 September 2017	28 weeks, 4 days, 28 minutes, 6 seconds	Uses a modified version of Pokémon FireRed based on the events of the Pokémon anime. Played as a sidegame.
Season 4	Pokémon Blazed Glazed	8 April 2017	25 April 2017	16 days, 16 hours	Uses a modified version of an existing modified version of Pokémon Emerald, known as Pokémon Glazed.
Season 4	Pokémon Randomized White 2	3 June 2017	20 June 2017	16 days, 18 hours, 11 minutes	Used a modded version with a pseudorandom number generator to change the predetermined Pokémon, items, and moves.
Season 4	Pokémon Pyrite	12 August 2017	26 August 2017	14 days, 7 hours, 58 minutes	Uses a modified version of Pokémon Crystal featuring increased difficulty and other changes.
Season 4	Pokémon Theta Emerald EX	30 September 2017	15 October 2017	15 days	A modified version of Pokémon Emerald which features increased difficulty, 721 Pokémon as well as various other changes from later generations.
Season 4	Pokémon Green	15 October 2017	13 April 2018	25 weeks, 5 days, 3 hours, 45 minutes, 36 seconds	Badly translated bootleg. Played as a sidegame.
Season 4	Pokémon Ultra Sun	25 November 2017	8 December 2017	13 days, 4 hours, 7 minutes	
Season 5	Pokémon Red and Blue	12 February 2018	27 February 2018	14 days, 1 hour, 50 minutes	A dual run in which Pokémon Red and Pokémon Blue are played simultaneously. Unlike the previous dual run, inputs are split between the two games and users can choose to input specifically for one game or let it alternate between them.
Season 5	Pokémon Storm Silver	14 April 2018	4 May 2018	19 days, 3 hours	A romhack of Pokémon SoulSilver in which all Pokémon from up to the fourth generation are available as well as various other minor changes.
Season 5	Pokémon Sweet	4 May 2018	10 February 2019	40 weeks, 1 day, 23 hours, 56 minutes, 23 seconds	A romhack of Pokémon FireRed with "candified" Pokémon known as PokéSweets. Played as a sidegame.
Season 5	Pokémon Bronze	9 June 2018	18 June 2018	8 days, 8 hours, 21 minutes	A romhack of Pokémon Gold.
Season 5	Pokémon Randomized Y	11 August 2018	26 August 2018	14 days, 11 hours, 26 minutes	Used a modded version with a pseudorandom number generator to change the predetermined Pokémon, items, and moves.
Season 5	Detective Pikachu	8 September 2018	10 September 2018	1 day, 22 hours, 47 minutes	
Season 5	Pokémon Flora Sky	13 October 2018	29 October 2018	16 days, 2 hours, 42 minutes	A romhack of Pokémon Emerald featuring an original story and Pokémon from the fourth and fifth generations.
Season 5	Hypno's Lullaby	30 October 2018	12 November 2018	1 week, 5 days, 23 hours, 55 minutes, 43 seconds	A romhack of Pokémon FireRed based on the creepypasta, Hypno's Lullaby. Played as a sidegame.
Season 5	Pokémon Crystal Randofuser	8 December 2018	19 December 2018	10 days, 9 hours, 1 minute	A romhack of Pokémon Crystal which fuses different Pokémon together.
Season 6	Pokémon Burning Red	12 February 2019	22 February 2019	9 days, 13 hours, 33 minutes	Used a romhack with the ability to switch between Pokémon Red and Pokémon FireRed. Pokémon, money and most items are transferred between both games.
Season 6	Pokémon Gold Space World Demo	2 March 2019	30 March 2019	4 weeks, 23 hours, 33 minutes, 15 seconds	An early demo of Pokémon Gold that was playable at Nintendo Space World 1997 featuring Pokémon that are unused in the final game. Played as a sidegame.
Season 6	Pokémon Metronome Sapphire	31 March 2019	19 December 2019	8 months, 19 days	Uses a modded version with a pseudorandom number generator to change the predetermined Pokémon and sets them all to Level 100 with only the move Metronome. Ended as a full-run and continues as a sidegame as of 3 April 2019.
Season 6	Pokémon Volt White	13 April 2019	25 April 2019	11 days, 21 hours, 16 minutes	A romhack of Pokémon White featuring all Pokémon from the fifth generation available as well as various other changes.
Season 6	Pokémon Randomized Colosseum	8 June 2019	15 June 2019	6 days, 5 hours, 34 minutes, 21 seconds	Used a modded version with a pseudorandom number generator to change the predetermined Pokémon, items, and moves.
Season 6	Pokémon XG: NeXt Gen	13 July 2019	21 July 2019	8 days, 1 hour, 40 minutes	A romhack of Pokémon XD: Gale of Darkness.
Season 6	Pokémon TriHard Emerald	10 August 2019	20 August 2019	9 days, 21 hours, 34 minutes	A romhack of Pokémon Emerald where defeated Pokémon are permanently removed from the party, similar to a Nuzlocke Challenge. The main difference being that upon loss of a battle, the game reverses to a previous save. Meaning that removed Pokémon can technically be restored at the cost of a loss of progress.
Season 6	Pokémon Randomized Ultra Moon	12 October 2019	23 October 2019	10 days, 16 hours, 2 minutes, 17 seconds	Used a modded version with a pseudorandom number generator to change the predetermined Pokémon, items, and moves.
Season 6	Pokémon Sword	23 November 2019	1 December 2019	7 days, 23 hours, 57 minutes	
Season 6	Pokémon NavyBlue	1 December 2019	Ongoing	TBD	A romhack of Pokémon FireRed played as a sidegame.
Season 7	Pokémon Gauntlet Red	13 February 2020	19 February 2020	6 days, 18 hours, 43 minutes	The Gauntlet is a rerun of most of the games played during Season 1 played one after the other.
Season 7	Pokémon Gauntlet Crystal	23 February 2020	3 March 2020	8 days, 16 hours, 19 minutes, 43 seconds	The Gauntlet is a rerun of most of the games played during Season 1 played one after the other.
Season 7	Pokémon Gauntlet Emerald	7 March 2020	18 March 2020	11 days, 20 hours, 10 minutes, 15 seconds	The Gauntlet is a rerun of most of the games played during Season 1 played one after the other.
Season 7	Pokémon Gauntlet Platinum	28 March 2020	5 April 2020	8 days, 14 hours	The Gauntlet is a rerun of most of the games played during Season 1 played one after the other.
Season 7	Pokémon Gauntlet Blaze Black 2	12 April 2020	27 April 2020	14 days	The Gauntlet is a rerun of most of the games played during Season 1 played one after the other.
Season 7	Pokémon Gauntlet X	3 May 2020	10 May 2020	7 days, 5 seconds	The Gauntlet is a rerun of most of the games played during Season 1 played one after the other.
Season 7	Pokémon Lightning Sapphire	5 May 2020	10 December 2020	30 weeks, 2 days, 22 hours, 38 minutes, 3 seconds	A bad translation of Pokémon Sapphire. Was the final sidegame before a vote to remove them.
Season 7	Pokémon Sirius	13 June 2020	23 June 2020	10 days, 1 hour, 12 minutes, 54 seconds	A romhack of Pokémon Emerald and the prequel to Pokémon Vega.
Season 7	Pokémon Rising Ruby	8 August 2020	21 August 2020	12 days, 22 hours, 16 minutes	A romhack of Pokémon Omega Ruby including higher difficulty and all sixth generation Pokémon obtainable.
Season 7	Pokémon Vega	12 December 2020	25 December 2020	12 days, 11 hours, 14 minutes	A romhack of Pokémon Emerald and the sequel to Pokémon Sirius.
Season 8	Pokémon Chatty Crystal	14 February 2021	8 March 2021	21 days, 3 hours, 40 minutes	The seventh anniversary run. Uses a modified version of Pokémon Crystal centered around Unown and Chatot, which utilizes scripting to take quotes from users in the chat to replace in-game dialogue in real time.
Season 8	Pokémon Renegade Platinum	10 April 2021	21 April 2021	10 days, 19 hours, 50 minutes	A romhack of Pokémon Platinum including higher difficulty, balance changes and all generation IV Pokémon obtainable.
Season 8	Pokémon Green	8 May 2021	10 May 2021	1 day, 3 hours, 32 minutes, 15 seconds	A collaboration between two other Twitch Plays streams in which they raced to see who could complete Pokémon Green, Pokémon Blue and Pokémon Red respectively. TwitchPlaysPokémon played Pokémon Green and came in first. TwitchPlaysPaperMario played Pokémon Blue and came in second. TwitchPlaysSpeedruns played Pokémon Red and came in last.
Season 8	Pokémon Blue	8 May 2021	10 May 2021	1 day, 7 hours, 22 minutes, 42 seconds	A collaboration between two other Twitch Plays streams in which they raced to see who could complete Pokémon Green, Pokémon Blue and Pokémon Red respectively. TwitchPlaysPokémon played Pokémon Green and came in first. TwitchPlaysPaperMario played Pokémon Blue and came in second. TwitchPlaysSpeedruns played Pokémon Red and came in last.
Season 8	Pokémon Red	8 May 2021	10 May 2021	1 day, 11 hours, 3 minutes, 13 seconds	A collaboration between two other Twitch Plays streams in which they raced to see who could complete Pokémon Green, Pokémon Blue and Pokémon Red respectively. TwitchPlaysPokémon played Pokémon Green and came in first. TwitchPlaysPaperMario played Pokémon Blue and came in second. TwitchPlaysSpeedruns played Pokémon Red and came in last.
Season 8	Dragon Ball Z Team Training	13 May 2021	N/A	TBD	A romhack of Pokémon FireRed featuring characters from the Dragon Ball Z anime series in place of Pokémon. Played as a sidegame.
Season 8	Pokémon Randomized Black	3 July 2021	12 July 2021	8 days, 4 hours, 56 minutes	A romhack of Pokémon Platinum including higher difficulty, balance changes and all generation IV Pokémon obtainable.
Season 8	Pokémon Randomized Black 2	12 July 2021	29 July 2021	17 days, 7 hours, 35 minutes	Used a modded version with a pseudorandom number generator to change the predetermined Pokémon, items, and moves.
Season 8	Pokémon Emerald	13 August 2021	17 August 2021	3 days, 9 hours, 48 minutes, 21 seconds	
Season 8	Pokémon Blazing Emerald	21 August 2021	N/A	N/A	A romhack of Pokémon Emerald.

From Platinum to Black 2, the stream showed a second game, Pokémon Stadium 2, alongside the main game. Unlike other games, inputs for Stadium 2 were chosen at random and were not controlled by the chat. Instead, players on the chat were given virtual currency that could be used to place bets on the outcome of Stadium 2 matches. After Pokémon X concluded on 1 August 2014, a similar system was implemented, with Pokémon Battle Revolution taking the place of Stadium 2, as it added more features such as better graphics. This time, instead of inputs being entirely random, players who bet on the current match could vote on which move would be used by their team each turn; the system would randomly choose one of the bettors' choices, but players who had placed higher bets had a higher chance of their move being chosen. The developer has created a modded version of Pokémon Battle Revolution known as Pokémon Battle Revolution 2.0. It is meant to fix glitches and add various improvements such as additional battle arenas. During the interim, the stream showed Harvest Moon GB, Pokkén Tournament, EarthBound, Robopon Sun, and save states of the first four runs in reverse order.

In addition, an extra game is showcased to the side of any game currently being played. This game is a romhack of Pokémon Pinball dubbed simply Pokémon Pinball Generations, which adds two new boards based on the second generation of Pokémon. As such, all Pokémon from Generation II are now obtainable in-game, and Pokémon badges are awarded randomly when a Pokémon is caught during a Pinball playthrough.

== See also ==
- Slow television
