= Shigeki Morimoto =

Japanese video game designer

- 森本 茂樹
- Born: October 1, 1967 (age 58); Japan
- Occupations: Video game designer, director, programmer
- Years active: 1993–present
- Employer: Game Freak
- Notable work: Pokémon

Shigeki Morimoto (Japanese: 森本 茂樹, Hepburn: Morimoto Shigeki, born October 1, 1967) is a game designer and programmer currently working at Game Freak. He has been involved in nearly every main series Pokémon game, since Pokémon Red and Blue Versions where he was a programmer, and the creator of the battle system and the Pokémon "Mew". Since then, he has served as the director of more recent games in the series.

== Games ==
Year	Game	Position
1993	Mario & Wario	Map design
1996	Pokémon Red and Green	Programmer, monster design
1996	Pokémon Blue	Programmer, monster design
1997	Bushi Seiryūden: Futari no Yūsha	Map design, balancing
1998	Pocket Monsters Stadium	Character design
1998	Pokémon Yellow	Programmer
1999	Pokémon Gold and Silver	Programmer, game design, monster design
2000	Pokémon Crystal	Programmer, game design, monster design
2000	Pokémon Stadium 2	Character design, advisor
2002	Pokémon Ruby & Sapphire	Battle director, game design, pokemon design, parameter design
2003	Pokémon Colosseum	Advisor
2004	Pokémon FireRed and LeafGreen	Battle director, game design, pokemon design
2004	Pokémon Emerald	Director, game design, pokemon design, parameter design
2005	Pokémon XD: Gale of Darkness	Advisor
2006	Pokémon Diamond and Pearl	Battle director, parameter design
2006	Pokémon Battle Revolution	Advisor
2008	Pokémon Platinum	Game design, parameter design
2009	Pokémon HeartGold and SoulSilver	Director, parameter design
2010	Pokémon Black and White	Lead battle design, parameter design
2013	Pokémon X and Y	Lead battle design
2016	Pokémon Sun and Moon	Lead battle design
2017	Pokémon Ultra Sun and Ultra Moon	Battle design
2019	Little Town Hero	Supervisor
2019	Pokémon Sword and Shield	Lead battle design
2022	Pokémon Scarlet and Violet	Battle logic planning
