= Pokémon Colosseum =

2003 video game

- North American cover art. Clockwise from top: Wes, Kyogre, Raikou, Suicune, Entei, and Groudon.
- Developer: Genius Sonority
- Publishers: JP: The Pokémon Company; WW: Nintendo
- Director: Manabu Yamana
- Producers: Gakuji Nomoto; Hiroyuki Jinnai; Hiroaki Tsuru; Kenji Miki; Shigeru Miyamoto
- Designers: Kazunori Orio; Gakuji Nomoto; Akihiko Miura; Sayaka Yamazaki; Ryota Aomi; Chiharu Sugaya; Kōji Ōno
- Programmer: Masayuki Kawamoto
- Artist: Shinichi Hiromoto
- Writer: Kazunori Orio
- Composer: Tsukasa Tawada
- Series: Pokémon
- Platform: GameCube
- Release: JP: November 21, 2003; NA: March 22, 2004; EU: May 14, 2004
- Genre: Role-playing
- Modes: Single-player, multiplayer

Pokémon Colosseum (Note: ポケモンコロシアム (Pokemon Koroshiamu)) is a role-playing video game developed by Genius Sonority and published by The Pokémon Company and Nintendo for the GameCube. A spin-off of the Pokémon series, it was released on November 21, 2003, in Japan, March 22, 2004, in North America and May 14, 2004, in Europe. Unlike previous titles' random encounters with Pokémon, Colosseum allows the player to steal ("snag") the Pokémon of other Pokémon Trainers. The game also features single-player and multiplayer battle modes.

Set in the desert region of Orre, the player controls Wes, a former member of Team Snagem. Throughout the game, Wes rescues "Shadow Pokémon"—Pokémon who have had their hearts darkened by Team Cipher, an antagonistic organization—via snagging. Rui, a non-player character, serves as Wes's sidekick and identifies Shadow Pokémon.

Pokémon Colosseum was exhibited at E3 2003 and featured Pokémon models ported from the Nintendo 64's Pokémon Stadium and Pokémon Stadium 2. North American pre-orders included a bonus disc that allows the player to download the Pokémon Jirachi on the Game Boy Advance titles Pokémon Ruby and Sapphire while Japanese bonus discs featured similar downloads for Celebi and Pikachu. Upon release, the game was a critical and commercial success, with praise directed at its graphics and music. It sold 1.15 million copies in the United States and 656,270 in Japan. Pokémon, Colosseum Sold a total of 2.41 million copies worldwide. A successor, Pokémon XD: Gale of Darkness, released for the GameCube in 2005. Pokémon Colosseum will be made available on the Nintendo Switch 2 through the Nintendo Classics service.

== Gameplay ==
The main character's Sceptile and Metagross battle against the opponent's Taillow and Hoothoot on Mt. Battle, a common setting for battles.

Pokémon Colosseum is a 3D role-playing game viewed from a third-person perspective. The player, controlling a Pokémon Trainer named Wes (default name), moves through various towns and other locations (traversed using a type of one-wheeled motorcycle), battling enemy Trainers and completing quests. Items are purchased at "Pokémon Mart" locations using the game's currency, "Pokémon Dollars" ( (Note: Distinct from the Russian ruble sign: ₽.)). When a battle starts, the screen switches to a turn-based interface where the player's and enemies' Pokémon fight. Most battles use the "double battle" format, involving two Pokémon on each side at one time. However, each Trainer can carry up to six Pokémon at one time, so once a Pokémon is defeated, the Trainer must switch out any other remaining one. Battles are also conducted at "Colosseums" in several cities.

Unlike most Pokémon games, Colosseum does not feature random encounters. The player begins the game with two Pokémon, but can obtain more in the course of the game by "snagging" them from other Trainers using Poké Balls of various strengths. Only specifically designated "Shadow Pokémon", whose hearts have been artificially closed, can be snagged. This contrasts with the normal means of acquiring Pokémon in other games by catching them from the wild. Pokémon can be traded between Colosseum and the Game Boy Advance games Ruby, Sapphire, FireRed, LeafGreen and Emerald.

Each of the player's Shadow Pokémon has a purple gauge that gradually drains through actions such as entering battle. Once the gauge empties, the player may "Purify" the Pokémon by bringing him or her to Celebi's shrine in Agate Village, or by using a rare "Time Flute" item. Purifying Shadow Pokémon is desirable because while in that status, they will often disobey the player, they cannot gain experience points, and their moves are at first restricted to "Shadow Rush". Additionally, Shadow Pokémon will sporadically enter "Hyper Mode" state during battle, causing them to disobey the player character or attack themselves until the condition is alleviated by selecting the "Call" battle command.

Aside from the story mode, Colosseum also features several non-canonical battle modes. In the "Quick Battle" mode, the player can battle either CPU trainers or friends, using Pokémon obtained in the story mode or randomly assigned ones. Battles in this mode do not result in gaining experience points or money. In the single-player battle mode, the player competes at Colosseum—stadiums used throughout the game for Pokémon battles—and earns "Poké Coupons", another currency which can be used to buy rare items. In the "Gang Battle" mode, up to four players can compete in a tournament. The first can use Pokémon obtained in the story mode, or from the Game Boy Advance games. Players two through four, however, can only use Pokémon from the Game Boy Advance games.

== Plot ==
Pokémon Colosseum's 3D overworld features visual detail and a fixed camera angle that is comparable to Square Enix's Final Fantasy series. Shown here is Es Cade's office. Characters of various significance clockwise from top left: Verde, Trudly, Folly, Miror B. (with afro), Wes, Rui, Bluno, and Rosso.

=== Setting ===
Pokémon Colosseum is set in the Orre region. Orre is a mostly desertous region in which no wild Pokémon can be found (although the sequel, Pokémon XD: Gale of Darkness, adds wild Pokémon spots to the region). Orre consists of many cities, towns, and Colosseums.

=== Characters ===
The game's player protagonist is by default named Wes (レオ, Reo; Leo), but as with most Pokémon games, the player can change his name. Wes's Starter Pokémon are Espeon and Umbreon, two fox-like Pokémon who start at level 25 and 26, respectively. Additionally, shortly after the game begins, the player meets the game's partner character, Rui; she accompanies Wes on his journey, and uses her ability to see Shadow Pokémon to help combat the efforts of the game's villains. Team Snagem (スナッチ団, Sunatchi-dan; Snatch Gang), a criminal organization that uses "Snag Machine" technology to capture Trainer-owned Pokémon as if they were wild, serves as an antagonistic entity in the game, of whom Wes is a former member. However, shortly after the game's start, Cipher (シャドー団, Shadō-dan; Shadow Gang) is revealed to be the main antagonistic force, having partnered with Team Snagem to steal Pokémon from Trainers, corrupt them into Shadow Pokémon, and distribute them throughout Cipher's ranks and the Orre Region's general populace. The organization employs many grunt workers, as well as four administrators: disco-loving Miror B. (ミラーボ, Mirābo; Mirorbo), the brutal enforcer Dakim (ダキム, Dakimu), the vain idol of The Under, Venus (ヴィーナス, Vīnasu), and the ruthless scientist who created Shadow Pokémon, Ein (ボルグ, Borugu; Borg).

=== Story ===
The game begins with a cold open in which Wes infiltrates Team Snagem's hideout and steals their portable Snag Machine before leaving the organization, destroying their hideout with a bomb as he escapes. Passing through the Outskirt Stand, a dilapidated train engine in the middle of the desert that has been converted into a shop, Wes proceeds to the oasis-like Phenac City and sees two men named Folly and Trudly carrying a large sack. After defeating them in battle, Wes opens the sack to find Rui, a girl who was kidnapped because she witnessed an unusually violent Pokémon that exuded a black aura visible only to her. They meet the mayor, Es Cade, and report the incident, and while Es Cade expresses skepticism over Rui's claim, he promises to launch an investigation. Upon leaving Es Cade's, Team Snagem grunts find Wes and Rui and reveal to Rui that Wes once worked for Team Snagem as a snagger, a specialist in Pokémon theft. Shortly after defeating one of the grunts, Wes and Rui encounter Folly and Trudly in Es Cade's house and meet their boss, Miror B., who quickly leaves. Trudly battles Wes with the unusual Pokémon Rui saw before. Rui urges Wes to snag it from Trudly, and after he does so, she asks him to join forces with her in finding and snagging the remaining Pokémon with black auras (later named Shadow Pokémon), which he continues to do throughout their journey.

After leaving Phenac, Wes visits Pyrite Town, where Rui was kidnapped. In Pyrite, Wes and Rui find that Shadow Pokémon are being openly distributed to winners of the town's Colosseum tournament by Miror B., who is part of a secret criminal organization known as Cipher. The local police force is powerless to stop the practice, so Wes and Rui see Duking, an influential man in Pyrite who runs the Colosseum. However, Miror B. has kidnapped Duking's Pokémon as a hostage, so Duking asks Wes to enter the next tournament and infiltrate Miror B.'s operation. Wes enters the Colosseum challenge and wins, but he is recognized once he is escorted inside Cipher's Pyrite building. Wes and Rui then battle their way through the building and the maze-like Pyrite Cave set in the cliff face behind it. Eventually, they battle and defeat Miror B. and free Duking's Pokémon, ousting Miror B. from Pyrite. A team of kids working in Duking's house introduce themselves as members of an anti-Cipher news network, known as the Kids Grid, who pledge their help to Wes and Rui.

Leaving Pyrite, Wes and Rui travel to Agate Village, a mountain village home to many retired trainers, including Rui's grandparents. After being introduced to Rui's grandfather Eagun, Wes stops a group of Cipher agents from destroying the Relic Stone, a shrine protected by Celebi that can purify Shadow Pokémon and return them to their former state. Shortly after, Wes is contacted by Duking and is told that Mt. Battle, a battling facility built above a volcano, is under attack by Cipher, so Wes and Rui leave to resolve the crisis. After defeating the Cipher admin Dakim, who raided Mt. Battle to steal an item related to the Relic Stone, Wes and Rui returned to Pyrite Town after being informed about the capture of two of Miror B.'s henchmen. Using a key lifted from the henchmen, Wes and Rui gain access to The Under, an underground city beneath Pyrite.

The heroes find that The Under is controlled by another Cipher admin, Venus, who uses TV broadcasts to spread pro-Cipher propaganda throughout the city. They also find more members of the Kids Grid, who have been cut off from the others because Venus is jamming their signal. Venus tried to thwart Wes and Rui by turning The Under's residents against them, but eventually Wes And Rui reach Venus' TV studio and confront her there. Venus attempts to flee to the Shadow Pokémon Lab, a covert facility in the desert where Pokémon are transformed into Shadow Pokémon, via an underground train. Venus escapes, but Wes and Rui pick up a dropped key and infiltrate the lab from the main entrance. They find and defeat the head researcher Ein, another Cipher admin and the one who invented the process of creating Shadow Pokémon. Wes and Rui also shut down the lab, cutting off Cipher's ability to create more Shadow Pokémon, and retrieve a data file containing information on existing Shadow Pokémon, which is delivered to and decrypted by the Kids Grid.

Wes and Rui then travel to Cipher's headquarters, the recently-constructed Realgam Tower near Pyrite Town. Wes battles each of the Cipher admins again to receive keys to the Colosseum at the top of the building, where he battles the apparent head of Cipher, Nascour. After being defeated, the enraged Nascour threatens Wes but is interrupted by Es Cade, who reveals that he is Evice, the true head of Cipher, and battles Wes. When Wes defeats him, Evice attempts to escape using a helicopter, but the legendary Pokémon Ho-Oh suddenly appears and destroys the vehicle with a fireball. Evice and Nascour are then placed under arrest as Pyrite Town's police arrive.

Following the end of the main story, Wes and Rui continue snagging the remaining Shadow Pokémon that Cipher created and using the Relic Stone to purify them. They also raid Team Snagem's destroyed hideout to defeat their boss Gonzap, pursue the Cipher admins to the Deep Colosseum in The Under, and thwart the plans of a Cipher agent who attacked civilians with a Shadow Pokémon while disguised as Wes to defame him.

== Development and release ==
Pokémon Colosseum was developed by the Japanese game developer Genius Sonority, and published by Nintendo. Just as Nintendo 64 predecessors Pokémon Stadium and Pokémon Stadium 2 had served as home console counterparts to the first- and second-generation handheld titles, Colosseum had a similar role for the third generation.

The new concept for Pokémon Colosseum was influenced by RPGs such as Final Fantasy VII and Persona 2 over the Pokémon mold. When asked in an interview with Prima Games why the gameplay of Colosseum did not mirror that of the handheld Pokémon games, Pokémon director Junichi Masuda explained: "How players communicate with each other has been key to the Pokémon games – it is the backbone of all Pokémon game designs. I feel that the handheld systems work better than the home-based consoles. It's certainly possible to come up with concepts for home-based consoles, but we might then have to change the core of the game."

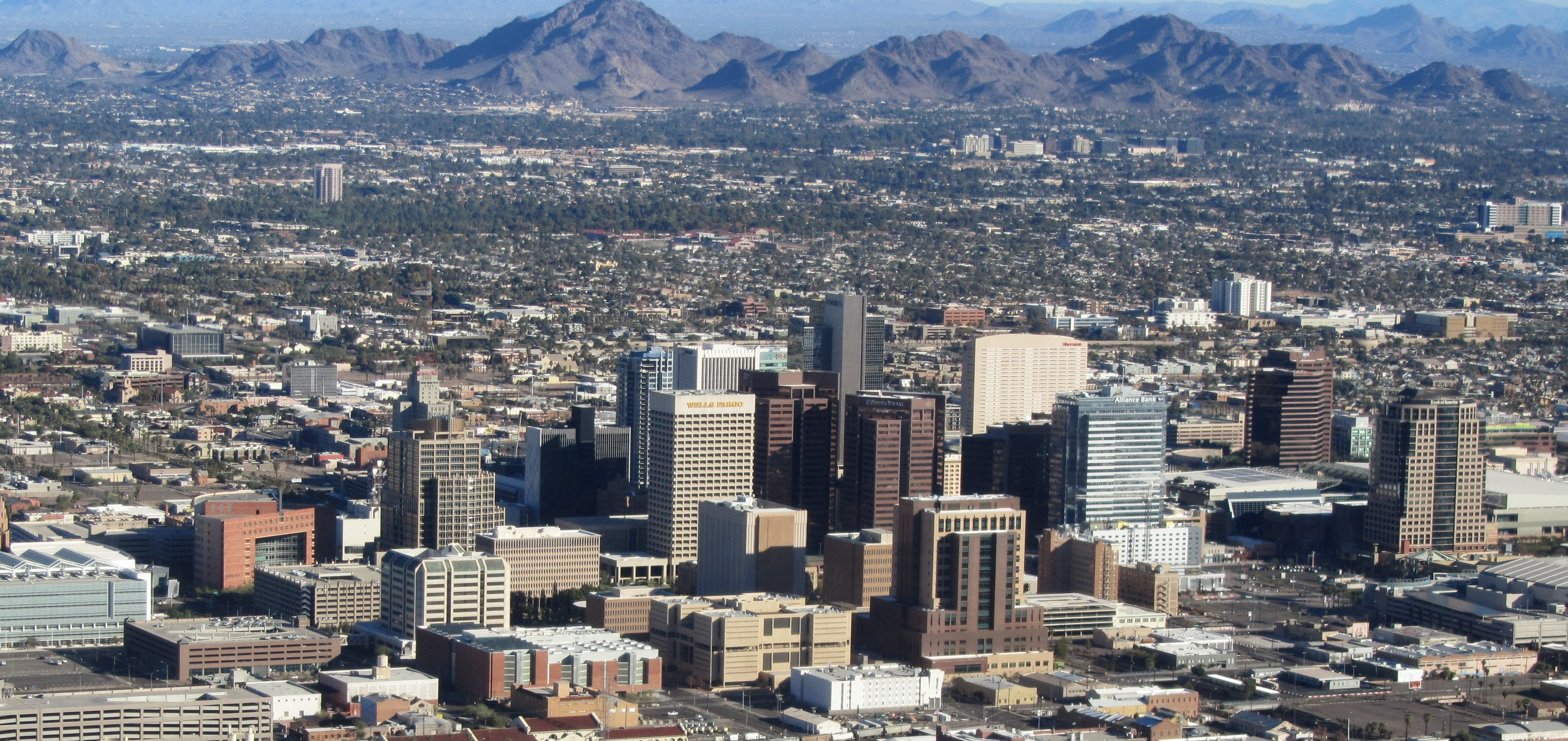
The city of Phoenix, Arizona (pictured in 2011), was primarily used as the basis for the Orre region.

The transition to 3D also brought new graphical changes. Wes was designed to look "hazy" and about 17 years old. Genius Sonority ported most of the models and animations of first- and second-generation Pokémon from Stadium and Stadium 2. Genius Sonority based most of Orre on the real-life city of Phoenix, Arizona. As a whole, the graphics were influenced more by manga than by established Pokémon convention.

A preview for the game was hosted at E3 2003. Upon completion of development, Colosseum received a rating of "E" (Everyone) from the Entertainment Software Rating Board, "All Ages" from Computer Entertainment Rating Organization, and "3+" from Pan European Game Information. The game was released on November 21, 2003, in Japan; March 22, 2004, in North America, and May 14, 2004, in Europe.

Nintendo also published supplementary media to unlock additional content. Pre-ordered copies of the game came with a bonus disc that contains trailers for the game and the film Pokémon: Jirachi Wish Maker. The North American disc also contains the exclusive Pokémon Jirachi that can be downloaded to the player's copy of Ruby or Sapphire. The Japanese release contains a downloadable Celebi instead and requires a completed save file of Pokémon Colosseum. The disc also updates the software in Ruby and Sapphire to remove a "berry glitch" discovered in 2003. Despite public anticipation the Bonus Disc was not released in PAL territories, prompting Nintendo to issue an official apology. However a Jirachi was later included in the PAL version of the game Pokémon Channel. In Japan, scannable cards for the Nintendo e-Reader were available for purchase that featured additional trainers to battle and capture Shadow Pokémon.

== Reception ==
=== Critical response ===
Reception

Aggregate scores
Aggregator	Score
GameRankings	73.46%
Metacritic	73/100

Review scores
Publication	Score
AllGame	3.5/5
Computer and Video Games	9/10
Electronic Gaming Monthly	7/10
Famitsu	33/40
GamePro	70%
GameSpot	7.3/10
GameSpy	3/5
GamesRadar+	88%
GameZone	8.5/10
IGN	7.5/10
Nintendo Power	94%
Nintendo World Report	8.0/10
Gamers Hell	7.9/10
Yahoo!	6/10

Pokémon Colosseum was generally well-received upon release, with respective scores of 73/100 and 73.46% from aggregators Metacritic and GameRankings. Allgame staff writer Scott Alan Marriott gave the game three and a half stars out of five, although he did not review the game with more depth. During the 8th Annual Interactive Achievement Awards, the Academy of Interactive Arts & Sciences nominated Pokémon Colosseum for "Console Children's Game of the Year".

Critics praised Colosseum as the first true 3D role-playing installment in the Pokémon series and for its darker tone. Gamers Hell reviewer John K. called it "certainly a step in the right direction to a good 3D Pokémon game", although he felt that the limited number of Pokémon and lack of a true overworld detracted from the experience. IGN staff writer Craig Harris said that the adaptation of the Pokémon RPG formula to the 3D zeitgeist "does a decent enough job" and is "a bit more linear and straightforward".

The new 3D graphics received mixed remarks. Harris called the game "[g]raphically ... a mixed bag", praising the visual style of the game's Pokémon but criticizing the "poorly modeled and animated, angular" style of the Trainers. GameSpot reviewer Ryan Davis offered a similar opinion, concluding that "[t]he visual style ... has gone off the deep end". GamePro writer Star Dingo called the graphics as a whole "insanely cute" but criticized the lack of animations showing two Pokémon attacking in tandem. GameZone's review took a more positive stance, saying that "[a]nimations are brief but impressive; each attack move is more elaborate and more extravagant on the 'Cube." Nintendo Power thought similarly, commending the "amazing level of detail". Nimensio Rivera of the San Diego Union-Tribune praised the game for its gameplay, graphics and replay value, but criticized its sound, specifically its soundtrack which was described as “Saturday morning-ish.”

GameZone compared the overall town design and environments to those of the landmark Final Fantasy VII. Dingo complained that "there are some characters to talk to and chests to find, but no 'overworld' with free-roaming monsters to capture." John K. stated that "[t]he towns are made with enough detail, but sometimes a bit dull."

Harris denounced the game's usage of old Pokémon battle cries, a recurring complaint of the series. Dingo called the music as a whole "a bit too low-tech and synthetic". GameZone, in contrast, stated that the sound effects evoke nostalgia for Pokémon Red and Blue, and that the music tracks "have more depth than any of the songs from the previous Pokémon games." John K. said that the music is neither annoying nor entertaining. Retronauts described Colosseum as "terrible", citing the reuse of graphics from the Pokémon Stadium games.

In 2006, Nintendo Power listed Colosseum as the 121st greatest video game to appear on a Nintendo console.

=== Sales ===
Three weeks before its release, pre-orders of Pokémon Colosseum made it the best-selling game on Amazon.com. In the game's first week of release in the United Kingdom, it boosted the GameCube's market share from 16% to 32%. It was the best-selling GameCube game of May 2004, and fourteenth among all consoles. In 2005, the game was certified as part of Nintendo's Player's Choice line in North America, representing at least 250,000 copies sold. As of 2007, the game has sold over 1.15 million copies in the United States and 656,270 in Japan. It is the best-selling RPG for the GameCube.

=== Legacy ===
Pokémon Colosseum spawned a high-profile tournament in the United Kingdom entitled "Pokémon Colosseum Battlemaster 2004". The first round of battles was held at Toys "R" Us locations, with later battles taking place in movie theaters. Across Europe, the game was bundled with GameCube consoles shortly after its release. Special editions of this set also included a copy of Pokémon Box: Ruby and Sapphire—a game that allows players to organize and store up to 1,500 Pokémon from their games—as well as a memory card and a Game Boy Advance–GameCube link cable.

A manga adaptation of Colosseum's plot was printed in 2004 issues of the Japanese magazine CoroCoro Comic and titled Pokémon Colosseum Snatcher Leo (ポケモンコロシアムスナッチャーズレオ). The game was followed by a 2005 sequel entitled Pokémon XD: Gale of Darkness. Set in Orre five years after Colosseum, it features a new protagonist snagging Shadow Pokémon from Team Cipher. Shadow Lugia is the game's mascot, and serves as an antagonist whom the player can snag. The game alludes to Wes, Rui, and The Under, though they do not appear.

== See also ==
- Pokémon Battle Revolution
