= Mew (Pokémon) =

Pokémon species

- Pokémon character
- Mew artwork by Ken Sugimori
- First game: Pokémon Red and Blue (1996)
- Created by: Shigeki Morimoto, Satoshi Tajiri
- Designed by: Ken Sugimori (finalized artwork)
- Voiced by: Various: Kōichi Yamadera (Mewtwo Strikes Back) Christine Marie Cabanos (Pokémon Origins)

In-universe information
- Species: Pokémon
- Type: Psychic

Mew (/mjuː/; Japanese: ミュウ, Hepburn: Myū) is one of the many fictional species in the Pokémon franchise. It is a small, pink, Psychic-type Mythical Pokémon, which is an incredibly rare and powerful Pokémon typically available only via special events. It was added to the Pokémon Red and Blue games by Game Freak programmer Shigeki Morimoto, at the tail end of the games' development. Though it was not planned to be obtainable, it was discovered through data mining and its presence in the games became surrounded by many rumors and myths. For years, Mew could not be obtained in the games through normal play except through some specific Pokémon distribution events, though it could be obtained through a variety of glitches.

Mew's first film appearance was in Pokémon: The First Movie as one of the main characters alongside Mewtwo. In the movie, a team of scientists used a fossilized Mew eyelash to create Mewtwo, a genetically enhanced Mew clone. Mew later appeared in Pokémon: Lucario and the Mystery of Mew as a main character alongside Lucario. Due to the mystery surrounding its obtainability in the original games, Mew has been considered highly iconic and a large part of what made the Pokémon franchise so successful, as the hype around obtaining it greatly increased sales for the games. To date, this Pokémon is still largely popular with its appearances in multiple Pokémon franchise games.

== Concept and creation ==
Mew is a species of fictional creatures called Pokémon created for the Pokémon media franchise. Developed by Game Freak and published by Nintendo, the Japanese franchise began in 1996 with the video games Pokémon Red and Green for the Game Boy, which were later released in North America as Pokémon Red and Blue in 1998. In these games and their sequels, the player assumes the role of a Trainer whose goal is to capture and use the creatures' special abilities to combat other Pokémon. Each Pokémon has one or two elemental types, which define its advantages and disadvantages when battling other Pokémon. A major goal in each game is to complete the Pokédex, a comprehensive Pokémon encyclopedia, by capturing, evolving, and trading with other Trainers to obtain individuals from all Pokémon species.

Mew's sprite from the Japanese release of Pokémon Red and Green utilized more "fetus-like" aspects.

Unlike the other Pokémon from Pokémon Red and Blue, Mew's development was not overseen by Ken Sugimori, but by Game Freak programmer Shigeki Morimoto. Morimoto programmed Mew into the game secretly as a prank amongst the staff just prior to its release in Japan. Its origins, however, lay with Satoshi Tajiri, who conceived the idea of an elusive, phantom-like Pokémon from games like Xevious and Space Invaders, with the basis of these ideas being based around rumors of hidden secrets in those games. He created Mew with the intention of having a "character that exists but doesn't appear" that would be the subject of rumors, which Tajiri considered exciting for players. It was intended to be a Pokémon only Game Freak staff members would know about and be able to obtain. Mew was added at the very end of the development of Pokémon Red and Blue by Morimoto after the debug features were removed, which freed up just enough space to add the character despite being told not to alter the game any further at this point by Nintendo. When space was made for Mew, Morimoto initially wished for Sugimori to design the creature, but Sugimori was unable to make time due to the game's approaching release date. As a result, Morimoto designed and made Mew himself. Mew's sprite was much smaller and not colored in due to a lack of storage space, which was why it primarily only uses one color in its design. Sugimori later returned to help make the official artwork for the Pokémon species, basing the artwork off of the in-game sprites. He disliked the fetus-like aspects of Mew's original in-game sprite and revised the design into its modern-day appearance.

Though it was not intended by the developers to be obtainable, due to a glitch, players were able to encounter it. During initial distributions for Mew, the pool of those who would potentially receive one was relatively small—numbering only twenty in the first and one hundred in the second—due to the fact that each Mew had to be individually generated on Morimoto's PC and then manually traded to winning cartridges. Morimoto would later aid in the development of a later Mew event that appeared in Pokémon Emerald.

=== Design and characteristics ===
Mew is a Psychic-type mythical Pokémon with high stats. Morimoto designed it as a pale pink feliform creature with somewhat large eyes and a long, thin tail that broadens at the end, though the shiny version is blue and rarely distributed. Mew was primarily designed off of its in-universe clone, Mewtwo. It was designed as a simpler version of Mewtwo, being visually much smaller in terms of both size and sprite, with less detail on its body, so it would take up less space in the game's data. Mew was not shown moving until the first movie, and thus it had no behaviors and personality outlined yet. These movements and personality traits were primarily created by the movie's animators, who were working off its in-game sprite. Morimoto was amazed upon seeing the final product in the film. Morimoto has stated that Mew is his favorite design from the series, and has even incorporated the Pokémon as a part of his signature.

Mew's design has been considered similar to hairless cats, as well as embryos. Scientists within the game view it as being the single ancestor of all other Pokémon. It is shy and rarely seen by humans. It is a Mythical Pokémon, Pokémon species which are much more powerful and rare than standard species and are typically only made available by special event. It is the last of the Pokémon from Red and Blue in the order of the in-game Pokédex. In Red, Blue, Yellow, and their remakes, the player can find journal entries in the Pokémon Mansion on Cinnabar Island stating that Mew was discovered deep in the jungles of Guyana, South America, on July 5 of an unspecified year, named on July 10, and that it "gave birth" to Mewtwo on February 6. In the video games, it is possible for Mew to learn any move that can be taught to it via several in-game mechanics, such as tutoring and "Technical Machine" items. It can also transform into other Pokémon via the move Transform. Due to its high overall statistics and vast move pool, Mew is regarded as one of the strongest Pokémon in Red, Blue, and Yellow. In the anime, it is capable of flight, teleportation, shapeshifting (via the move Transform), rendering itself invisible, and summoning bubbles of psychic energy.

== Appearances ==
=== In the video games ===
Mew is mentioned in a journal entry in Cinnabar Mansion, referencing an encounter with it in Guyana. At the time of its introduction, Mew could only be obtained in the Pokémon video games via Nintendo promotional event distributions. This period of event exclusivity ended with the release of My Pokémon Ranch, where Mew was accessible through normal game play without an event distribution. Mew has subsequently been made available in many games in the series. Players can obtain it by buying a Poké Ball Plus, which contains a Mew inside of it that can be sent into Pokémon: Let's Go, Pikachu! and Let's Go, Eevee! or Pokémon Sword and Shield. Mew is also obtainable in Pokémon Brilliant Diamond and Shining Pearl if save data exists on the console for one of the Let's Go games. In Pokémon Sun and Moon, a special "Z-Crystal" item was created for Mew, which allowed it to use a powerful attack only it could use, known as "Genesis Supernova". A special event in which players could obtain Mew and use it to battle a boss Mewtwo took place in Pokémon Scarlet and Violet for a limited time. Mew has appeared in multiple spin-offs, such as Pokémon Snap, Pokémon Go, Pokémon UNITE, Pokémon Masters EX, and New Pokémon Snap. It also appears as one of the Pokémon that can be released from the Poké Ball and Master Ball items in the Super Smash Bros. series.

Mew has long been accessible by the use of glitches or cheating devices. One of the glitches discovered in Pokémon Red, Blue, and Yellow, dubbed "The Mew Glitch," involves exploiting programmed events in order to trigger a wild battle encounter with Mew, allowing for its capture. The glitch was included in Virtual Console re-releases of the game for the Nintendo 3DS, though the captured Mew is not allowed to be transferred into Pokémon Bank without the use of further glitches, which changes an in-game "ID Number" to allow for Mew's successful transfer.

=== In other media ===
Mew's first major appearance in the Pokémon anime was in Pokémon: The First Movie, where it served as one of the main characters. It was believed to be long-extinct, as well as the most powerful Pokémon in existence. After years of research, scientists used Mew's DNA to create Mewtwo, a genetically enhanced clone of Mew who is positioned as the titular main antagonist of the film. Mew later battles its clone in the film, where it appears to stop Mewtwo, though in the Japanese version of the film, Mew was depicted as a cruel being who wished to destroy Mewtwo and its clones. Mew later appears in Pokémon: Lucario and the Mystery of Mew, where Mew kidnaps Pikachu so it can play with him, kickstarting the plot of the film. In Pokémon Journeys: The Series, Mew appeared in a flashback showing the childhood of Goh, one of the anime series's main protagonist Ash Ketchum's traveling companions. In his childhood, Goh encountered Mew, and ever since, Goh's main goal was to capture Mew. He ends up joining a group named "Project Mew" which seeks to find and capture the Mythical Pokémon.

Mew appears in the Pokémon Adventures series of Pokémon manga. Mew, also known as the "Phantom Pokémon" in the manga, appears in the first chapter when the criminal organization Team Rocket tries to capture it. Red, the protagonist, also tries to capture it, but he is easily defeated by Mew. In following chapters, it is revealed that Team Rocket wants to have Mew's DNA to finish the creation of Mewtwo, and Red and the character Green—at this point an antagonistic figure to Red—join forces to save it from being captured.

== Cultural impact ==
A scan of CoroCoro Magazine, showing the "Legendary Offer" to obtain Mew. Contests and distributions such as these helped greatly contribute both to Mew and the Pokémon franchise's popularity.

The initial sales of the Pokémon games were sluggish due to their release window, which was considered a rough patch for new game releases. However, Mew was accidentally discovered by players via glitches, and the existence of Mew led to rampant rumors on how to obtain it, the most notable of which involved looking under a truck sprite in one of the game's major cities. Some players called Nintendo to ask about it, with the company not even being aware of Mew's existence. To stymie possible repercussions for inserting Mew into the game, plans for releasing the Pokémon were quickly unveiled. In the spring of 1996, Game Freak's president Satoshi Tajiri used the Japanese manga journal CoroCoro Comic as an experimental exhibition of Mew and to distribute the first Pokémon Trading Card Game cards as free giveaways, which surprised many at Game Freak, including Morimoto. Due to the success of the experiment, Game Freak announced further contests that would allow for Mew to be obtained. Tajiri described using Mew to create hype around an "invisible character" within the game and to keep interest alive in the title and create rumors and myths about the game passed around by word of mouth, which resulted in increased sales for the game.

The reveal and distribution of Mew through organized events has been noted as a major reason for the series' success in Japan, with a promotion in the April 1996 issue of CoroCoro Comics called the "Legendary Pokémon Offer" offering twenty winners the opportunity to send their cartridges in for Nintendo to add Mew to their games. The offer received over seventy eight thousand entries, exceeding Nintendo's initial expectation of three thousand. Nintendo CEO Satoru Iwata called it "really when things turned round for Pokémon", noting that it caused weekly sales of Red and Green to match their previous monthly sales, subsequently becoming three to four times larger. Players who missed the in-person events had to unlock Mew with cheat devices such as the Pro Action Replay. Fans often bought them solely for that purpose. Many rumors about Mew circulated due to its popularity, ranging from methods on how to obtain it to theories on its association with a similar Pokémon, Ditto, the latter of which Junichi Masuda discredited by saying "each Pokémon we create [has] its own unique element." Many distribution events for other Mythical Pokémon followed in subsequent games, which were based on the success of Mew.

Studies on the impact of fictional characters on children, such as those in the book Pikachu's Global Adventure: The Rise and Fall of Pokémon, have noted Mew as popular with younger female children who tend to be drawn to "cute" characters; Mewtwo in comparison was described as a polar opposite, popular with older male children who tend to be drawn to "tough or scary" characters. The book Media and the Make-believe Worlds of Children noted a similar comparison, describing Mew as "child-like and gentle, combining characteristics of power and cute" and emphasizing the importance of the contrast for children between it and Mewtwo. Mew has been highlighted as a success in part due to its mysterious nature, with TheGamer writer Ben Sledge praising the mythology of Mew, both for its in-game lore and the rumors it generated. He highlighted the big impact it had on his youth, and how it made him disappointed with its easier obtainment in Pokémon GO.

Mew has been widely used to promote the Pokémon franchise due to its iconicity. Mew was one of the Pokémon featured in the 1998 painting on the All Nippon Airways Boeing 747-400. In September 2006, in celebration of the release of Lucario and the Mystery of Mew and Pokémon Mystery Dungeon: Blue Rescue Team and Red Rescue Team, players with a copy of Ruby, Sapphire, Emerald, FireRed, or LeafGreen could go to a Toys "R" Us store to download the creature for free. Included in the DVD of Lucario and the Mystery of Mew was a promotional Mew trading card. A special DS, featuring a color scheme similar to Mew, was also released to promote the film. A special Pokémon Card, nicknamed the "Ancient Mew" card, was used to promote the second Pokémon movie and featured in the film as the inspiration for antagonist Lawrence III's goals of capturing Legendary Pokémon. The card was reprinted for Japanese showings of Pokémon: Mewtwo Strikes Back — Evolution. In 2021, Oreos depicting Pokémon characters were released, with those depicting Mew being particularly rare and sought after by fans of the series, leading to bids on sales of the cookie jumping up to prices as high as several thousand dollars. In 2024, the Oreo Pokémon cookies were rolled out in Southeast Asia; its accompanying promo encouraged participants to send a photo of them holding a Mew cookie.
