= Pokémon Emerald =

2004 video game

- North American box art for Pokémon Emerald, depicting the Legendary Pokémon Rayquaza
- Developer: Game Freak
- Publishers: JP: The Pokémon Company; WW: Nintendo
- Director: Shigeki Morimoto
- Producers: Hiroyuki Jinnai; Hitoshi Yamagami; Gakuji Nomoto; Hiroaki Tsuru
- Artist: Ken Sugimori
- Writers: Akihito Tomisawa; Hitomi Sato; Toshinobu Matsumiya
- Composers: Go Ichinose; Junichi Masuda; Morikazu Aoki; Hitomi Sato
- Series: Pokémon
- Platform: Game Boy Advance
- Release: JP: 16 September 2004; NA: 1 May 2005; AU: 9 June 2005; EU: 21 October 2005
- Genre: Role-playing
- Modes: Single-player, multiplayer

Pokémon Emerald Version (Note: Japanese: ポケットモンスター エメラルド, Hepburn: Poketto Monsutā Emerarudo; lit. "Pocket Monsters: Emerald") is a 2004 role-playing video game developed by Game Freak and published by The Pokémon Company and Nintendo for the Game Boy Advance. It was first released in Japan in 2004, and was later released internationally in 2005. It is the fifth version, after both Pokémon Ruby and Sapphire and Pokémon FireRed and LeafGreen, and is the final game of the third generation of the Pokémon video game series.

The gameplay and controls are largely the same as the previous games in the series; players control a Pokémon trainer from an overhead perspective. As with Ruby and Sapphire, the player's general goal is to explore the Hoenn Region and conquer a series of eight Pokémon Gyms in order to challenge the Elite Four and the Hoenn League Champion, while the main subplot is to defeat two criminal organizations attempting to harness a legendary Pokémon's power for their own goals. Along with Pokémon that debuted in Ruby and Sapphire, the game incorporates Pokémon from Pokémon Gold and Silver not featured in Ruby and Sapphire.

Emerald's reception was generally positive upon release. Praise was given to the addition of the Battle Frontier and for fixing story elements from Pokémon Ruby and Sapphire.

== Gameplay ==
The gameplay in Emerald is largely the same as in Ruby and Sapphire. Much of the game takes place in an overhead style; players' characters can move in four directions and can talk to other people on the overworld. Players can encounter wild Pokémon by walking into grass, surfing on their Pokémon, walking through caves, and other means. They can also battle other trainers' Pokémon. When this happens, the game shifts to a battle screen where players and their Pokémon are seen on the front-left portion of the screen while opponents are viewed on the back-right portion. Stats of the Pokémon and their trainers are shown on the side of each participant; these stats include the Pokémon's levels, each trainers' number of Pokémon (from one to six), the Pokémon's health, and any status effects, such as poison, paralysis, burn, or confusion. Trainers send out the first Pokémon in their party and they take turns attacking where the first strike is determined usually by the speed of the two Pokémon. Players can choose from one of four options: Fight, Bag, Switch, and Run. Each Pokémon has up to four moves that they can use, which have different effects, number of uses, and types, such as Grass or Psychic. When a Pokémon hits 0 hit points (HP), they faint, forcing the Pokémon's trainer to switch out. Once one trainer runs out of Pokémon, the battle is over. When a human-controlled Pokémon wins a battle, the Pokémon gains experience. Enough experience will earn that Pokémon a higher level, which grants upgraded stats—attack, defense, special attack, special defense, HP, and speed—and sometimes grant new moves and prompt the Pokémon to evolve.

Certain battles allow for two-on-two battles; certain moves were designed to support partners while other moves are capable of attacking two or more Pokémon. Unlike Ruby and Sapphire which had the player fight two specific trainers, Emerald allowed for the player to have a 2-on-2 battle with two trainers both of whom they could usually battle separately. Every Pokémon has an ability that often aides in battle, such as abilities that make a Pokémon more powerful if they are close to fainting. Wild Pokémon encountered by players can be captured using items called Poké Balls, which have a greater chance of success the weaker the wild Pokémon is. Players can battle and trade with others using any of the third generation Pokémon games including Emerald, Ruby, Sapphire, FireRed, and LeafGreen by linking their Game Boy Advance systems together. This can be accomplished either by using a Game Boy Advance Link Cable or by use of the wireless adapter that was bundled with FireRed and LeafGreen. It is also compatible with Pokémon XD: Gale of Darkness. This allows players to trade for Pokémon not normally obtainable in Emerald.

Aside from the traditional battle and overworld style, players' Pokémon are also able to participate in Pokémon Contests where they can try and win in five contest categories: "Cool", "Beauty", "Cute", "Smart", and "Tough" competitions. The players' characters are given a device early on called the PokéNav, which allows players to view the world map, check their Pokémon's contest stats, and make and receive phone calls with trainers that they have met with whom they can chat or plan a battle. This replaces a function called "Trainer's Eyes", which allows players to register certain trainers and see when they are in the mood to battle. This also allows players to re-battle Gym Leaders, an ability not found in previous Pokémon games. Emerald includes several other new features and changes, such as animations of Pokémon in-battle and an area called the Battle Frontier which is an expansion of the Battle Tower found in previous games. A man whom players encounter several times throughout the game will eventually allow them to access the Battle Frontier after beating the Pokémon League Champion. The Battle Frontier features the aforementioned Battle Tower in addition to six new areas. Completing these areas awards players with "Battle Points" which can be spent on prizes to use in and out of battle. The Japanese version features compatibility with the Nintendo e-Reader; however, this was cut for the English release due to its lack of success. Also featured is the Trainer Hill area which, in the Japanese version, is compatible with the e-Reader. Rare Pokémon that originated from earlier Pokémon games, such as Mew, Lugia, and Ho-Oh, were made available through an in-game event.

== Setting and story ==
The setting and story remain largely the same as Ruby and Sapphire. Players can choose between either a boy or girl, both of whom have been given new outfits with a green color scheme, and one of three Pokémon before they proceed from their hometown into the rest of the game's world.

Players are tasked with filling their Pokédex by catching different Pokémon species and evolving them. They are also tasked to complete eight gym challenges and defeat the Elite Four and the Pokémon League Champion by battling their Pokémon. Along the way, they make two rivals: May or Brendan, (Note: The gender not picked by the player at the beginning of the game is used as the child of Professor Birch.) the child of the Pokémon Professor Birch, and Wally, a timid child from Petalburg who the player assists in catching his first Pokémon, a Ralts. They also encounter Wallace, the Hoenn League Champion.

Along their journey, they face both Team Magma and Team Aqua, who originally could only be faced in Ruby and Sapphire, respectively. Both have a goal to change the world they believe will benefit Pokémon—Magma desiring to expand the landmass and Aqua desiring to expand the sea—and both plan to accomplish their respective goals by summoning the Legendary Pokémon Groudon and Kyogre, respectively. Both teams make repeated efforts to alter the landscape. Team Magma attempts to make a volcano erupt and Team Aqua tries to steal a weather-altering Pokémon.

Between the player's visit to the seventh and eighth gyms, both teams summon their respectively-sought legendary Pokémon with mystical orbs stolen from Mt. Pyre; however, the Pokémon refuse to obey either team and begin fighting, which puts the world in a constantly switching state of droughts and heavy rainfalls. The player climbs a tower in order to summon the Legendary Pokémon Rayquaza, who quells the other two Pokémon's rage.

After the player defeats the Elite Four and Wallace to become the new Hoenn League Champion, they are able to encounter two Pokémon flying across Hoenn, Latias and Latios, and can access an area called the Battle Frontier, which adds several new challenges for the player. The player gains access to a battle with former Hoenn League Champion Steven Stone in Meteor Falls, who uses a powered-up version of his team in Ruby and Sapphire. The player is now able to catch Kyogre and Groudon, which can be tracked by talking to the scientist in the Weather Institute.

== Development and promotion ==
Pokémon Emerald was developed by Game Freak and published by Nintendo for the Game Boy Advance. It was first announced in Coro Coro Magazine. It features compatibility with the Nintendo e-Reader and 83 cards launched for Emerald on 7 October 2004. It is the third version of Ruby and Sapphire and follows a tradition of third releases, e.g. Pokémon Yellow for Pokémon Red and Blue. The wireless adapter was bundled with Japanese copies of Emerald; this was removed from English versions of the game.

Nintendo has done several promotions related to Emerald. Nintendo held a competition for players based on Emerald where players compete to be the "Pokémon Emerald Ultimate Frontier Battle Brain". The competition took place in seven areas across the United States and Canada, where 14 finalists, two from each area, competed in Seattle, Washington's Space Needle for a trip for two to the Pokémon Park in Nagoya, Japan. People could also enter to win a trip to the Space Needle to watch the competition. The competition centered around trivia about characters from Pokémon and their abilities. Nintendo also introduced a pre-order program that would give those who pre-ordered the game exclusive access to a Pokémon website, a collector's tin holder, and a guide to the Battle Frontier. A limited edition Game Boy Advance SP was released by Nintendo which featured a silhouette of the Pokémon Rayquaza. It was distributed by Nintendo in Japan exclusively on their website "Pokémon Trainer Online" and was never released outside of Japan. It was featured in the Official Nintendo Magazine's list of rare Pokémon consoles. Players who brought their Game Boy Advance with a copy of Emerald and a wireless adapter to Booth 2029 of the 2005 Comic-Con International were given an in-game item called the Mystic Ticket which allows players the opportunity to capture Lugia and Ho-oh.

== Reception ==
=== Critical reception ===
Reception

Aggregate scores
Aggregator	Score
GameRankings	76.65%
Metacritic	76%

Review scores
Publication	Score
1Up.com	7/10
Electronic Gaming Monthly	7.17/10
Game Informer	6.5/10
GameSpot	7.5/10
IGN	8/10
Nintendo Power	3.5/5

Pokémon Emerald received generally positive reception and holds aggregate scores of 76/100 and 76.65% on Metacritic and GameRankings respectively. It received an award for excellence at the ninth annual CESA game awards. IGN's Craig Harris stated that while he was not enthused by Emerald, he admitted that it was a solid game and that it was the best version to get for people who hadn't played Ruby or Sapphire yet. 1UP.com's Christian Nutt felt that it was the definitive version of Pokémon at the time yet was also a rehash. GameSpy's Phil Theobald felt that it was a good game in its own right but felt like the same game as Ruby and Sapphire. GameSpot's Ryan Davis noted that it was a quality experience despite being similar to Ruby and Sapphire and that hardcore fans may appreciate its changes. Eurogamer's Corey Brotherson felt that it was a good game in its own right but was lacking in compelling additions. He added however that it was a better game for players new to the series. Nintendo Life's Laurie Blake performed a retroactive review of Emerald; she felt that the Pokémon games have aged well but still feel like they did in 1996. She further stated that the similarities between it and Ruby and Sapphire prevented it from being a must-have while still being good. Allgame's Julia Reges felt that the game had a lot of value for younger players but that older players may be uninterested. She compared Nintendo's remakes of the Pokémon games to the various Star Wars remakes.

IGN's Audrey Drake praised the game for utilizing both of the villain groups and called it a "marked departure" from Ruby and Sapphire. She felt that the ability to re-battle Gym Leaders created an "exciting challenge" for players. She also included Emerald, alongside Ruby and Sapphire, in a list of Game Boy Advance games that she wanted to see on the Nintendo 3DS' eShop. 1UP.com's IGN's Lucas M. Thomas bemoaned the fact that he had to play through the whole game before he could play the Battle Frontier. Jeremy Parish listed Emerald as one of the best games to bring onto a plane. Fellow 1UP.com editor Kat Bailey included it in her list of remakes that "left the originals in the dust". She praised the Battle Frontier and its fixes for flaws found in Ruby and Sapphire.

=== Sales ===
Emerald launched in the top spot in Japan with 791,000 copies sold in its first week and 372,000 copies sold in its first day. It was the fourth best-selling game in Japan for 2004. It sold 1.4 million for the year and ranked behind Dragon Quest V: Hand of the Heavenly Bride, Pokémon FireRed and LeafGreen (combined), and Dragon Quest VIII: Journey of the Cursed King. The list of the top 1000 best-selling video games in Japan for 2010 featured Emerald at 779 with 7,724 copies sold for a total of 1,916,505 sold since release. It was the only Game Boy Advance game on the list. More than 146,000 people pre-ordered copies of Emerald in the US. Emerald launched in the United States at the number one position in May; it followed in June by falling to the number two spot below Grand Theft Auto: San Andreas on Xbox with 265,000 copies sold in that month. It had sold 1.72 million copies worldwide by 1 June 2005. It was the second best-selling game for the first half of 2005. In a poll conducted by IGN, readers ranked Emerald as the most popular Game Boy Advance game for the 2005 holiday season. It ranked second for the whole year of 2005 below Madden NFL 06. By the end of 2005 it had sold 1.2 million in Europe and nearly 5 million worldwide. To date it is one of the three best-selling Game Boy Advance games. Its life-to-date sales totaled 6.32 million by the 2007 fiscal year. In November 2005, Nintendo Power erroneously reported that "Total sales [from Emerald] would exceed the value of an actual emerald the size of Neptune." By 2021, Pokémon Emerald sold 6.80 million worldwide.
