= Pokémon XD: Gale of Darkness =

2005 video game

- North American cover art featuring Shadow Lugia
- Developer: Genius Sonority
- Publishers: JP: The Pokémon Company; WW: Nintendo
- Director: Manabu Yamana
- Producers: Gakuji Nomoto; Hiroyuki Jinnai; Hiroaki Tsuru
- Designers: Sui Hotate; Ryota Aomi; Kōji Ōno; Koichi Iwata; Kuniko Kobashi; Chiharu Sugaya
- Programmers: Teruhito Yamaki; Akihiro Yoshida
- Artist: Shinichi Hiromoto
- Writer: Kazunori Orio
- Composer: Tsukasa Tawada
- Series: Pokémon
- Platform: GameCube
- Release: JP: August 4, 2005; NA: October 3, 2005; AU: November 10, 2005; EU: November 18, 2005
- Genre: Role-playing video game
- Modes: Single-player, multiplayer

Pokémon XD: Gale of Darkness (Note: Japanese: ポケモンXD 闇の旋風ダーク・ルギア, Hepburn: Pokemon Ekkusudī Yami no Senpū Dāku Rugia; Pokémon XD Yami no Kaze Dark Lugia "Pokémon XD: Whirlwind of Darkness Dark Lugia") is a role-playing video game in the Pokémon series developed by Genius Sonority and published by The Pokémon Company and Nintendo. It was released for the GameCube on August 4, 2005, in Japan; October 3, 2005, in North America; November 10, 2005, in Australia; and November 18, 2005, in Europe. Pokémon XD is the successor to the GameCube title Pokémon Colosseum and takes place in Orre, the setting of Pokémon Colosseum's adventure mode. All of the Game Boy Advance Pokémon games can connect to this game through trading and Battle Mode.

Pokémon XD was first announced in March 2005 as a new GameCube game and not a sequel to Colosseum, though later developments as well as two promotional demo versions confirmed the game would be similar to its predecessor. Shadow Pokémon, first introduced in Colosseum, are a major gameplay element, and a Shadow Lugia is featured on the game's box art. Munchlax and Bonsly, two Pokémon from the fourth generation of main Pokémon games, make debut appearances in Pokémon XD.

The game garnered mixed reviews among critics, with common criticisms being directed at similarities to and re-used assets from Colosseum. Commercially Pokémon XD was a success, selling more than 1 million copies since its release. Pokémon XD was released on the Nintendo Switch 2 through the Nintendo Classics service on March 18, 2026.

== Gameplay ==
In the new "Purify Chamber" mode, the player arranges purified Pokémon around a Shadow Pokémon to purify the latter. Ideally, four purified Pokémon would be arranged in a clockwise fashion so that each would have a type advantage over the next. This would fill the "tempo" gauge and allow for most efficient purification.

The main focus of the game, like its predecessor, is to fight and capture Shadow Pokémon. Shadow Pokémon are captured using the Snag Machine, identically to Pokémon Colosseum. There are 83 different Shadow Pokémon to collect. Shadow Pokémon come with Shadow-type moves, which, unlike moves of other types before the physical-special split in Pokémon Diamond and Pearl, can be physical or special. These moves are strong against non-Shadow Pokémon, but weak against other Shadows. If the player fails to catch a Shadow Pokémon, there is a second chance available: at random points throughout the game, Miror B., an antagonist from the previous game, will appear with Shadow Pokémon that the player was not able to catch. Once a Shadow Pokémon is captured, the player needs to purify it. There are two different ways of purifying Pokémon: using the Purification Chamber, and carrying the Pokémon in the party until it can be purified.

Pokémon XD also introduces "Poké Spots", where wild Pokémon may be captured after luring them there with bait, as well as two battle-style attractions at hosted at Realgam Tower: Battle SIMs, in which the player uses a pre-set Pokémon team in a puzzle-like battle challenge; and Battle Bingo, in which the player battles and captures Pokémon to strategically fill out a bingo card. Also featured is a multiplayer "Battle Mode" in which multiple players can battle with one another using Pokémon from Pokémon Ruby and Sapphire, Pokémon Emerald, and Pokémon FireRed and LeafGreen.

== Story ==
The story begins five years after the events of Pokémon Colosseum. The player character, named Michael by default, is tasked by the inventor Professor Krane to test the Snag Machine, a device used to capture other trainers' Pokémon. Krane explains that there have been recent sightings of Shadow Pokémon, which are Pokémon whose hearts have been artificially closed. To combat this, Krane is working on developing a Purification Chamber that can restore Shadow Pokémon to normal after they have been "snagged" by Michael using the Snag Machine.

While testing the Snag Machine, Krane is kidnapped by agents of Cipher, the criminal syndicate responsible for creating and distributing Shadow Pokémon. Michael pursues them and defeats one of Cipher's admins to rescue Krane. Michael begins travelling around the Orre region, retaking and purifying Shadow Pokémon from Cipher agents and defeating Cipher's other admins to foil their operations. Greevil, the leader of Cipher, reveals himself to Michael and challenges him to come to Cipher's headquarters on Citadark Isle. There, Greevil unleashes XD001, a Shadow Lugia that was engineered to reject purification, but Michael overcomes it and defeats Greevil. Greevil's son Ardos prepares to blow up Citadark to ensure Cipher survives, but his brother Eldes declares Cipher is finished and convinces Greevil to join him in turning themselves in for arrest, with Ardos swearing vengeance against Michael.

== Development and marketing ==
In March 2005, Nintendo of America executive Reggie Fils-Aimé said that Pokémon XD would be a new GameCube game, but not a sequel to Colosseum. He said that the gameplay would be more similar to the Game Boy Advance role-playing video games Pokémon Ruby and Sapphire.

Japanese gaming magazines Famitsu and CoroCoro Comic later gave screenshots and information that revealed that the game would have 3D graphics similar to those of its predecessor, Pokémon Colosseum. It was also revealed that the game would continue the inclusion of Shadow Pokémon and snagging from Colosseum. Nothing of the plot was revealed, other than the fact that a black Shadow Lugia was said to play a large part in the story. It was also revealed that the player starts with an Eevee, and that the levels progress more closely to the main handheld series.

Nintendo released two demos to promote the game. In the demo released to retail stores, the player goes through two battles where the player can snag three Shadow Pokémon. The second demo was playable on the "Pokémon Rocks America" tour.

The game features two Pokémon officially introduced in Pokémon Diamond and Pearl, released after Pokémon XD: Munchlax and Bonsly.

== Reception ==
Reception

Aggregate scores
Aggregator	Score
GameRankings	66.91%
Metacritic	64/100

Review scores
Publication	Score
G4	3/5
Game Informer	58%
GameSpot	6.9/10
GameSpy	3/5
GamesRadar+	3.5/5
IGN	6.8/10
NGC Magazine	86%
Nintendo Power	85%

Pokémon XD received mixed reviews, usually scoring 6–7 out of 10 (8.6 out of 10 was its highest score).

The game was commonly criticized for having a large amount of recycled material from the earlier Pokémon Colosseum. This recycled material includes a number of reused areas, some recycled graphics and a modified engine. GameSpot commented that "not much has changed since the original". Another common complaint were the Poké Spot areas, regarded as very limited and small compared to Ruby and Sapphire. While discussing the mixed quality of the Pokémon console games, Retronauts recalled it as an example. Gamepro magazine gave the game a mixed review, criticizing the gameplay being monotonous and lacking challenge. They also felt the game "doesn't have the pizazz for mature audiences," but gave praise for the game's flashy visual style of the Pokémon and their attacks, concluding “Gale of Darkness is not a terminally unplayable game by any stretch of the definition, but gamers are going to really have to love Pokémon in order to find gratification here.”

Like its predecessor, Pokémon XD was a commercial success, selling over 1 million units as of March 31, 2006.
