= Pokémon FireRed and LeafGreen =

2004 video games

Pokémon FireRed; Pokémon LeafGreen
- North American box art for the Player's Choice release of Pokémon FireRed and Pokémon LeafGreen, depicting Charizard and Venusaur, respectively
- Developer: Game Freak
- Publishers: JP: The Pokémon Company; WW: Nintendo
- Director: Junichi Masuda
- Producers: Hiroyuki Jinnai; Takehiro Izushi; Hiroaki Tsuru
- Designers: Junichi Masuda; Shigeru Ohmori
- Programmer: Tetsuya Watanabe
- Artist: Ken Sugimori
- Writers: Hitomi Sato; Satoshi Tajiri
- Composers: Go Ichinose; Junichi Masuda; Morikazu Aoki
- Series: Pokémon
- Platforms: Game Boy Advance; Nintendo Switch
- Release: Game Boy Advance: JP: 29 January 2004; NA: 7 September 2004; AU: 23 September 2004; EU: 1 October 2004; Nintendo Switch: WW: 27 February 2026; AU: 28 February 2026
- Genre: Role-playing
- Modes: Single-player, multiplayer

Pokémon FireRed Version (Note: Japanese: ポケットモンスター ファイアレッド, Hepburn: Poketto Monsutā Faiareddo; lit. "Pocket Monsters: FireRed") and Pokémon LeafGreen Version (Note: Japanese: ポケットモンスター リーフグリーン, Hepburn: Poketto Monsutā Rīfugurīn; lit. "Pocket Monsters: LeafGreen") are 2004 remakes of the 1996 role-playing video games Pokémon Red and Green. They were developed by Game Freak and published by The Pokémon Company and Nintendo for the Game Boy Advance. FireRed and LeafGreen were first released in Japan in January 2004 and was released in the same year as FireRed and LeafGreen versions in North America and Europe in September and October 2004, respectively. The games are part of the third generation of the Pokémon video game series and hold the distinction of being the first enhanced remakes of previous games within the franchise.

As in previous games, the player controls their character from an overhead perspective and participates in turn-based battles. Throughout the games, the player captures and raises Pokémon for use in battle. Based in the Kanto Region, new features include a contextual help menu and a new area (Sevii Islands) the player may access after defeating the Elite Four and the Pokémon League Champion. The games have compatibility with the Game Boy Advance Wireless Adapter, which originally came bundled with the games.

The games received mostly positive reviews, obtaining an aggregate score of 81 percent on Metacritic. Most critics praised the fact that the games introduced new features while still maintaining the traditional gameplay of the series. Reception of the graphics and audio was more mixed, with some reviewers complaining that they were too simplistic and lacked improvement compared to the previous games, Pokémon Ruby and Sapphire. FireRed and LeafGreen were commercial successes, selling a total of around 12 million copies worldwide. Nearly two years after their original release, Nintendo remarketed them as Player's Choice titles. The games were released digitally for the Nintendo Switch on 27 February 2026, coinciding with the series' 30th anniversary, selling around 4 million copies for a total of 16 million sales.

== Gameplay ==
In a battle scene, the Pokémon at the top right of the screen (Squirtle) is the opponent's; the bottom left (Charmander) is the player's. The player's four options are shown at the bottom right menu.

As with all Pokémon role-playing games released for handheld consoles, FireRed and LeafGreen are in a third-person, overhead perspective. The main screen is an overworld, in which the player navigates the protagonist. Here, a menu interface may be accessed, in which the player may configure their Pokémon, items, and gameplay settings. When the player encounters a wild Pokémon or is challenged by a trainer, the screen switches to a turn-based battle screen that displays the player's Pokémon and the engaged Pokémon. During a battle, the player may select a move for their Pokémon to perform, use an item, switch their active Pokémon, or attempt to flee (in wild battles only). All Pokémon moves have power points (PP); when a Pokémon tries to perform a move while awake, the move's PP is reduced by 1. When the PP of a move hits zero, the Pokémon is not able to use that move. All Pokémon have hit points (HP); when a Pokémon's HP is reduced to zero, it faints and can no longer battle until it is revived. Once an opponent's Pokémon faints, all of the player's Pokémon involved in the battle receive a certain number of experience points (EXP). After accumulating enough EXP, a Pokémon will level up.

Capturing Pokémon is another essential element of the gameplay. During a battle with a wild Pokémon, the player may throw a Poké Ball at it. If the Pokémon is successfully caught, it will come under the ownership of the player. Factors in the success rate of capture include the HP of the target Pokémon and the type of Poké Ball used: the lower the target's HP and the stronger the Poké Ball, the higher the success rate of capture.

While FireRed and LeafGreen are remakes of Red and Green (Pokémon Green was only released in Japan, whereas the international variant was Blue), they contain usability enhancements such as a contextual tutorial feature, which allows players to look up data at any point in the game by pressing the select button. Additionally, when continuing a saved game, players are shown the last four actions they performed, aiding in remembering what they were previously doing.

The games support the Game Boy Advance Game Link Cable, through which connected players may trade or battle. Players may also connect with Pokémon Ruby and Sapphire, as well as with Pokémon Colosseum, allowing them to obtain over 350 Pokémon. FireRed and LeafGreen also have the ability to connect to the GameCube and interact with Pokémon Box: Ruby and Sapphire. In Pokémon Box, the player may organize and view their collected Pokémon, and in Colosseum, Pokémon may be used in battle. FireRed and LeafGreen are also the first games in the series to be compatible with the Game Boy Advance Wireless Adapter, which comes prepackaged with the games. The adapter can be plugged into the link port of the Game Boy Advance system and allows players within a radius of 30–50 feet (9.1–15.2 m) to wirelessly interact with each other. In addition, as many as 30 players at a time may join a special location called the "Union Room", where they can trade, battle, or chat. Nintendo set up "JoySpots" at Japanese retail locations for this purpose.

== Plot ==
=== Setting ===
Pokémon FireRed and LeafGreen takes place mostly in the fictional region of Kanto. This is one distinct region of many in the Pokémon world, which includes varied geographical habitats for the Pokémon species, human-populated towns and cities, and routes between locations. Some areas are only accessible once players acquire a special item or one of their Pokémon learns a special ability. Near the end of the plot, the protagonist is able to venture to the Sevii Islands, a new area not present in the original Red and Blue games. The Sevii Islands, based on the Izu Islands, are an archipelago of seven islands and contain Pokémon normally exclusive to the Johto region, as well as several post-game missions. After the aforementioned missions on the Sevii Islands are completed, the ability to trade with Ruby and Sapphire for Hoenn-exclusive Pokémon becomes available.

=== Story ===
The silent protagonist of FireRed and LeafGreen is a child who lives in a small town named Pallet Town in the Kanto Region. After players start a journey and venture alone into tall grass, a voice warns them to stop. Professor Samuel Oak, a famous Pokémon researcher, explains to the player that such grass is often the habitat of wild Pokémon, and encountering them alone can be very dangerous. He takes the player to his laboratory, where they meet Oak's grandson, another aspiring Pokémon Trainer. The player and their rival are both instructed to select a Starter Pokémon for their travels. The rival then challenges them to a Pokémon battle with their newly obtained Pokémon and continues to battle the player at certain points throughout the games.

After reaching the next city, the player is asked to deliver a parcel to Professor Oak. Upon returning to the laboratory, they are presented with a Pokédex, a high-tech encyclopedia that records the entries of any Pokémon that are captured. Oak then asks the player to fulfill his dream of compiling a comprehensive list of every Pokémon in the game.

While visiting the region's cities, the player encounters special establishments called Pokémon Gyms. Inside these buildings are Gym Leaders, each of whom the player must defeat in a Gym battle to obtain a Gym Badge. Once a total of eight badges are acquired, the player is given permission to enter the Pokémon League in the Indigo Plateau, which consists of the best Pokémon Trainers in the Kanto Region. There the player battles the Elite Four as well as the Pokémon League Champion: their rival. Also throughout the game, the player has to fight against the forces of Team Rocket, a criminal organization that abuses Pokémon. They devise numerous plans to steal rare Pokémon, all of which the player must foil, meeting and defeating the criminal organization boss Giovanni.

After the first time players defeat the Elite Four, one of the members, Lorelei, disappears. After gaining access to the Sevii Islands, an entirely new region, the player discovers Lorelei in her house and convinces her to come back with them. Once more, the protagonist must thwart Team Rocket's plans on several occasions, recover two artifacts, the Ruby and the Sapphire, and put them in the main computer at One Island. After that, the player can trade with Ruby, Sapphire, Emerald, Colosseum, and XD.

== Development ==
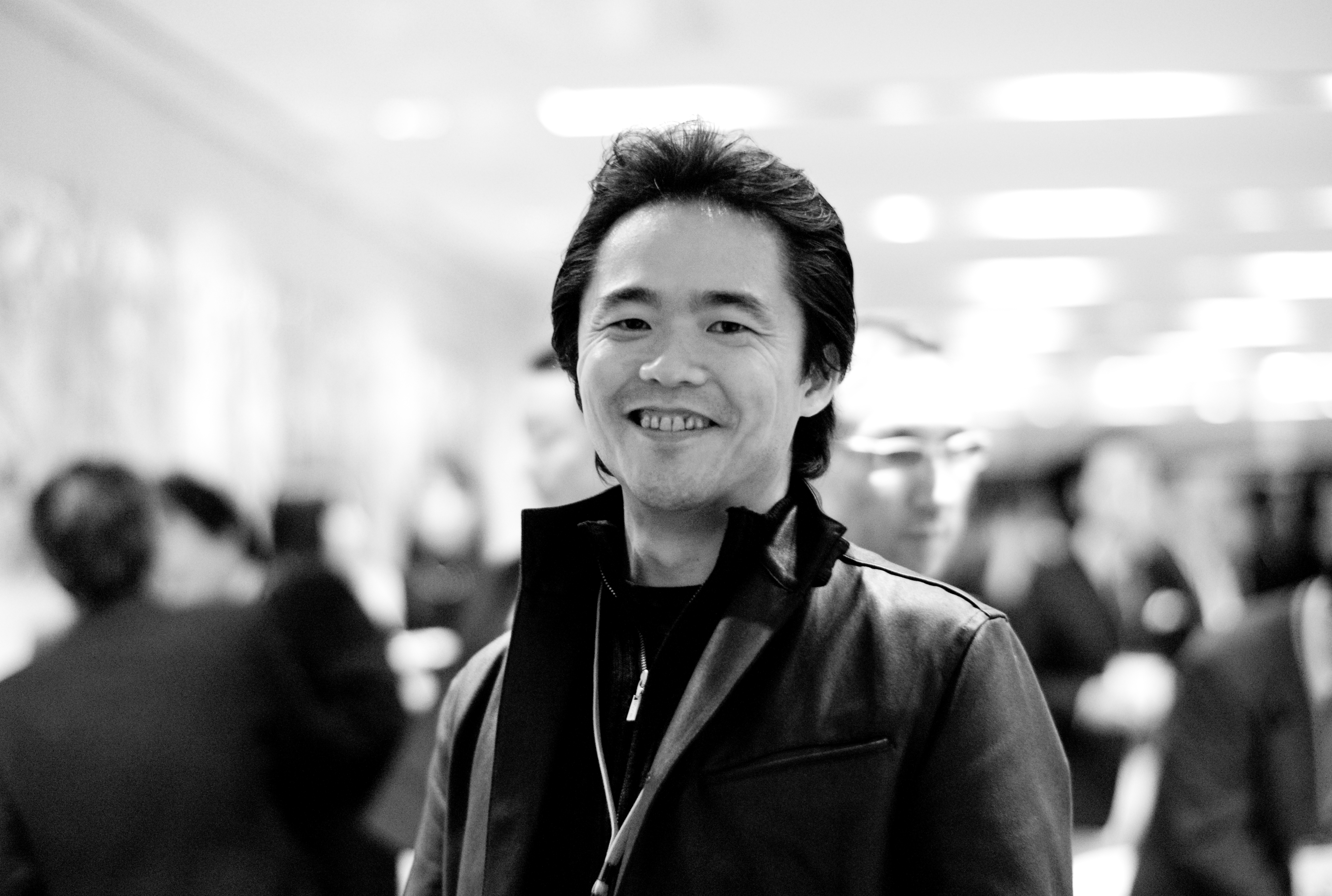
Development director Junichi Masuda

FireRed and LeafGreen were first announced in September 2003 as upcoming remakes of the original Pocket Monsters Red and Green games that were released in Japan in 1996. Game director Junichi Masuda stated the new titles would be developed around the idea of simplicity, as the game engine was a slightly modified version of the one used in Pokémon Ruby and Sapphire. As a result, FireRed and LeafGreen were made fully backward compatible with Ruby and Sapphire, allowing players to trade Pokémon between games.

FireRed and LeafGreen's connectivity with the Game Boy Advance Wireless Adapter was heralded by then-president of Nintendo Satoru Iwata as being able "to enhance head-to-head battles, exchange of information, and communication with others." An enhanced interface was created for the game to increase usability for new players, as well as a contextual in-game help system that could aid lost or confused players during their journey. President of The Pokémon Company Tsunekazu Ishihara noted, "We don't feel that this a [sic] remake at all. We feel that this is a new game, with wireless technology", referring to the bundled wireless adapter.

The exclusive Japanese production run for FireRed and LeafGreen was limited to half a million copies, despite the success of Pokémon Ruby and Sapphire. IGN speculated that Nintendo was expecting less demand for the new games or that it was limited by the production of the bundled wireless adapter. The North American versions of FireRed and LeafGreen were indirectly announced at DICE in 2004. Although the original games were released as Red and Blue in North America, the remakes retained the Japanese names of "Red" and "Green". Masuda noted this as a choice on his part, stating the leaf represented a peaceful icon, in contrast to the alternative of water, which he saw as suggesting conflict with the icon of fire used by the other game.

=== Music ===
The music used in the games was derived from the classic game consoles and arranged by Go Ichinose. Masuda and Ichinose decided not to change the reused music from the basic background sounds used in Red and Blue and instead updated them by adding additional sounds. Some of the songs have additional key changes compared to the original soundtrack, and some songs, such as the Trainer Battle music, are rewritten in MIDI for the GBA and contain pitch bends between notes. A two-disc set of the music entitled GBA Pokémon FireRed & LeafGreen Super Complete was released, with the first disc featuring all the music used normally in-game, while the second disc featured bonus tracks based on and inspired by the music in the games. Among these are two vocal tracks.

== Reception ==
Reception

Aggregate scores
| Aggregator | Score |
|---|---|
| GameRankings | 82.14% (FireRed) (based on 37 reviews) |
| Metacritic | 81/100 (FireRed) (based on 38 reviews) |

Review scores
| Publication | Score |
|---|---|
| Game Informer | 8/10 |
| GameSpot | 8.4/10 (FireRed) |
| GameSpy | 4/5 (FireRed) |
| IGN | 9.0/10 (FireRed) |
| Nintendo Power | 4.5/5 |

Reviews of FireRed and LeafGreen were mostly positive, and the games currently hold an aggregate score of 81 percent on Metacritic. Jon Minife of The New Zealand Herald praised the game for resolving the connectivity issues that Ruby and Sapphire had at the time, which would convince older players to get back into Pokémon. Craig Harris of IGN gave the games an "Outstanding" 9.0/10 rating and praised the creators of the games for creating a game that "works extremely well for the handheld market. It doesn't have quite the same variety as Ruby and Sapphire, but it's still incredibly satisfying." Harris was less positive about the games' graphics, which he thought were "limited" and "basic". GameSpot's Greg Kasavin, who gave the games 8.4 out of 10, commented that "though Pokémon could probably use a few new twists after all these years, FireRed and LeafGreen are great role-playing games on their own merits, filled with lots more content and more challenges than last year's Ruby and Sapphire, and offering up plenty of addictive gameplay that can be a lot of fun for players of all ages." Unlike Harris, Kasavin praised the games' graphics for their "colorful good looks and the endearing character designs that the series is known for." GameSpot later named LeafGreen the best Game Boy Advance game of September 2004. Game Informer rated the games a "Very Good" 8/10 for being "a lot of fun", yet they saw the graphics as "utterly unremarkable" when compared to other handheld games.

GameSpy reviewer Phil Theobald, who awarded the games four out of five stars, stated, "Before I knew it, I was hooked all over again. The engrossingly simple gameplay combined with the more-strategic-than-they-first-appear battles was just too much to resist. And yeah, the 'gotta catch 'em all' gimmick is still effective, not to mention necessary to build a well balanced party. There's just something about tracking down, capturing, and training all those Pokémon that really draw you into the game's world." He justified the games' graphics by comparing them to the "ugly" original Red and Blue versions. Additional praise was given to the new features, such as the contextual tutorial and flashbacks when loading a saved game, as well as the games' multiplayer capabilities via the Wireless Adapter.

=== Sales ===
During the first week of release in Japan, FireRed and LeafGreen sold a combined total of 885,049 copies, which was less than the number sold by Pokémon Ruby and Sapphire in that time period, but IGN reasoned that the smaller sales were due to the games being remakes. By August, in the United States, the games surpassed 150,000 pre-orders, more than double Ruby and Sapphire. Less than one month after releasing in the US, over one million copies of FireRed and LeafGreen were sold. The games were added to Nintendo's Player's Choice line in North America on 2 October 2006 with the retail price reduced to $19.99. However, unlike the original releases, the Player's Choice editions did not include a bundled Wireless Adapter. As of 31 March 2008, the games had sold 11.82 million copies worldwide. By October 2013, Pokémon FireRed and LeafGreen reached 12 million copies worldwide.

=== Award ===
| Year | Award | Category | Result |
|---|---|---|---|
| 2004 | Spike Video Game Awards | Best Handheld | Nominated |
| 2005 | British Academy Game Awards | Handheld | Nominated |
| 2005 | GameSpot's Best and Worst of 2005 | Best Game Boy Advance Game | Nominated |
| 2005 | 8th Annual Interactive Achievement Awards | Wireless Game of the Year | Nominated |

== Nintendo Switch release ==
To celebrate the 30th anniversary of the release of the original Pocket Monsters Red and Green games in Japan, Nintendo rereleased FireRed and LeafGreen for the Nintendo Switch and Nintendo Switch 2 systems on 27 February 2026 after the conclusion of the Pokémon Presents presentation. The games are available for digital purchase through the Nintendo eShop. The ports received criticism for their high price point ($20 US, each) and lack of online features. In Japan, a "Special Edition" physical release is available which includes a reproduction of the original FireRed and LeafGreen Game Boy Advance boxes. These releases contain a download code for the games, as well as a set of three laser engraved glass Poké Balls, including Bulbasaur, Charmander, and Squirtle, with green, red, and blue light-up stands and a display case. The rerelease includes the Aurora Ticket and Mystic Ticket items which were previously distributed special event items which allowed players to catch the mythical Pokemon Deoxys as well as legendary Pokémon Lugia and Ho-Oh. Trading in this rerelease is limited to local wireless. The ability to transfer Pokémon from FireRed and LeafGreen to Pokémon Home came in October 2026, alongside a free Celebi in Home for completing the regional dex.
