= Pokémon Red, Blue, and Yellow =

1996 video games

Pokémon Red Version; Pokémon Blue Version; Pokémon Yellow Version
- North American cover art for Pokémon Red (left), Pokémon Blue (center), and Pokémon Yellow (right), respectively depicting Charizard, Blastoise and Pikachu
- Developer: Game Freak
- Publisher: Nintendo
- Director: Satoshi Tajiri
- Producers: Shigeru Miyamoto; Takashi Kawaguchi; Tsunekazu Ishihara
- Designer: Satoshi Tajiri
- Programmers: Junichi Masuda; Shigeki Morimoto; Tetsuya Watanabe; Sousuke Tamada
- Artists: Ken Sugimori; Atsuko Nishida
- Writers: Satoshi Tajiri; Ryosuke Taniguchi; Fumihiro Nonomura; Hiroyuki Jinnai
- Composer: Junichi Masuda
- Series: Pokémon
- Platform: Game Boy
- Release: Pocket Monsters Red and Green; JP: February 27, 1996; Pocket Monsters Blue; JP: October 15, 1996 (CoroCoro Comic); JP: October 10, 1999 (retail); Pokémon Red and Blue; NA: September 28, 1998; AU: October 23, 1998; EU: October 5, 1999; Pokémon Yellow; JP: September 12, 1998; AU: September 3, 1999; NA: October 18, 1999; EU: June 16, 2000
- Genre: Role-playing
- Modes: Single-player, multiplayer

Pokémon Red Version and Pokémon Blue Version are 1996 role-playing video games (RPGs) developed by Game Freak and published by Nintendo for the Game Boy. They are the first installments of the Pokémon video game series and were first released in Japan as Pocket Monsters Red (Note: Japanese: ポケットモンスター 赤, Hepburn: Pokettomonsutā Aka) and Pocket Monsters Green, (Note: Japanese: ポケットモンスター 緑, Hepburn: Pokettomonsutā Midori) followed by the special edition Pocket Monsters Blue (Note: Japanese: ポケットモンスター 青, Hepburn: Poketto Monsutā Ao) later that year. The games were released internationally in 1998 and 1999 as Pokémon Red and Pokémon Blue, while an enhanced version, Pokémon Yellow Version: Special Pikachu Edition, (Note: ポケットモンスターピカチュウ, Pokettomonsutā Pikachū; lit. "Pocket Monsters Pikachu") (Note: Often referred to as Pokémon Yellow) was released in Japan in 1998 and in other regions in 1999 and 2000.

The player controls the protagonist from an overhead perspective and navigates the fictional region of Kanto in a quest to master Pokémon battling. The goal is to become the Pokémon League Champion by defeating the eight Gym Leaders and the best Pokémon Trainers in the Kanto Region, the Elite Four. Another objective is to complete the Pokédex, an in-game encyclopedia, by obtaining all 151 Pokémon. Red and Blue use the Game Link Cable, which connects two Game Boy systems and allows Pokémon to be traded or battled between games. Both versions feature the same plot, and while they can be played separately, players must trade between both games to obtain all of the original 151 Pokémon.

Red and Blue were well-received, with critics praising the multiplayer options, especially the concept of trading. They received an aggregated score of 89% on GameRankings and are considered among the greatest games ever made, perennially ranked on top game lists including at least four years on IGN's "Top 100 Games of All Time". The games marked the beginning of a multibillion-dollar franchise, jointly selling over 400 million copies worldwide. The Red and Blue versions were remade for Game Boy Advance (and later the Nintendo Switch for the 30th anniversary) as FireRed and LeafGreen (2004) while Yellow was remade for Nintendo Switch as Let's Go, Pikachu! and Let's Go, Eevee! (2018). The originals were rereleased on the Virtual Console service for the Nintendo 3DS in 2016 to commemorate their twentieth anniversaries.

== Gameplay ==
Pokémon Red and Blue are played in a third-person view, overhead perspective and consist of three basic screens: an overworld, in which the player navigates the main character; a side-view battle screen with turn based attacking; and a menu interface, in which the player may configure their Pokémon, items, or gameplay settings.

The player's Bulbasaur engaged in battle with a Charmander

The player can use their Pokémon to battle other Pokémon. When the player encounters a wild Pokémon or is challenged by a trainer, the screen switches to a turn-based battle screen that displays the two engaged Pokémon. During a battle, the player may choose to fight using one of up to four moves, use an item, switch the active Pokémon, or attempt to flee; however, fleeing is not possible in trainer battles. Pokémon have hit points (HP); when a Pokémon's HP is reduced to zero, it faints and can no longer battle until it is revived, which is done either with an item, or healing at a Pokémon Center, healing centres for injured Pokémon. Once an enemy Pokémon faints, the player's Pokémon that were involved in the battle receive a certain number of experience points (EXP). After accumulating enough EXP, a Pokémon will level up. A Pokémon's level controls its physical properties, such as the battle statistics acquired, and the moves it has learned. Some Pokémon may also evolve at certain levels. These evolutions affect the statistics and the levels at which new moves are learned. Pokémon at higher stages of evolution gain more statistics each time they level up, although they may not learn new moves as early, if at all, compared with the lower stages of evolution.

Catching Pokémon is another essential element. While battling with a wild Pokémon, the player may throw a Poké Ball at it. If the Pokémon is successfully caught, it will come under the player's ownership. Factors in the success rate of capture include the HP of the target Pokémon, whether it is under a status effect, and the type of Poké Ball used: the lower the target's HP, and the stronger the status effect and type of Poké Ball, the higher the success rate of capture. The ultimate goal is to complete the entries in the Pokédex, a comprehensive Pokémon encyclopedia, by capturing, evolving, and trading to obtain all 151 creatures.

Pokémon Red and Blue allow players to trade Pokémon between two cartridges via a Game Link Cable. This method of trading must be done to fully complete the Pokédex since certain Pokémon will only evolve upon being traded and each of the two games have version-exclusive Pokémon. The Link Cable also makes it possible to battle another player's Pokémon team. When playing Red or Blue on a Game Boy Advance or SP, the standard GBA/SP link cable will not work; players must use the Nintendo Universal Game Link Cable instead. Moreover, the English versions are incompatible with their Japanese counterparts, and such trades will corrupt the save files, as the games use different languages and therefore character sets.

As well as trading with each other and Pokémon Yellow, Pokémon Red and Blue can trade Pokémon with the second generation of Pokémon games: Pokémon Gold, Silver, and Crystal. However, there are limitations: the games cannot link if one player's party contains Pokémon or moves introduced in the second generation games. Also, using the Transfer Pak for the Nintendo 64, data such as Pokémon and items from Pokémon Red and Blue can be used in the Nintendo 64 games Pokémon Stadium and Pokémon Stadium 2. Red and Blue are incompatible with the Pokémon games of the later "Advanced Generation" for the Game Boy Advance and GameCube. There have been many remakes and mods of these games, but they still follow the same concept.

=== Bugs and glitches ===
Pokémon Red and Blue are notable for a large quantity of glitches, possibly due to their scope in comparison to Game Freak's development experience at the time. One of the most popular glitches in Red and Blue involves encountering MissingNo. (short for "Missing Number"), a glitch Pokémon with 5 obtainable forms that arise when different glitches are performed. Additionally, several other Pokémon can be encountered using glitches, such as the otherwise-unobtainable Mythical Pokémon Mew. Another glitch, dubbed the "EXP underflow glitch", allows players to manipulate unsigned integers in the game's code for Pokémon in the "medium slow" experience group in order to max out the level of any such Pokémon.

== Plot ==
=== Story ===
The player begins in their hometown of Pallet Town in the Kanto Region (inspired by, but not to be confused with the real life Kantō region of Japan). After venturing alone into the tall grass, the player is stopped by Professor Samuel Oak, a famous Pokémon Researcher. Professor Oak explains to the player that wild Pokémon may be living there and encountering them alone can be very dangerous. He takes the player to his laboratory where the player meets Oak's grandson, a rival aspiring Pokémon Trainer. The player and the rival are both instructed to select a starter Pokémon for their travels out of Bulbasaur, Squirtle and Charmander. Oak's grandson will always choose the Pokémon which is stronger against the player's starting Pokémon. He will then challenge the player to a Pokémon battle with their newly obtained Pokémon and will continue to battle the player at certain points.

While visiting the region's cities, the player will encounter special establishments called Gyms. Inside these buildings are Gym Leaders, each of whom the player must defeat in a Pokémon battle to obtain a total of eight Gym Badges. Once the badges are acquired, the player is given permission to enter the Pokémon League in the Indigo Plateau, which consists of the best Pokémon Trainers in the Kanto Region. There the player will battle the Elite Four and finally the Pokémon League Champion: the player's rival. Throughout, the player battles Team Rocket, a criminal organization that uses the Pokémon for various crimes. They devise numerous plans for stealing rare Pokémon, which the player must foil.

=== Setting ===
Red, Green, and Blue take place in the Kanto Region, based on Japan's real Kantō region.

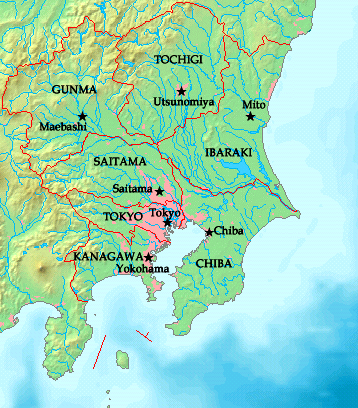
Map of Kantō region, Japan

Pokémon Red and Blue take place in the region of Kanto, which is based on the real-life Kantō region in Japan. This is one distinct region, as shown in later games, with different geographical habitats for the 151 existing Pokémon species, along with human-populated towns, cities, and Routes connecting locations with one another. Some areas are only accessible once the player learns a special ability or gains a special item. Kanto has eleven settlements: Pallet Town, Viridian City, Pewter City, Cerulean City, Vermillion City, Lavender Town, Celadon City, Fuchsia City, Saffron City, Cinnabar Island, and the Indigo Plateau. All of these other than Pallet Town, Lavender Town, and Indigo Plateau have a gym with a leader who serves as a boss, and the battles against the Elite Four and final rival battle occur at Indigo Plateau. Areas in which the player can catch Pokémon range from caves (such as Mt. Moon, Rock Tunnel, Seafoam Islands, and Cerulean Cave) to the sea, where the kinds of Pokémon available to catch varies. For example, Tentacool can only be caught either through fishing or when the player is in a body of water (Routes 19–21), while Zubat can only be caught in caves.

== Development ==
The game developer, Satoshi Tajiri, pitched the concept of Pokémon to Nintendo's staff in 1990 and was met with skepticism. They believed his ideas were too ambitious and found it difficult to see the appeal. However, Shigeru Miyamoto saw great potential in the idea and convinced the company to go ahead with the project.

The initial concept for Pokémon stemmed from the hobby of insect collecting, a popular pastime which Tajiri enjoyed as a child. While growing up, however, he observed more urbanization taking place in the town where he lived and as a result, the insect population declined. Tajiri noticed that kids now played in their homes instead of outside and he came up with the idea of a video game, containing creatures that resembled insects, called Pokémon. He thought kids could relate with the Pokémon by individually naming them and then controlling them to represent fear or anger as a good way of relieving stress. However, Pokémon never bleed nor die in battle, only faint – this was a very touchy subject to Tajiri, as he did not want to further fill the gaming world with "pointless violence".

The concept of trading Pokémon was inspired by a frustrating experience Tajiri had while playing Dragon Quest II: Luminaries of the Legendary Line. Tajiri was attempting to obtain an item that could only be obtained by a rare drop from an enemy, but he was not able to acquire it. Ken Sugimori was also playing Dragon Quest II at the time and was able to acquire two of the rare items. Wishing to obtain Sugimori's extra copy, Tajiri attempted to figure out if it was possible to trade items between games but realized this was not possible on the Famicom. When the Game Boy was released, Tajiri thought the system was perfect for his idea, especially because of the link cable, which he envisioned would allow players to trade Pokémon with each other. This concept of trading information was new to the video game industry because previously connection cables were only being used for competition. "I imagined a chunk of information being transferred by connecting two Game Boys with special cables, and I went wow, that's really going to be something!" said Tajiri. Upon hearing of the Pokémon concept, Shigeru Miyamoto suggested creating multiple cartridges with different Pokémon in each, noting it would assist the trading aspect. Tajiri was also influenced by Square's Game Boy game The Final Fantasy Legend, which he said gave him the idea that more than just action games could be developed for Game Boy.

The main character, Satoshi, was named after Tajiri himself. According to Tajiri, "Basically, he's me as a kid." The rival character, Shigeru, was named after fellow Nintendo developer Shigeru Miyamoto, whom Tajiri regarded as a mentor and role model. Ken Sugimori, an artist and longtime friend of Tajiri, headed the development of drawings and designs of the Pokémon, working with a team of fewer than ten people who conceived the various designs for all 151 Pokémon. Atsuko Nishida created the designs for Pikachu, Bulbasaur, Charmander, Squirtle, and many others. Sugimori, in turn, finalized each design, drawing the Pokémon from various angles in order to assist Game Freak's graphics department in properly rendering the creature.

Originally called Capsule Monsters, the title went through several transitions due to trademark problems, becoming CapuMon and KapuMon before eventually settling upon Pocket Monsters. Tajiri always thought that Nintendo would reject his game, as the company did not really understand the concept at first. However, the games turned out to be a success, something Tajiri and Nintendo never expected, especially because of the declining popularity of the Game Boy.

Tajiri said that the Poké Ball concept was inspired by Ultraseven's Capsule Monsters from the tokusatsu superhero television series Ultraseven (1967–1968). Nintendo spent $13 million marketing Pokémon Red and Blue in the United States.

=== Music ===
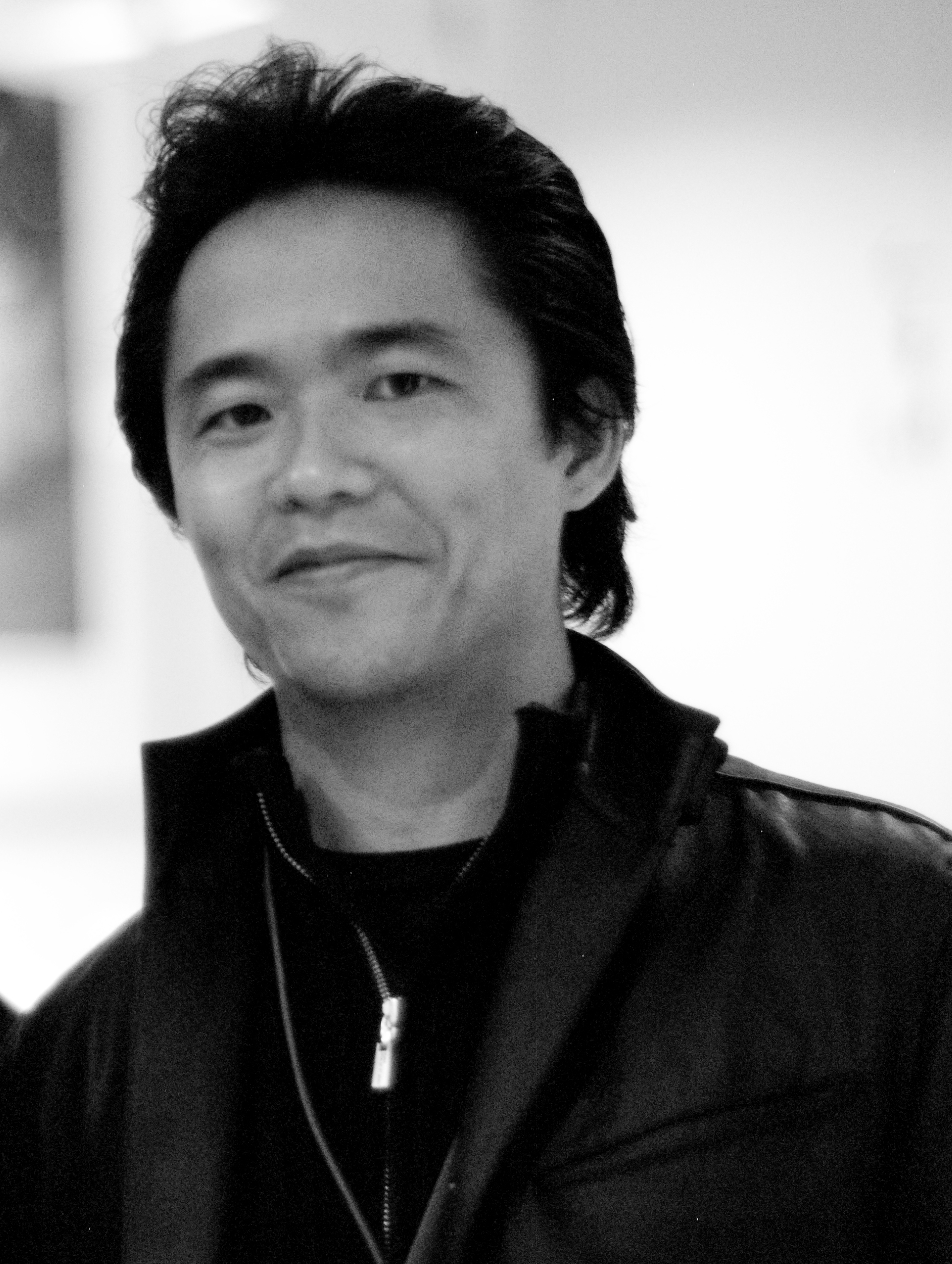
Junichi Masuda (pictured in 2007) composed the music for all versions.

The game's music was composed by Junichi Masuda, who used the four sound channels of the Game Boy to create both the melodies and the sound effects and Pokémon "cries" heard upon encountering them. He composed the opening theme, with battle scenes in mind, using white noise to sound like marching music and imitate a snare drum. Masuda wrote the music at his home on a Commodore Amiga computer, which only features PCM sample playback and converted to the Game Boy with a program he had written.

== Release ==
In Japan, Pocket Monsters Red and Green were the first versions released. Development was completed by October 1995 and release was originally planned for December 21, 1995, but was delayed until February 27, 1996 because the derivative products were not yet ready for sale. After a slow start they continued to sell well. Several months later, Pocket Monsters Blue was released in Japan as a mail-order-only special edition to subscribers of CoroCoro Comic on October 15, 1996. It was later released to general retail on October 10, 1999. It features updated in-game artwork and new dialogue. Using Blastoise as its mascot, the code, script, and artwork for Blue were used for the international releases of Red and Green, which were renamed to Red and Blue.

To create more interest, Tajiri revealed an extra Pokémon called Mew hidden within them, which he believed "created a lot of rumors and myths about the game" and "kept the interest alive". The creature was originally added by Shigeki Morimoto as an internal prank and was not intended to be exposed to consumers. It was not until later that Nintendo decided to distribute Mew through a Nintendo promotional event. However, in 2003, a glitch was discovered which allowed players to obtain Mew without relying on official Nintendo events.

During the North American localization of Pokémon, a small team led by Hiro Nakamura went through the individual Pokémon, renaming them for western audiences based on their appearance and characteristics after approval from Nintendo. In addition, during this process, Nintendo trademarked the 151 Pokémon names in order to ensure they would be unique to the franchise. During the translation process, it became apparent that simply altering the text from Japanese to English was impossible; the games had to be entirely reprogrammed from scratch due to the fragile state of their source code, a side effect of the unusually lengthy development time. Therefore, the games were based on the more modern Japanese version of Blue; modeling its programming and artwork after Blue but keeping the same distribution of Pokémon found in the Japanese Red and Green cartridges.

As the finished Red and Blue versions were being prepared for release, Nintendo allegedly spent over 50 million dollars on promotion, fearing the series would not be appealing to American children. The western localization team warned that the "cute monsters" may not be accepted by American audiences, and instead recommended they be redesigned and "beefed-up". Then-president of Nintendo Hiroshi Yamauchi refused and instead viewed the games' possible reception in America as a challenge to face. Despite these setbacks, the reprogrammed Red and Blue versions with their original creature designs were eventually released in North America on September 28, 1998, over two and a half years after Red and Green debuted in Japan. The games were received extremely well by the foreign audiences and Pokémon went on to become a lucrative franchise in America. The same versions were later released in Australia sometime later in 1998 and in Europe on October 5, 1999, being the second-to-last video game released for the original Game Boy in Europe with Pokemon Yellow Version: Special Pikachu Edition being the last.

In Portugal, Pokémon Red and Pokémon Blue were officially released on October 15, 1999, in the town of Monte Real (Leiria District). Nintendo's local distributor at the time, Concentra, in partnership with the local parish council, represented by Isabel Damasceno, and the mayor of Leiria, Fernando Lopes Jorge, symbolically changed the town's name to "Pokémonte Real" for the day. The launch event, organised by the Lisbon-based agency Bago, included around 50 children from the area and cost 5 thousand contos.

Ricardo Feist, Concentra's marketing director, selected Monte Real due to the similarity between the town's name and the game's title, and also to offer an opportunity to children living outside major urban centres. He also noted that the animated series was already being broadcast on the SIC television network on weekend mornings. He expressed hopes of replicating the success seen in other countries, aiming to sell 50,000 units of Pokémon Red and Pokémon Blue by the end of the year. Concentra also announced merchandising plans and allocated 35 thousand contos to the entire marketing campaign, with the explicit goal of establishing a "Pokémania" in Portugal.

=== Pokémon Yellow ===
Two years after Red, Green and Blue Nintendo released Pokémon Yellow, an enhanced version of Red and Blue, in Japan in 1998, and in North America and Europe in 1999 and 2000. The game was designed to resemble the Pokémon anime series, with the player receiving a Pikachu as their starter Pokémon and their rival starting with an Eevee. Some non-player characters resemble those from the anime, including Team Rocket's Jessie and James.

Pokémon Yellow changes and enhances several aspects of the original games. Pikachu is provided as the player's only starter Pokémon and has a voice (provided by Ikue Ōtani) and a personality unique from other Pokémon. It follows the player on the overworld, and the player can speak to it. Pikachu can grow to love or hate the player based on their actions; leveling up will keep Pikachu happy, while fainting frequently will make it unhappy. This feature was used again in Pokémon HeartGold and SoulSilver, the remakes of Pokémon Gold and Silver, and Pokémon: Let's Go, Pikachu! and Let's Go, Eevee!, the remakes of Pokémon Yellow. Yellow includes a "Pikachu's Beach" minigame that is only accessible to players who either won a Nintendo contest or complete a challenge in another game, Pocket Monsters Stadium or Pokémon Stadium, and exchange data between the games using the Transfer Pak. Yellow has slightly improved graphics and can print Pokédex entries onto stickers using the Game Boy Printer.

Pokémon Yellow was developed by Game Freak and entered development after the completion of the Japanese version of Pokémon Blue. Nintendo may have been considering a "Pokémon Pink" version to accompany Yellow, based on source code leaked from Nintendo.

Pokémon Yellow's release coincided with the release of Pokémon: The First Movie and was first announced as Pocket Monsters Yellow (Note: ポケットモンスター 黄, Poketto Monsutā Ki) in Japan. Future Nintendo president Satoru Iwata later said that people likely felt Yellow would be unnecessary due to the release of Pokémon Gold and Silver later that year. It was released in Japan on September 12, 1998, in Australia on September 3, 1999, in North America on October 19, 1999, and in Europe on June 16, 2000. A Pikachu-themed Game Boy Color bundle was released in North America in October 1999. To promote the release of Pokémon Yellow, Volkswagen and Nintendo created a yellow Volkswagen New Beetle with features inspired by Pikachu. Nintendo World Report listed Pokémon Yellow as one of the notable handheld releases in 1999.

=== Re-releases ===
On the 20th anniversary of the first-generation Pokémon games' Japanese release, in February 2016, Nintendo re-released Red, Blue, and Yellow for their Nintendo 3DS Virtual Console service. The games include a first for the Virtual Console: simulated Link Cable functionality to allow trading and battling between games. As was the case with its original release, Green is exclusive to Japanese consumers. These versions can transfer Pokémon to Pokémon Sun and Moon via the Pokémon Bank application.

A special Nintendo 2DS bundle was released in Japan, Europe, and Australia on February 27, 2016, with each console matching the corresponding color of the game version. North America received a special New Nintendo 3DS bundle with cover plates styled after Red and Blue's box art. By March 31, 2016, combined sales of the re-releases reached 1.5 million copies, with more than half sold in North America.

== Reception ==
=== Reception for Pokémon Red and Blue ===
Reception

Aggregate score
Aggregator	Score
GameRankings	Red: 88%; Blue: 88%; Yellow: 85%

Review scores
Publication	Score
AllGame	Blue: 4.5/5; Yellow: 4/5
Electronic Gaming Monthly	Red, Blue: 9/10, 8/10, 8/10, 9/10; Yellow: 8/10, 6/10, 8/10, 6/10
Famitsu	Red, Green: 8/10, 7/10, 7/10, 7/10
Game Informer	Red, Blue: 9/10; Yellow: 6.5/10
GamePro	Red, Blue: 4.5/5
GameSpot	Blue: 8.8/10; Yellow: 8.9/10
IGN	Red: 10/10; Yellow: 10/10
Nintendo Power	Red, Blue: 7.2/10; Yellow: 8/10
GBOM	Yellow: 95%

Award
Publication	Award
AIAS 2nd Annual Interactive Achievement Awards	Red, Blue: Outstanding Achievement in Character or Story Development

The games received mostly positive reviews, holding an aggregate score of 88% on GameRankings. Special praise was given to its multiplayer features: the ability to trade and battle Pokémon with one another. Craig Harris of IGN gave the games a "masterful" 10 out of 10, noting that: "Even if you finish the quest, you still might not have all the Pokémon in the game. The challenge to catch 'em all is truly the game's biggest draw." He also commented on the popularity, especially among children, describing it as a "craze". GameSpot's Peter Bartholow, who gave the games a "great" 8.8 out of 10, cited the graphics and audio as somewhat primitive but stated that these were the only drawbacks. He praised the replay value due to their customization and variety and commented upon their universal appeal: "Under its cuddly exterior, Pokémon is a serious and unique RPG with lots of depth and excellent multiplayer extensions. As an RPG, the game is accessible enough for newcomers to the genre to enjoy, but it will entertain hard-core fans as well. It's easily one of the best Game Boy games to date".

The success of these games has been attributed to their innovative gaming experience rather than audiovisual effects. Papers published until 1999 by the Columbia Business School indicate both American and Japanese children prefer the actual gameplay of a game over special audio or visual effects. In Pokémon games, the lack of these artificial effects has actually been said to promote the child's imagination and creativity. "With all the talk of game engines and texture mapping and so on, there is something refreshing about this superlative gameplay which makes you ignore the cutesy 8-bit graphics" commented The Guardian.

During the Academy of Interactive Arts & Sciences' 2nd Annual Interactive Achievement Awards, Pokémon Red and Blue won the award for "Outstanding Achievement in Character or Story Development", along with receiving nominations for "Console Game of the Year", "Console Role-Playing Game of the Year", and "Outstanding Achievement in Interactive Design".

=== Reception for Pokémon Yellow ===
Pokémon Yellow has been well received by critics, holding an aggregate score of 85% from GameRankings as their fifth highest-rated Game Boy game of all time. The Sarasota Herald-Tribune recommended Yellow as a good game for children. RPGFan called it "so revoltingly addictive that any player of it has no choice but to 'catch 'em all'". They also called Yellow "insulting" in how limited the additions from Red and Blue were. Giving the game a perfect score, IGN's Craig Harris praised the mechanics, commenting that Yellow was the best game of the three to start with.

GameSpot's Cameron Davis called it a "stopgap" to appease players until the release of Gold and Silver, commenting that "the new challenges are enough to fill the hole – but only just". GameDaily's Chris Buffa listed it as one of the best Pokémon games, commenting that while it was a rehash, there was enough that was new to warrant playing. Allgame's Brad Cook commented that for those who did not play Red and Blue, Yellow was good; but otherwise, he advised that they wait until Gold and Silver. The Daily Telegraph's Steve Boxer commented that while it had good gameplay mechanics, it was held back by the lack of features. He described Nintendo's actions as avaricious, commenting that Yellow "marks the point where Pokémon ceases to become a game and becomes a marketing exercise/obsession-satisfier".

Pokémon Yellow received two nominations, "Game of the Year" and "Console Game of the Year", during the 3rd Annual Interactive Achievement Awards.

=== Sales ===
==== Sales for Pokémon Red and Blue ====
Pokémon Red and Blue set the precedent for what has become a blockbuster, multibillion-dollar franchise. In Japan Red, Green, and Blue sold 1.04 million units combined during 1996, and another 3.65 million in 1997. The latter performance made Pokémon, collectively, the country's best-selling game of the year, surpassing Final Fantasy VII. By 1997, about 7 million units had been sold in Japan. In 1998, Red, Green and Blue sold 1,739,391 units in Japan. By 1998, 10 million units had been sold in Japan. Pokémon Red, Green and Blue ultimately sold 10.23 million copies in Japan, and until November 2022, was the country's best-selling video games. The video games were accompanied by the Pokémon Trading Card Game; both the video games and card game grossed combined sales revenue of more than $4 billion in Japan, as of 2000.

In the United States, it became the fastest-selling Game Boy game, having sold 200,000 copies within two weeks and 4 million units by the end of 1998. Pokémon Blue first appeared within the top 20 best-selling video games in December 1998, with Pokémon Red debuting the following month. For the rest of 1999 (barring September), it stayed within the best-selling video game chart, selling 6.1 million copies in the United States and becoming the best-selling video game of 1999 in the territory. In 2000, it stayed within the top 20 best-selling video game chart up to September. By 2007, it had total combined sales of 9.85 million in the United States. In Europe, the games had grossed €60,388,924 or $64,362,515 (equivalent to $124,000,000 in 2025) in 1999. In France, over 2.5 million copies were sold within a year. In Germany, they became the first video games to receive two Special Prize awards from the Verband der Unterhaltungssoftware Deutschland (VUD) for sales above 2 million copies by early 2001. In the United Kingdom, Red and Blue received two Platinum awards for sales above 600,000 copies.

Worldwide sales reached over 31 million copies sold. It was "the most successful computer game of all time" according to Joseph Tobin in 2004. In 2009, IGN referred to Pokémon Red and Blue as the "Best-selling RPG on the Game Boy" and "Best-selling RPG of all time", while in 2017, Guinness World Records declared the games the "Best-selling videogame (excluding bundle sales)."

==== Sales for Pokémon Yellow ====
In Japan, the game sold 1,549,000 units in 1998, making it the third best-selling video game of 1998 in Japan.

Before its release in North America, Nintendo anticipated that it would make them $75 million in the 1999 holiday season. The Pokémon Yellow Game Boy Color bundle was predicted to be the second-most popular toy of the holiday season. In North America the game received roughly 150,000 pre-orders. The bundle debuted at #2 in video game sales and claimed the #1 spot a week later. The standard cartridge sold over 600,000 units in its first week and one million copies within ten days, becoming the fastest-selling handheld game of all time when it was released. Pokémon: The First Movie, a film released around the same time as Yellow, was expected to give it a sales boost. A Nintendo spokesman attributed the high demand for the Game Boy Color during the Christmas season of 1999 to Yellow. For the month of December, Donkey Kong 64 led Pokémon Yellow and Gran Turismo 2 on the monthly chart.

Gwenn Friss of the Cape Cod Times called it one of the hottest items of the 1999 Christmas season, comparing it to popular Christmas toys from previous years such as Furby and Tickle me Elmo. Thomas Content of USA Today reiterated the comparison, commenting that it was "poised to stomp" them. He added that it, along with Red and Blue, were responsible for the boost of Game Boy sales from 3.5 million in 1998 to 8 million in 1999. The Idaho Statesman called it the "hottest new title for the Game Boy Color". Yellow was the third best-selling video game in North America in 1999, with the other four top spots occupied by other Pokémon games. The demand for Yellow resulted in Target to issue an apology for not being able to meet the "unprecedented demand". CNET-surveyed stores sold out of Yellow. A spokesperson for FuncoLand attributed a drop in sales to shortages of both the Game Boy Color and Pokémon Yellow.

For its European launch, 2 million units were shipped across the continent during June 2000, including 500,000 in the United Kingdom. Yellow became the fastest-selling Pokémon games in the United Kingdom, where it received a Double Platinum award from ELSPA for more than 600,000 sales and grossed more than £20 million or $30,000,000 (equivalent to $56,000,000 in 2025). In Germany, Yellow received a Double Platinum award from the Verband der Unterhaltungssoftware Deutschland (VUD) for sales above 400,000 copies by early 2001.

== Legacy ==
The video game website 1UP.com composed a list of the "Top 5 'Late to the Party' Games" showing selected games that "prove a gaming platform's untapped potential" and were one of the last games released for their respective console. Red and Blue were ranked first and called Nintendo's "secret weapon" when they were released for the Game Boy in the late 1990s. The success revitalized the Game Boy in the late 1990s. Nintendo Power listed the Red and Blue versions together as the third best video game for the Game Boy and Game Boy Color, stating that something kept them playing until they caught every Pokémon. Game Informer's Ben Reeves called them (along with Pokémon Yellow, Gold, Silver, and Crystal) the second best Game Boy games and stated that it had more depth than it appeared. Official Nintendo Magazine placed the Red and Blue versions 52nd on their list of the 100 best Nintendo games of all time. In 2019, PC Magazine named them on their list of "The 10 Best Game Boy Games". In 2023, Time Extension included them on their "Best JRPGs of All Time" list for growing into an international phenomenon and popularizing the monster-catching genre. Red and Blue made number 72 on IGN's "Top 100 Games of All Time" in 2003, in which the reviewers noted that the pair of games "started a revolution" and praised the deep game design and complex strategy, as well the option to trade between other games. Two years later, it climbed to number 70 in the updated list, with the games' legacy again noted to have inspired multiple video game sequels, movies, television shows, and other merchandise, strongly rooting it in popular culture. In 2007, Red and Blue were ranked at number 37 on the list, and the reviewers remarked on their longevity:

For everything that has come in the decade since, it all started right here with Pokémon Red/Blue. Its unique blend of exploration, training, battling and trading created a game that was far more in-depth than it first appeared and one that actually forced the player to socialize with others in order to truly experience all that it had to offer. The game is long, engrossing and sparkles with that intangible addictiveness that only the best titles are able to capture. Say what you will about the game, but few gaming franchises can claim to be this popular ten years after they first hit store shelves.

The games are widely credited with starting and helping pave the way for the successful multi billion-dollar series. Five years after Red and Blue's initial release, Nintendo celebrated its "Pokémonniversary". George Harrison, the senior vice president of marketing and corporate communications of Nintendo of America, stated that "those precious gems [Pokémon Red and Blue] have evolved into Ruby and Sapphire. The release of Pokémon Pinball kicks off a line of great new Pokémon adventures that will be introduced in the coming months". The series has since sold over 300 million games, all accredited to the enormous success of the original Red and Blue versions.

For their depiction of the Pokémon species Jynx, Pokémon Red and Blue were named the 9th most racist video game of all time by Complex.

On February 12, 2014, an anonymous Australian programmer launched Twitch Plays Pokémon, a "social experiment" on the video streaming website Twitch. The project was a crowdsourced attempt to play a modified version of Pokémon Red by typing commands into the channel's chat log, with an average of 50,000 viewers participating at the same time. The result was compared to "watching a car crash in slow motion". The game was completed on March 1, 2014, boasting 390 hours of multi-user controlled non-stop gameplay.

In 2017, The Strong National Museum of Play inducted Pokémon Red and Green to its World Video Game Hall of Fame. In October 2021, the Japan Sumo Association formed a partnership with The Pokémon Company to celebrate the 25th anniversary of Pokémon Red and Blue and gyōji (professional sumo referee) were seen wearing Poké Ball-themed kimono during the January 2022 tournament.

=== Remakes ===
Pokémon FireRed Version (Note: ポケットモンスター ファイアレッド, Poketto Monsutā Faiareddo; lit. "Pocket Monsters FireRed") and Pokémon LeafGreen Version (Note: ポケットモンスター リーフグリーン, Poketto Monsutā Rīfugurīn; lit. "Pocket Monsters LeafGreen") are enhanced remakes of Pokémon Red and Blue. The new games were developed by Game Freak and published by Nintendo for the Game Boy Advance and have compatibility with the Game Boy Advance Wireless Adapter, which originally came bundled with the games. However, due to the new variables added to FireRed and LeafGreen (such as changing the single, "Special" stat into two separate "Special Attack" and "Special Defense" stats), these games are not compatible with older versions outside of the third generation of Pokémon. FireRed and LeafGreen were first released in Japan on January 29, 2004, and released in North America and Europe on September 9 and October 1, 2004 respectively. Nearly two years after their original release, Nintendo re-marketed them as Player's Choice games.

The games received critical acclaim, obtaining an aggregate score of 81 percent on Metacritic. Most critics praised the fact that they introduced new features while still maintaining the traditional gameplay of the series. Reception of the graphics and audio was more mixed, with some reviewers complaining that they were too simplistic and not much of an improvement over the previous games, Pokémon Ruby and Sapphire. FireRed and LeafGreen were commercial successes, selling a total of around 12 million copies worldwide.

Pokémon: Let's Go, Pikachu! (Note: ポケットモンスター Let's Go! ピカチュウ, Poketto Monsutā Let's GO! Pikachū) and Pokémon: Let's Go, Eevee! (Note: ポケットモンスター Let's Go! イーブイ, Poketto Monsutā Let's GO! Ībui) are enhanced remakes of Pokémon Yellow Version, released in November 2018 for the Nintendo Switch. They were aimed at newcomers to the Pokémon series, and incorporate mechanics from Pokémon Go. The games take place in the Kanto region and include only the original 151 Pokémon from the first generation of Pokémon. The ability for Pokémon to accompany the protagonist in the overworld returns, a feature last seen in Pokémon HeartGold and SoulSilver on the Nintendo DS. However, whereas only one Pokémon could be chosen to follow the protagonist previously, they will additionally be accompanied by the starter Pikachu or Eevee in Let's Go, Pikachu! or Let's Go, Eevee!, respectively.

They have combined global sales of over 13 million copies.

=== Related games ===
A Nintendo 64 game, Pocket Monsters Stadium, was released by Nintendo in 1998 exclusively in Japan. It revolves around a 3D turn-based battle system with 40 of the 151 Pokémon featured in Red, Blue, and Yellow. A sequel was released in 1999 both in Japan and the West that includes all 151 Pokémon.
