= Mawile =

Pokémon species

- Pokémon character
- Mawile artwork by Ken Sugimori
- First appearance: Pokémon Ruby and Sapphire (2002)
- Designed by: Ken Sugimori (finalized)

In-universe information
- Species: Pokémon
- Type: Steel and Fairy

Mawile (/ˈmɑːwaɪl/), known in Japan as Kucheat (Japanese: クチート, Hepburn: Kuchīto), is a Pokémon species in Nintendo and Game Freak's Pokémon franchise. First introduced in the video games Pokémon Ruby and Sapphire, the development team wanted to push the concept of what a Pokémon could look like compared to previous installments. After the design was conceived, it was finalized by Ken Sugimori, who added additional details as he felt necessary. Since Mawile's debut, it has appeared in multiple games including Pokémon Go and the Pokémon Trading Card Game, as well as media related to the franchise.

Originally classified as solely a Steel-type Pokémon, Mawile has a short yellow body, cloven feet, black markings on its hands, and a large horn resembling a crocodile maw protruding from the back of its head. This horn can open and bite targets, though despite resembling a mouth lacks a tongue or throat. With Pokémon X and Y, it was reclassified as a Steel- and Fairy-type Pokémon, and also gained a Mega Evolution, Mega Mawile.

Mawile has been mostly well received since its debut, with comparisons being drawn to the yōkai futakuchi-onna. Despite its large mouth-like horn, it has been praised for its cuteness and cited as a Pokémon popular with players, despite its gameplay capabilities being called niche and dismal. The addition of the Fairy-type and Mega Mawile transformation in X and Y were also praised, with USgamer writer Kat Bailey stating that these changes helped both increase its popularity and served as an example of how well Game Freak approached gameplay balance as a company.

== Conception and development ==
In addition to growing a second horn, Mega Mawile is significantly taller and has a secondary coloration on its body. Its movement also becomes more "human-like" due to its longer legs.

Mawile is a species of fictional creatures called Pokémon created for the Pokémon media franchise. Developed by Game Freak and published by Nintendo, the Japanese franchise began in 1996 with the video games Pokémon Red and Green for the Game Boy, which were later released in North America as Pokémon Red and Blue in 1998. In these games and their sequels, the player assumes the role of a Trainer whose goal is to capture and use the creatures' special abilities to combat other Pokémon. Some Pokémon can transform into stronger species through a process called evolution via various means, such as exposure to specific items. Each Pokémon has one or two elemental types, which define its advantages and disadvantages when battling other Pokémon. A major goal in each game is to complete the Pokédex, a comprehensive Pokémon encyclopedia, by capturing, evolving, and trading with other Trainers to obtain individuals from all Pokémon species.

Originally called Kucheat in Japan, it was introduced in the 2002 sequels Pokémon Ruby and Sapphire. When designing the games, Game Freak initially wanted to not include any of the Pokémon from the previous games, with lead artist Ken Sugimori using this as an opportunity to push the concept of what a Pokémon could look like. To this end, he wanted to try more "humanoid" designs and also emphasize "cooler" ones, due to feedback the team had received that Pokémon was seen as too "babyish". Additionally, while the previous Pokémon Gold and Silver species were bound to simplistic designs for the sake of the related anime and toy manufacturing, Sugimori stated in an interview he said "screw it" and focused on more complex and fleshed out designs with these games. As the art team developed the Pokémon species, Sugimori would finalize their work and draw the promotional art, altering details as he felt necessary.

In July 2026, an unused Pokémon design speculated to be a member of Mawile's evolutionary line was uncovered. Intended for inclusion in the games Pokémon Diamond and Pearl, it appeared amongst footage of other early Pokémon designs in an internal DVD documentary that detailed the development process behind the games.

=== Design ===
Standing 2 feet (61 cm) tall, Mawile is a bipedal creature with a yellow body, with its legs flaring outward and stopping just before its feet. It has three-digit black hands with the coloration extending up to the elbows, while its feet are cloven hooves. It has large pink eyes, while the hair on its head resembles a bowl cut hairstyle with two tufts of hair extending downward on each side of its brow. A large black horn extends from the back of its head resembling a crocodile maw, with visible white teeth and a yellow spot on the upper middle. Mawile is able to open and close the horn revealing a pink interior; in this manner, the horn can act as a secondary mouth to bite objects. Despite its appearance, this horn is not a real mouth, with the developers clarifying in production notes it lacks a throat, tongue, and spittle. When introduced in Ruby and Sapphire, Mawile was originally classified as a Steel-type Pokémon. With the later games Pokémon X and Y it gained a secondary typing, now classified as a Steel- and Fairy-type Pokémon. Despite having a feminine appearance, Mawile is a gendered species and subjects of it can either be male or female.

X and Y also introduced Mega Evolutions that allow certain Pokémon to temporarily transform through the use of in-game items. In Mawile's case, it can become Mega Mawile, which gains additional height and now stands 3 ft 3 in (99 cm) tall while gaining considerable attack power. It gains an additional horn maw, each now protruding from the sides of its head and having a more rugged appearance. Mega Mawile's body also gains a secondary coloration, with pink coloring now extending up its legs to just above its waist, while its arms now flare out just before its hands like sleeves and gain a pink coloration.

== Appearances ==
First found in Pokémon Ruby and Sapphire, Mawile appears in several other entries. In multiple games in the Pokémon franchise, Mawile is only capturable in one version of the paired entries, including Ruby, Sword, and Brilliant Diamond. In Pokémon X and Y and onward until the release of Sword and Shield, Mawile can transform into a form called Mega Mawile while it is holding a Mawilite in-game item. In Sword and Shield, it is used by Gym Leader Opal, a Trainer that acts as a boss the player must defeat to proceed. In Pokémon Scarlet and Violet, it is one of many previously introduced Pokémon excluded. Mawile also appears in spin-off games in the franchise, including titles such as New Pokémon Snap, the Pokémon Mystery Dungeon series, and Pokémon Go, with Mega Mawile available in the latter two. In physical media, both Mawile and Mega Mawile have appeared in the Pokémon Trading Card Game.

Mawile also appears in the related anime. In particular it appears in the episode Once in a Mawile, where it is enamored with Lombre, a Pokémon belonging to recurring character Brock. Lombre initially shows no interest in Mawile until it evolves into Ludicolo. However, Mawile now has no interest in it and moves on to give another Pokémon its affections, much to Ludicolo's surprise.

== Critical reception ==
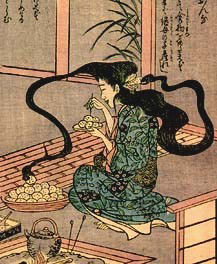
Mawile's design is believed to have taken inspiration from Futakuchi-onna, a mythical Japanese yōkai of a woman with a mouth on the back of her head beneath her hair.

Mawile has been mostly well received since its debut. The staff of Inside cited Mawile alongside the Pokémon Gardevoir as examples of Pokémon that stood out amongst the Ruby and Sapphire's cast for how cute they were, something they felt took players by surprise especially after the realization they were not strictly female. While they emphasized its cute appearance was meant as a trap for it to get food, calling its nature "truly frightening" and "unbearable", they observed Mawile was still one of the most popular and desired Pokémon by players. Carolyn Gudmundson in a podcast for GamesRadar+ meanwhile praised it as "one of those Pokémon that's more interesting from a design and story perspective than from [...] a battling perspective". She felt it was a fan favorite despite what she considered "dismal" gameplay, and enjoyed its presentation in the anime. Co-host Henry Gilbert offered his own input, enjoying the contrast between Mawile's creepy "jaw ponytail" and more cute front. Cian Maher in articles for USA Today meanwhile expressed that the character's strengths were in its design, stating that "it's still extremely cool" that for decades people had assumed the snout-like horn on the back of its head was its true face, while its real face was "actually really lovely", and praised how its lore-based design helped make it believable as something people could encounter in the real world.

IGN in their "Pokémon of the Day" series of articles expressed that Mawile had become one of their favorite Pokémon, calling it "adorable yet exceedingly tough, evil", and "reminiscent" of Cubone, due to both "sporting a large and bulky headpiece". They were surprised that it did not have more fans at the time due to its Steel typing, something that had been requested for some time by players. They stated that while it was not one of the strongest Pokémon in the franchise, they felt it was underappreciated and added it "has a certain specific role to fill", and that it "fills it exceptionally well". Kotaku's Zack Zwiezen was critical of its design, calling it "terrible looking". Though he praised the design of its rear mouth, he felt that its "little, weird body" was uninteresting and felt that it was as if another character design had been spliced to the larger maw. Despite his criticisms, he felt its gimmick was cool and appreciated the lore aspects, though expressed that for the size of its horn he expected Mawile to have a more muscular design due to how easily it carried around its weight. He discussed the fandom surrounding the character, including fan art, which he remarked made it hard to find an image due to the propensity of not safe for work content.

Kat Bailey in an article for USgamer cited Mawile as an example of the improvements Pokémon X and Y brought to the games and refreshed the feel of older Pokémon. Calling it "once a bit of filler" from Ruby and Sapphire "with the misfortune of having a set of jaws straight out of The Little Shop of Horrors", she felt the addition of its Fairy typing and Mega Evolution helped increase its popularity. She also emphasized how the improvements felt tailored to the character, stating that Mawile was "emblematic" of a "nuanced" approach Game Freak appeared to be taking to balance its games, one focusing on giving the characters the tools they need rather than sweeping buffs or debuffs. She further felt that Mega Mawile "represents everything Pokémon X and Y is trying to accomplish." Cian Maher in his own articles meanwhile stated that despite the improvements, offering his own praise for its Mega Evolution as one of the best of the franchise and its "fascinatingly niche strategic values", he felt Mawile had become forgotten, even in light of its usage in titles such as Mystery Dungeon and New Pokémon Snap. He attributed some of this to the discrepancy between its design and its Steel- and Fairy-typing, and argued that its "earthy colouration and weird snout with too many teeth" made it appear more in line with the appearance of Ground- and Dark-type Pokémon in the franchise.

Mawile's basis has been suggested to be that of the Futakuchi-onna, a mythical Japanese yōkai described as a woman who has a second mouth on the back of her head beneath her hair. Lucas Sullivan of GamesRadar+ observed this correlation, describing Mawile's design as "as macabre as it gets [...] somehow balanced between nightmarish and adorable", and questioned how such a design seemingly based on the yōkai made it into the Nintendo-produced game. Author Kate Hodges in the book Warriors, Witches, Women praised how well Mawile illustrated the concept in the Pokémon franchise, stating that "even her name echoes that of a gaping orifice."
