= Pokkén Tournament =

2015 video game

- Promotional art used in Wii U version's cover art depicting Pikachu and Lucario in its mega-evolved form
- Developer: Bandai Namco Studios
- Publishers: JP: Bandai Namco Entertainment (arcade release); JP: The Pokémon Company (consoles); WW: Nintendo (consoles)
- Director: Haruki Suzaki
- Producers: Masaaki Hoshino; Katsuhiro Harada
- Designer: Yasuhito Kobayashi
- Programmer: Sei Nakatani
- Artists: Hiroyasu Hosoya; Hiromi Watanabe
- Composers: Hiroki Hashimoto: Hiroyuki Kawada; Rio Hamamoto; Taku Inoue; Eriko Sakurai; Yoshinori Hirai; Takafumi Sato; Mitsuhiro Kitadani; Yu Sugimoto; Shota Kageyama
- Series: Pokémon; Tekken
- Platforms: Arcade; Wii U Nintendo Switch
- Release: Arcade: JP: July 16, 2015; Wii U: WW: March 18, 2016; Nintendo Switch: WW: September 22, 2017
- Genre: Fighting
- Modes: Single-player, multiplayer

Pokkén Tournament (Note: Japanese: ポッ拳 POKKÉN TOURNAMENT, Hepburn: Pokken Tōnamento) is a 2015 fighting video game developed by Bandai Namco Entertainment. The game combines gameplay elements from Bandai Namco's Tekken series and other fighting games, such as 3D and 2D movement, with characters from the Pokémon franchise. It was released for Japanese arcades in July 2015 and worldwide for the Wii U in March 2016. An enhanced port for the Nintendo Switch, Pokkén Tournament DX, was released in September 2017. The arcade version was published by Bandai Namco, the Japanese console versions were published by The Pokémon Company, and the console versions outside of Japan were published by Nintendo.

== Gameplay ==
Pikachu hitting Weavile with his Burst Attack in the Nintendo Switch version

Pokkén Tournament is a fighting game in which two fighters battle against each other using various Pokémon, with gameplay shifting between "Field Phase" where the Pokémon move freely around the arena similar to Power Stone and Naruto: Ultimate Ninja Storm, and "Duel Phase" where they move relative to each other similar to the Tekken games. Unlike most arcade fighting games, which use a traditional joystick and buttons, the arcade version is played using console-style controllers, which are designed so that players who are not used to arcade sticks can get into the game more easily.

The game focuses more on action, as opposed to the more technical gameplay of Tekken, allowing both hardcore and casual fans to enjoy it. As such, players can perform various techniques taken from the Pokémon series, such as special moves and Mega Evolutions (which can be built up from attacks using a "Synergy Gauge"). Players can also use Support Pokémon to give them special benefits such as buffs in attack or defense.

First-print Wii U copies of the game were packaged with a Shadow Mewtwo Amiibo card, which immediately unlocked the character for use. The title also features online play, where players can compete in two types of online battle modes called friendly battles and ranked battles, including matches between players with registered friend codes and players who enter the same VS Code as each other.

== Pokémon ==
Across all versions of the game, there are 23 different Pokémon that appear as playable fighters, 16 of which appear in all three versions.

- Aegislash (Note: Switch only) (Note: DLC character (Switch))
- Blastoise
- Blaziken
- Braixen (Note: Post-release addition (arcade))
- Chandelure
- Charizard
- Croagunk (Note: Arcade and Switch only)
- Darkrai
- Decidueye
- Empoleon
- Garchomp
- Gardevoir
- Gengar
- Lucario
- Machamp
- Mewtwo
- Pikachu
- Pikachu Libre
- Sceptile
- Scizor
- Shadow Mewtwo (Note: Boss character)
- Suicune
- Weavile

== Development ==
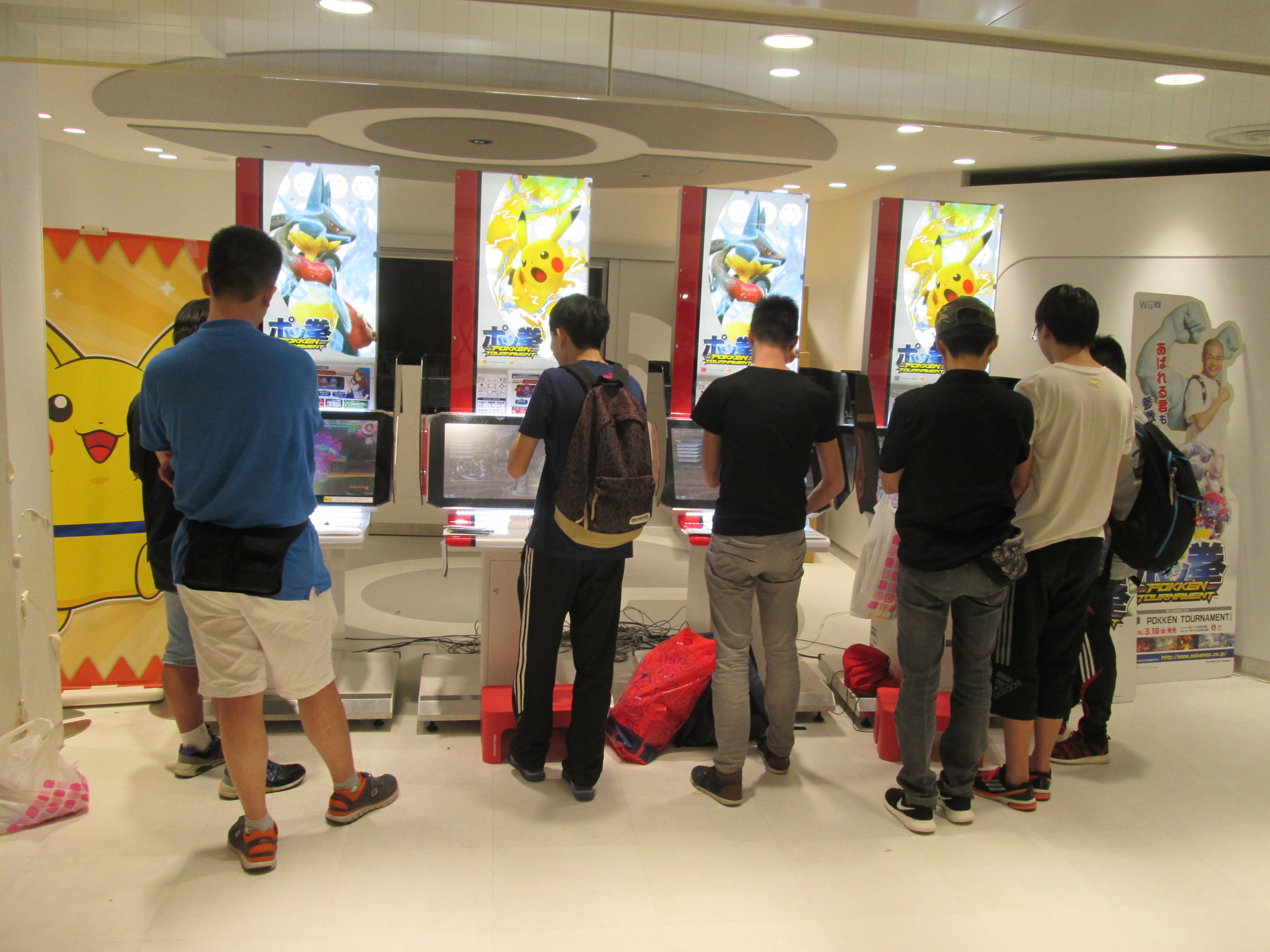
People playing Pokkén Tournament in Sunshine City, Tokyo

Pokkén Tournament was first teased during a Pokémon Game Show event held in Japan in August 2013, with trademarks for the game filed the same month. It was officially announced at an event held by Famitsu on August 26, 2014. The Pokémon Company CEO Tsunekazu Ishihara, Tekken series producer Katsuhiro Harada, and Soulcalibur producer Masaaki Hoshino attended the event, which was broadcast on Niconico, stating the collaboration came about from brainstorming ideas of new ways to play Pokémon.

The title, Pokkén (Japanese: ポッ拳, Hepburn: Pokken), is a portmanteau of Pokémon (Note: Japanese: ポケモン, Hepburn: Pokemon) and Tekken. (Note: Japanese: 鉄拳, Hepburn: Tekken; lit.: "Iron Fist") The Japanese characters ポッ拳 appear in the game's logo in both the Japanese version and the localized versions released in North America and Europe. The official German-language title of the game is Pokémon Tekken. The title change may be due to the similarity between Pokkén and the German word for smallpox, Pocken.

As the game was being developed, Ishihara wanted to feature primarily fighting-type Pokémon in the game, but Hoshino pushed back, and the game was released with Pokémon of many different types featured.

At the 2015 Pokémon World Championships, it was announced that the game would be coming to the Wii U. A demo of the game was available for attendees to play at the tournament. In December 2015, Hori announced that a dedicated arcade controller would be released alongside the game in Japan. The game is known as Pokémon Tekken in Germany and Austria. In April 2016, Nintendo announced that another controller, inspired by Pikachu, would be released in Japan in June. In May 2016, GameStop announced that the Pikachu controller would be released in North America in August of that year in "limited quantities".

In June 2017, an enhanced Nintendo Switch port was announced under the title Pokkén Tournament DX, which was released worldwide on September 22, 2017. The port includes the last four fighters added in the arcade version, along with an additional exclusive fighter and new game modes. In January 2018, two DLC packs were announced for the DX version. In Pack One, Aegislash is a fighter along with Mega Rayquaza and Mimikyu as support Pokémon, which was released on January 31, 2018. In Pack Two, Blastoise is a fighter along with Mew and Celebi as support Pokémon, which was released on March 23, 2018.

In January 2021, Harada, in a response to a follower on Twitter, stated that while he would like to make a sequel to Pokkén, it was up to Nintendo and The Pokémon Company to decide.

== Reception ==
Reception

Aggregate scores
| Aggregator | Score | |
| Aggregator | NS | Wii U |
|---|---|---|
| Metacritic | 79/100 | 76/100 |
| OpenCritic | 77% recommend | N/A |

Review scores
| Publication | Score | |
| Publication | NS | Wii U |
|---|---|---|
| 4Players | 70/100 | 62/100 |
| Destructoid | 7.5/10 | 7.5/10 |
| Edge | N/A | 6/10 |
| Electronic Gaming Monthly | 3/5 | 7/10 |
| Eurogamer | N/A | Recommended |
| Game Informer | N/A | 7/10 |
| GameRevolution | N/A | 4/5 |
| GameSpot | N/A | 9/10 |
| GamesRadar+ | N/A | 3/5 |
| GamesTM | N/A | 7/10 |
| Hardcore Gamer | 4/5 | 4/5 |
| IGN | 8/10 | 8/10 |
| Nintendo Life | 9/10 | 9/10 |
| Nintendo World Report | 8.5/10 | 7.5/10 |
| Shacknews | 7/10 | 6/10 |
| USgamer | N/A | 3/5 |

Amusement Fantasista, a video arcade in Kurashiki, Japan, planned to remove Pokkén Tournament machines in November 2015 due to lack of profitability. Chris Carter of Destructoid noted that in the arcade version, one game credit could last a player 45 minutes, yielding low profits for each machine. The Wii U version entered the Media Create sales charts as the highest-selling game in the region during its debut week, with 69,675 copies sold, and was credited for a marked increase in Wii U hardware sales in the same period; 13,000 units sold compared to the previous week's 4,000. The Switch version of Pokkén Tournament sold 53,395 copies within its first week on sale in Japan, which placed it at number one on the all format sales chart.

Western reviews of the console version were mostly positive, earning a 76 out of 100 average score from aggregate review website Metacritic. In the United States, the NPD Group reported that Pokkén Tournament outsold Street Fighter V by the end of April 2016. In August 2016, Bandai Namco announced that the game had shipped over one million copies worldwide.

Pokkén Tournament was nominated for Best Fighting Game at The Game Awards 2016, as well as Fighting Game of the Year at the 20th Annual D.I.C.E. Awards.

The Nintendo Switch version received similar or slightly better reviews than the Wii U version, with praise towards the new characters and new modes, but criticising the new split screen mode, which had framerate issues. It had sold over a million copies by March 2018.
