= Blaziken =

Pokémon species

- Pokémon character
- Blaziken artwork by Ken Sugimori
- First appearance: Pop Goes the Sneasel (2002)
- Created by: Ken Sugimori
- Voiced by: English: Darren Dunstan (2003–2005); James Carter Cathcart (2006–2025); Japanese: Katsuyuki Konishi (2003–2008); Susumu Chiba (Destiny Deoxys); Kensuke Sato (2013–present)

In-universe information
- Species: Pokémon
- Type: Fire and Fighting

Blaziken (/ˈbleɪzəkən/), known as Bursyamo (Japanese: バシャーモ, Hepburn: Bashāmo) in Japan, is a Pokémon species in Nintendo and Game Freak's Pokémon media franchise, and the evolved form of Combusken, which evolves from Torchic. It first appears in the Pokémon: Master Quest anime episode Pop Goes the Sneasel. It is later available in Pokémon Ruby and Sapphire, with Torchic being one of the first Pokémon available to the player. Since their initial appearance, they have appeared in multiple games including Pokémon Go and the Pokémon Trading Card Game, as well as various merchandise. It is classified as both a Fire and Fighting-type Pokémon, and is given a new form called Mega Blaziken in Pokémon X and Y.

Blaziken was the first design created for Ruby and Sapphire, designed by Ken Sugimori who intended to see if people would accept a humanoid Pokémon. It was also intended to be seen as an ugly Pokémon, meant to reference colored chicks once they grow up. It is capable of fighting with kicks and punches, creating fire from its wrists and jumping large distances. It appears in the Pokémon TV series before the release of Ruby and Sapphire, and the character May eventually obtained one through evolving her Starter Pokémon.

Blaziken has received generally positive reception, praised for being a particularly good Pokémon and noted by multiple critics as being a dominant force in competitive battles, to the point that it was banned in some competitive formats. It is credited with having popularized Fire/Fighting-type Pokémon, which became controversial due to the next two Fire Starter Pokémon, Infernape and Emboar, being Fire/Fighting type as well.

== Conception and development ==
Blaziken is a fictional species of Pokémon created for the Pokémon franchise. Developed by Game Freak and published by Nintendo, the series began in Japan in 1996 with the release of the video games Pokémon Red and Blue for the Game Boy. In these games, the player assumes the role of a Pokémon Trainer whose goal is to capture and train Pokémon. Players use the creatures' special abilities to combat other Pokémon, and some can transform into stronger species through a process called evolution via various means, such as exposure to specific items.

Blaziken was the first design created for Pokémon Ruby and Sapphire, with artist Ken Sugimori intending to see if people be okay with a humanoid Pokémon or would instead just put it in the box when they get it. They wanted to "weaken the idea of what can't be a Pokémon". When designing Blaziken and its first two forms, Torchic and Combusken, artist Ken Sugimori made Torchic orange to resemble a colored chick. He stated that a lot of people his age had a colored chick and experienced them growing up to become "something fierce and hard to look at", which they wanted to reflect in the line's design. An earlier design had elements of Blaziken combined with elements of Latias. The design's sprite was later leaked in 2024, where it was originally a separate Pokémon and was named 'Elhawk' at Index #339. (エルホーク) Developer feedback noted that it looked more like an evolution of Delibird. Later concept art from March 2002, shows it was modified into a design which more looks like the final version. It also shows that this design wasn't an earlier design, instead this was a scrapped Pokémon entirely as its internal data was overwritten by Blaziken later on.

Blaziken is a chicken-like Pokémon that stands on two legs. It has primarily red feathers with yellow feathers on its legs and chest, as well as hair-like feathers on its head. Blaziken is capable of releasing flames from its wrists, attacking with kicks and punches. Its legs are strong, capable of making large leaps. In Pokémon X and Y, a transformation was introduced called Mega Evolution that allows certain Pokémon to transform into a new form, including Blaziken. These forms have various differences from their original forms, which includes new types, stat increases, and/or new abilities. Per battle, a Pokémon Trainer can only Mega Evolve one Pokémon. For nearly all Pokémon, a Pokémon can only Mega Evolve if it is holding a specific Mega Stone that corresponds to it. In Blaziken's case, it must hold the stone "Blazikenite". In this form, Blaziken gains black feathers on its legs, losing its yellow feathers. It also has flames streaming from its wrists.

== Appearances ==
Blaziken first appeared in Pokémon Ruby and Sapphire, being the evolved form of the Starter Pokémon Torchic, which is the Fire-type starter of the games' Hoenn region (alongside the Grass-type Treecko and Water-type Mudkip). Blaziken, along with its earlier stages, have appeared in multiple mainline games following it. In the games Pokémon X and Y, Blaziken was one of multiple Pokémon to receive a new form called Mega Evolution that changes aspects of the Pokémon. It later appeared with this Mega Evolution in Pokémon Omega Ruby and Alpha Sapphire, in which players could receive its Mega Stone as part of a distribution event. It was excluded from Pokémon Sword and Shield until the Crown Tundra portion in the Pokémon Sword and Shield Expansion Pass. It was also not obtainable in Pokémon Scarlet and Violet until the release of The Indigo Disk in the expansion, The Hidden Treasure of Area Zero. It and its Mega Evolved form appear in both Pokémon Go and the Pokémon Trading Card Game.

Blaziken appears in multiple side games, including Pokémon Mystery Dungeon, where Torchic is available as one of multiple Starter Pokémon the player may choose to control or partner with. It also appears as part of a duo with May, the female protagonist in Pokémon Ruby and Sapphire, in Pokémon Masters EX. Blaziken is available in multiple competitive games, including the fighting game Pokkén Tournament and Pokémon Unite.

Blaziken appears in the Pokémon TV series, and was among the first Pokémon revealed in the show from Ruby and Sapphire. Harrison, a trainer in Pokémon: Master Quest episode "Pop Goes the Sneasel", owns a Blaziken as his first Pokémon. The character May obtained Torchic from Professor Birch as her Starter Pokémon, which begins as "inexperienced, ditzy, and prone to panic" until it became more competitive when it evolves into Combusken, which she often used in Pokémon Contests. Combusken later evolved into Blaziken, becoming more powerful and stoic.

== Critical reception ==
Mega Blaziken was received positively and was considered one of the most powerful Pokémon in the franchise

Blaziken has been generally well received. USgamer writer Kat Bailey, despite begrudging Game Freak for making Blaziken the premier Fire-and-Fighting Pokémon, regarded it as one of the best Pokémon species. She called it an iconic Pokémon from the third generation, feeling it was among the best examples of the design philosophy of Ruby and Sapphire, which involved "sharp angles and clean lines that make it stand apart from the more naturalistic monsters of the first two generations". Nintendo Blast writer Rafael Neves felt that it was among the very best final forms for a Starter Pokémon, attributing the rise of Fire-and-Fighting Pokémon to it. Neves considered its Mega form one of the best, feeling that its new design made it worth using despite not having major changes like its ability or typing. ComicBook.com writer Megan Peters noted that, despite the intention to make Blaziken "hard to look at" compared to Torchic, Blaziken was "perfect in its own right", having developed a fan following. IGN writer Audrey Drake felt disappointed with Torchic's evolution into Blaziken; she felt lukewarm toward Torchic, but found Blaziken's design "terrible" and first starter she "actively disliked". Vice writer Sarah Kurchak compared Blaziken's fighting style to Muay Thai and kickboxing, noting that these were the most similar to these fighting styles despite effectively using 12 limbs to fight when the fire from its wrists and ankles are counted. Dot Esports writer Emily Morrow also praised it, considering it the best Fire and Fighting-type Pokémon. She stated that she held a soft spot for it due to Torchic being one of her first starter Pokémon, as well as how strong it was.

Blaziken has been noted for its competitive viability, with Paste writers Kevin Slackie and Moises Taveras noting that its Mega Evolution was a large part of why Blaziken became powerful enough to be counted among the most powerful Pokémon ever. Comic Book Resource writer Adam Aguilar noted how competitively overwhelming Blaziken's Mega Evolution was, but argued that even without its Mega Evolution, its Hidden Ability of Speed Boost and use of the move Protect - which protects Blaziken from most moves - made it too powerful, leading to it being banned. Dot Esports writer Darren Miller considered Blaziken one of the best starter Pokémon, owing its popularity to its high attack power moves and its ability Speed Boost and stated that it was a great sweeper Pokémon, capable of taking out an entire team of Pokémon.

TechRaptor writer Robert Grosso considered Blaziken as the best Fire/Fighting Starter Pokémon versus Infernape and Emboar on multiple levels, also regarding it as among the best-designed Pokémon of the third generation. They enjoyed its real-world inspirations, including its basis on the Shamo chicken and the fire aspect coming from a fire-breathing chicken in Japanese mythology called Basan. A highlight of the design for Grosso was how "simple and referential" it was; he compared it to Gengar, saying that both have a simple concept that is easily discerned visually. In addition to its design, he considered it a strong Pokémon due to its speed and strength that caused it to be banned on the Smogon battle format. GamesBeat writer Jeff Grubbs stated that while he enjoyed Torchic, he was less fond of Blaziken. Fellow GamesBeat writer Mike Minotti enjoyed Torchic and Blaziken, feeling like Blaziken was the beginning of a trend where Pokémon become looking more human-like. As part of their "Pokémon of the Day" series, IGN staff felt that, at the time of Ruby and Sapphire, Torchic was the first time there was one Starter Pokémon that was such a clear-cut favorite, attributing this to Blaziken, particularly its Fire/Fighting type, which they considered a strange type combination. Despite having a preference for Numel and Breloom as Fire and Fighting types respectively, the author still considered Blaziken great. USA Today writer Cian Maher felt it was both one of the best Fire-type and Starter Pokémon, believing it was also good enough to be among the best Pokémon. He cited multiple factors, including the introduction of the Fire/Fighting type combination and competitive viability so good that it got banned in competitive play.
