= Gardevoir =

Pokémon species

- Pokémon character
- Gardevoir artwork by Ken Sugimori
- First appearance: Pokémon Ruby and Sapphire (2002)
- Designed by: Ken Sugimori (finalized)
- Voiced by: English: Michele Knotz; Japanese: Kei Shindō; Kana Hanazawa (Poketoon)

In-universe information
- Species: Pokémon
- Type: Psychic and Fairy

Gardevoir (/ˈɡɑːrdəvwɑːr/), known in Japan as Sirnight (Japanese: サーナイト, Hepburn: Sānaito), is a Pokémon species in Nintendo and Game Freak's Pokémon franchise. First introduced in the video games Pokémon Ruby and Sapphire, the development team wanted to push the concept of what a Pokémon could look like compared to previous installments. After the design was conceived, it was finalized by Ken Sugimori, who added additional details as he felt necessary. Since Gardevoir's debut, it has appeared in multiple games including Pokémon Go and the Pokémon Trading Card Game, as well as various merchandise. In media related to the franchise, Gardevoir has been voiced by various voice actors, including Michele Knotz and Kei Shindō.

Gardevoir has a white and green body with green hair in the shape of a bobcut, and a pink horn protruding from its chest and back. It has a figure resembling a flowing dress, creating a feminine appearance. Originally classified as solely a Psychic-type Pokémon, it is the evolved form of Kirlia and the final evolution of Ralts. With Pokémon X and Y, it was reclassified as a Psychic- and Fairy-type Pokémon, and also gained a Mega Evolution, Mega Gardevoir.

Gardevoir has been well received since its debut, and regarded as one of the franchise's best designs, though some have criticized its appearance for being too similar to a human woman. Despite being a gendered species, it has come to be regarded by many as typically female by the Pokémon fandom, who have produced a large number of fan works related to the character illustrating its popularity. Many of these are of erotic nature, with unlicensed games using it in a similar capacity. In response, several media outlets and studies have either expressed their dismay at Gardevoir's association with such works, or attempted to analyze the reasons for it.

== Conception and development ==
Gardevoir is a species of fictional creatures called Pokémon created for the Pokémon media franchise. Developed by Game Freak and published by Nintendo, the Japanese franchise began in 1996 with the video games Pokémon Red and Green for the Game Boy, which were later released in North America as Pokémon Red and Blue in 1998. In these games and their sequels, the player assumes the role of a Trainer whose goal is to capture and use the creatures' special abilities to combat other Pokémon. Some Pokémon can transform into stronger species through a process called evolution via various means, such as exposure to specific items. Each Pokémon has one or two elemental types, which define its advantages and disadvantages when battling other Pokémon. A major goal in each game is to complete the Pokédex, a comprehensive Pokémon encyclopedia, by capturing, evolving, and trading with other Trainers to obtain individuals from all Pokémon species.

When designing the 2002 sequels Pokémon Ruby and Sapphire, Game Freak initially wanted to not include any of the Pokémon from the previous games, with lead artist Ken Sugimori using this as an opportunity push the concept of what a Pokémon could look like. To this end, he wanted to try more "humanoid" designs, but also wanted to emphasize "cooler" designs, due to feedback the team had received that Pokémon was seen as too "babyish". Additionally, while the previous Pokémon Gold and Silver were bound to simplistic designs for the sake of the related anime and toy manufacturing, Sugimori stated in an interview he said "screw it" and focused on more complex and fleshed out designs with these games. As the art team developed the Pokémon species, Sugimori would finalize their work and draw the promotional art, altering details as he felt necessary. In Japanese the species is called Sirnight in reference to its protective nature. In English localizations it was renamed Gardevoir, a combination of the French terms "garde" meaning guard and "voir" meaning to see, alluding to its nature as a psychic protector.

=== Design ===
Introduced in Ruby and Sapphire, Gardevoir is the third and final part of the species' evolution line. Starting as the Pokémon Ralts which evolves into Kirlia once it has obtained enough experience points, Kirlia in turn can evolve into Gardevoir through the same means. Gardevoir stands 5 feet 3 inches (160 cm) tall and appears as a slender, bipedal creature with red eyes and a mostly white body, save for its green arms and shoulders. The green hair atop its head extends behind its neck and ends in an angled point between its eyes, right above its mouth, while white spiked protrusions extend from the sides of its face. Its skin extends to form a gown shape with a green interior over its legs, and a red horn extends from the center of both its chest and back. An alternately colored "shiny" variation of Gardevoir also exists with similar colorings and design, with the green on its body and hair replaced with teal. Despite having a feminine appearance, Gardevoir is a gendered species and subjects of it can either be male or female.

When introduced in Ruby and Sapphire, Gardevoir was originally classified as a Psychic-type Pokémon. With the later games Pokémon X and Y it gained a secondary typing, now classified as a Psychic- and the newly-added Fairy-type Pokémon. X and Y also introduced Mega Evolutions that allow certain Pokémon to temporarily transform through the use of in-game items, with Gardevoir being able to transform into Mega Gardevoir. In this state the lower part of its body now resembles a ball gown with white sleeve-like extensions covering its arms. Meanwhile, its front chest horn is now split vertically, and both it and the protrusions on the side of its head extend farther. Compared to its original counterpart, the shiny variation has a more distinct color variation, retaining the hair color of the original's variant but with the arms and body resembling a black ball gown with matching sleeves.

== Appearances ==
First introduced in Pokémon Ruby and Sapphire, Gardevoir and its evolutionary line have since appeared in every mainline Pokémon game. In Pokémon X and Y and onward until the release of Pokémon Sword and Shield, Gardevoir can transform into a form called Mega Gardevoir while it is holding a Gardevoirite in-game item, Gardevoir can mega evolve exclusively in games where mega evolution is available. Gardevoir was also featured as a major character in Pokémon Mystery Dungeon: Blue Rescue Team and Red Rescue Team, where one guides the player in visions. This Gardevoir is later revealed to have died due to the selfish actions of its Trainer, leaving it trapped in a spirit world. Other game appearances include Pokkén Tournament, Pokémon Unite, New Pokémon Snap, and Pokémon GO.

In media related to the franchise, Gardevoir also appears in Pokémon anime series. Particularly, a Gardevoir is used by the Trainer Diantha, who transforms it into Mega Gardevoir to beat both series protagonist Ash Ketchum and recurring character Lance during a major tournament in the series. In these appearances, Gardevoir is voiced by Kei Shindō in Japanese, and Michele Knotz in English. Gardevoir also appeared in an episode of the original net animation series Pokétoon titled "Tomorrow with Gardevoir Too", and was voiced by Kana Hanazawa.

In physical media, Gardevoir and Mega Gardevoir have both appeared in the Pokémon Trading Card Game, as and several figures of the character have also been produced by companies such as Bandai and Re-Ment. In 2025, The Pokémon Company released a posable life-sized Gardevoir plush.

== Critical reception ==
Since its introduction Gardevoir has been well received, placing 9th on The Pokémon Company's 2020 "Pokémon of the Year" poll which featured all Pokémon from throughout the franchise. In 2023, Centennial Media's The Ultimate Guide to Pokémon noted that after compiling monthly search histories of Google, Yahoo, and Microsoft Bing, Gardevoir was the second highest searched Pokémon among internet users with an approximate total of 158,400 average searches per month. The staff of Inside cited Gardevoir alongside the Pokémon Mawile as examples of Pokémon that stood out amongst the Ruby and Sapphire's cast for how cute they were, something they felt took players by surprise especially upon realizing they were not strictly female, but despite this its caring nature coupled with its "beautiful woman" appearance made it highly desired by players. The addition of its Fairy-type as of Pokémon X and Y has also been praised, with Yash Nair of Dot eSports emphasizing how it improved the species competitive viability in the games.

Paste writers Kevin Slackie and Moises Taveras named them one of the best Pokémon in the franchise in their eyes, praising its "beauty and grace" while citing its popularity with players across all of its game appearances. Cian Maher and Ryan Woodrow of USA Today named them both one of the franchise's best Psychic and Fairy type Pokémon, specifically stating that it exudes "the exact kind of mysterious energy that all Fairies should", as well as being "widely revered" as one of the best Pokémon from the Ruby and Sapphire titles. Woodrow repeated these sentiments in an article for Sports Illustrated, stating that Gardevoir has "a simple humanoid body that makes it look graceful, but the design of the head and arms bring in those weird elements that you want from a good Psychic-type". In 2015, Destructoid named Gardevoir the website's "favorite Pocket Monster", with Kyle MacGregor Burleson writing a poem praising the species' design and abilities.

However, some outlets were critical of Gardevoir's design and characteristics. GamesRadar+'s Carolyn Gudmundson noted that humanoid designs were some of the most overused amongst Pokémon in the franchise, but in particular "things go wrong when a Pokémon design goes from 'bipedal version of an animal that's usually a quadruped' to anything that resembles a sexy woman". The staff of Fanbyte also described Gardevoir as one of the more "off putting" designs due to its gendered appearance, comparing it to a princess or ballerina. Graduate School of International Studies Assistant Professor Sukhee Han was also critical of this aspect in their study of gender across the series, feeling that it undermined its equal gender ratio in the games due to being indeterminate at a glance without the need of external information.

Cian Maher in an article for TheGamer both praised and disliked Gardevoir. Though they called it "one of the best Pokémon ever designed", he felt it was hampered by its gameplay design and emphasized while it was still a strong contender in the franchise for players to use, he observed it did not achieve the same level of strength the game commonly afforded similar Pokémon. He however acknowledged that the species was routinely featured by Game Freak throughout the franchise in games and media, lamenting "Gardevoir isn’t short on love from the people who work on Pokémon - it just isn't being used to its full potential."

=== As a sex symbol ===
Fan interpretations often regard Gardevoir as strictly female. Some unlicensed media sexualize its design by adding as breasts and fetish attire, such as Pocket Incoming (pictured) with Mega Gardevoir.

Gardevoir's feminine humanoid design has led the fandom to heavily sexualize the species through fan works and discussions. Third-party companies have also utilized its design in unlicensed erotic games, often incorporating sexualized aspects to the design. This usage has led to some criticism, with Hideaki Fujiwara of Automaton arguing particularly that the character's portrayal in unlicensed mobile game Pocket Incoming served to "tarnish" the image of Pokémon as a franchise. Meanwhile, the high volume of erotic fan content has resulted in multiple media outlets to voice disdain for the trend or outright suggest one avoid looking for images of the species on search engines, with USA Today in particular arguing that such presented a good argument for Game Freak to "stop designing humanoid Pokémon."

Searches for pornography and furry pornography of the species have been prominent on sites such as Pornhub, while a June 2023 study of such content on Rule 34 websites such as e621, Rule 34.xxx, and Sankaku Channel noted a high volume of material compared to characters from other franchises, and the second highest of characters from the Pokémon franchise as a whole. An interviewee for Vice attributed this particular popularity to its more "human" and "pretty" feminine design, something they felt Pokémon introduced in games prior to Ruby and Sapphire lacked. The life-sized plush's release was met with some skepticism in this scope; when it quickly sold out, Chinese fans commented about being unable to "purchase their wife" while others joking suggested making use of a blacklight when acquiring one on the secondary market due to the implications of its usage.

Other outlets noted the fandom's heavy focus on sex appeal towards Gardevoir has led to fans of the species being reluctant to say so to avoid negative connotations. In particular, TheGamer's Editor in Chief Stacey Henley voiced her displeasure, having taken a liking to the species due to seeing her own transgender identity reflected in Gardevoir's evolutionary line. Describing her initial reaction to Gardevoir as "the most beautiful Pokemon I had ever seen", she added that while she understood the sexual appeal of the species for some due to its humanoid shape and "motherly vibe" it had become impossible to discuss the character or try to find art of it online due to significant amount of pornography. She expressed gratitude that the games such as New Pokémon Snap emphasized its "pure [...] caring and nurturing" aspects instead, but still felt that "Gardevoir is one of Pokemon's brightest stars, and it's a shame that they’ve been tarnished like this."

== See also ==
- Pokémon and pornography
