= Anyphaena sceptile =

Scientific classification
- Kingdom: Animalia
- Phylum: Arthropoda
- Subphylum: Chelicerata
- Class: Arachnida
- Order: Araneae
- Infraorder: Araneomorphae
- Family: Anyphaenidae
- Genus: Anyphaena
- Species: A. sceptile

Binomial name
- Anyphaena sceptile Lin & Li, 2021

Species of spider

Anyphaena sceptile is a species of spider in the family Anyphaenidae found in China.

== Etymology ==
The species is named after Sceptile, a fictional character from Pokémon.

== Taxonomy and systematics ==
The male is similar to those of A. grovyle and A. mogan in having a similarly shaped conductor, but it can be distinguished by the long, sword-shaped median apophysis and by the short, robust dorsal branch of the retrolateral tibial apophysis. Females can be easily distinguished by the inconspicuous copulatory openings, located beneath the inner edges of the lateral lobes.

== Description ==
The male holotype has a total length of 5.22 mm. The carapace is 2.52 mm long and 2.02 mm wide, pale yellow. The opisthosoma is 2.61 mm long and 1.81 mm wide, pale yellow. The legs are yellow and covered with many setae. Leg formula is 1432. The palp has a short ventral tibial basal apophysis. The retrolateral tibial apophysis has two parts (wider than long); the dorsal branch is distal to the ventral branch, both robust. The ventral tibial basal apophysis has two apophyses. The sperm duct has two conspicuous spirals. The median apophysis is long, almost triangular, and covers the conductor in ventral view. The conductor is strongly curved. The embolus is filamentous.

The female paratype has a total length of 7.12 mm. The carapace is 2.62 mm long and 2.23 mm wide, pale yellow. The opisthosoma is 4.06 mm long and 2.49 mm wide. Leg formula is 1423. The epigyne is longer than wide. The copulatory openings are inconspicuous, located beneath a chitinized structure. The copulatory ducts are convoluted with an enlarged base. The accessory glands are distinct and located anterolaterally on the spermathecae. The spermathecae are globular.

== Distribution and habitat ==
The species is known only from the type locality: Dongsizhan, Bawangling, Changjiang County, Hainan, China.
