= Pokémon Omega Ruby and Alpha Sapphire =

2014 video games

Pokémon Omega Ruby; Pokémon Alpha Sapphire
- North American box art for Pokémon Omega Ruby and Pokémon Alpha Sapphire, depicting the legendary Pokémon Primal Groudon and Primal Kyogre respectively
- Developer: Game Freak
- Publishers: JP: The Pokémon Company; WW: Nintendo
- Director: Shigeru Ohmori
- Producers: Junichi Masuda; Shusaku Egami; Takato Utsunomiya; Hitoshi Yamagami
- Designers: Masafumi Saito; Kazumasa Iwao; Masafumi Nukita; Suguru Nakatsui
- Programmer: Tomoya Takahashi
- Artists: Mana Ibe; Ken Sugimori
- Writer: Masafumi Nukita
- Composers: Shota Kageyama; Minako Adachi; Hideaki Kuroda; Hitomi Sato
- Series: Pokémon
- Platform: Nintendo 3DS
- Release: WW: 21 November 2014; EU: 28 November 2014
- Genre: Role-playing
- Modes: Single-player, multiplayer

Pokémon Omega Ruby (Note: Japanese: ポケットモンスター オメガルビー, Hepburn: Poketto Monsutā Omega Rubī; "Pocket Monsters: Omega Ruby") and Pokémon Alpha Sapphire (Note: Japanese: ポケットモンスター アルファサファイア, Hepburn: Poketto Monsutā Arufa Safaia; "Pocket Monsters: Alpha Sapphire") are 2014 remakes of the 2002 Game Boy Advance role-playing video games Pokémon Ruby and Sapphire, also including some features from Pokémon Emerald. The games are part of the sixth generation of the Pokémon video game series, developed by Game Freak and published by The Pokémon Company and Nintendo for the Nintendo 3DS. Announced in May 2014, the games were released in Japan, North America and Australia on 21 November 2014, exactly twelve years after the original release date of Ruby and Sapphire, while the European release was the following week.

Omega Ruby and Alpha Sapphire received generally positive reviews from critics. As of 30 September 2024, a combined total of 14.63 million copies have been sold worldwide, ranking them as the fourth-best-selling Nintendo 3DS titles of all time.

== Gameplay ==
Though Pokémon Omega Ruby and Alpha Sapphire are remakes of games from the third generation, they retain changes made in later generations, such as the type split from the fourth generation and unlimited TM usage and triple battles from the fifth generation. They also retain gameplay features introduced in Pokémon X and Y, such as Mega Evolution, Pokémon Amie, Super Training and the Player Search System. The games introduced a unique mechanic for Kyogre and Groudon dubbed "Primal Reversion", akin to the broader Mega Evolution feature. The games also let players ride Latios or Latias to "soar" above Hoenn to travel, with some in-game areas being exclusively accessible through this feature.

== Setting and story ==
The setting and story of Omega Ruby and Alpha Sapphire are largely the same as the original Ruby and Sapphire games. It begins with the player character riding in the back of a moving truck, who is relocating to the Hoenn Region from the Johto Region with their mother, as their father Norman has been hired as the Petalburg City Gym Leader. The player arrives with their parents at the family's new home in the village of Littleroot Town, on the southern edge of the main island. The player character begins their Pokémon Trainer journey by saving Professor Birch, the leading professor in the Hoenn Region, from a wild Poochyena, choosing either Treecko, Torchic, or Mudkip to defend him. Following the defeat of the wild Pokémon, the player receives the chosen Pokémon as their Starter Pokémon. The player then travels around Hoenn to complete the Pokédex and battle the region's eight Gym Leaders.

Along the way, the player character encounters the antagonist group Team Magma in Omega Ruby or Team Aqua in Alpha Sapphire who wish to use the power of the Legendary Pokémon, Primal Groudon in Omega Ruby, and Primal Kyogre in Alpha Sapphire, to change the world to suit their desires. Team Magma wants to use Groudon to dry up the oceans and expand the landmass, thereby allowing humanity to progress further. Meanwhile, Team Aqua wishes to summon Kyogre to flood the lands and revert the world to a prehistoric state, which will allow Pokémon to live more freely. However, unlike in the original games, depending on the game version, Archie and Maxie will actually use the correct orb, leading to their Primal Reversions. With the help of Hoenn League Champion Steven Stone, and the Gym Leader Wallace, the player defeats their respective team and then either captures or defeats the Legendary Pokémon to prevent a global drought / heavy rainfall and thus ensuring the teams' mutual reformation. The player then advances on to the Hoenn League, challenging the Elite Four and then the Hoenn League Champion, Steven, to become the new Hoenn League Champion. The player also has the option of participating in the various Pokémon Contests throughout Hoenn, using their Pokémon to put on a performance for an audience and judges. Aside from the gameplay, 20 new Mega Evolutions were added including 1 for the starter you pick, since Pokémon X and Y, as well as "primal reversions" for Groudon and Kyogre, which function similarly.

A new side quest is featured in Omega Ruby and Alpha Sapphire, called the "Delta Episode". The player must work with the new character, Zinnia, as well as Steven and Professor Cozmo, to find a way to stop a meteor from crashing into the planet. This also requires capturing the Legendary Pokémon Rayquaza in order to stop the meteor that holds the Mythical Pokémon Deoxys.

== Release ==
Pokémon Omega Ruby and Alpha Sapphire were released in Japan, North America and Australia on 21 November 2014, exactly twelve years after the original release date of Ruby and Sapphire, while the European release was the following week. They are the third remake pairs in the franchise following Pokémon FireRed and LeafGreen for the Game Boy Advance in 2004 and Pokémon HeartGold and SoulSilver for the Nintendo DS in 2009. As with Pokémon X and Y, the games include all official translations, unlike previous generations where games contained only certain languages depending on the region or country they were originally distributed.

== Reception ==
Reception

Aggregate scores
Aggregator	Score
Metacritic	83/100 (Omega Ruby); 82/100 (Alpha Sapphire)
OpenCritic	89% recommend

Review scores
Publication	Score
Famitsu	9/10, 10/10, 9/10, 9/10
Game Informer	8.75/10
GameSpot	8/10
IGN	7.8/10 (Alpha Sapphire)
Joystiq	4.5/5
Nintendo World Report	9/10
Polygon	8/10
Hardcore Gamer	4/5

Pokémon Omega Ruby and Alpha Sapphire received generally positive reviews from critics. Review aggregator OpenCritic assessed that the games received strong approval, being recommended by 89% of critics. GameSpot's Peter Brown praised the 3D visuals and the super training mechanic, but believed the game failed to fully resolve general issues in the game formula. IGN's Kallie Plagge also praised the game's 3D reinvention of Hoenn and online functionality. Plagge was, however, critical of the over-abundance of HMs needed to play the game as well as the perceived imbalance favoring Water-type Pokémon and the reliance on water-based routes. She remarked that while the Dive feature was novel in the original release, it had since become tedious.

At the 2014 Game Awards it was nominated for Best Remaster, but lost out to Grand Theft Auto V.

=== Sales ===
The games sold 3,040,000 copies in their first three days of sale. Of the total sales, 1,534,593 copies were sold in Japan, the rest were sold in North America and Australia. Omega Ruby and Alpha Sapphire had the biggest launch in the series history in the United Kingdom, beating the previous record held by Pokémon Black and White. By the end of 2014, the games had sold 2.4 million copies in Japan. As of 31 March 2023, a combined total of 14.57 million copies have been sold worldwide, ranking them as the fourth-best-selling Nintendo 3DS titles of all time.
