= Shedinja =

Pokémon species

- Pokémon character
- Shedinja artwork by Ken Sugimori
- First appearance: Pokémon Ruby and Sapphire (2002)
- Designed by: Ken Sugimori (finalized)

In-universe information
- Species: Pokémon
- Type: Bug and Ghost

Shedinja (/ʃɛdˈɪndʒə/), known in Japan as Nukenin (Japanese: ヌケニン), is a Pokémon species in Nintendo and Game Freak's Pokémon media franchise, and an evolved form of the Pokémon Nincada. First introduced in the 2002 video games Pokémon Ruby and Sapphire, it is a Bug and Ghost-type Pokémon that comes into existence upon Nincada evolving into another Pokémon Ninjask when its owner does not have a full team. It has exactly 1 HP and an ability called Wonder Guard, ensuring that only "super effective" types hurt it, but any damage it takes knocks it out.

Shedinja was absent from the games Pokémon Scarlet and Violet, speculated to be because an Electric Tera type Shedinja can be given an Air Balloon, making it run out of super effective types and therefore making it almost invincible. It also appears in other games in the series, such as Pokémon Go and the Pokémon Trading Card Game. Its evolution method and its design, inspired by the husk of a cicada, are considered a highlight of Shedinja's, identified as a particularly strange Pokémon by multiple critics. Its ability, Wonder Guard, was also commented on, with two entomologists stating that Shedinja demonstrated the theme of rebirth with respect to cicadas found in other cultures.

== Concept and creation ==
Shedinja is a species of fictional creatures called Pokémon created for the Pokémon media franchise. Developed by Game Freak and published by Nintendo, the Japanese franchise began in 1996 with the video games Pokémon Red and Green for the Game Boy, which were later released in North America as Pokémon Red and Blue in 1998. In these games and their sequels, the player assumes the role of a Trainer whose goal is to capture and use the creatures' special abilities to combat other Pokémon. Some Pokémon can transform into stronger species through evolution via various means, such as exposure to specific items. Each Pokémon has one or two elemental types, which define its advantages and disadvantages when battling other Pokémon. A major goal in each game is to complete the Pokédex, a comprehensive Pokémon encyclopedia, by capturing, evolving, and trading with other Trainers to obtain individuals from all Pokémon species.

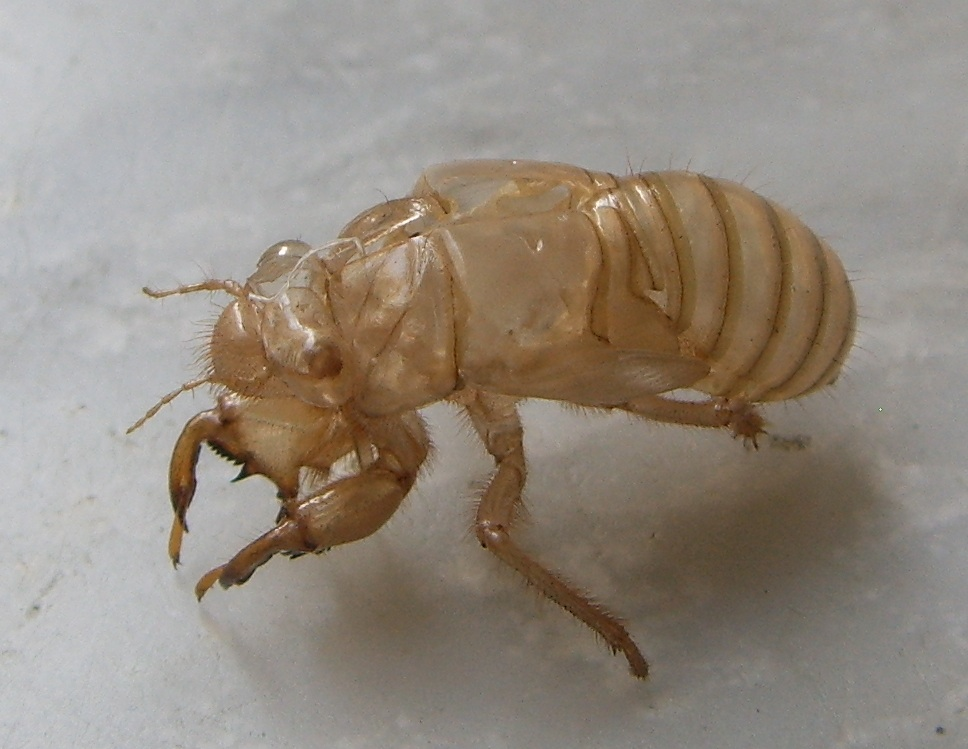
Shedinja is based on a cicada's husk, the leftover hollow shell of the cicada when it sheds

Shedinja is a Bug and Ghost-type Pokémon, the only Pokémon to have this type, originally introduced in Pokémon Ruby and Sapphire. When designing these games, Game Freak initially wanted to not include any of the Pokémon from the previous games, with lead artist Ken Sugimori using this as an opportunity to push the concept of what a Pokémon could look like. To this end, wanted to emphasize "cooler" ones, due to feedback the team had received that Pokémon was seen as too "babyish". Additionally, while the previous Pokémon Gold and Silver species were bound to simplistic designs for the sake of the related anime and toy manufacturing, Sugimori stated in an interview he said "screw it" and focused on more complex and fleshed out designs with these games. As the art team developed the Pokémon species, Sugimori would finalize their work and draw the promotional art, altering details as he felt necessary. It has no gender. Its name is a portmanteau of "shed" and "ninja." In Japanese, its name, Nukenin, is a word meaning a ninja without a master or clan. Specifically, "nukegara" translates as "husk", while "nukekawaru" translates as "to shed".

When the Pokémon Nincada evolves into Ninjask while its owner has fewer than six Pokémon in their party, Shedinja will appear in one of the empty spots. Shedinja has the lowest combined base stats of any fully-evolved Pokémon, lower than Ninjask's, having only one HP. Its ability, Wonder Guard, makes it immune to all damage that is not super effective against it. Being Bug and Ghost, Shedinja is only susceptible to Fire, Flying, Rock, Ghost, and Dark attacks. Additionally, Shedinja may be knocked out by certain other types of damage, including weather effects and status conditions. Shedinja is a brown and grey Pokémon, a husk left behind after Nincada evolves into Ninjask. It has a hole between its wings, revealing that it is hollow inside without any internal organs. It is based on the husk left behind by cicada, the basis for Nincada's design, when they molt.

== Appearances ==
Shedinja first appeared in Pokémon Ruby and Sapphire, obtained by evolving Nincada into Ninjask while not having a full party of six Pokémon. It is obtained in most future games through this method, and can also be obtained via in-game raid battles in Pokémon Sword and Shield. In Pokémon Scarlet and Violet, Shedinja, alongside Nincada and Ninjask, are unavailable. In Pokémon Go, despite Pokémon from the fourth generation of the series being added, Shedinja was one of a remaining few Pokémon from the third generation still not available. It was later revealed to appear by developer Niantic, Inc., who revealed it before either Nincada or Ninjask. When the Trainer Battle feature was added to Pokémon Go, Shedinja was one of two Pokémon banned for use, alongside Ditto. Unlike the main Pokémon games, evolving Nincada does not create a Ninjask, and it must be obtained via the field research feature. Shedinja is featured in the Pokémon Trading Card Game, first introduced in the "EX Dragon" set of cards. In this set, its Wonder Guard ability differs, making it immune to attacks from evolved Pokémon and EX Pokémon. It has since been featured as part of future sets with new cards. Shedinja appears as a Spirit in Super Smash Bros. Ultimate, a type of collectible that can be used to power-up the user. In the game's story mode, the character Mr. Game & Watch has Shedinja's "spirit."

Shedinja appeared in a two-parter pair of episodes of the Pokémon anime, used by an opposing antagonist to steal Misty's Togepi. It was eventually defeated by Misty's Gyarados.

== Reception ==
Noted as a particularly strange and unique Pokémon by multiple critics, with Kotaku writer Kenneth Shepard stating that the lore behind it was one of the first times the series' "scary Ghost lore" resonated with him, finding the concept behind it only being able to battle "horrifying." A writer for IGN found its Wonder Guard ability to be a cool one, stating that it was useful against teams with little diversity in their attacks. She found herself unable to use it in her own game, calling it "gross" and stating that she had better experiences with Pokémon species she could "respect on a personal level". Entomologists R A Schmidt-Jeffris and J C Nelson discussed how cicadas represented rebirth in many cultures and how Shedinja demonstrates that through its evolutionary process. They believed that Shedinja's Wonder Guard ability and low HP created a sense of both fragility and strength, associating it with the Pokémon's "association with death and rebirth."

Nintendo Life writer Tim Rattray felt that one of the best qualities of the early Pokémon fandom was the "schoolyard tall tales" that spread pre-Internet, stating that he eventually became skeptical enough that he doubted people who spoke of the existence of Shedinja. He compared the method of obtaining it to rumors of the Pokémon Mew being found under a truck in Pokémon Red and Blue, believing it was too outlandish to be true. He felt that Shedinja was less interesting than the intrigue surrounding it, thus becoming forgotten, stating how disappointed he was that it was so forgettable despite being a unique type combination and cool concept. Prima Games writer Jesse Vitelli felt that Shedinja represented what he loved the most about the series, namely the "weird evolutions" and secrets. He called it "incredibly strange" and wished that there would be more weird Pokémon like it. USA Today writer Cian Maher found its Wonder Guard ability and "angelic" aesthetic compelling, though feeling that the most intriguing element was the evolution method. He felt that it was among the best and strangest design concepts in the series.

Due to Shedinja's absence in Scarlet and Violet, speculation arose as to why it was not added, with Dot Esports writer Karli Iwamasa stating that it may have been left out due to Terastallization, a game mechanic that could make it nearly invulnerable. This sentiment shared by Game Rant writer Katelyn Mitchell Jewett, who noted that players have historically sought out ways to mitigate its weaknesses. Inside Games writer Yuzu and Takumin tested out Shedinja's Wonder Guard ability in Pokémon Go, expressing disappointment over being unable to use Shedinja in combat either offensively or defensively, hoping that it would have been more faithful to how it worked normally. Bleeding Cool writer Theo Dwyer was also disappointed with Shedinja's role in Pokémon Go, stating that they could have done more to implement the evolution method from the mainline games into it.

== See also ==
- Cicadas in mythology
