= Anyphaena grovyle =

Scientific classification
- Kingdom: Animalia
- Phylum: Arthropoda
- Subphylum: Chelicerata
- Class: Arachnida
- Order: Araneae
- Infraorder: Araneomorphae
- Family: Anyphaenidae
- Genus: Anyphaena
- Species: A. grovyle

Binomial name
- Anyphaena grovyle Lin & Li, 2021

Species of spider

Anyphaena grovyle is a species of ghost spider found in China.

== Etymology ==
The species is named after Grovyle, a fictional character from Pokémon.

== Taxonomy and systematics ==
Males of A. grovyle are similar to those of A. mogan in having a similarly shaped median apophysis, conductor, and retrolateral tibial apophysis, but they can be distinguished by the jagged terminus of the median apophysis, the conductor reaching the top of the median apophysis, and the length ratio of the dorsal branch of the retrolateral tibial apophysis to the ventral branch being almost 1:2.

Females of A. grovyle are similar to A. mogan in having globular spermathecae and convoluted copulatory ducts with an enlarged base, but they have laterally directed copulatory openings with an epigynal tooth above, and the sclerotized epigynal plate has an atrium with laterally placed copulatory openings.

== Description ==
The male holotype has a total length of 5.12 mm. The carapace is 2.02 mm long and 1.41 mm wide, pale yellow. The opisthosoma is 3.62 mm long and 1.52 mm wide, pale yellow. The legs are yellow and covered with many setae. Leg formula is 1432. The palp has a short ventral tibial basal apophysis. The retrolateral tibial apophysis has two parts, longer than wide; the dorsal branch of retrolateral tibial apophysis is long and needle-shaped, twice as long as the ventral branch of retrolateral tibial apophysis. The ventral branch of retrolateral tibial apophysis is triangular. The sperm duct has two conspicuous spirals. The median apophysis is irregular polygon-shaped with a flat, serrated terminus. The conductor is strongly curved, and its tip reaches the median apophysis. The embolus is filamentous.

The female paratype has a total length of 6.72 mm. The carapace is 2.20 mm long and 1.81 mm wide, pale yellow. The opisthosoma is 4.02 mm long and 2.52 mm wide. Leg formula is 1423. The epigyne is wider than long. The copulatory openings are inconspicuous, with an epigynal tooth above. The copulatory ducts are convoluted with an enlarged base. The accessory glands are distinct and located anterolaterally of the spermathecae. the spermathecae are globular.

== Distribution and habitat ==
The species is known only from the type locality: Wuzhi Mountain, Wuzhishan City, Hainan, China.
