= Pokémon X and Y =

2013 video games

Pokémon X; Pokémon Y
- North American box art for Pokémon X and Pokémon Y, depicting the legendary Pokémon Xerneas and Yveltal respectively
- Developer: Game Freak
- Publishers: JP: The Pokémon Company; WW: Nintendo
- Director: Junichi Masuda
- Producers: Hitoshi Yamagami; Shusaku Egami; Takato Utsunomiya; Junichi Masuda
- Designer: Shigeru Ohmori
- Programmer: Katsumi Ono
- Artist: Ken Sugimori
- Writer: Toshinobu Matsumiya
- Composers: Shota Kageyama; Minako Adachi; Hitomi Sato; Junichi Masuda
- Series: Pokémon
- Platform: Nintendo 3DS
- Release: WW: 12 October 2013
- Genre: Role-playing
- Modes: Single-player, multiplayer

Pokémon X and Pokémon Y are 2013 role-playing video games developed by Game Freak and published by The Pokémon Company and Nintendo for the Nintendo 3DS. They are the first installments in the sixth generation of the main Pokémon game series. First announced in January 2013 by Nintendo president Satoru Iwata through a Nintendo Direct, Pokémon X and Pokémon Y were released worldwide in October 2013, and they were the first Pokémon games to have a simultaneous global release.

As with previous installments, the games follow the journey of a young Pokémon Trainer as they train and battle Pokémon while thwarting schemes of the criminal organisation Team Flare. X and Y introduced 72 new Pokémon species, and added new features including the new Fairy-type, character customisation, updated battle and training mechanics such as "Mega Evolution", and completely rendered polygonal 3D graphics as opposed to the sprites used in previous generations. While the games are independent of each other and each can be played separately, trading Pokémon between the two games is necessary to complete the games' Pokédex.

X and Y received generally positive reviews; critics praised the games' visuals and transition to 3D models, though the games' story, characters and linearity drew criticism. The highly anticipated games were a commercial success, selling four million copies worldwide in the first weekend, beating their predecessors Pokémon Black and White's record and making them the fastest-selling games on the 3DS. As of 30 September 2024, a combined total of 16.76 million copies have been sold worldwide, making X and Y the second best-selling games on the system after Mario Kart 7.

A sequel, Pokémon Legends: Z-A, features the redevelopment of Lumiose City (the largest city in Kalos, inspired by Paris, France) and was released for the Nintendo Switch and Nintendo Switch 2 on October 16, 2025. It takes place five years after the events of Pokémon X and Y.

== Gameplay ==
Pokémon X and Y are role-playing video games with adventure elements, presented in a third-person, overhead perspective. They are also the first Pokémon games to include 3D functions compatible with the consoles in the Nintendo 3DS family. The player controls a young Pokémon Trainer who goes on a quest to catch and train creatures known as Pokémon and win battles against other Trainers. By defeating opposing Pokémon in turn-based battles, the player's Pokémon gain experience, allowing them to level up and increase their battle statistics, learn new moves, and in some cases, evolve into more powerful Pokémon. Alternatively, players can capture wild Pokémon found during random encounters by weakening them in battle and catching them with Poké Balls to be added to the player's party. Players are also able to battle and trade Pokémon with other human players using the Nintendo 3DS's internet features, which were enhanced in the sixth generation games. Like with previous games in the series, certain Pokémon are only obtainable in either X or Y, keeping players encouraged to trade with others in order to obtain all Pokémon.

=== New features ===
Pokémon X and Y are the first titles in the main series presented in fully 3D polygonal graphics, allowing for more interactivity with the overworld and more dynamic action during battles. Players are also able to customise their Pokémon trainer's appearance, choosing gender, skin tone and hair colour at the start of the game, and can later acquire outfits and accessories in-game to change their character's look. Joining the previous generations of Pokémon are all new species, such as the new Starter Pokémon; Chespin, Fennekin and Froakie, and the Legendary Pokémon Xerneas, Yveltal and Zygarde. The player can choose from one of the classic starter Pokémon from Pokémon Red and Blue later on in the game. The new Fairy-type is introduced for both new and old Pokémon, and it is the first new type added to the series since Pokémon Gold and Silver. The game's developers stated the addition was used to balance the Dragon-type.

A new element in the series is Mega Evolution, in which fully evolved Pokémon, such as Mewtwo and Lucario, can use special items called "Mega Stones" to temporarily evolve further into Mega Evolved forms during battle, with some Pokémon having multiple possible Mega form available. Also introduced are Sky Battles, and Horde Encounters. The former are mid-air trainer battles that only airborne Pokémon can participate in; these were added to take advantage of the game's 3D-capabilities and provide a new perspective to battling. The latter being one-versus-five wild encounters designed to be more difficult than standard one-versus-one wild battles. The Pokémon-Amie mode allowed the player to interact with their Pokémon using the 3DS' touchscreen and camera, playing with them and giving them treats to strengthen their bonds between trainer and Pokémon, and ultimately influencing how Pokémon would act during battle. Super Training features various minigames that help build the base stats of the player's Pokémon, which in turn unlocks training bags that can help Pokémon to become stronger.

=== Connectivity to other devices ===
Along with the many additions that X and Y introduced, various improvements to the communication features were also implemented. Using the Player Search System (PSS), players can encounter and keep track of various online players, including strangers, allowing them to easily initiate battles or trades. The Holo Caster allows the player to receive messages and updates from NPCs via StreetPass and SpotPass. Wonder Trade is a new trading feature which allows players to trade one of their Pokémon in exchange for a random one from another player. Other features include O-Powers, temporary powers that can increase stats and can be exchanged with other players, and improvements to the Global Trade System, allowing players to request Pokémon they have not encountered. At certain points in the game, players will be able to take in-game screenshots, which they can then share on the Pokémon Global Link website.

Pokémon Bank is an optional paid cloud storage service that allows players to store up to 3,000 Pokémon online to be shared amongst whichever physical or downloaded copies of the games they own. Another application called Poké Transporter allows players to upload Pokémon owned in Pokémon Black, White, Black 2, and White 2 to Bank, which can then be imported into X and Y. These applications, announced for release on 27 December 2013, were postponed to 5 February 2014, due to the volume of traffic on the Nintendo Network service. Pokémon Bank will be shutting down on 26 February 2027, almost four years after the closure of the Nintendo eShop on the WiiU and 3DS.

== Plot ==
=== Setting ===
X and Y take place in the Kalos Region. The player begins their adventure in Vaniville Town, located in the lower right point of the star-shaped region. The large, circular city just north of center is Lumiose City.

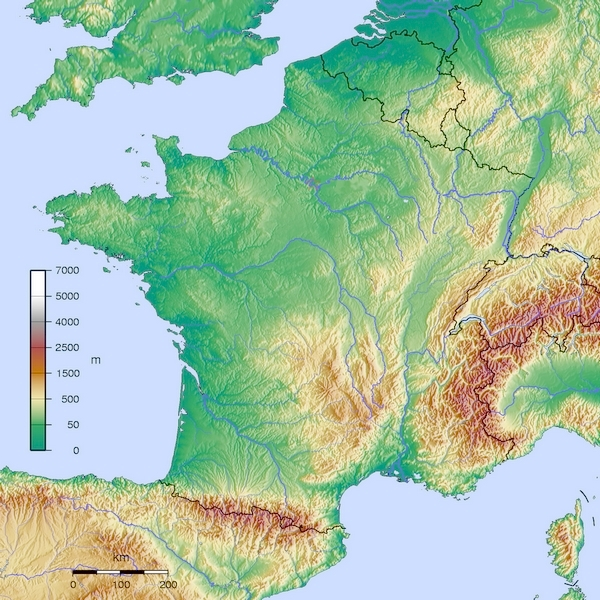
Topographic image of France, which heavily inspired the design of the Kalos Region

The games take place in the star-shaped Kalos Region, (Note: Kalos Region (カロス地方, Karosu-chihō)) one of many such regions across the fictional Pokémon world. Centered around beauty, the region is heavily inspired by Metropolitan France and, to a lesser extent, Europe as a whole. Many locations and landmarks across Kalos have real-world inspirations, including Prism Tower (Eiffel Tower), the Lumiose Art Museum (the Louvre) and the stones outside Geosenge Town (Carnac stones). Wild Pokémon inhabit every corner of the Kalos region, many of which are only known to appear in this area.

=== Story ===
Similar to previous Pokémon games, X and Y both follow a linear storyline whose main events occur in a fixed order. The protagonist of Pokémon X and Y has just moved to a small town called Vaniville Town with their mother Grace. They soon befriend four trainers—Shauna, Tierno, Trevor and their rival Calem or Serena, (Note: Calem and Serena are the standard names given to the male and female player characters, respectively. The character chosen by the player may be freely named. The character not chosen by the player appears in-game as a rival.)—all of whom were called to meet Professor Augustine Sycamore who is the leading professor in the Kalos Region in Lumiose City, the main city of Kalos. Receiving either Chespin, Fennekin or Froakie as their Starter Pokémon from Tierno, the player begins their adventure. Along the way, they learn of Pokémon Gyms and receive their first badge for defeating Viola, the Santalune City Gym Leader. Thereafter, they encounter Sina and Dexio, assistants of Sycamore, who brings them to the professor himself; however, once in Lumiose City they discover the area to be suffering from a partial power outage. Upon meeting Sycamore in Lumiose City, the player is informed of Mega Evolution and he requests they travel across Kalos and uncover the mysteries behind it. He provides them with one of the Kanto Region starter Pokémon and their respective Mega Stone. Before leaving Lumiose City, the player encounters an imposing man named Lysandre who desires a more beautiful world.

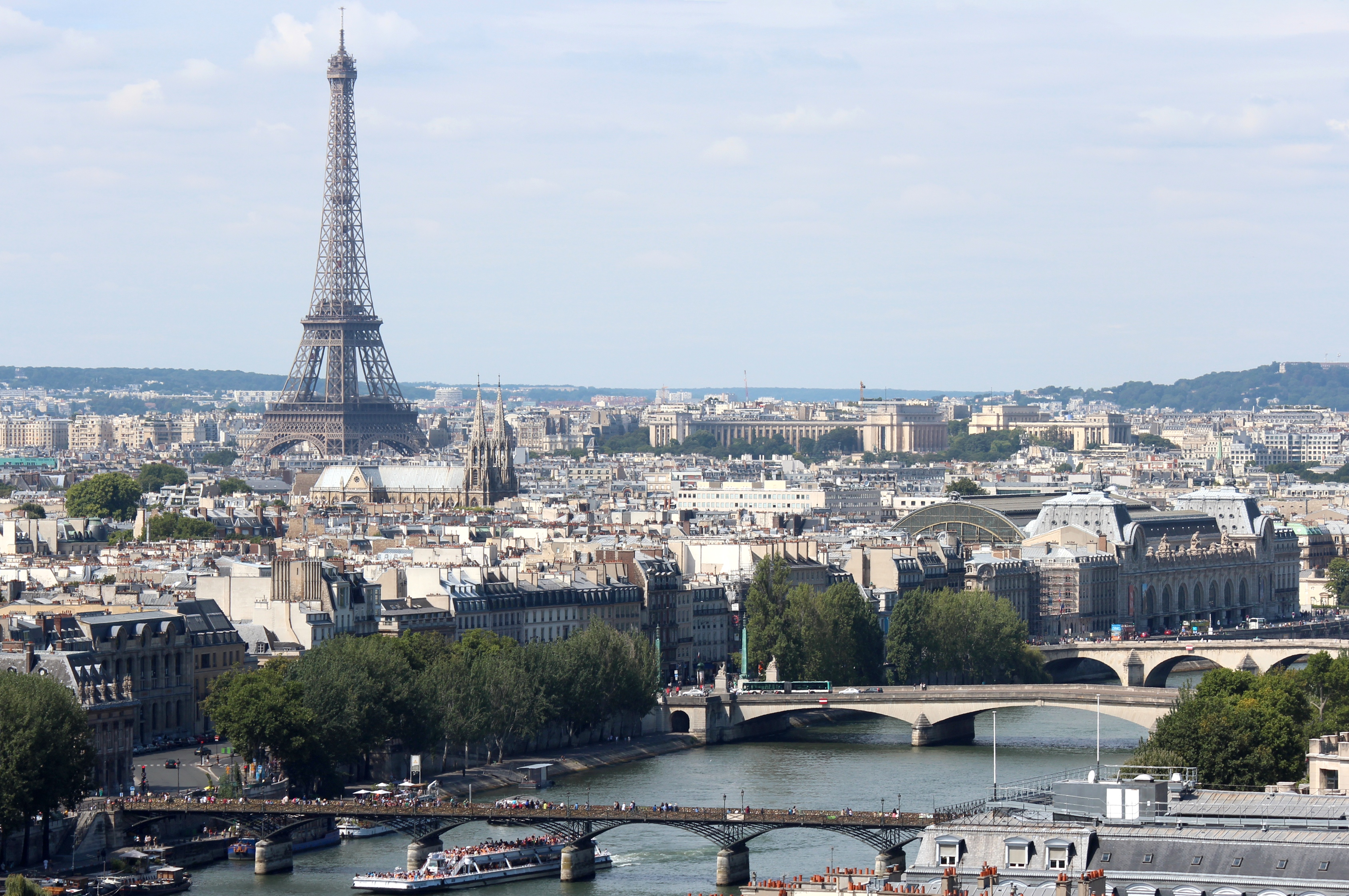
The Kalos Region was heavily inspired by France, with the main city—Lumiose City—being a representation of Paris (pictured). The in-game city is crowned by the Prism Tower, a building inspired by the Eiffel Tower.

Continuing their journey, the player encounters the villainous Team Flare, whose goals at first seem to be geared towards making money off of Pokémon. Later encounters with Team Flare reveal their true goal to be the annihilation of humanity to return the world to a pristine, more beautiful state. In Shalour City, the player learns how to use Mega Evolution from the Mega Evolution guru Gurkinn and his granddaughter Korrina, who is the Shalour City Gym Leader. Defeating Korrina in a special Mega Evolution battle using Lucario, the player is given the ability to freely use Mega Evolution. The player then continues their journey, defeating Gym Leaders and stopping various schemes carried out by Team Flare. In the Lumiose Badlands, the player defeats Team Flare during their attempt to steal energy from the region's power plant and restores power to all of Lumiose City. Once the player obtains their seventh Gym Badge, they, and the rest of Kalos, are addressed by Lysandre through the Holo Caster (a holographic communication device); Lysandre informs them of the fact that he is the Team Flare boss and intends to destroy humanity.

Following hints from friends and locals, the player discovers Team Flare's secret lab under a café in Lumiose City where they formally meet a 9-foot (2.7 m) tall man named AZ; he is revealed to be the 3,000-year-old king who once used the "ultimate weapon"—the same device and weapon of mass destruction Lysandre plans to use—which utilized energy from the Legendary Pokémon Xerneas or Yveltal (Note: The Legendary Pokémon used in the story and which later appears in front of the player is dependent upon the game. Xerneas appears in X while Yveltal appears in Y.) to end a war in Kalos. AZ's decision to use the ultimate weapon was motivated by his desire to revive the Pokémon he loved the most, a variant of the Pokémon Floette, although the Pokémon was disgusted with his choice to use the ultimate weapon and left him. This war 3,000 years ago set in motion the events necessary to create Mega Evolution by inadvertently infusing excessive energy into an asteroid. Alongside Shauna and Calem or Serena, the player sets out to stop Team Flare and Lysandre at their second base in Geosenge Town, the location of the ultimate weapon. Upon reaching the core of the weapon, the player discovers a dormant Xerneas or Yveltal which suddenly awakens with their appearance. They capture the legendary Pokémon and proceed to bring an end to Lysandre's plans after defeating him in battle one final time. After the battle, Lysandre will use the ultimate weapon to destroy the ultimate weapon. The player, Shauna, and Calem or Serena, make their escape from the base before this can happen.

With the defeat of Team Flare, the player resumes their journey and obtains their eighth and final Gym Badge, enabling them to challenge the Elite Four—the most powerful Pokémon Trainers in Kalos. They traverse Victory Road and reach the Kalos League to begin their final challenge. Once they overcome the Elite Four, the player faces and defeats the Kalos League Champion Diantha, making the player the new Kalos League Champion. A parade is organised by Professor Sycamore to celebrate the player's role in saving the Kalos Region and becoming the new Kalos League Champion. AZ battles the player during the parade, recognising the player's true strength and what it means to be a Pokémon Trainer. His Floette then returns to him and they are reunited for the first time in 3,000 years.

== Development ==
Development of Pokémon X and Y began in 2010. Director Junichi Masuda revealed the three main themes of X and Y to be beauty, bonds, and evolution. Beauty was the core focus and Masuda considered France to be a prime example of such; he sent a team to the country for study in 2011. Flowers were integrated into many routes across the game for visual aesthetics, something not done in previous iterations of Pokémon, and for unique wild Pokémon encounters. With the games taking place in a region based on France, design inspiration stemmed more from European culture. The legendary trio of Xerneas, Yveltal and Zygarde have their roots in Norse mythology, for example. More focus than usual was placed on giving new Pokémon unique elements for this generation. The titles X and Y, representing the x-axis and y-axis—also reflecting different forms of thinking—were chosen early in development. The simplicity of the names was also related to the simultaneous worldwide release of the games. Additionally, designers sought to make the Pokémon names the same in every country whenever possible. Masuda expressed that this effort proved exceptionally difficult as the names have to feel fitting to their physical appearance and not infringe upon any rights.

A major design change for the franchise was the shift from two-dimensional sprites to three-dimensional polygons. This required a larger development team than previous games, with more than 500 people involved with the games' development, inclusive of localization teams. Emphasis was placed on retaining the iconic style of Pokémon art director Ken Sugimori who has been designing Pokémon and creating the franchise's official artwork since Red and Green in 1996. At the request of Masuda, the shapes "X" and "Y" were used as the framework for the boxart legendary Pokémon, Xerneas and Yveltal. Normally, Sugimori designs the legendary Pokémon by himself; however, he required assistance from designer Yusuke Ohmura to create Xerneas and Yveltal. Finalization of their designs took about 18 months, 3 times longer than normal. Manga artist Hitoshi Ariga was requested to assist in creating Pokémon for X and Y; Ariga ultimately designed ten species for the games.

=== Music ===
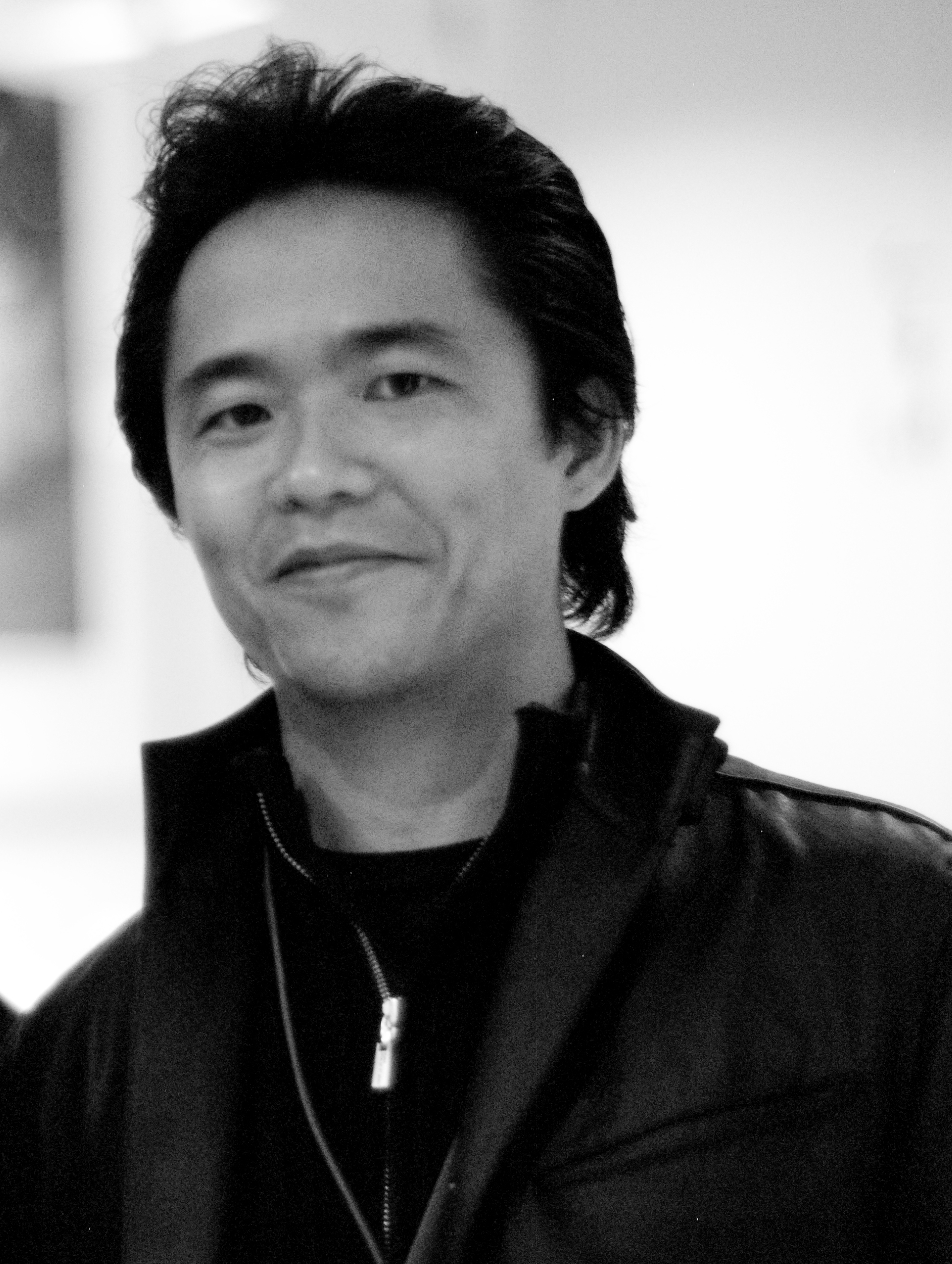
Junichi Masuda (pictured) returned as a composer for the battle themes of X and Y while also serving as the games' director.

The game's score was composed by Shota Kageyama, Minako Adachi, Hitomi Sato, Junichi Masuda, Go Ichinose, and Morikazu Aoki. This was the first usage of the Nintendo 3DS's sound capabilities for the Pokémon series, and Masuda expressed delight over improved sound quality and expression. Similar to the theme of X and Y themselves, the soundtrack of the games were designed to emphasize beauty. Kageyama sought inspiration from the music of France as well; however, he indicated hesitation in making the music sound too French. During an interview with Famitsu magazine, Masuda stated that the Japanese harp was used in place of an accordion in certain situations to avoid sounding excessively French. Additionally, Kageyama cited Masuda himself as inspiration for his work. Although working primarily as the director for X and Y, Masuda composed the games' battle themes. In discussing Battle! (Gym Leader), Masuda stated he wanted to try a new approach and added techno themes.

The official soundtrack consisting of 212 songs, titled Nintendo 3DS Pokémon X-Y Super Music Collection (Note: Japanese: ニンテンドー3DS ポケモン エックス・ワイ スーパーミュージックコレクション, Hepburn: Nintendō Surī Dī Esu Pokemon Ekkusu Wai Sūpā Myūjikku Korekushon), was released on 13 November 2013. The album debuted at number 12 on "Top Albums Chart" and number 3 on the "Independent Albums Chart" of Billboard-Japan. The soundtrack was released digitally worldwide on November 20 through iTunes as Pokémon X & Pokémon Y: Super Music Collection. The soundtrack debuted at 104 on the Billboard 200, and peaked at number 5 on the Billboard soundtracks chart. James Stephanie Sterling of Destructoid praised the music as "utterly lovely", noting "the quieter tunes are legitimately beautiful".

== Release ==
Pokémon X and Y were announced by Satoru Iwata through a Nintendo Direct on 8 January 2013. A first for the main series of Pokémon titles, X and Y were released worldwide on 12 October 2013. Following widespread selling of the titles prior to their release date in the UK and a few places online, Nintendo warned game retailers that they would be penalized if they continued to break street date. A store in Bournemouth, United Kingdom, reportedly started selling the games on October 11. This initiated a domino effect and several other United Kingdom retailers began selling the game early.

A special Nintendo 3DS XL depicting Xerneas and Yveltal in their Shiny forms was released in North America and Europe on 27 September 2013, and in Japan on 12 October 2013. Japan also received a premium gold version depicting Xerneas on the front, and Yveltal and the three starters on the back with either X or Y pre-installed. On 2 October 2013, The X Factor series 9 semifinalists Union J revealed via their social media outlets that they would be involved in the British release of X and Y. For a limited time starting from the game's release on 12 October 2013, until 15 January 2014, players could download a special Torchic, possessing its hidden ability "Speed Boost" and a Blazikenite that allows players to utilize the new Mega Evolution game mechanic to evolve Blaziken to Mega Blaziken. Between 1–31 March 2014, North American Club Nintendo members could get a free download code for Pokémon X or Y as long as they registered a Nintendo 2DS, 3DS or 3DS XL and one of six qualifying games. However, any products registered before this time were said to be ineligible.

In promoting the game's new Mega Evolution feature, Mega Mewtwo Y (then known as "Awakened Mewtwo") was featured in a special episode of the anime titled "Mewtwo: Prologue to Awakening" and then the film ExtremeSpeed Genesect: Mewtwo Awakens, released in Japan on 13 July 2013. Mega Evolution was also featured in the TV special Pokémon Origins, which was a re-telling of the original Pokémon Red and Blue games, and included a surprise appearance of Mega Charizard X. The upcoming season of the Pokémon anime series based on these games, titled Pokémon the Series: XY, began airing in Japan on 17 October 2013, and was previewed in North America and Europe on 19 October 2013.

== Reception ==
Reception

Aggregate scores
Aggregator	Score
GameRankings	87% (X); 88% (Y)
Metacritic	87/100 (X); 88/100 (Y)
OpenCritic	84% recommend

Review scores
Publication	Score
Edge	8/10
Eurogamer	9/10
Famitsu	10/10, 10/10, 10/10, 9/10
Game Informer	8.75/10
GameSpot	8.5/10
IGN	9/10
Joystiq	4.5/5
Nintendo World Report	8/10
Official Nintendo Magazine	93/100
Polygon	9.5/10

=== Critical reception ===
Pokémon X and Y were released to positive reception, garnering "generally favorable reviews" according to review aggregator Metacritic. The positive reception allowed X and Y to claim the 15th and 13th highest-rated games on the Nintendo 3DS, respectively. Fellow review aggregator OpenCritic assessed that the games received "mighty" approval, being recommended by 84% of critics. Three of the four reviewers for the Japanese magazine Weekly Famitsu awarded the game a 10/10 score, earning it the publication's Platinum Award. This made them the second-highest rated Pokémon titles by the magazine, behind only the perfect score awarded to Pokémon Black and White. Two of the reviewers found the new graphics and 3D display made the game feel fresh and fun, as well as praising the newer gameplay mechanics such as mega evolutions and super training.

The games received universal praise for the transition to 3D graphics, the enhanced visuals, and integration of online play. Edge magazine reviewers described the visuals as "rich in detail and flavour, from the stately majesty of the affluent areas to a dilapidated, overgrown hotel whose only guests are squatting punks". Simon Parkin of Eurogamer similarly complimented the game's "smooth and natural" transition to 3D, declaring that "Pokémon X & Y is the finest expression of Satoshi Tajiri's obsessive vision yet." Matt Kamen of The Observer praised the new gameplay mechanics and the graphical and audio improvements, and deemed the games to be "the series' zenith".

IGN reviewer Jose Otero found that the game was "a successful transition to a 3D world", calling it "an even more social, beautiful, and strategic game" compared to its predecessors, adding that many of the new Pokémon's 3D models and animations complemented their individual species' personalities, and that the new Mega Evolutions were "similarly impressive". He also praised the faster pace of the early game, with X and Y providing a wide range of Pokémon to catch within the first hour of gameplay. While Game Informer reviewer Kyle Hilliard found the title's gameplay additions to be mostly positive, "[making] everything more inviting, attractive, and fun", the magazine also felt that they ultimately did not "break the mold" of what players expected from the franchise. Ernest Cavalli at Joystiq and Griffin McElroy at Polygon both praised the gameplay, with Cavalli calling it "hands-down the best in the series", and that the game could be enjoyed equally by both veterans and newcomers to the franchise. Daan Koopman from Nintendo World Report also gave positive reviews about the 3D graphics, music, characters, and the changes to battles, but criticized the inconsistencies in the presentation overall and found the new battle types not that exciting. Parkin indicated that the original appeal of the series—catching every Pokémon—"remains resolutely undiminished after all this time." Conversely, Edge claimed some of the series' "original magic had been lost across so many iterative updates" and criticized its unsteady framerate in 3D mode.

With the updated Player Search System (PSS) present at all times on the touchscreen, providing a seamless transition from solo play to player-to-player battles and trades, integration of online play was praised as "masterly" by Parkin. McElroy described it as "completely interconnected experience, which is exactly how Pokémon is meant to be played". Otero proclaimed the PSS "makes Pokémon X and Y feel dramatically new and more modern". The optional aspects of Pokémon-Amie and Super Training had mixed reception. Hilliard described the minigames of Super Training as forgettable. McElroy viewed these aspects as positively reinforcing bonds between trainers and their Pokémon, with Pokémon-Amie making them seem more like pets. Otero praised Super Training for making competitive training more accessible to players.

In contrast to the praise for the games' visuals, the story was poorly received. Otero described the story and character personalities as "pretty disappointing for a predominantly single-player RPG." McElroy described the campaign as "rigidly formulaic". However, Hilliard called some of the interactions with non-playable characters "bizarre... and often entertaining". Parkin criticized it as "thin and melodramatic" and "sometimes jarringly preachy". They also considered some of the games' puzzles to be clumsy. The layout of the Kalos region itself was described as disappointingly straightforward for players who enjoy exploring but inviting to new players in the franchise. This ease of access was exemplified through subtle additions and changes to gaining experience. More readily available experience allowed players to use more Pokémon throughout the campaign and rotate through a team greater than six.

Pokémon X and Y were nominated for Best RPG and Best Handheld Game at the 2013 VGX Awards. In 2014 it won the Golden Joystick Award for Handheld Game of the Year. During the 17th Annual D.I.C.E. Awards, the Academy of Interactive Arts & Sciences nominated Pokémon X and Y for "Handheld Game of the Year" and "Role-Playing/Massively Multiplayer Game of the Year".

=== Sales ===
According to Media Create sales data, over 1.26 million copies of Pokémon X and Y were pre-ordered in Japan, not including copies bundled with Nintendo 3DS hardware, making it the most reserved Nintendo 3DS title to date in the region. Within three days of release, the games sold a record 2.09 million retail copies in Japan. Over 4 million copies of the games were sold worldwide in the first weekend, making X and Y the fastest–selling game on the 3DS. At the time, they were the fastest-selling 3DS titles in the Americas, but were later surpassed by Pokémon Sun and Moon. Within three months of release, by December 2013, the games were the best-selling titles for the 3DS with 11.61 million copies sold worldwide. They remained at the top through at least 2016, before being outsold by Mario Kart 7 in 2017. As of 31 March 2023, the games have sold 16.68 million units worldwide, making them the second best-selling games for the Nintendo 3DS behind Mario Kart 7 and just ahead of Pokémon Sun and Moon.
