= Pokémon the Series: Sun & Moon – Ultra Legends =

Twenty-second season of the Pokémon animated television series

- Season 22
- Pokémon the Series: Sun & Moon: Ultra Legends international logo
- No. of episodes: 54

Release
- Original network: TV Tokyo
- Original release: October 21, 2018 – November 3, 2019

Season chronology
- ← Previous; Ultra Adventures Next → Journeys

Pokémon the Series: Sun & Moon – Ultra Legends is the twenty-second season of the Pokémon anime series and the third and final season of Pokémon the Series: Sun & Moon, known in Japan as Pocket Monsters: Sun & Moon (ポケットモンスター サン&ムーン, Poketto Monsutā: San & Mūn). It originally aired in Japan from October 21, 2018, to November 3, 2019, on TV Tokyo.

The season follows Ash Ketchum as he continues attending the Pokémon School in the Alola region with Lillie, Lana, Mallow, Kiawe and Sophocles.

The season premiered in the United States from March 23, 2019, to March 7, 2020, on Disney XD, as it was the final season to air on television in the country. Starting with the next season, Pokémon Journeys: The Series, the English dub moved to online streaming releases via Netflix in the United States due to Netflix acquiring distribution licensing for the series.

== Episode list ==
Jap. overall (Note: The English episode numbers are based on their first airing in the United States on Disney XD. Other English-speaking nations largely follow either this order or the Japanese order.)	Eng. overall	No. in season	English title Japanese title	Original release date	English air date
1034	1027	1	"Lillier and the Staff!" (The Hero Lilliel and the Alolan Cane!); Transliteration: "Yūsha ririeru to arōra no tsue!" (Japanese: 勇者リリエルとアローラの杖！)	October 21, 2018	March 23, 2019
The Pokémon School is putting on a play written by Rotom, and the group and all their Pokémon are participating. However, everyone's family has been invited, including Ash's mother Delia, which makes the group nervous. To make things worse, a copy of the script winds up in Jessie's hands, causing Team Rocket to barge in. Meanwhile, an unusual and independent Eevee being chased by a Houndour winds up on board a cruise ship that has just left port.
1035	1028	2	"A Haunted House for Everyone!" (Ghost Pokémon Everywhere! Everyone's Haunted House!!); Transliteration: "Gōsutopokemon dai shūgō! Min'na no obakeyashi!" (Japanese: ゴーストポケモン大集合！みんなのお化け屋敷！)	October 28, 2018	March 24, 2019
Lana's younger sisters Harper and Sarah learn about haunted houses and decide that they want to go to one. However, with none in the region, the group and the visiting Acerola and her Mimikyu decide to make one at the Pokémon School. However, when it's set up, a group of Ghost-type Pokémon, attracted by Mimikins, soon appear and drag the group into a mystery world. Meanwhile, a playful Wailord causes some crates (inside one of which Eevee is napping) to fall overboard from the cruise ship; finding itself literally at sea, a panicked Eevee falls overboard and is rescued by a Mantine.
1036	1029	3	"Sparking Confusion!" (Wela Volcano: Golone, Golonya and the Hikers!); Transliteration: "Vu~era kazan, gorōngorōnya ya ma o toko!" (Japanese: ヴェラ火山、ゴローンゴローニャやまおとこ！)	November 4, 2018	March 25, 2019
Some strange signals have started coming from Wela Volcano which are interfering with the process Lusamine uses to track the Ultra Wormholes so she sends the Ultra Guardians to Wela Volcano to investigate. However, instead of finding more Ultra Beasts, they instead find a group of rock hunters with an Alolan Geodude and Graveler who appear to be illegally mining Spark Stones, the food of the local Rock Pokémon. Meanwhile, Eevee and Mantine are travelling together and having a great time.
1037	1030	4	"Don't Ignore the Small Stufful!" (Rocket-Dan and Nuikoguma!); Transliteration: "Roketto-dan to nuikoguma!" (Japanese: ロケット団とヌイコグマ！)	November 11, 2018	March 26, 2019
Since Burnet forgot to take her lunch to work at Aether Paradise, Ash hitches a ride with Lillie to go there to deliver it. However, when there, they found that Team Rocket has once again managed to get inside Aether Paradise with a nefarious plan to steal all the Pokémon being conserved there. To top it off, a Stufful from Aether Paradise has gone missing. Meanwhile, Eevee and Mantine have arrived at an island; after saying goodbye to its friend and chasing after a Wimpod, Eevee makes itself at home.
1038	1031	5	"No Stone Unturned!" (Fukuthrow the Master!!! Mokuroh the Sleeperzzz); Transliteration: "Takumi no fukusurō! ! ! Nemuri no mokurō zzz" (Japanese: 匠のフクスロー！！眠りのモクローzzz)	November 18, 2018	March 27, 2019
Ash has decided to explore more of Melemele Island and runs into a Pokémon Trainer named Hau, who turns out to be the grandson of Island Kahuna Hala. Hau mentions that he and his partner Dartrix are currently training for the Melemele Island Grand Trial and gets excited when he learns that Ash has already completed it. After seeing Rowlet's evolved form, Ash challenges Hau to a battle, but through an accident he and Rowlet end up losing. Hau agrees to a rematch the next day; can Ash and Rowlet come up with a new move to defeat Dartrix? Meanwhile, an unfortunate attempt to play with a Pyukumuku causes Eevee to meet Pikachu and the Pokémon gang.
1039	1032	6	"Bright Lights, Big Changes!" (The Duo Splits Up!? Satoshi and Rotom); Transliteration: "Konbi kaisan! ? Satoshi to rotomu" (Japanese: コンビ解散！？サトシとロトム)	November 25, 2018	March 28, 2019
Ash, his Pokémon and Rotom are visiting the set for Rotom's favorite Detective TV show. However, when Rotom notices a plot-hole, it barges onto the set during filming and shows off its complete knowledge of the show causing Ash to panic. In doing so, Rotom catches the eye of the producer, who decides to cast Rotom in the show, which may mean Rotom and Ash parting ways. Meanwhile, Eevee has had the best day ever playing with Pikachu and the Pokémon gang, but when they finally have to go home Eevee feels lonely.
1040	1033	7	"We Know Where You're Going, Eevee!" (Where is Eievui Going? To the End of the World for the Sake of a Meeting!); Transliteration: "Ībui doko iku no? Ano ko ni ai ni doko made mo!" (Japanese: イーブイどこいくの？あのコに会いにどこまでも)	December 2, 2018	March 29, 2019
After a long voyage, Eevee has made it to Alola and been befriended by Pikachu and the gang's various Pokémon. Now it's lonely and wants to find its new friends. While searching, Eevee sees Popplio with Lana and follows them; however, it is spotted by the local Alolan Persian, who starts chasing it. When Popplio spots Eevee being chased, it follows to help. To make matters worse, the Team Skull grunts have also spotted Eevee, decide they want it and start fighting over it, causing Ash and the gang to come to Eevee's aid. After being rescued, Eevee decides that it wants Lana as its trainer and partner, and is given the nickname "Sandy" by her.
1041	1034	8	"Battling the Beast Within!" (The Lightning that Blocks Wind! Its name is Zeraora!!); Transliteration: "Kaze o tatsu inazuma! Sononaha zeraora! !" (Japanese: 風を断つ稲妻！その名はゼラオラ！！)	December 9, 2018	March 30, 2019
While training for a possible Poni Island Grand Trial, Ash and Pikachu once again encounters Tapu Koko and ask it for a battle. The clashing electric attacks create a portal that drags Ash and Pikachu into a mysterious world, one which has been destroyed and left in ruins. They discover that this is the world of the mysterious Ultra Beast, Guzzlord. Guzzlord attacks them, but a mysterious Trainer and the Mythical Pokémon Zeraora comes to their rescue.
1042	1035	9	"Parallel Friendships!" (Fire it Off! The Twin Gigavolt Havoc of Friendship!!); Transliteration: "Hanate! Yūjō no tsuinsupākingugigaboruto! !" (Japanese: 放て！友情のツインスパーキングギガボルト！！)	December 16, 2018	April 6, 2019
Ash and Pikachu find themselves in front of the Pokémon School, but in a parallel dimension. Dia, the mysterious Trainer, and Zeraora are determined to continue their fight against Guzzlord, who is responsible for all the destruction in this version of Hau'oli City. Even though Dia and Zeraora do not seem receptive to the idea, Ash comes up with a plan for all of them to combine their attacks to stop Guzzlord and possibly send it back through the Ultra Wormhole so that Ash and Pikachu will return to his own dimension.
1043	1036	10	"Alola, Alola!" (An Alola in Alola! Takeshi and Kasumi!); Transliteration: "Arōra de arōra! Takeshi to Kasumi!" (Japanese: アローラでアローラ！ タケシとカスミ！)	December 23, 2018	April 20, 2019
Ash's old friends Brock and Misty have come to Alola to visit. While Brock studies the workings of the local Pokémon Center, Ash and the gang show Misty all the hotspots, including the pancake shop, the jewelry accessories shop and even go Mantine Surfing to Treasure Island. However, Team Rocket members soon shows up with a new plan and a new mecha to steal everyone's Pokémon.
1044	1037	11	"Heart of Fire! Heart of Stone!" (A Passionate Heart That Smashes Even Rocks! Lychee and Takeshi!!); Transliteration: "Iwa o mo kudaku atsuki hāto! Raichi to Takeshi! !" (Japanese: 岩をも砕く熱きハート！ライチとタケシ！！)	January 6, 2019	April 27, 2019
Ash, Brock, Misty and the gang decide to go to Akala Island so Brock can meet Island Kahuna Olivia, on whom Brock has developed a major crush. Naturally, when they do meet up with Olivia, Brock immediately falls madly in love with her, leaving Olivia a bit bewildered. When Olivia learns that Brock is the Rock-type Gym Leader, she challenges him to a battle, which is interrupted by Team Rocket.
1045	1038	12	"That's Some Spicy Island Research!" (Poni Island Research Project! Search for the Island King!!); Transliteration: "Poni shima no jiyukenkyū! Shima kingu o sagase! !" (Japanese: ポニ島の自由研究！しまキングをさがせ！！)	January 13, 2019	May 4, 2019
Ash and the gang travel to Poni Island to work on various research projects. Ash's project is to complete his final Grand Trial and decides to look for the Island Kahuna, but after learning that there currently is not one he is not sure what to do. Soon afterwards, a trainer named Hapu appears and attacks Ash, thinking that he has stolen some vegetables from her field, despite it actually being the work of Team Skull.
1046	1039	13	"Showdown on Poni Island!" (Decisive Lugarugan Battle! Satoshi VS Glazio!!); Transliteration: "Rugarugan kessen! Satoshi VS Gurajio! !" (Japanese: ルガルガン決戦！サトシVSグラジオ！！)	January 20, 2019	May 11, 2019
Ash once again asks Hapu to battle him but she angrily refuses. Gladion appears on Poni Island and states that he's there to meet Tapu Fini. As Lillie and Gladion talk, Gladion brings up their father; they then agree to face each other in a battle, but it is broken up before it can begin by Ash (who arrives via a kick from Hapu's Mudsdale). Ash challenges Gladion to a Lycanroc battle: Midnight vs. Dusk.
1047	1040	14	"Evolving Research!" (We Have a Sea and We Have a Valley! Great Intensive Pokémon Evolution Training!!); Transliteration: "Umi ari tani ari! Pokemon shinka dai tokkun! !" (Japanese: 海あり谷あり！ポケモン進化大特訓！！)	January 27, 2019	June 1, 2019
Sophocles decides that his Poni Island project will be to evolve his Charjabug, so Hapu tells him that the electrical energy around Vast Poni Canyon will allow him to do so. Ash, Kiawe and Sophocles head to the canyon where they find Horacio, their rival from the Charjabug Race, and his group, who are there to for the same reason. Meanwhile, Lana decides to train her Popplio with her old friend Ida and her recently-evolved Primarina.
1048	1041	15	"Run, Heroes, Run!" (Run Kaki! Surpass Yourself!!); Transliteration: "Hashire kaki! Onore o koete! !" (Japanese: 走れカキ！己を超えて！！)	February 3, 2019	June 8, 2019
With no actual Island Challenge on Poni Island, Ash decides to battle Island Guardian Tapu Fini in place of the Challenge, so he and Kiawe rush to the Ruins of Hope. However, when Tapu Fini does not appear, Ash and Kiawe decide to battle to pass the time. Tapu Fini is angered by this and captures Ash and his Pokémon. A mysterious old man tells Kiawe that in order to free Ash and appease Tapu Fini, Kiawe must get an item from Tapu Lele on Akala Island and return with it to Poni Island before a certain time limit expires.
1049	1042	16	"Memories in the Mist!" (Inside Kapu-Rehire's Mist); Transliteration: "Kapu-Rehire no kirinonakade" (Japanese: カプ・レヒレの霧の中で)	February 10, 2019	June 15, 2019
After Ash and Kiawe tell everyone of their encounter with the old man at the Ruins of Hope, Hapu tells them that the Island Guardian of Poni Island has a special power which allows people to see and meet with loved ones that have long since passed from this world; hearing this, Mallow gets really upset. When the gang visit Hapu at her house, a mysterious mist comes from the Ruins of Hope. Ash, Mallow, Lillie, Gladion and their Pokémon try to make their way through it, but while Ash and Mallow each encounter a beloved figure from the past, Lillie and Gladion's search is in vain. Hapu goes to the Ruins of Hope to get Tapu Fini to stop, but ends up with an encounter of her own.
1050	1043	17	"A Grand Debut!" (The Birth of an Island Queen! Satoshi's Grand Trial!!); Transliteration: "Shima kuīn tanjō! Satoshi no dai shiren! !" (Japanese: しまクイーン誕生！サトシの大試練！！)	February 17, 2019	June 22, 2019
Following her standing up to Tapu Fini, Hapu has finally become the Island Kahuna of Poni Island, and Ash challenges her to her Grand Trial. Her trial requires Ash to battle her with just one Pokémon. With Hapu using her Mudsale, Ash and Pikachu face a tough battle.
1051	1044	18	"Keeping Your Eyes on the Ball!" (Hole in One at PokéGolf!); Transliteration: "Pokegorufu de ōruinwan" (Japanese: ポケゴルフでホールインワン！)	February 24, 2019	June 29, 2019
Ash and the gang meet legendary Poké-Golfer Kahili, who has been on a losing streak lately, and her Toucannon partner Touckey. It's the first time that the gang has seen Poké-Golf, a popular Alolan version of Golf in which both trainer and Pokémon must work together, and are fascinated, so they ask Kahili to teach them how to play.
1052	1045	19	"Show Me the Metal!" (Arrival in Alola! Dripping Metal Panic!!); Transliteration: "Arōra jōriku! Tarutarumetarupanikku! !" (Japanese: アローラ上陸！タルタルメタルパニック！！)	March 3, 2019	July 6, 2019
Some mysterious and unknown Pokémon that eat metal have arrived on Melemele Island, and start wreaking havoc across the island, including eating the tools at the Pokémon School, the equipment in the Ultra Guardians' headquarters and James's precious bottle cap collection. James is enraged and decides to chase down this rare Pokémon to get his revenge.
1053	1046	20	"Got Meltan?" (Discovering a New Species! Get, Meltan!); Transliteration: "Shinshu hakken! Merutan, Gettoda ze! !" (Japanese: 新種発見！メルタン、ゲットだぜ！！)	March 10, 2019	July 13, 2019
Professor Oak has finished his research on the mysterious Pokémon Ash reported and names it Meltan, a Steel-type Mythical Pokémon. One of the Meltan has grown attached to Ash's Rowlet and stows away in Ash's backpack with Rowlet to join them all at the Pokémon School, but after an incident with a Murkrow, it loses its Hex-Nut. Rowlet tries to replace it but nothing he tries seems to work, so he and Meltan head out to find its Hex-Nut. However, they run into Team Rocket, who have found Meltan's Hex-Nut and are still after all the Meltan so that James can avenge him.
1054	1047	21	"This Magik Moment!" (A New Program!? Melody of the Small Koiking); Transliteration: "Shin Bangumi! ? Chīsana Koikingu no Merodi" (Japanese: 新番組！？小さなコイキングのメロディ)	March 17, 2019	July 20, 2019
Sophocles is on a TV quiz show, so Ash and the gang come to the station to cheer him on. While there, they see the filming of a series starring a Magikarp; however, the Magikarp seems to have something wrong with it. On another TV show, the regular actresses do not show up in time, which leads to Lana, Mallow and Lillie being cast as replacements.
1055	1048	22	"Beauty is Only Crystal Deep!" (Beauty and Nyarth!); Transliteration: "Byūtī ando Nyarth!" (Japanese: ビューティー・アンド・ニャース！)	March 24, 2019	July 27, 2019
A new Ultra Beast, Pheromosa, has appeared and started attacking trainers and stealing their Z-Crystals. The Ultra Guardians are tasked with stopping Pheromosa. Pheromosa steals Team Rocket's Z-Crystals, but while trying to stop it, Meowth falls in love with Pheromosa.
1056	1049	23	"The Dealer of Destruction!" (Emperor of Destruction Guzma!); Transliteration: "Hakai no Teiō Guzuma!" (Japanese: 破壊の帝王グズマ！)	March 31, 2019	August 3, 2019
After much planning, Professor Kukui has finally announced the formation of the Pokémon League in Alola. While the rest of Alola (including Team Rocket trio) celebrates and gets ready, Team Skull's boss Guzma is enraged and decides that he will destroy the Alola League, and heads over to the Pokémon School to confront Kukui. Before things can get ugly, Ash challenges Guzma to a battle with his Pikachu vs. Guzma's Golisopod.
1057	1050	24	"The Secret Princess!" (Lilie and the Secret Mechanical Princess!); Transliteration: "Rīrie to Himitsu no Kikō Hime!" (Japanese: リーリエと秘密の機巧姫！)	April 7, 2019	August 10, 2019
Since their experience on Poni Island made them realize that their father Mohn is still alive, Lillie and Gladion return to Aether Paradise and go through their father's papers, hoping to find some clues. Back at the family mansion, Lusamine shows them Mohn's old office, where Lillie discovers her father's old Z-Ring and the inoperative Mythical Pokémon Magearna. Lillie goes to Kahuna Hala and asks for permission to use her father's Z-Ring, and they have a battle to see if Lillie can master Z-Moves.
1058	1051	25	"Drawn with the Wind!" (Shaymin, Meltan, Nagisa! The Lost Explorers!!); Transliteration: "Sheimi, Merutan, Nagisa! Maigo no Tanken-tai! !" (Japanese: シェイミ、メルタン、ナギサ！迷子の探検隊！！)	April 14, 2019	August 17, 2019
Ash and the gang travel to picturesque Malie City on Ula'ula Island. When a strong wind blows Mallow's hair ornament away, Shaymin chases after it, followed by Sandy and Meltan. Unfortunately, Team Rocket trio, who are also in Malie City, spots the trio and goes after them to catch them.
1059	1052	26	"Aiming for the Top Floor!" (Aim for the Top Floor! The Explosive Dragon Gym!!); Transliteration: "Saijōkai o Mezase! Bakuon no Doragonjimu! !" (Japanese: 最上階を目指せ！爆音のドラゴンジム！！)	April 21, 2019	August 24, 2019
Having learned about the Kantonian Gym in Malie City from their new friend Charlie Charma, Ash and the gang decide to visit it, but while the gym is supposed to be like a Kanto Gym, the rules are not quite the same: a challenger has to face one of the three Gym Trainers and Charlie on each floor in a "game" in order to reach the top floor. After only Ash and Kiawe make it to the top floor they find that the "Gym Leader", Dragon-type Trainer Ryuki, has a "rock star" battle style which quickly defeats Kiawe's Marowak. Rowlet starts off for Ash, but when Meltan jumps in to help its friend, it becomes a double-battle.
1060	1053	27	"A High-Speed Awakening!" (Superspeed Kuwagannon! The Awakening of Māmane!!); Transliteration: "Chōsoku no Kuwagannon! Māmane Kakusei! !" (Japanese: 超速のクワガノン！マーマネ覚醒！！)	April 28, 2019	August 31, 2019
Sophocles and his rival Horatio have a re-match, only now in a Vikavolt race, with the Trainers directing via virtual reality headsets and a Buginium-Z crystal as First Prize. Team Rocket trio disguises Meowth as a Vikavolt with James directing, and breaks in on the action in order to steal all the competing Vikavolts.: Note: This is the last episode of the Pokémon anime to air in the Heisei Period.
1061	1054	28	"The One That Didn't Get Away!" (Suiren Fishes a Kyogre!?); Transliteration: "Suiren Kaiōga wo Tsuru!?" (Japanese: スイレン、カイオーガを釣る！？)	May 5, 2019	September 7, 2019
While everyone else is Pokémon-fishing, Ash, Pikachu and Lana are walking on top of the sea inside Brionne's bubbles. During a race, they get pulled into a whirlpool caused by the Legendary Pokémon Kyogre, who has been poisoned, but as they try to cure Kyogre a group of Pokémon Hunters attack and try to capture it.: Note: This is the first episode of the Pokémon anime to air in the Reiwa Period.
1062	1055	29	"A Recipe For Success!" (Mao's Valiant Effort! The Forest Pokémon Café!!); Transliteration: "Mao funtō! Mori no pokemon kafe! !" (Japanese: マオ奮闘！森のポケモンカフェ！！)	May 12, 2019	September 14, 2019
Mallow needs some special ingredients for her restaurant recipes, so she and Tsareena go to visit Orangaru at his Forest Cafe, where they find Team Rocket's Meowth chilling out. When the Cafe gets swamped with Pokémon customers, she immediately pitches in to help. Everything Mallow makes turns out delicious, but then Tapu Koko turns up as a customer. Meanwhile, Island Kahuna Olivia pitches in as a replacement waitress at Mallow's family's restaurant.
1063	1056	30	"Spying For The Big Guy!" (You're Being Watched! Rocket-Dan's Alola Forms!!); Transliteration: "Kanshi shimasu! Roketto-dan arōra no su gata! !" (Japanese: 監視します！ロケット団アローラのすがた！！)	May 19, 2019	September 21, 2019
After lying to Team Rocket Headquarters that they've captured Bewear, Team Rocket trio find that HQ has sent a team headed by Matori and the Alolan Meowth to locate them and bring back Bewear with them, which means Jessie, James and Meowth must come up with a plan to forestall this.
1064	1057	31	"A Fiery Training Camp Trick!" (Master the Z-Move! Kaki's Fierce Boot Camp!!); Transliteration: "Z Waza o kiwamero! Shakunetsu no kaki gasshuku! !" (Japanese: Zワザを極めろ！灼熱のカキ合宿！！)	May 26, 2019	September 28, 2019
It's time to start training for the Alola League, and Ash, Kiawe and Sophocles are using Kiawe's family's farm as their Z-Move training camp. Kiawe's Turtonator acts as big brother/trainer to everyone, especially Sophocles' Vikavolt and Kiawe's Marowak, but Sophocles' lack of stamina, battle experience and self-confidence may mean he will not be able to stay the course.
1065	1058	32	"Living on the Cutting Edge!" (Perfect Sharpness! Kamiturugi has Arrived!!); Transliteration: "Kireaji batsugun! Kamiturugi kenzan! !" (Japanese: 切れ味バツグン！カミツルギ見参！！)	June 2, 2019	October 5, 2019
Several incidents have occurred all over Alola where objects have been mysteriously sliced to pieces. After some investigating, the culprit turns out to be the new Ultra Beast Kartana. The Ultra Guardians attempt to handle it but must also deal with a giant meteor heading straight for the Pokemon School.
1066	1059	33	"A Timeless Encounter!" (Satoshi, Encounter Beyond Time!); Transliteration: "Satoshi, Toki wo koeta deai!" (Japanese: サトシ、時を超えた出会い！)	June 9, 2019	October 12, 2019
On the same day that Professor Burnet finds an old photo of Professor Kukui as a boy with a Litten and Ash and his Pokémon are training in the forest, the Mythical Pokémon Celebi turns up in Alola and accidentally sends Ash and Torracat back into the past, where they meet a very excitable (and familiar) 5-year-old boy (Professor Kukui in childhood) with a Litten who already got Firium Z, whom Ash nicknames "Roarie" and who is awed by Ash's battling ability. The boy asked Ash to use his Firium Z. Ash performed the Inferno Overdrive after remembering from Kiawe. Later, Ash helps the totem Pokémon and from the Cutieflies that was in the bushes of it and then finally received his own Firium Z.
1067	1060	34	"Pikachu's Exciting Adventure!" (Pikachu's Exciting Expedition!); Transliteration: "Pikachū no dokidoki tanken-tai!" (Japanese: ピカチュウのドキドキ探検隊！)	June 16, 2019	October 19, 2019
Ash and Torracat have vanished, right in front of Pikachu, Rotom and the others, leading Ash's Pokemon to try and find them.
1068	1061	35	"Chasing Memories, Creating Dreams!" (Gladio & Lillie! Chasing A Father's Phantom!!); Transliteration: "Gurajio to Rīrie! Chichi no gen'ei o otte!!" (Japanese: グラジオとリーリエ！父の幻影を追って！！)	June 23, 2019	October 26, 2019
Everybody, including Team Rocket trio, is getting more and more excited about the approaching debut of the Alola League. Lillie and Mallow, with everybody's encouragement, continue to train to master their Z-moves; Gladion continues his search for his and Lillie's missing father and meets an unexpected old Pokémon friend; and the Masked Royal makes an announcement concerning the Alola League that stuns everybody.
1069	1062	36	"League Offenders and Defenders!" (The Curtain Rides! Alola Pokémon League!!); Transliteration: "Kaimaku! Arōra Pokemon Rīgu!!" (Japanese: 開幕！アローラポケモンリーグ！！)	June 30, 2019	November 2, 2019
Ash and the gang have finally arrived at Manalo Stadium, the site of the Alola League Conference. However, Team Rocket and Team Skull are there as well, and Guzma is more determined than ever to destroy the Alola League Manalo Conference.
1070	1063	37	"Battle Royal 151!" (Brawl! Battle Royale 151!!); Transliteration: "Dai rantō! Batoru roiyaru 151!!" (Japanese: 大乱闘！バトルロイヤル151！！)	July 7, 2019	November 9, 2019
The Alola League Manalo Conference finally officially begins with a "Battle Royal" in which 151 trainers, each using only one Pokemon, will compete against each other, with all four Island Kahunas as referees and the last remaining 16 combatants moving on to Round Two.
1071	1064	38	"Battling Besties!" (Mao and Suiren! Super Full-Force Friendship Battle!!); Transliteration: "Mao to Suiren! Yūjō no zenryoku batoru!" (Japanese: マオとスイレン！友情のゼンリョクバトル！)	July 14, 2019	November 16, 2019
The Manalo Conference is down to 16 competitors, and Ash and Faba are set to battle! Pikachu lets Meltan take the spotlight—and that it does, winning the match against Faba's Hypno. Then, Ilima and Kangaskhan take on Guzma and Scizor, but after undergoing Mega Evolution, Kangaskhan falters and is defeated. In the third match, Hau's Raichu uses speed to overtake Principal Oak's Exeggutor. Finally, Lana and Mallow face off, but Mallow nearly gives up when she starts falling behind. Lana encourages her to persevere, and Mallow and Tsareena pull off their first Z-Move! Lana and Primarina end up winning the match, but Mallow's still happy for her friend!
1072	1065	39	"The Battlefield of Truth and Love!" (Musashi VS Kojirō! Battlefield of Truth and Love!!); Transliteration: "Musashi VS Kojirō! Ai to shinjitsu no batoru fīrudo!!" (Japanese: ムサシVSコジロウ！愛と真実のバトルフィールド！！)	July 21, 2019	November 23, 2019
As the Manalo Conference continues, it's time to decide on four more competitors to move to the next round, First up is Sophocles and Vikavolt against Mina and Ribombee, and while Ribombee is powerful, it's no match for Vikavolt's Signal Beam. Then, it's a Team Rocket showdown as James and Mareanie take on Jessie and Wobbuffet. The match is close, but James decides to give it his all—and wins. After that, Kiawe and Marowak defeat Acerola and Rapooh in a ghostly clash, and Lillie and Snowy face off against Gladion and Umbreon. Lillie's skills are impressive, but Gladion still pulls off the win, On to the next round.
1073	1066	40	"Imitation is the Sincerest Form of Strategy!" (Overcome Junaiper!); Transliteration: "Junaipā o kōryaku seyo!" (Japanese: ジュナイパーを攻略せよ！)	July 28, 2019	November 30, 2019
Rowlet is determined to battle Decidueye in Ash's Manalo Conference Quarterfinals match against Hau, but first it needs some additional training. And just in the nick of time, Toucannon and its flock arrive to teach Rowlet a new move! Meanwhile, at Manalo Stadium, Gladion and his Lycanroc defeat James and Mareanie…and then Ash is up next! Rowlet enters the battlefield dressed in a Decidueye costume, which ends up becoming a decoy against the real Decidueye's Sinister Arrow Raid attack, With Rowlet still standing, how will the rest of the match play out?
1074	1067	41	"Battling on the Wing!" (A Soaring Showdown! Brave Bird vs. Sky Attack!!); Transliteration: "Tori-jō kessen! Bureibubādo VS goddobādo!!" (Japanese: 鳥上決戦！ブレイブバードVSゴッドバード！！)	August 4, 2019	December 7, 2019
The Manalo Conference Quarterfinals continue at a lightning pace, and Ash and Rowlet are in the midst of their battle with Hau and Decidueye. The attacks fly furiously—just like the competitors themselves—until it appears that Rowlet is unable to battle. But Hala notices that Rowlet has not lost yet...it is actually just sleeping! The battle restarts and, after mastering a new move, Rowlet finally ends up victorious! Then, Kiawe and Charizard face off against Sophocles and Vikavolt, and the latter two successfully pull off a Z-Move—will Charizard be able to escape the devastating attack?
1075	1068	42	"The Road to the Semi-Finals!" (Everybody's Fully Powered! The Road to the Semi-Finals!!); Transliteration: "Min'na zenryoku! Junkesshō e no michi!!" (Japanese: みんなゼンリョク！準決勝への道！！)	August 11, 2019	December 14, 2019
As the Manalo Conference Quarterfinals rage on, Kiawe and Charizard face off against Sophocles and Vikavolt in the third battle. Both sides show impressive offense and defense, making it clear they've trained hard. But Vikavolt's Wild Charge attack is not enough to stop Charizard's Supersonic Skystrike Z-Move, and Kiawe and Charizard end up on top! In the fourth match, Lana and Primarina battle Guzma and Golisopod, but Guzma's intense battling style takes Lana and Primarina by surprise. Despite a valiant effort, Primarina takes significant damage and loses the battle, but everyone agrees Guzma won fair and square. Next up are the semifinals: Kiawe versus Gladion and Ash versus Guzma.
1076	1069	43	"The Final Four!" (The Semi-Finals! Kaki vs. Gladio!!); Transliteration: "Junkesshō! Kaki VS Gurajio!!" (Japanese: 準決勝！カキVSグラジオ！！)	August 18, 2019	December 21, 2019
Four Trainers are ready to compete in the Manalo Conference Semifinals: Ash, Gladion, Guzma, and Kiawe. Mimo has come to cheer Kiawe on, but after getting lost on the way to the stadium, she is confronted by Team Skull, Gladion saves the day—and then goes on to battle her big brother. The first match of the semifinals reflects much hard work and skill by both Trainers. When Marowak is knocked out, Kiawe brings out Turtonator—and when it defeats Gladion's Lycanroc, he calls for the mighty Silvally! Now it remains to be seen who will emerge victorious and move on.
1077	1070	44	"Getting Down to the Ire!" (Rising Fire! There's More Than One Rival!!); Transliteration: "Moeagaru honō! Raibaru wa hitori janai!!" (Japanese: 燃え上がる炎！ライバルはひとりじゃない！！)	August 25, 2019	December 28, 2019
In the first match of the Manalo Conference Semifinals continuing, Gladion changes Silvally into a Fire-type at the perfect moment to withstand Turtonator's Z-Move and defeat Kiawe, Then, it's Guzma and Scizor versus Ash and Torracat. Guzma immediately uses U-turn to switch Scizor out for Golisopod, and the battle seems to be going well. But after taking damage, Golisopod suddenly returns to its Poké Ball, forcing Scizor back into the battle—and directly into the path of Torracat's Fire Blast, It's super effective! Scizor is defeated in a single hit, and as Guzma loses his temper and yells furious at Golisopod, everyone is left to wonder—what will happen next?
1078	1071	45	"The Wisdom Not To Run!" (Undefeated Emperor Guzma!!); Transliteration: "Muhai no teiō Guzuma!" (Japanese: 無敗の帝王グズマ！)	September 1, 2019	January 4, 2020
Scizor has been defeated and Guzma has only Golisopod. Torracat continues to battle, but eventually is defeated despite the poison. Ash chooses Pikachu as his second Pokemon, but Golisopod proves to be a tough opponent. However, the secret behind Guzma's being undefeated is about to be revealed.
1079	1072	46	"Final Rivals!" (The Finals! Ultimate Rival Showdown!!); Transliteration: "Kesshōsen! Saikyō raibaru taiketsu!!" (Japanese: 決勝戦！最強ライバル対決！！)	September 8, 2019	January 11, 2020
The night before the Manalo Conference Finals, Delia, Mimey and Professor Oak arrive at Manolo Stadium to cheer for Ash. The wild Meltan also arrive, and with their help, much to everyone's surprise, Meltan evolves into Melmetal! The next day is the final battle between Ash and Gladion on a 3-on-3 match. Gladio starts with Silvally and Melmetal makes its battle debut for Ash. When Silvally defeats Melmetal, Ash sends in Pikachu, who defeats Silvally. Gladion then sends in Lycanroc, who uses moves it should not know how to use.
1080	1073	47	"Enter the Champion!" (The Rise of Alola's Champion!!); Transliteration: "Tanjō! Arōra no hasha! !" (Japanese: 誕生！アローラの覇者！！)	September 15, 2019	January 18, 2020
Gladion's "Lycanroc" is revealed to be Mohn's Zoroark. In a clash of Z-moves, both Zoroark and Pikachu are knocked out. Now comes the final battle one-on-one that will determine the first-ever Alola League Champion: Gladion's Midnight-type Lycanroc vs. Ash's Dusk-type Lycanroc. At long last, our hero wins the Manalo Conference and is finally officially crowned as the first-ever Alola League Champion!
1081	1074	48	"Z-Move Showdown!" (Akuziking Invasion! The Great Z-Move Battle!!); Transliteration: "Akujikingu shūrai! Z-Waza daisakusen! !" (Japanese: アクジキング襲来！Zワザ大決戦！！)	September 22, 2019	January 25, 2020
Ash has been crowned as the very first Alola League Champion, but before the celebrations can get underway, an Ultra Wormhole opens and a huge Ultra Beast crashes down which Ash and Pikachu recognize: Guzzlord! More Ultra Wormholes open and two more Guzzlords emerge. Ash and the gang, Gladion, Hau, the Masked Royal, Lusamine and the Aether Foundation team, the Island Kahunas, the Island Guardian Pokémon, Team Rocket, Bewear, their new Mecha-Bewear and a former Pokémon of Ash's must all band together to stop the Guzzlords before Manalo Stadium is destroyed.
1082	1075	49	"Exhibition Unmasked!" (Final Battle! Satoshi vs. Kukui!!); Transliteration: "Fainaru batoru! Satoshi tai Kukui! !" (Japanese: ファイナルバトル！サトシ対ククイ！！)	September 29, 2019	February 1, 2020
The Guzzlords have been sent back through the Ultra Wormholes, but The Masked Royal is unmasked and revealed to be Professor Kukui! Now it's not just teacher vs. student but now Battle Royal Dome Champion vs. Alola League Champion in a 6-on-6 exhibition battle. The first Pokemon out are Torracat for Ash and Incineroar for Kukui. It's a fierce battle until Torracat overexerts himself and Ash switches him out with Lycanroc, who then injures Incineroar, forcing Kukui to switch him out with Braviary.
1083	1076	50	"A Full Battle Bounty!" (Burn! Swell Up! Full Battle!!!); Transliteration: "Moeru! Minagiru! ! Furubatoru! ! !" (Japanese: 燃える！みなぎる！！フルバトル！！！)	October 6, 2019	February 8, 2020
Lycanroc is taken down by Braviary and is replaced by Rowlet, taking the battle to the air! Rowlet takes out Braviary and Kukui brings out Venusaur, who takes down Rowlet. Ash brings back Torracat, who takes out Venusaur. Ash recalls Torracat, and the next face-off is Kukui's Empoleon vs. Ash's Pikachu, but Ash then recalls Pikachu and sends in Melmetal, who knocks out Empoleon. Kukui sends in Incineroar, who defeats Melmetal. Kukui recalls Incineroar and sends out Lucario, but Ash sends out Naganadel.
1084	1077	51	"Fiery Surprises!" (Conclusion! Gaogaen vs. Nyaheat!!); Transliteration: "Ketchaku! Gaogaen VS Nyahīto! !" (Japanese: 決着！ガオガエンVSニャヒート！！)	October 13, 2019	February 15, 2020
Ash and Professor Kukui are both now down to three Pokemon, and the battle is now even fiercer and more fiery! After Naganadel takes down Lucario, Then, it's Torracat's rematch with Incineroar. Both Ash and Professor Kukui used their Z Moves Inferno Overdrive and the flames burn hotter than ever, when the smoke clears, Torracat is on top! Triumphant, it suddenly evolves and becomes an Incineroar itself but all the excitement leaves it too exhausted to continue. Just as Professor Kukui is about to send out his sixth and final Pokémon, Tapu Koko appears—and decides that it wants to battle Ash instead! Just how will Ash approach this history-making matchup?
1085	1078	52	"From Z to Shining Z!" (Alola's Strongest Z! Kapu-Kokeku VS Pikachu!!); Transliteration: "Arōra saikyō no Z! Kapu-kokeko VS Pikachū! !" (Japanese: アローラ最強のZ！カプ・コケコVSピカチュウ！！)	October 20, 2019	February 22, 2020
As the Manalo Conference's exhibition match nears its climax, Tapu Koko appears—it wants to team up with Professor Kukui and battle Ash! Our hero responds by sending out Naganadel, and the clash of Island Guardian and Ultra Beast powers is an amazing sight. But Tapu Koko manages to overpower Naganadel, so Ash turns to Pikachu, his last Pokémon standing. Tapu Koko raises the stakes as it and Professor Kukui unleash a legendary Z-Move reserved for Island Guardians, but Ash and Pikachu rise to the challenge with their own Z-Move: 10,000,000 Volt Thunderbolt. Once the dust clears, Tapu Koko is defeated and Ash and Pikachu finally are victorious!
1086	1079	53	"Dreams of the Sun and Moon!" (The Sun, the Moon, and Everyone's Dreams!); Transliteration: "Taiyō to tsuki to, min'na no yume!" (Japanese: 太陽と月と、みんなの夢)	October 27, 2019	February 29, 2020
With the end of the Alola League Manalo Conference, life returns to normal, but as vacation draws near our friends must now decide what they're going to do with their lives and what their dreams are. Sophocles's is to become an astronaut; Lana's to explore the oceans; Mallow's to make her family restaurant even better; Kiawe's to one day become the next Akala Island Kahuna and Lillie's to revive Magearna... but what about Ash's?
1087	1080	54	"Thank You, Alola! The Journey Continues!" (Thank You, Alola! The Start of New Journeys!!); Transliteration: "Arigatou Arora! Sorezore no tabidachi!!" (Japanese: ありがとうアローラ！それぞれの旅立ち！！)	November 3, 2019	March 7, 2020
Ash has decided to leave Alola and return to Pallet Town before he decides to travel the entire Pokémon world, but he can't quite bring himself to tell the others. Lillie, Gladion and Lusamine will also be leaving Alola soon to find Mohn. In addition, Team Rocket trio have been ordered back to Headquarters and the time to part ways with Mimikyu, Mareanie, Bewear and Stufful is rapidly approaching.

== Music ==
The Japanese opening song is "Your Adventure" (キミの冒険; Kimi no Bōken) by Taiiku Okazaki. The ending songs are "Notebook of the Heart" (心のノート, Kokoro no Nōto) by the Hino City Nanaomidori Elementary School Choir, "Type: Wild 2019" (タイプ：ワイルド2019, Taipu: Wairudo 2019) by Shoko Nakagawa. The English opening song is "The Challenge of Life" performed by Dani Marcus and the Sad Truth. Its instrumental version serves as the ending theme.

== Home media releases ==
Viz Media and Warner Home Video have released the series in the United States on three two-disc volume sets that contain 18 episodes each. The only bonus features on each release are a creditless opening and closing sequence.

The first: "The Last Grand Trial", was released on September 8, 2020, The second: "The Alola League Begins!", was released on January 12, 2021, and the final release: "The First Alola League Champion", was released on May 4, 2021.
