= Popplio, Brionne, and Primarina =

Pokémon species

- Pokémon characters
- From left to right: Brionne, Primarina, and Popplio as they appear in Pokémon Scarlet and Violet.
- First game: Pokémon Sun and Moon (2016)
- Voiced by: English: Eileen Stevens (2017-2018) Laurie Hymes (since 2018); Japanese: Rikako Aikawa (Popplio); Risa Shimizu (Brionne and Primarina)

In-universe information
- Species: Pokémon
- Type: Water (Popplio, Brionne); Water and Fairy (Primarina)

Popplio (/ˈpɒpliːoʊ/), Brionne (/briːˈɒn/), and Primarina (/ˌpriːməˈriːnə/), known as Ashimari (Japanese: アシマリ, Hepburn: Ashimari), Osyamari (Japanese: オシャマリ, Hepburn: Oshamari), and Ashirene (Japanese: アシレーヌ, Hepburn: Ashirēnu) in Japan, are a trio of Pokémon species in Nintendo and Game Freak's Pokémon franchise. The three were introduced in the 2016 video games Pokémon Sun and Moon. Popplio is a Water-type pinniped Pokémon that is primarily blue. After gaining enough experience, it evolves into Brionne, and then into Primarina.

Responses to the trio have generally been mixed. Popplio was met with a strong negative reception upon its debut for its design, though it has retrospectively been viewed in a better light due to the designs of its evolutions.

== Concept and design ==
Popplio, Brionne, and Primarina are a trio of species of fictional creatures called Pokémon created for the Pokémon media franchise. Developed by Game Freak and published by Nintendo, the Japanese franchise began in 1996 with the video games Pokémon Red and Green for the Game Boy, which were later released in North America as Pokémon Red and Blue in 1998. In these games and their sequels, the player assumes the role of a Trainer whose goal is to capture and use the creatures' special abilities to combat other Pokémon. Some Pokémon can transform into stronger species through a process called evolution via various means, such as exposure to specific items. Each Pokémon has one or two elemental types, which define its advantages and disadvantages when battling other Pokémon. A major goal in each game is to complete the Pokédex, a comprehensive Pokémon encyclopedia, by capturing, evolving, and trading with other Trainers to obtain individuals from all Pokémon species.

All three first appear in the sequel titles Pokémon Sun and Moon. When developing the games, director Shigeru Ohmori wanted to put the spotlight on the Pokémon themselves, re-examining the concept of them as living creatures and how humans interact with them. In an interview, he described "nature" and "abundant life" as two of the central themes of the game, while also wanting to explore concepts of "Pokémon that have a more playful element or a gimmick". As the games also represented the 20th anniversary of the franchise, the development team were encouraged to explore a "funny element" to Pokémon design, as it was seen as a special occasion. Consideration however was also given to "find a balance of cool [and] serious" Pokémon designs that would fit the game's Alolan region, which was based on Hawaii.

Popplio are sea lion Pokémon that can do tricks and form water bubbles from their "clown-like nose". Around its neck is a light blue ruff, which extends past its shoulders. It has four flippers. The front flippers are larger than the hind flippers. Popplio is able to snort bubbles of water from its nose, which it uses as part of its battle strategy. On land, it uses the elasticity of its bubbles to perform acrobatic stunts and jumps. It evolves into Brionne, which takes on a more feminine appearance, gaining a dress-like design along its body. Brionne is stated to be a highly positive Pokémon to the point of putting on a facade and hiding its sadness around others. Brionne later evolves into Primarina. Primarina can manipulate the water bubbles with its voice, allowing it to control and move them at will.

== Appearances ==
Popplio originally appeared in Pokémon Sun and Moon and later Pokémon Ultra Sun and Ultra Moon as a first partner Pokémon. Popplio can evolve into Brionne, and later Primarina, after gaining enough experience. Primarina has a unique "Z-Move"- a one time use powerful attack- named "Oceanic Operetta," which involves Primarina using its voice to attack the opponent with a massive water bubble. They are not obtainable in the base version of the games Pokémon Sword and Shield or Pokémon Scarlet and Violet; instead, they were added as part of post-game downloadable content for each: The Isle of Armor and The Indigo Disk. Popplio and its evolutions have also appeared in Pokémon spin-offs, including Pokémon Go, and as a partner Pokémon to the character Elio in Pokémon Masters EX.

In the anime, Lana, a protagonist in the Pokémon the Series: Sun & Moon, owned a Popplio as her main Pokémon. Lana's Popplio evolved into Brionne and then Primarina during the course of the series. In the Pokémon Adventures manga, Popplio is owned by Professor Kukui and later becomes a Primarina.

== Reception ==
In contrast to the positive reactions to Rowlet and Litten, Popplio initially received negative reactions across social media platforms; however, these reactions have generally become more neutral or positive over time, leading many to see Popplio as a polarizing addition. A 2016 community poll by Destructoid ranked Popplio as the least popular Pokémon starter. In a Twitter poll held by The Pokémon Company International, Popplio was the least popular of the three starters, receiving only 21 percent of the vote. According to Kotaku's Patricia Hernandez, Popplio "attract[ed] indifference, hate, or worse, straight-up pity." She further stated that "I disliked him. He didn't seem as cool or as cute as Rowlet or Litten, and there was just something about his doofy face that made it easy to hate him." During the voting of Polygon staff on which is the best Pokémon starter of Pokémon Sun and Pokémon Moon, none of them voted Popplio. Multiple writers decried Popplio's design as the worst of the starters, with negative comparisons being made to prior first partner Pokémon Piplup. Megan Farokhmanesh of The Verge described Popplio as "very ugly," also further criticizing its design. Multiple negative aspects to its design, such as its clown-like design, and goofy atmosphere, as well as its similarities to previous seal-like Pokémon in the series, were highlighted as reasons for the negativity. Other reasons were highlighted by Paste writer Janine Hawkins, who stated that Popplio's confidence led to it being considered a Pokémon that was fine on its own, and in conjunction with its design, did not have design quirks that led to being well-liked in comparison to other Pokémon introduced in Sun and Moon, such as Rowlet and Mimikyu.

In response to the criticisms, Pokémon Sun and Moon director Shigeru Ohmori stated that "I personally think that Popplio was very cute and he'll be very popular with a lot of people." Vice writer Joel Golby responded positively to the creature, highlighting its "fun" design and the associated atmosphere that came with it, while Donald Theriault of Nintendo World Report highlighted the underdog status of the creature, expressing excitement for the Pokémon's future evolutions. As a result of negative perceptions towards the Pokémon, supporters of Popplio began to defend the creature, with writer Christian Hoffer of Polygon noting how Popplio's fans formed a 'Popplio Defense Squad' dedicated to send out "positive vibes." A subreddit dedicated to the creature was formed, and massive amounts of fanworks, such as fanart, were created based around the Pokémon. The reactions to Popplio became so intensive that they led to the creature becoming an internet meme.

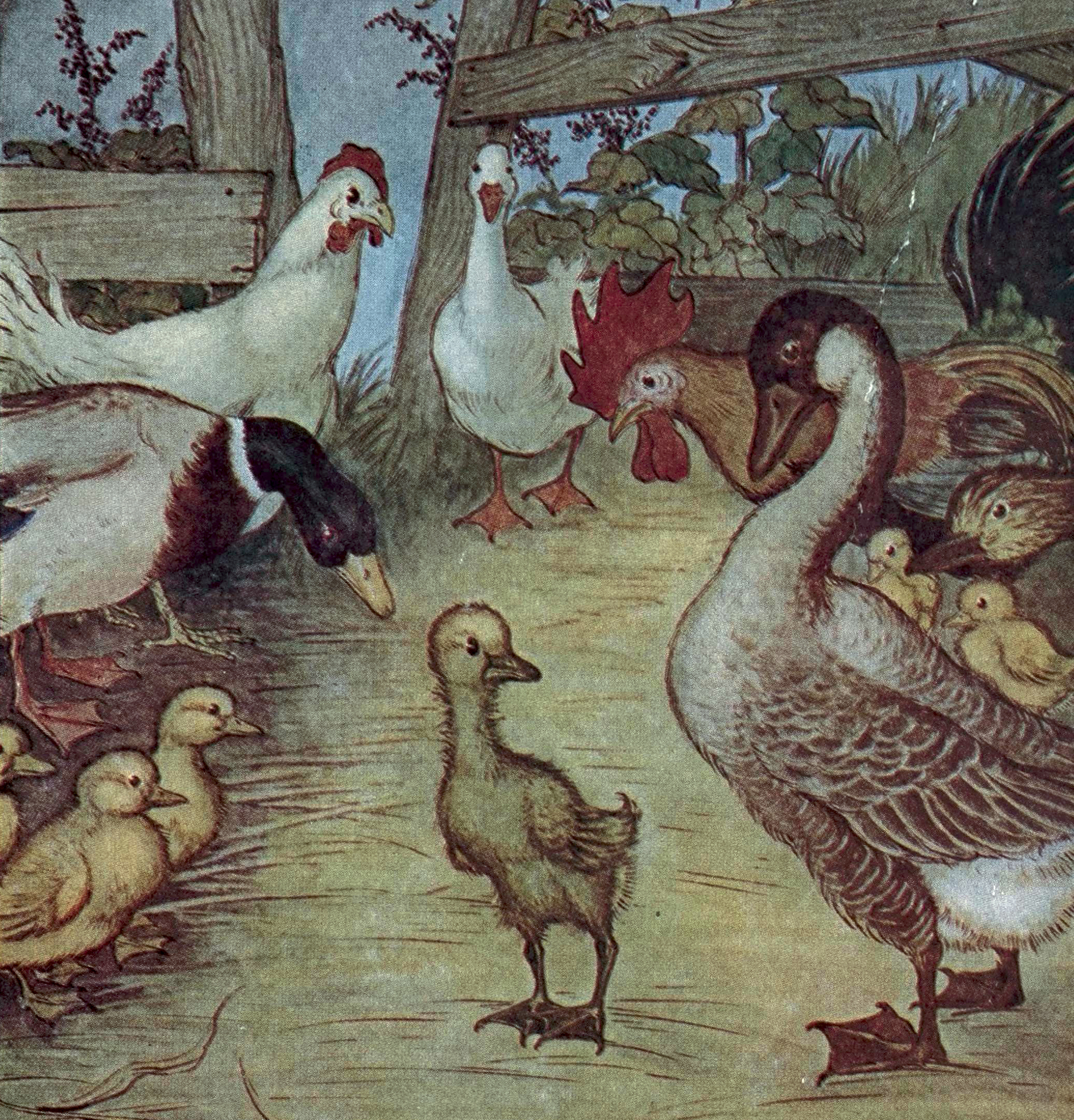
Popplio's evolutionary family was considered similar to the ugly duckling.

Popplio's further evolutions, Brionne and Primarina, were noted as drastically changing perceptions of Popplio. Brionne received mixed responses initially, with The Verge's Megan Farokhmanesh noting that it seemed awkward in terms of design. Its more feminine design was criticized by fans, in part due to the fact that Brionne could be both male and female. Patricia Hernandez of Kotaku cited the negativity around the feminine aspects of Brionne's design as representing a negative stigma surrounding femininity in association with strength, stating that "by looking 'feminine,' Brionne isn't afforded the chance to also be considered 'cool' or 'strong' by some people, and that sucks." Similarly to Popplio, many rushed to defend Brionne's design, with supporters of the Pokémon growing at a large rate. In contrast to the polarized response to Popplio and Brionne, Primarina's design was particularly noted for turning around the negative perception of Popplio, with many choosing to select Popplio in Pokémon Sun and Moon due to Primarina's reveal. However, this notably caused backlash with those who initially supported Popplio, with many criticizing others for supporting Popplio only after Primarina's reveal. Many users on social media websites wrote messages of apology to the Pokémon following Primarina's reveal. Primarina's design was highlighted for being beautiful and elegant.

Brionne and Primarina were additionally noted for representing and symbolizing growth and the process of growing up, with many noting, both positively and negatively, that the evolutionary line was similar in nature to the ugly duckling story. Polygon writer Allegra Frank noted that Popplio symbolized how many "were downright hard to look at in our youth" citing that its evolution into Brionne showed the Pokémon becoming more confident. They further stated that "Popplio is a precious flower, a gorgeous soul and a true beauty." Farokhmanesh noted this further, stating that they "saw a little of myself reflected in your big, soggy eyes. I think I always have." They further highlighted the growth of Popplio into the "majestic" and "confident" Primarina.
