= Team Skull =

Pokémon crime syndicate

- Pokémon organization
- Logo
- First appearance: Pokémon Sun and Moon
- Genre: Role-playing video game

In-universe information
- Type: Street gang
- Location: Alola
- Leader: Guzma

Team Skull is a fictional organization introduced in the 2016 video games Pokémon Sun and Moon. They are residents of the fictional region Alola, based on Hawaii, who are known for harassing people for money and Pokémon in part to support themselves. They are led by a man named Guzma. Other members include the "big sister" of the group, Plumeria, and Gladion, the son of Lusamine, who utilizes Team Skull towards her own ends and the primary villain of Sun and Moon. They have also appeared in other games, including the Pokémon Trading Card Game.

Team Skull has been well received, being among the most popular part of Sun and Moon due to a variety of factors. Kotaku' writer Gita Jackson attributed this popularity to them being "useless losers", and identified them as a particularly popular cosplay following the game's release. They have been positively compared to other villainous teams in the series, such as Team Rocket, regarded as among the best of these teams.

== Concept and design ==
A depiction of the grunts and major members: Guzma on the left, Plumeria in the middle, and Gladion on the right.

Developed by Game Freak and published by Nintendo, the Pokémon franchise began in Japan in 1996 with the release of the video games Pokémon Red and Blue for the Game Boy. In these games, the player assumes the role of a Pokémon Trainer whose goal is to capture and train creatures called Pokémon. Players use the creatures' special abilities to combat other Pokémon, both in the wild as well as those used by other Trainers. Antagonistic teams are commonly found in the series committing various crimes, including stealing Pokémon.

Created for the 2016 games Pokémon Sun and Moon, Team Skull is a street gang existing in the region of Alola, a fictional location inspired by Hawaii, and are led by a man named Guzma. Often coming from difficult backgrounds, they attempt to steal money in order to support themselves, and also try to steal Pokémon from other trainers.

Guzma, the group's leader, is described as looking out for people in a similar situation as his, while Plumeria serves as a "big sis" or "mom" figure to the grunts. Guzma utilizes a Pokémon named Golisopod as his strongest Pokémon. Plumeria, meanwhile, has a Salazzle as one of her Pokémon. Team Skull Grunt outfits utilize a black and white color palette, wearing matching uniforms incorporating skull bandanas and necklace pendants. Gladion, the brother of major character Lillie, is also a member of the group, serving as one of the player character's rivals.

== Appearances ==
Team Skull serves as an antagonist group in the video games Pokémon Sun and Moon, composed of people who failed the island challenge, a series of challenges that takes trainers across the islands of the game's region, Alola. They are seen harassing residents, challenging the protagonist to Pokémon battles when confronted. They operate out of Po Town, an area they took over. The player encounters and battles various members throughout the game, including its leader Guzma, Plumeria, and Gladion, whose mother, Lusamine, leads an organization called the Aether Foundation. Lusamine acts as a benefactor to Team Skull, and in return, Team Skull carries out operations at her behest. Team Skull makes attempts to kidnap Lusamine's daughter Lillie and her Pokémon Cosmog; this prompts Gladion to leave the team and ally with the protagonist to rescue them from the Aether Foundation. Guzma aids Lusamine, who opens the "Ultra Wormhole" to unleash a new type of Pokémon called an Ultra Beast into Alola. Lusamine enters the Ultra Wormhole with Guzma, the latter who is found defeated, having been possessed and now terrified. He eventually disbands Team Skull. In the enhanced versions of Sun and Moon, titled Pokémon Ultra Sun and Ultra Moon, the story goes similarly, except that Team Skull aids the protagonist against a new group called Team Rainbow Rocket after beating the game.

Team Skull, as well as Guzma and Plumeria, are featured in various cards in the Pokémon Trading Card Game. In the mobile game Pokémon Masters EX, various versions of Guzma, Plumeria, and Gladion appear as playable characters. In Pokémon Go, the player's character can be dressed up in various outfits and costumes, with two sets of costumes being the male and female Team Skull outfits. Team Skull's animated pose can also be used by the player. Team Skull appears in the Pokémon TV series, starting with the first episode of Pokémon the Series: Sun & Moon, where protagonist Ash Ketchum battles them. In a later episode, Team Skull gets into an encounter with Jessie, James, and Meowth, members of the fellow antagonist team Team Rocket.

== Promotion and reception ==
=== Promotion ===
As part of advertising for the games, actors portraying Team Skull were featured in various commercials, including runner Usain Bolt and comedian Ayako Imoto. Team Skull-themed merchandise has also been released, including pins, clothing, and a digital Nintendo 3DS theme.

=== Reception ===
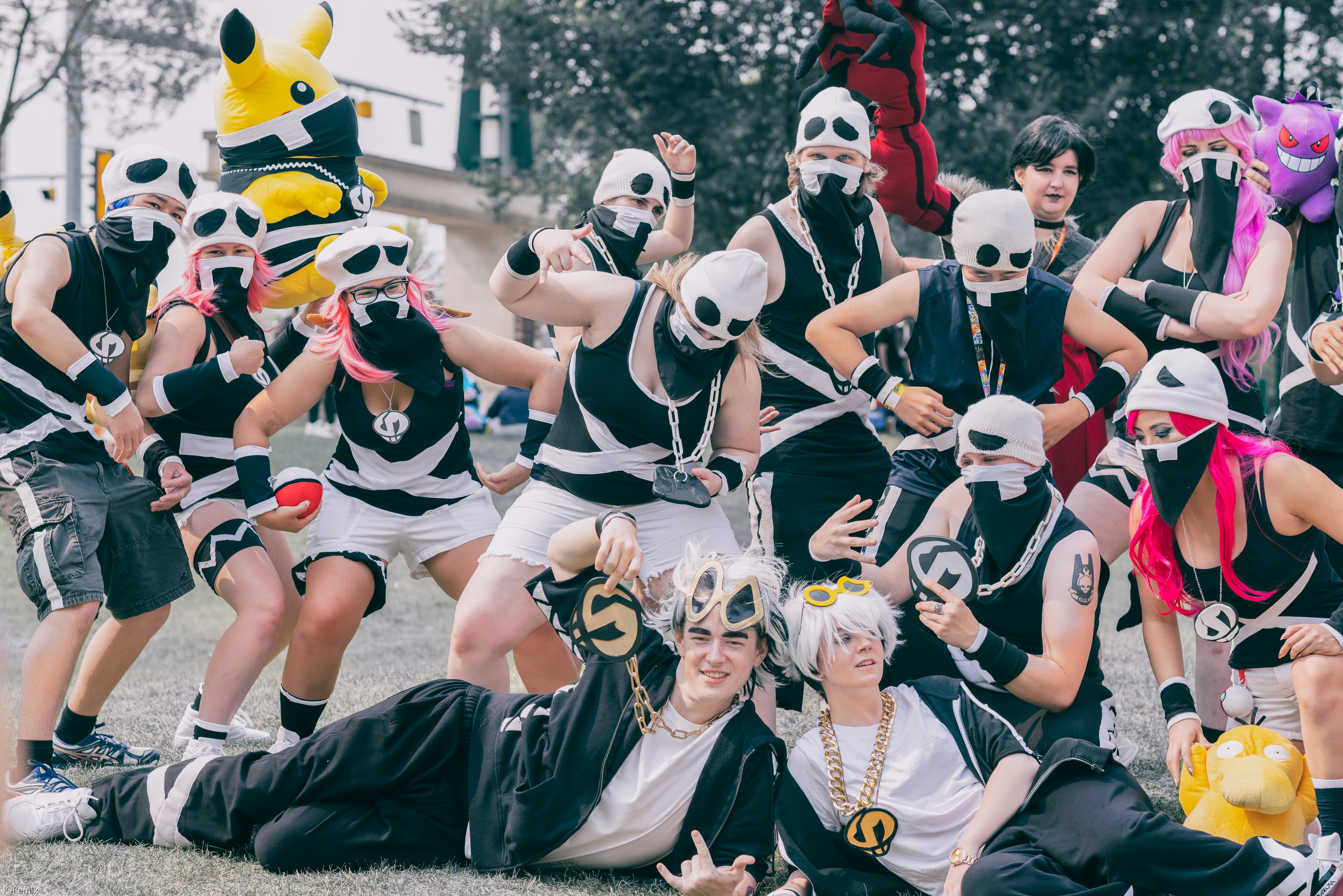
Following the release of Sun and Moon, cosplay of Team Skull became very popular.

Team Skull has been generally well received, particularly with Pokémon fans. Kotaku writer Gita Jackson explained that their popularity was so high because the team was made up by "useless losers", Jackson stating they felt a parental urge towards its members. They identified Guzma as a particularly popular member of the team. Following the release of Sun and Moon, cosplay depicting Team Skull became popular, particularly at MAGfest 2017, where cosplayers would often stay in character and chant "Team Skull" at people. On the social media website Tumblr, Team Skull became very popular with its users, being the subject of many user-generated music videos using the program MikuMikuDance, to depict members of Team Skull dancing and singing to various songs, including the song that popularized the trend, "You Reposted in the Wrong Neighborhood".

Inside Games writer Sawasdee Otsuka stated that Team Skull represented a new trend in antagonistic teams in the Pokémon series. He argued that, where such teams previously committed their crimes with "ambition and purpose", Team Skull's members lacked that, describing them as people who had become estranged from the region's culture. Destructoid writer Chris Carter remarked how much he enjoyed Team Skull, exclaiming his appreciation for how "laughably bad" they could be. He stated that, while previous antagonistic groups in the series were "legitimately insidious", he liked how they were instead portrayed as black sheep. Anime News Network writer Callum May commented that they were primarily viewed as nuisances in the games by Alola's residents, stating that while they find Team Rocket "pathetic", they couldn't help themselves in loving the team and finding them cute. They stated that they could be better off with better support, appreciating seeing Guzma reformed in games after Sun and Moon. Fanbyte writer Cian Maher likened them to Team Yell from Pokémon Sword and Shield, describing Skull as a less malevolent force than the Aether Foundation. He found them to be a "classic iteration of rebellious youth", stating that the Team Skull members seem inspired by 1970s punk rock.

Team Skull is considered among the best antagonist teams in Pokémon, with RPGFan writer Neal Chandran stating that a popular sentiment he'd seen in polls, fan sites, and blogs is that Team Skull "may be the best villainous team in a Pokémon game since Team Rocket". He compared the team to Jessie, James, and Meowth, who he says shares the "mischievous miscreants" archetype with Team Skull. USgamer writer Jake Green considered Team Skull the best of these teams, stating that Team Skull matched the series' "whimsical nature" in a way that a team like Team Rocket did not. He enjoyed how they were composed of "snot-nosed loser kids with something to prove" in a world they don't fit into. Gita Jackson agreed, stating that while they initially enjoyed beating them early on in the games, they came to view them as the games' best characters. They said that the encounter in Po Town helped solidified their status for them, and that they wished they could join Team Skull themselves.

Chandran stated that Team Skull was the first thing that came to mind whenever he thought of Sun and Moon, stating that the game would be worse off without them and their "sick rhymes, ill dance moves, cartoony mannerisms, funky fresh musical themes, simple-yet-effective outfits", and "overall vibe". He enjoyed that they did not seem to take themselves seriously compared to other Pokémon teams, appreciating how they seemed to have a "surprising amount of depth" that made them sympathetic. He stated that, despite being the "bad guys", he rooted for them, commenting that the Aether Foundation using Team Skull to their own ends represents the upperclass exploiting the underclass. Chandran felt that Team Skull's struggles in Alolan society mirrors the "deeper truth" of Hawaii. including high levels of poverty, homelessness, and cost of living. He compared Team Skull to a tent community of Native Hawaiians who have been priced out of their homes by colonization, believing that members of Team Skull are natives of Alola who suffered from Alola becoming a "playground destination for wealthy Pokémon trialists/tourists". Chandran remarked that, while he was initially amused by a grunt demanding a paltry sum, in hindsight, he found it sad how desperate the grunt must have been.
