= Mimikyu =

Pokémon species

- Pokémon character
- Mimikyu artwork by Ken Sugimori
- First game: Pokémon Sun and Moon (2016)
- Designed by: Megumi Mizutani
- Voiced by: Billy Bob Thompson

In-universe information
- Species: Pokémon
- Type: Ghost and Fairy

Mimikyu (/ˈmiːmiːkjuː/; Japanese: ミミッキュ, Hepburn: Mimikkyu) is a Pokémon species in Nintendo and Game Freak's Pokémon franchise. Designed by Megumi Mizutani for the 2016 video games Pokémon Sun and Moon, it is referred to as the "disguise Pokémon" in the series due to its appearance, which resembles a ragdoll form of Pikachu, the series mascot. Since Mimikyu's debut, it has appeared in multiple games and the Pokémon Trading Card Game, as well as the anime adaptation of the series where it is voiced by Billy Bob Thompson.

Classified as a Ghost- and Fairy-type Pokémon, Mimikyu appears as a short creature with a crude Pikachu disguise over its body, and a stick serving as the disguise's tail. Its actual body under the disguise is a black blob with two round eyes, and it moves by dragging its body along the ground. Mimikyu is a lonely creature who wears the disguise in order to seek affection from humans within the Pokémon world, though in the anime one developed animosity towards Pikachu, often attacking it on sight. Mimikyu's lore and personality have received positive receptions from both critics and fans of the series.

== Design and characteristics ==
Mimikyu is a species of fictional creatures called Pokémon created for the Pokémon media franchise. Developed by Game Freak and published by Nintendo, the Japanese franchise began in 1996 with the video games Pokémon Red and Green for the Game Boy, which were later released in North America as Pokémon Red and Blue in 1998. In these games and their sequels, the player assumes the role of a Trainer whose goal is to capture and use the creatures' special abilities to combat other Pokémon. Each Pokémon has one or two elemental types, which define its advantages and disadvantages when battling other Pokémon. A major goal in each game is to complete the Pokédex, a comprehensive Pokémon encyclopedia, by capturing, evolving, and trading with other Trainers to obtain individuals from all Pokémon species.

Mimikyu first appears in the sequel titles Pokémon Sun and Moon. When developing the games, director Shigeru Ohmori wanted to put the spotlight on the Pokémon themselves, re-examining the concept of them as living creatures and how humans interact with them. In an interview, he described "nature" and "abundant life" as two of the central themes of the game, while also wanting to explore concepts of "Pokémon that have a more playful element or a gimmick". As the games also represented the 20th anniversary of the franchise, the development team were encouraged to explore a "funny element" to Pokémon design, as it was seen as a special occasion. Consideration however was also given to "find a balance of cool [and] serious" Pokémon designs that would fit the game's Alolan region, which was based on Hawaii.

Mimikyu is a small Pokémon, standing 8 inches (0.2 m) tall. The Pokémon itself hides underneath a tattered cloak with a crudely drawn face on its head. The overall disguise is shaped like a Pokémon called Pikachu and is a meta-referential element of the Pokémon franchise; its imitation of Pikachu references the latter's role as the series mascot. Mimikyu wears the costume in hopes of being loved and accepted, as its true form is said to be horrifying in nature. Mimikyu has two "types", elemental attributes that dictate in battle strengths and weaknesses: Ghost and Fairy. Mimikyu was designed by Megumi Mizutani. In the anime, Mimikyu is voiced by Billy Bob Thompson in English.

== Appearances ==
Mimikyu first appears in Pokémon Sun and Moon. It changes its appearance when hit by an attack. It has a special in-combat ability known as "Disguise", which allows it to avoid damage from an enemy attack once during a battle. In Ultra Sun and Ultra Moon, Mimikyu can use an exclusive Z-Move—a special, one-time use powerful attack—known as "Let's Snuggle Forever", that requires Mimikyu to know the attack "Play Rough" and hold an item called Mimikium Z. It appears as a Totem Pokémon—a special boss opponent in game—in both Sun and Moon and Ultra Sun and Ultra Moon. Mimikyu later reappears in Pokémon Sword and Shield, Pokémon Scarlet and Violet, and the Mega Dimensions downloadable content in Pokémon Legends: Z-A. Mimikyu also appears in Pokémon Unite, Pokémon Shuffle, Pokémon Masters EX, Pokkén Tournament DX, and Pokémon Pokopia.

In other media, a Mimikyu appears in the anime Pokémon: Sun & Moon, encountered by Jessie, James, and Meowth of Team Rocket, a group of recurring antagonists in the series. Meowth, a Pokémon who can also speak human language, is able to understand Mimikyu and is terrified by the unheard horrifying things it says. When the two of them begin to battle, Meowth lifts Mimikyu's disguise, and is nearly killed by the sight of its true appearance. It later allies with Team Rocket when it sees them fighting Ash Ketchum's Pikachu, expressing its hate for Pikachu as the reason it emulates the Pokémon's appearance.

Mimikyu also appears in a music video rapping about itself that was uploaded by The Pokémon Company to their YouTube channel. Mimikyu also starred alongside another Pokémon, Scraggy, in a Looney Tunes-styled animation short uploaded to the Japanese Pokémon Kids TV YouTube channel. In Super Smash Bros. Ultimate, it can be summoned with the Poké Ball item. It will assist the player character who released it and will attempt to grab and attack enemy player characters when summoned. Mimikyu also appears as a Spirit—a collectable item that can give buffs to a playable character—in game.

== Promotion and reception ==
Mimikyu's design has been the subject of significant discussion. In 2024, leaked concept art showed Mimikyu's actual body to be a black blob with two round eyes.

Mimikyu has been the subject of promotion for the series. Items featuring the character were sold in retail shops in Japan beginning on September 22, 2018, and merchandise such as plushies were released. In 2019, the Pokémon Company dedicated the month of October to Mimikyu. In 2020, a gold, silver, and platinum necklace of Mimikyu was created by U-treasure. A Halloween Mimikyu themed meal was also released in the Japanese Pokémon Cafe during the same year, while in 2021 an Ichiban Kuji for Mimikyu featured a tea and sweets theme. In 2022, an Ichiban Kuji for Mimikyu featured a café theme. On December 7, 2022, Peach John, a clothing retailer, released a collaboration with Pokémon that included a Mimikyu themed 3-piece lounge suite.

In the Pokémon of the Year poll held by The Pokémon Company, Mimikyu was voted the most popular Pokémon introduced in Sun and Moon; this also placed it 3rd overall in the competition. Kotaku's Patricia Hernandez called Mimikyu the "most brilliant and heartbreaking" Pokémon that Game Freak had created, feeling that instead of fighting Pikachu's popularity with newer designs the developers embraced it "to great effect" and represented the possible envy other Pokémon as intelligent creatures may have towards said popularity. She additionally noted Mimikyu's immense popularity with fans since it was revealed, a statement echoed by Catrina Dennis of Inverse.

In a followup article, Hernandez attributed Mimikyu's popularity to the fandom's own reaction to the "bombardment" of Pikachu in Pokémon media and merchandise, stating, "Grappling with that reality is one of the best things the Pokémon games have ever done." Edge also praised it as a "moment of self-awareness" on the part of Game Freak regarding the franchise's success, while indicating a broader change with Sun and Moon in contrast to the previous titles, "with everything shifted a few degrees away from normal." Mimikyu was highlighted by Paste as being the "voice of a generation," highlighting its immense popularity compared to other Pokémon revealed for Pokémon Sun and Moon, such as Bewear and Popplio. They highlighted that its popularity came from the fact that Mimikyu "needs" players while the other Pokémon did not, stating that it seemed "expertly tuned to grip fans' hearts and never let go," due to the emotional vulnerability the Pokémon displayed.

Other sources shared similar praise for Mimikyu's design. Dennis Carden of Destructoid described it as one of the most pleasant surprises to come out of Sun and Moon, further describing it as "perhaps the most adorably creepy Pokémon to ever be conjured up by the minds at Game Freak" and its backstory "so tragically sweet [...] To put it simply, Mimikyu is a Mimikyutie." The sentiment was shared by other contributors to the site, who echoed similar praises.
