= Pokémon Sun and Moon =

2016 video games

Pokémon Sun; Pokémon Moon
- North American box art for Pokémon Sun and Pokémon Moon, depicting the legendary Pokémon Solgaleo and Lunala respectively
- Developer: Game Freak
- Publishers: JP: The Pokémon Company; WW: Nintendo
- Director: Shigeru Ohmori
- Producers: Junichi Masuda; Shin Uwai; Takato Utsunomiya; Hitoshi Yamagami
- Designer: Shigeru Ohmori
- Programmer: Sosuke Tamada
- Artist: Takao Unno
- Writer: Toshinobu Matsumiya
- Composers: Minako Adachi; Go Ichinose; Junichi Masuda; Hitomi Sato; Tomoaki Oga; Hideaki Kuroda; Jun Fukuda
- Series: Pokémon
- Platform: Nintendo 3DS
- Release: WW: 18 November 2016; EU: 23 November 2016
- Genre: Role-playing
- Modes: Single-player, multiplayer

Pokémon Sun (Note: Japanese: ポケットモンスター サン, Hepburn: Poketto Monsutā San; "Pocket Monsters: Sun") and Pokémon Moon (Note: Japanese: ポケットモンスター ムーン, Hepburn: Poketto Monsutā Mūn; "Pocket Monsters: Moon") are 2016 role-playing video games developed by Game Freak and published by The Pokémon Company and Nintendo for the Nintendo 3DS. They are the first installments in the seventh generation of the Pokémon video game series. First announced in February 2016, Sun and Moon were released worldwide on 18 November 2016, commemorating the franchise's 20th anniversary. A pair of enhanced versions, Pokémon Ultra Sun and Pokémon Ultra Moon, were released for the same consoles on 17 November 2017.

The titles began development following completion of Pokémon Omega Ruby and Alpha Sapphire, with increased emphasis on Pokémon interactions, and relationships. They follow a young Pokémon Trainer's journey around the Alola Region—based on Hawaii—with the objective of the games being to complete the island challenge and prevent the schemes of Team Skull, and later the Aether Foundation, all while attempting to challenge various Pokémon Trainers of gradually increasing difficulty. Sun and Moon introduced 81 new Pokémon species, and new features such as Alolan forms of previous generation Pokémon, powerful moves known as Z-Moves, alien creatures known as Ultra Beasts, updated battle and training mechanics, and improved polygonal 3D graphics. While largely independent of one another, the two games follow a similar plot, and while each can be played separately, trading Pokémon between the two games is necessary to complete the Pokédex. Pokémon may also be traded in from other games just like in previous installments.

The games received generally positive reviews from critics, who welcomed the change from the formula used by prior Pokémon games and praised the gameplay. Upon release, the games became some of the fastest-selling games in Nintendo's history at that point. As of September 30, 2024, Sun and Moon have sold 16.33 million copies worldwide, making them the third-best-selling Nintendo 3DS titles, after Mario Kart 7 and their predecessors, Pokémon X and Y.

== Gameplay ==
Pokémon Sun and Moon are role-playing video games with adventure elements, set in the fictional Alola Region (loosely based on Hawaii), presented in a third-person, overhead perspective. The player controls a young Trainer who goes on a quest to catch and train creatures known as Pokémon, and win battles against other Trainers. By defeating opposing Pokémon in turn-based battles, the player's Pokémon gains experience, allowing them to level up and increase their battle statistics, learn new battle techniques, and in some cases, evolve into more powerful Pokémon. Players can capture wild Pokémon, found during random encounters, by weakening them in battle and catching them with Poké Balls, allowing them to be added to their party. Players are also able to battle and trade Pokémon with other human players using the Nintendo 3DS' connectivity features. As with previous games in the series, certain Pokémon are only obtainable in either Sun or Moon, with players encouraged to trade with others in order to obtain all Pokémon from both versions.

=== New features ===
The bottom screen in Sun and Moon is occupied by a Rotom, showing a map of the player's location. The red flag indicates a story waypoint.

Pokémon Sun and Moon are presented in fully three dimensional (3D) polygonal graphics, like their predecessors, allowing for more interactivity with the overworld and more dynamic action during battles. However, the character models in Sun and Moon possess more realistic proportions compared to chibi-styled models used in Pokémon X and Y or Pokémon Omega Ruby and Alpha Sapphire. Players are also able to customize their Pokémon Trainer's appearance, choosing gender, skin tone and hair color at the start of the game and can later acquire outfits and accessories to change their character's appearance. Joining the previous generations of Pokémon are all new species, such as the new Starter Pokémon; Rowlet, Litten and Popplio and the Pokémon that are, within the fictional Pokémon world, described as Legendary Pokémon, namely Solgaleo and Lunala.

Pokémon Sun and Moon are the first entries in the series to be available in Chinese, both Simplified and Traditional, along with English, French, Spanish, Italian, German, Japanese and Korean, for a total of nine available languages. The games introduce variants of Pokémon introduced in older games with new typings and appearances, known as Alolan Forms. Alolan Vulpix and Ninetales, which are Fire types in other regions, are respectively Ice and dual Ice and Fairy types. Alolan Sandshrew and Sandslash, which are Ground types in other regions, are Ice and Steel types. Alolan Meowth and Persian, which are Normal types in other regions, are Dark types. Some Pokémon evolutions have gained dual typings as well, such as Alolan Marowak which is now a Fire and Ghost type and Alolan Raichu, an Electric and Psychic type. Throughout the game, players utilize a Rotom-possessed Pokédex on the bottom touchscreen, which displays a mini-map containing markers for story objectives.

Pokémon Sun and Moon introduce a powerful new type of move known as Z-Moves which can only be used once per battle. Hidden moves, which were used to navigate terrain in past games, have been replaced by specialized Pokémon that can be summoned at will. The "Poké Finder" is a function of the Rotom Pokédex which allows players to take photos of Pokémon in the wild, similar to Pokémon Snap. In addition, the two games' clocks are set 12 hours apart from each other, with Sun operating on the 3DS' time and Moon operating 12 hours ahead. Character customization as previously seen in X and Y returns in Sun and Moon. A new "Pokémon Refresh" feature enables players to care for and feed their Pokémon. Mega Evolution, a game mechanic first introduced in X and Y, returns in Sun and Moon. The Battle Tree is a location which allows players to battle or team up with Pokémon trainers, including Kanto region trainers Red and Blue. Players can trade or battle with other players online. From a location called the Festival Plaza, players can participate in "Global Missions", where people from across the world work towards a set target — such as catching 100 million Pokémon collectively.

=== Connectivity ===
Pokémon caught or obtained in Pokémon X, Y, Omega Ruby and Alpha Sapphire can be transferred to Sun and Moon. The games are also compatible with Pokémon Bank, an online Pokémon storage system introduced during the previous generation of Pokémon games. In a special Pokémon Direct on 26 February 2016, Tsunekazu Ishihara from The Pokémon Company announced that Pokémon caught in the Virtual Console versions of Red, Blue, and Yellow are transferable to Sun and Moon via Pokémon Bank. Compatibility with Pokémon Bank was initially planned to be available at the games' launch but was delayed and later became available on 24 January 2017. Tomy also released a peripheral interactive toy resembling a Z-Ring, which synchronizes with the use of Z-Moves in the games.

== Plot ==
=== Setting ===
The Alola Region comprises several islands of varying sizes; from left to right: Exeggutor Island, Poni Island, Melemele Island, Akala Island, and Ula'ula Island. The white structure just south of Melemele is the very large floating structure Aether Paradise.

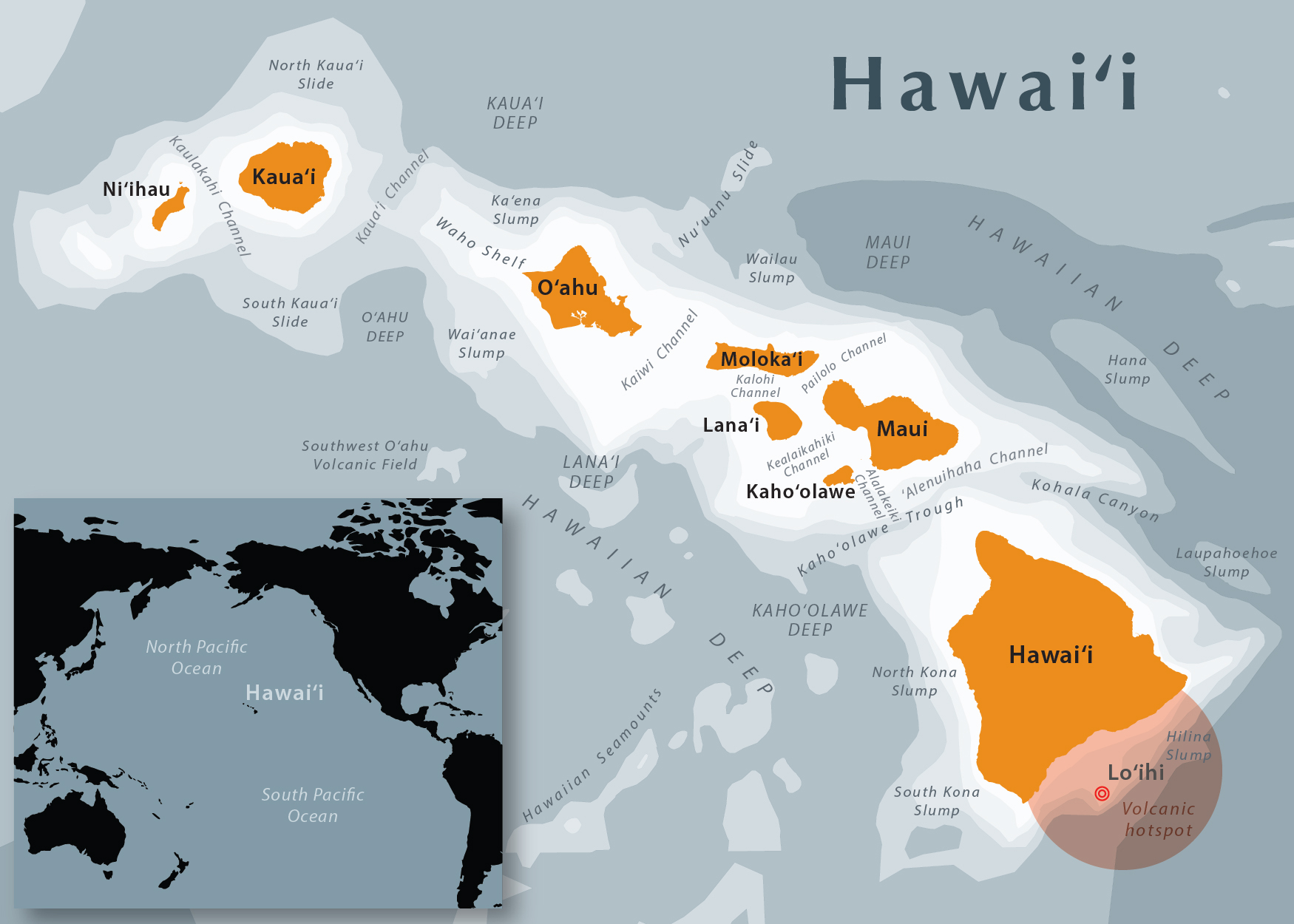
The Alola Region was heavily inspired by Hawaii, with Game Freak staff visiting the islands to conduct research for the games.

The games take place on a tropical archipelago, a group of islands known as the Alola Region. Joe Skrebels of IGN describes it as "Pokémon's take on Hawaii". During an interview at E3 2016, Shigeru Ohmori noted that Game Freak staff took trips to Hawaii to conduct research for Sun and Moon.

The leading scientist in the Alola Region is Professor Kukui, whose name comes from the kukui, also known as the candlenut, the Hawaiian state tree, continuing the trend of Pokémon professors being named after trees. Team Skull is the name of the villainous group in Alola. The Aether Foundation is an organization which studies Ultra Beasts, mysterious creatures from another dimension. Though Professor Samuel Oak does not appear in Sun and Moon, his cousin Samson Oak takes his place.

=== Story ===
The player starts off moving from Kanto Region to Melemele Island of the Alola Region with their mother. After meeting a young blonded girl named Lillie and rescuing her special Pokémon she calls Nebby, the player obtains a Starter Pokémon from local Professor Kukui and embarks on the Island Challenge, a coming-of-age custom spanning trials across Alola, along with local youngster Hau. Unlike in previous games, trials involve battles with powered-up Pokémon, followed by battles with each island's Kahuna upon completion of an island's trials. Throughout this, the player encounters Team Skull, a gang of people who quit the island trials whose members include their boss Guzma, and enforcer Gladion. The player also encounters the Aether Foundation, an organization led by a blonded woman named Lusamine aiming to shelter Pokémon from various threats.

During a visit to the Aether Foundation's base, Aether Paradise—a very large floating structure—a mysterious creature called an Ultra Beast emerges from a wormhole, but retreats before it can be defeated or captured. Later, after the player has defeated Team Skull at their base, Gladion reveals that Team Skull has been working for the Aether Foundation, kidnapping Nebby to use its powers in summoning Ultra Beasts. The player then proceeds to battle through Aether Paradise with Hau and Gladion's help, eventually defeating Aether Foundation President Lusamine, who is revealed to be Gladion and Lillie's mother. Despite this, Lusamine and Guzma manage to open an Ultra Wormhole, with the former overclocking Nebby's powers, transporting them to Ultra Space, the Ultra Beasts' dimension. This causes Nebby to evolve into a cocoon-like form while Ultra Beasts are unleashed onto Alola's islands, forcing the island Kahunas and guardian deities to fight them.

Proceeding to the final island, the player and Lillie perform a ritual to evolve Nebby into its final form — Solgaleo or Lunala depending on the version — at the island's Altar. (Note: Nebby evolves into Solgaleo at the Altar of the Sunne in Sun; in Moon it evolves into Lunala at the Altar of the Moone.) With Nebby's newfound power, the player and Lillie travel to Ultra Space and find Lusamine who, not wanting to be rescued, allows herself to be taken over by the Ultra Beast they encountered earlier, forcing the player to battle her in self-defense. After defeating the crazed Lusamine, the player returns to Alola and ascends Mount Lanakila to challenge the newly formed Alola League and defeating the Elite Four members. In the last match, they defeated Kukui to become the first-ever Alola League Champion. In the credits, the player battles Melemele's guardian deity Tapu Koko after a celebration, with Lillie and Lusamine departing Alola for Kanto the following day.

In the postgame, the player is contacted by two members of the International Police: Anabel, who was head of the Battle Tower in Pokémon Emerald, and Looker, a recurring detective since Pokémon Platinum. The player assists the two with handling the wild Ultra Beasts that Lusamine let loose into Alola in a series of quests. (Note: Ultra Beasts featured are Buzzwole and Kartana in Sun, with Pheromosa and Celesteela in Moon.) Following the final quest, Looker reveals that he saw another Ultra Beast, although Anabel dismisses this. If the player then travels to Ten Carat Hill, they will encounter Necrozma.

== Development ==
Game director Shigeru Ohmori stated that the choice of Sun and Moon as title was inspired by the two celestial bodies’ metaphorical representation of human relationships. Hawaii was chosen as the basis for the game's region following the title's determination, due to its clear nights and plentiful sunshine. Development started immediately after Pokémon Omega Ruby and Alpha Sapphire was completed and Ohmori kept his game director position. Since the games were to be released on the franchise's 20th anniversary, Sun and Moon were developed comparatively from scratch with the application of more radical changes than its predecessor. Separately, he also mentioned that the games' intended to place more emphasis on the Pokémon and the nature of the games, in addition to the player's interactions with them.

The first Pokémon of the seventh generation to be designed was Jangmo-o. Regarding the various other designs of the generation, Ohmori mentioned that "For the 20th anniversary, we wanted to have a lot of special surprises… we wanted a funny element". Pokémon from Red and Blue were the only ones to receive Alolan forms—according to Ohmori, this was as a special surprise for long-time players and simply due to the older Pokémon being more recognizable. Following the trend between newer generations of the main series, the designers of Sun and Moon focused on the motions on the full 3D models from X and Y in order to create livelier creatures.

Despite the successes of Pokémon Go, the developers stated that it did not affect the development of Sun and Moon, although it did improve public awareness of the franchise in general and that they were working to develop interactivity between the app and the main series. Ohmori added that during the development of Sun and Moon they "completely redesigned the system, and actually ended up pushing the 3DS even further to what [they] thought was the most [they] could draw out of it." With a team of around 120, the games took about three years to develop, which is comparable with other new-generation games. Later on, Kazumasa Iwao, who was responsible for the battle systems in Sun and Moon, was recruited as director for Ultra Sun and Ultra Moon.

=== Music ===
According to composer Junichi Masuda, who co-produced the game, the soundtracks used in Sun and Moon were based on traditional Hawaiian music styles. However, while it utilizes their core rhythms, Alola's music employs "completely different" melodies while still invoking a tropical island feel. On 30 November 2016 the Nintendo 3DS Pokémon Sun and Moon Super Music Complete (Note: Japanese: ニンテンドー3DS ポケモン サン・ムーン スーパーミュージック・コンプリート, Hepburn: Nintendō 3 Dī Esu Pokémon San · Mūn Sūpā Myūjikku Konpūrito), a four-disk soundtrack containing 169 songs, 160 from the games and 9 special tracks, was released in Japan. The international release, known as Pokémon Sun & Pokémon Moon: Super Music Collection, was released on iTunes on the same date.

== Promotion and release ==
On 25 February 2016, the existence of the two games was leaked when Nintendo's trademarks for them were found on the website of the European Union Intellectual Property Office. IGN pointed towards the recent introduction of a new Pokémon, Magearna, as indication the two games would be revealed. The games were officially announced the following day in a Nintendo Direct presentation that also commemorated the franchise's 20th anniversary. The games launched with support for nine languages. On 10 May, more information on the games was released through a new trailer, including new Pokémon, box art, and release dates. Pokémon Sun and Moon released in Japan, North America, and Australia on 18 November 2016, and in Europe on 23 November 2016. A comic based on Pokémon Sun and Moon launched alongside an edition of CoroCoro Comic on 15 September 2016. Early purchasers of the games received a special Munchlax holding Snorlium Z, enabling it to use an exclusive Z-Move unique to Snorlax, Munchlax's evolution, via a wireless distribution event. A Japanese trailer was unveiled on 8 September 2016. A Pokémon Sun and Moon-themed New Nintendo 3DS XL was released on 28 October 2016.

Similar to Pokémon Omega Ruby and Alpha Sapphire, a special demo was released on 18 October 2016. On 27 October 2016 during Nintendo's Financial Briefing, they stated the demo had been downloaded more than 3.5 million times, being the most popular and fastest "selling" demo in 3DS history. Pokémon Sun and Moon were the most pre-ordered games in Nintendo's history. The games were also the most anticipated 3DS releases in 2016, according to Nielsen Game Rank.

Days before their release, the games' files were leaked on to the Internet, giving software pirates access to the full game, including online functions, before their release. Nintendo took action against those who used the Internet features, banning users involved from not only using the online features of the games — even if later playing the official release — but also from accessing other 3DS online services, such as the Nintendo eShop and Miiverse.

=== Pokémon Ultra Sun and Ultra Moon ===
Pokémon Ultra Sun (Note: Japanese: ポケットモンスター ウルトラサン, Hepburn: Poketto Monsutā Urutora San; "Pocket Monsters: Ultra Sun") and Pokémon Ultra Moon (Note: Japanese: ポケットモンスター ウルトラムーン, Hepburn: Poketto Monsutā Urutora Mūn; "Pocket Monsters: Ultra Moon") are enhanced versions of Pokémon Sun and Moon developed by Game Freak and published by The Pokémon Company and Nintendo for the Nintendo 3DS. They were announced on 6 June 2017 during a Pokémon-themed Nintendo Direct presentation and were released worldwide on 17 November 2017. They feature an alternate storyline set in Sun and Moon's world, and include Pokémon and locations not available in the original games.

== Reception ==
Reception

Aggregate scores
Aggregator	Score
Metacritic	87/100
OpenCritic	95% recommend

Review scores
Publication	Score
Destructoid	9/10 (Sun)
Famitsu	38/40
Game Informer	8.5/10 (Moon)
GameSpot	8/10
GameZone	9.5/10
IGN	9/10
Nintendo Life	10/10
Nintendo World Report	8/10 (Moon)
Polygon	8.5/10
USgamer	4.5/5

=== Critical response ===
Pokémon Sun and Moon received a score of 87/100 on Metacritic based on 84 reviews, indicating "generally favorable reviews". Fellow review aggregator OpenCritic assessed that the games received "mighty" approval, being recommended by 95% of critics. This placed Sun and Moon as the 5th and 6th highest-rated 3DS games in 2016, and the 19th and 20th on the console of all time. The move from the gym system received widespread praise from critics, some of whom saw the change as a major step towards future developments of the franchise.

Japanese magazine Famitsu gave the pair a 38/40 rating. Writing for video game review site IGN, Kallie Plagge gave the games a 9/10, and said that they "switch up the formula to create an engaging adventure that improves on its predecessors", in addition to praising the streamlined battle interface and other mechanics. Alex Donaldson of VG247 remarked that the story drew him in deeper, saying "I remain more engaged in this story than in any other Pokémon tale yet". Alex Olney of Nintendo Life said that "the plot in Sun & Moon is the deepest and most ambitious Game Freak has dared attempt", he also called them the best Pokémon games ever produced, commenting that Alola's design felt natural and organic, praising Game Freak for successfully balancing additional mechanics without alienating existing fans. Chris Tapsell of Eurogamer said the games were "the best generation in more than a decade". They earned an "essential" ranking from the site.

On the other hand, Tapsell also remarked that the first few hours of the games included too many tutorials and protected gameplay. Jeremy Parish of USGamer assessed that "Z-Moves feel underwhelming" taking "way too long" despite being the most engaging campaign the series has offered in a long time, while Polygon's Allegra Frank criticized their linear gameplay and lack of content beyond the primary storyline although the games had "the most memorable Pokémon journey in years".

=== Sales ===
According to Nintendo of America, Sun and Moon were the fastest-selling titles in Nintendo's history at the time. As of 31 March 2023, Sun and Moon have sold 16.30 million copies, ranking them as the third-best-selling Nintendo 3DS titles behind both Mario Kart 7 and Pokémon X and Y. During a GameStop Q3 earnings conference call, Pokémon Sun and Moon were said to have had the most pre-orders for any video game in the last five years. It is GameStop's best-selling game of 2016, outselling Call of Duty: Infinite Warfare. On its first day of release, Pokémon Sun and Moon shipped 10 million units worldwide. The games sold over 1.9 million copies in Japan in its first three days on the market and are Nintendo's biggest game launch of all time in Europe, with the United Kingdom and France launches selling 368,000 and 450,000 copies respectively within a week out of the continent's 1.5 million sales. The European sales rose past the 2 million mark within the following week. In North America, the games sold over 3.7 million units in less than two weeks after initial release, climbing to 4.5 million by mid-January.

=== Awards ===
Year	Award	Category	Result	Ref.
2017	Golden Joystick Awards	Handheld/Mobile Game of the Year	Won	
2017	20th Annual D.I.C.E. Awards	Handheld Game of the Year	Won	
2017	British Academy Game Awards	Mobile	Nominated	
2017	British Academy Children's Awards	Game	Nominated	
2017	17th Game Developers Choice Awards	Best Mobile/Handheld Game	Nominated	
