= Pokémon Ultra Sun and Ultra Moon =

2017 video games

Pokémon Ultra Sun; Pokémon Ultra Moon
- European cover art for Ultra Sun (left) and Ultra Moon (right), depicting the Dusk Mane and Dawn Wings forms of the legendary Pokémon Necrozma respectively
- Developer: Game Freak
- Publishers: JP: The Pokémon Company; WW: Nintendo
- Director: Kazumasa Iwao
- Producers: Junichi Masuda; Shigeru Ohmori; Shin Uwai; Takanori Sowa; Takato Utsunomiya; Hitoshi Yamagami
- Programmer: Tomoya Takahashi
- Artist: Maiko Fujiwara
- Writer: Toshinobu Matsumiya
- Composers: Minako Adachi; Go Ichinose; Junichi Masuda; Tomoaki Oga
- Series: Pokémon
- Platform: Nintendo 3DS
- Release: 17 November 2017
- Genre: Role-playing
- Modes: Single-player, multiplayer

Pokémon Ultra Sun (Note: Japanese: ポケットモンスター ウルトラサン, Hepburn: Poketto Monsutā Urutora San; "Pocket Monsters: Ultra Sun") and Pokémon Ultra Moon (Note: Japanese: ポケットモンスター ウルトラムーン, Hepburn: Poketto Monsutā Urutora Mūn; "Pocket Monsters: Ultra Moon") are 2017 role-playing video games developed by Game Freak and published by The Pokémon Company and Nintendo for the Nintendo 3DS. Part of the seventh generation of the Pokémon video game series, the games are enhanced versions of Pokémon Sun and Pokémon Moon, which released the previous year. Announced in June 2017, they were released worldwide on 17 November 2017. They were the final mainline Pokémon games for the Nintendo 3DS family of systems, with the series migrating over to the Nintendo Switch the next year.

As with previous installments, the games follow the journey of a young Pokémon Trainer, taking place in the Alola Region—based on Hawaii. Differences from Sun and Moon include an alternate storyline and new gameplay features, characters, Pokémon, and Pokémon forms, including new forms of the legendary Pokémon Necrozma as version mascots.

The games received generally positive reception, with critics praising the additional features included over Sun and Moon, although some criticized it for being too similar for a majority of the story. As of March 31, 2025, a combined total of 9.26 million units have been sold worldwide, ranking them as the ninth-best-selling Nintendo 3DS titles of all time.

== Gameplay ==
Similar to previous games in the series, Pokémon Ultra Sun and Ultra Moon are role-playing video games with adventure elements. While set in an alternate version of the Alola Region, the mechanics and graphics remain largely the same as Pokémon Sun and Moon, with the primary differences being its modified storyline now including the Ultra Recon Squad. The player character designs are also different, though they remain customisable. "Global Missions", where players across the world work towards a collective goal, also make a return.

=== New features ===
Ultra Sun and Ultra Moon introduce some new Ultra Beasts: Stakataka, Blacephalon, (Note: Stakataka only appears in Ultra Moon while Blacephalon only appears in Ultra Sun.) Poipole and its evolution, Naganadel. In addition, there are new forms for the legendary Pokémon Necrozma, dubbed "Dusk Mane" and "Dawn Wings" forms, which are achieved by absorbing the legendary Pokémon Solgaleo and Lunala, respectively; it is conceptually similar to Black and White Kyurem from Black 2 and White 2. Also, a new Lycanroc form was added, Dusk Lycanroc. Players can now travel around the Alola region to collect Totem Stickers, which allow the player to receive a Totem-sized variant of a Pokémon. Three new activities have been added: Mantine Surf, which allows the player to surf across the region's seas—it also serves as an alternate way of earning Battle Points; Alola Photo Club, which allows players to take pictures of their player character with Pokémon in various poses; and Ultra Warp Ride, which allows the player to travel through varying Ultra Wormholes and encounter the original seven Ultra Beasts in their own worlds—in addition to finding legendary Pokémon from every game in the series up to that point, up to three times, and an increased chance for shiny Pokémon to appear. New Z-Moves are available for multiple Pokémon, including Solgaleo, Lunala, Lycanroc, Mimikyu and Necrozma. An upgrade to the Rotom Pokédex adds Roto-Loto, which allows the player to use boosts, akin to O-Powers from the previous generation; and Z-Rotom Power, which allows players to use up to two Z-Moves per battle.

== Plot ==
=== Setting ===
The games put an emphasis on the Legendary Pokémon Necrozma which, in these versions, takes Lusamine's place as the primary antagonist of the games. As with Sun and Moon, the games are set in the Alola Region which is based on Hawaii. Although largely the same, the new games feature additional buildings and locations in comparison to the first installments. Multiple main characters featured in Sun and Moon, such as Lusamine and her children, return in the game with significant changes. A new group, the Ultra Recon Squad, is introduced with differing characters in the two games. Ultra Megalopolis, a vast city where Necrozma has robbed all of its light sources, is located within Ultra Space and is accessible through the Ultra Wormholes.

Another antagonist group, Team Rainbow Rocket, is featured in a post-game story and includes all of the previous antagonist group bosses featured throughout the series, ranging from Giovanni from Pokémon Red, Blue and Yellow to Lysandre from Pokémon X and Y. Legendary Pokémon from previous generations are also included.

=== Story ===
Similar to Sun and Moon, the player character is Elio or Selene, who is moving from Kanto Region to Melemele Island in the Alola Region with their mother. As is tradition, the player has rivals on their journey: Hau, a friendly boy who accompanies the player throughout the story, and Gladion, Lusamine's estranged son and Lillie's older brother. During their travels in Alola following the region's traditional island challenges, they complete trials which involve battles with powerful Pokémon known as Totem Pokémon, and encounter numerous groups—a villainous one known as Team Skull, led by Guzma; a more charitable one known as the Aether Foundation, led by Lusamine; and another called the Ultra Recon Squad, who came from a different dimension, the Ultra Megalopolis, where Necrozma has stolen its light. Much of the story revolves around multiple Legendary Pokémon: a Cosmog, nicknamed Nebby, who eventually evolves into a Solgaleo in Ultra Sun, or Lunala in Ultra Moon; and Necrozma, who attempts to seize the light from Alola.

During the climax, Lusamine uses Nebby to create a wormhole to the Ultra Megalopolis, where she and Guzma attempt to fight Necrozma for the sake of the Ultra Recon Squad. However, they fail and are thrown back into their dimension later on in the story, with Necrozma following them. Necrozma fights Nebby, now a Solgaleo or Lunala, and prevails. Necrozma then absorbs the Legendary Pokémon, gaining its Dusk Mane or Dawn Wings form in the respective version, and unleashes the Ultra Beasts upon Alola before fighting the player. After the player defeats it, Necrozma escapes into the Ultra Megalopolis, taking the world's light with it while the player, with the help of the Ultra Recon Squad, travels on the opposite Legendary featured in each game—Lunala in Ultra Sun or Solgaleo in Ultra Moon—through Ultra Space to reach the Ultra Megalopolis. There, the player battles Necrozma, this time in its true form as Ultra Necrozma, for the fate of the world and to rescue Nebby. The player defeats it once and for all, bringing light back to Alola. After completing these trials, the player proceeds to battle a newly established Elite Four and later defeats Hau to become the first-ever Alola League Champion.

In the post-game, the player encounters Team Rainbow Rocket, a dimensionally displaced group based on Team Rocket from Red, Blue and Yellow. The aforementioned group seizes control of the Aether Foundation's headquarters and takes Lusamine hostage. The player stages a counterattack alongside a reformed Guzma, Lillie, and former Team Plasma boss Colress. Battling through villainous team bosses from the past games—Maxie and Archie from Ruby, Sapphire, and Emerald; Cyrus from Diamond, Pearl, and Platinum, Ghetsis from Black, White, Black 2, and White 2 and Lysandre from X and Y—the player finally encounters Giovanni, who leads Team Rainbow Rocket and has a Mewtwo at his disposal. After the player's victory, Giovanni vanishes, wondering "what new world shall [he] unleash [his] evil schemes upon". The player can then explore the Ultra Wormholes, the worlds of the Ultra Beasts, and catch them with the Beast Balls they have acquired. After catching Necrozma at Mount Lanakila, Colress will appear and give the player the N-Solarizer or N-Lunarizer, allowing Necrozma to fuse or separate from Solgaleo or Lunala respectively. Once the player has caught the Ultra Beasts, the Ultra Recon Squad will tell them to defeat or catch Blacephalon in Ultra Sun or Stakataka in Ultra Moon.

== Development ==
Shigeru Ohmori, one of the game's producers, stated that Ultra Sun and Ultra Moon were worked on by younger staff members while veterans worked on the upcoming Pokémon games for the Nintendo Switch, although some more experienced members, such as Shigeki Morimoto were assigned to it. He also stated that Game Freak was treating Ultra Sun and Ultra Moon as the "culmination of our work with the 3DS system". The development team of 80 was approximately half that of Pokémon Sun and Moon despite Ultra Sun and Ultra Moon having a script twice as long as Sun and Moon. In a separate interview, Ohmori also described an idea to develop the Ultra installments formed late during the development of Sun and Moon, with the titles intended to take advantage of the momentum gained by the Pokémon series following the massively successful release of the mobile game Pokémon Go. Game director Kazumasa Iwao was previously in charge of the battle systems in Sun and Moon.

In the post-game, the games include a tribute to former Nintendo CEO Satoru Iwata, mentioning his role in the development of Pokémon Gold and Silver. The games received their first patch in December 2017, fixing several bugs.

== Promotion and release ==
Ultra Sun and Ultra Moon were revealed in a Pokémon Direct on 6 June 2017. Initial clerical errors in the Pokémon website showed that the games' release date for the Nintendo Switch were "TBA", although The Pokémon Company later clarified that the games were exclusive to the Nintendo 3DS.

Similar to its predecessor, the game's files were leaked on to the Internet before their official release, allowing software pirates to play the full game and data miners to find previously unannounced information including a new form for Necrozma, a new Ultra Beast, a new mythical Pokémon and more.

Less than a week before the game's release, the mobile game Pokémon Go released an update which enabled its players to customize their in-game avatars in the style of player characters from Ultra Sun and Ultra Moon, marking the first time the app had been used to promote a main series game.

== Reception ==
Prior to the release, both games were among the most highly anticipated titles for the Nintendo 3DS in 2017, according to Nielsen.

=== Critical reception ===
Reception

Aggregate scores
Aggregator	Score
Metacritic	84/100
OpenCritic	87% recommend

Review scores
Publication	Score
Destructoid	9/10
Famitsu	36/40
Game Informer	8.5/10
GameSpot	8/10
IGN	9/10
Nintendo Life	10/10
Nintendo World Report	8/10

Ultra Sun and Ultra Moon received "generally favorable" reviews according to review aggregator Metacritic. Fellow review aggregator OpenCritic assessed that the games received strong approval, being recommended by 87% of critics. Casey Defreitas in her review for IGN remarked that the games were "full of smart improvements". Other reviewers made similar points, with Kallie Plagge at GameSpot noting that despite similarities with Sun and Moon, "Ultra Sun and Ultra Moon make enough changes to stand apart as the definitive version of the seventh generation games". On the other hand, Allegra Frank of Polygon criticized that the aforementioned changes were only present at the end, with the bulk of the gameplay being the same as its predecessor.

=== Sales ===
Following release, the two games sold 1.2 million physical copies—excluding digital copies purchased from the Nintendo eShop—within the first three days on sale in Japan. By the end of the year, the two games had sold over 2 million copies in Japan alone, making it the best-selling video game in the country for 2017. Sales from Ultra Sun and Ultra Moon pushed the cumulative sales of the franchise to exceed the 300 million copies sold milestone. According to Amazon, Ultra Sun and Ultra Moon were their seventh-best selling video games in 2017—however, they drop to 25th for Ultra Sun and 28th for Ultra Moon if other video game-related products and console variations are accounted for. As of March 31, 2025, a combined total of 9.26 million units have been sold worldwide, ranking them as the ninth-best-selling Nintendo 3DS titles of all time.

=== Awards ===
The games were nominated for "People's Choice" at the Italian Video Game Awards, and won the "Excellence Prize" at the Famitsu Awards.
