= Pokémon the Series: XYZ =

Nineteenth season of the Pokémon animated television series

- Season 19
- Pokémon the Series: XYZ logo
- No. of episodes: 47 + 2 specials (Japanese version); 48 (English version)

Release
- Original network: TV Tokyo
- Original release: October 29, 2015 – October 27, 2016

Season chronology
- ← Previous; XY: Kalos Quest Next → Sun & Moon

Pokémon the Series: XYZ, known in Japan as Pocket Monsters: XY&Z (ポケットモンスター エックスワイゼット, Poketto Monsutā Ekkusu Wai Zetto), is the nineteenth season of the Pokémon anime series and the third and final season of Pokémon the Series: XY, known in Japan as Pocket Monsters: XY (ポケットモンスター エックス・ワイ, Poketto Monsutā Ekkusu Wai).

The season follows Ash Ketchum as he continues travelling across the Kalos region with Serena, Clemont, and Bonnie.

The season originally aired in Japan from October 29, 2015, to October 27, 2016, on TV Tokyo, and in the United States from February 20, 2016, to January 28, 2017, on Cartoon Network.

== Episode list ==
Jap. overall (Note: The English episode numbers are based on their first airing in the United States in syndication on Cartoon Network. Other English-speaking nations largely follow either this order or the Japanese order.)	Eng. overall	No. in season	English title Japanese title	Original release date	English air date
895	889	1	"From A to Z!" (Z's Explosive Birth! What Lurks in Kalos!!); Transliteration: "Z Bakutan! Karosu ni Hisomu Mono!!" (Japanese: Z爆誕！カロスに潜む者！！)	October 29, 2015	February 20, 2016
While traveling through the woods, Ash and his friends come upon an unknown Pokémon in Bonnie's bag that seems to be a very serious target when a mysterious team appears in hopes to catch it. The gang decide to protect it and try to find out why it is so important to the unknown team.
896	890	2	"Love Strikes! Eevee, Yikes!" (The Hot-blooded Hariborg! Puni-chan is Being Targeted!!); Transliteration: "Nekketsu Haribōgu! Nerawareta Puni-chan!!" (Japanese: 熱血ハリボーグ！狙われたプニちゃん！！)	November 5, 2015	February 27, 2016
As the gang continue their travels with their new Pokémon friend, nicknamed "Squishy", a Quilladin appears and falls head over heels for Eevee. Meanwhile, Team Rocket set their sights on capturing Squishy.
897	891	3	"A Giga Battle With Mega Results!" (Mega Tabunne VS Giga Giga Nyarth!!); Transliteration: "Mega Tabunne VS Giga Giga Nyāsu!!" (Japanese: メガタブンネVSギガギガニャース！！)	November 12, 2015	March 5, 2016
Ash and his friends run across Nurse Joy, who is stuck in a crevice. When they help her, they discover that Nurse Joy and her Audino do not always get along. Nurse Joy hopes the Mega Stone she found will help create a deeper bond between the two.
898	892	4	"A Fiery Rite of Passage!" (Shishiko and Kaenjishi! A Fiery Departure!!); Transliteration: "Shishiko to Kaenjishi! Honō no tabidachi!!" (Japanese: シシコとカエンジシ！炎の旅立ち！！)	November 19, 2015	March 12, 2016
The gang come across a Litleo arguing with a Pyroar. When they learn it is time for Litleo to become independent, they decide to watch it from afar. However, Team Rocket has other plans.
899	893	5	"Dream a Little Dream from Me!" (Pikachu, the Dreams Seen of Puni-chan!); Transliteration: "Pikachu, Puni-chan no yume o miru!" (Japanese: ピカチュウ、プニちゃんの夢を見る！)	November 26, 2015	March 19, 2016
As the heroes and Team Rocket go to sleep, Darkrai appears and casts dream spells on them. This places Pikachu and Meowth in Squishy's dreams. The two begin to see the past and future of Squishy as well as the gang's Pokémon.
900	894	6	"The Legend of the Ninja Hero!" (Welcome to the Ninja Village! The Legend of the Heroic Gekkouga!!); Transliteration: "Yōkoso ninja-mura e! Eiyū Gekkouga no densetsu!!" (Japanese: ようこそ忍者村へ！英雄ゲッコウガの伝説！！)	December 3, 2015	March 26, 2016
The gang meet up with their ninja friend Sanpei, who invites them to his village for a festival. However, they soon get interrupted when a Ninja Army attacks and kidnaps the village's chieftain.
901	895	7	"A Festival of Decisions!" (Decisive Battle in the Ninja Village! Gekogashira VS Kirikizan!!); Transliteration: "Ninja-mura kessen! Gekogashira tai Kirikizan!!" (Japanese: 忍者村決戦！ゲコガシラ対キリキザン！！)	December 10, 2015	April 2, 2016
As the gang fight off the evil ninjas to rescue chieftain Hanzo, help soon appears when Ash's Frogadier evolves into Greninja and acquires a mysterious power transformation connected to its bond with Ash.
902	896	8	"A Dancing Debut!" (Dance, Eievui! Its TryPokaron Debut!!); Transliteration: "Odore Ībui! ToraiPokaron Debyū!!" (Japanese: 踊れイーブイ！トライポカロン･デビュー！！)	December 17, 2015	April 9, 2016
Serena gets ready for her next Pokémon Showcase performance, hoping to get her third and final Princess Key along with her Eevee. Unfortunately, a slight flub edges them out, and Jessie from Team Rocket now has her first Princess Key in her hands.
903	897	9	"Meeting at Terminus Cave!" (Terminus Cave! The Mystery of Z is Set in Motion!!); Transliteration: "Tsui no Dōkutsu! Ugokidashita Z no Nazo!!" (Japanese: ついの洞窟！動き出したZの謎！！)	December 24, 2015	April 16, 2016
Ash and the gang arrive at Terminus Cave, but Team Flare appears and attacks the gang in an attempt to retrieve the Zygarde Core.
904	898	10	"A Cellular Connection!" (Eureka and Puni-chan!); Transliteration: "Yurīka to Puni-chan!" (Japanese: ユリーカとプニちゃん！)	January 14, 2016	April 23, 2016
Squishy has disappeared off following the battle in Terminus Cave against Team Flare, causing Bonnie immense worry. Ash and the gang cheer her up by searching for it.
905	899	11	"A Windswept Encounter!" (Onbat and Flaette! An Encounter in the Wind!!); Transliteration: "Onbatto to Furaette! Kaze no naka no meguriai!!" (Japanese: オンバットとフラエッテ！風の中のめぐりあい！！)	January 21, 2016	April 30, 2016
Noibat meets a Breloom and accidentally messes with its flowers, which causes Breloom to be mad at Noibat. Noibat also meets a Floette, which it becomes friends with quickly. However, because the Breloom is in love with the Floette, it becomes angrier at Noibat, leading to a skirmish.
906	900	12	"Party Dancecapades!" (Satoshi and Serena! Get One at the Dance Party!!); Transliteration: "Satoshi to Serena! Dansu pāti de getto da ze!!" (Japanese: サトシとセレナ！ダンスパーティでゲットだぜ！！)	January 28, 2016	May 7, 2016
Serena, Ash, Bonnie, and Clemont go to a dance party, where they meet up with Kalos Queen Aria and Miette for a magical ball. During the festivities, Ash and Serena are paired up for a tag battle against Miette and James, during which Serena's Eevee evolves into Sylveon.
907	901	13	"A Meeting of Two Journeys!" (The Strongest Mega Battle! Gekkouga VS Mega Lizardon!!); Transliteration: "Saikyō mega batoru! Gekkouga VS Mega Rizādon!!" (Japanese: 最強メガバトル！ゲッコウガVSメガリザードン！！)	February 4, 2016	May 14, 2016
Ash battles against Sawyer again, during which Greninja undergoes its mysterious power transformation. Witnessing Ash's Greninja's unique power, the Pokémon Mega Evolution Trainer Alain, still on his journey to gather Mega Evolution energy, challenges Ash to a battle. During the battle against Alain's Mega Charizard X, Ash realizes a connection with Greninja.
908	902	14	"An Explosive Operation!" (The Explosive Ground Force! Operation: Capture Zygarde!!); Transliteration: "Bakuretsu Gurando Fōsu! Jigarude hokaku sakusen!!" (Japanese: 爆裂グランドフォース！ジガルデ捕獲作戦！！)	February 11, 2016	May 21, 2016
Team Flare chase another Zygarde Core, codenamed "Z2" by them. However, Team Rocket is also pursuing the other Zygarde Core, leading to a fight between the two teams. Eventually, Team Flare captures the other Zygarde Core after receiving assistance from Alain and his Mega Charizard X.
909	903	15	"A Watershed Moment!" (A Brigarron from the Wilderness! The Tree-Planting Robon!!); Transliteration: "Kōya no Burigaron! Ki wo ueru Robon!!" (Japanese: 荒野のブリガロン！木を植えるロボン！！)	February 18, 2016	May 28, 2016
While traveling in the wilderness of a valley, the gang are confronted by a boy named Henny and a Chesnaught, who are trying to restore the forest that used to cover the area.
910	904	16	"Master Class Choices!" (The Master Class Trial! What Will You Do, Serena!?); Transliteration: "Masutā Kurasu e no shiren! Dō suru Serena!?" (Japanese: マスタークラスへの試練！どうするセレナ！？)	February 25, 2016	June 4, 2016
Serena gets ready for her next Pokémon Showcase, hoping to win her third and final Princess Key required for the Master Class. However, a new Performer with a very snooty attitude and influential supporters named Amelia appears and may prove to be the greatest test of Serena's performance skills. Meanwhile, Palermo watches Serena in the Pokémon Showcase. After the votes are tallied, Serena wins her final Princess Key and qualifies for the Master Class. Upset with the outcome, Amelia tries to complain to Palermo that her performance was better than Serena's, but Palermo harshly reminds Amelia that complaining about the results is not going to benefit her and that Amelia must find ways to improve her skills. Meanwhile, Serena is told by Palermo that she does not have the skills necessary to take the title of Kalos Queen from Aria.
911	905	17	"An Electrifying Rage!" (Thunder and Onvern! The Angry Lightning Strike!!); Transliteration: "Sandā to Onbān! Ikari no raigeki!!" (Japanese: サンダーとオンバーン！怒りの雷撃！！)	March 3, 2016	June 11, 2016
The gang travels to the mountains, where an encounter with the Legendary Pokémon Zapdos led to Noibat evolving into Noivern in order to prove himself by saving Hawlucha from Zapdos.
912	906	18	"Unlocking Some Respect!" (Left and Right! The Swaying Heart of Kametete!!); Transliteration: "Refuto to Raito! Yureru kokoro no Kametete!!" (Japanese: レフトとライト！揺れる心のカメテテ！！)	March 10, 2016	June 18, 2016
The gang come across a locksmith and a thief who share the same Pokémon known as Binacle.
913	907	19	"Master Class is in Session!" (The Master Class Begins! A Maiden's Fierce Fight Where Sparks Fly!!); Transliteration: "Masutā Kurasu kaimaku! Hibana chiru otome no gekitō!!" (Japanese: マスタークラス開幕！火花散る乙女の激闘！！)	March 17, 2016	June 25, 2016
Serena and her Pokémon are ready to perform in the Master Class for first place. Facing tough competition from her rivals Miette, Shauna, Jessie, and Nini, Serena steadily advances through the first and second rounds, reaching the semi-finals to face Shauna and Jessie for the chance to face Aria one-on-one for the title of Kalos Queen.
914	908	20	"Performing a Pathway to the Future!" (Elle VS Serena! Open the Door to the Future!!); Transliteration: "Eru VS Serena! Ake mirai e no tobira!!" (Japanese: エルVSセレナ！開け未来への扉！！)	March 24, 2016	July 2, 2016
After narrowly defeating Shauna and Jessie in the Master Class Semifinals, Serena goes up against Kalos Queen Aria one-on-one in the finals, but is unfortunately defeated. During the performance, Serena finally realizes that skill necessary to be the Kalos Queen she lacks in comparison to Aria.
915	909	21	"A Keeper for Keeps?!" (A Bride for Citron!? Eureka's S'il-vous-plaît Panic!!); Transliteration: "Shitoron no hanayome!? Yurīka no Shiru-bu-pure panikku!!" (Japanese: シトロンの花嫁！？ユリーカのシルブプレパニック！！)	April 7, 2016	July 9, 2016
A new friend who gets along well with Clemont makes Bonnie feeling left out and jealous.
916	910	22	"Battling at Full Volume!" (Serena Becomes Satoshi! The Ultimate Pikachu Showdown!!); Transliteration: "Serena, Satoshi ni naru! Saikyō Pikachū taiketsu!!" (Japanese: セレナ、サトシになる！最強ピカチュウ対決！！)	April 14, 2016	July 16, 2016
Ash comes down with a fever by the lake water after training with Pikachu and Greninja, so Serena decides to stand in for him when a guitarist named Jimmy challenges Ash to a Pikachu vs. Pikachu battle.
917	911	23	"The Synchronicity Test!" (Satoshi and Alan! Gekkouga VS Mega Lizardon Once Again!!); Transliteration: "Satoshi to Aran! Gekkouga VS Mega Rizādon futatabi!!" (Japanese: サトシとアラン！ゲッコウガVSメガリザードンふたたび！！)	April 21, 2016	July 23, 2016
Determined to unravel the mysteries behind Greninja's unique power connection with Ash, Clemont begins a scientific experiment. As this goes on, Alain stops by, eager to battle Ash and Greninja once again. After a battle between Ash's Noivern and Alain's Metang, Ash-Greninja and Mega Charizard X have a rematch. Just when Ash gains the upper hand, something shocking happens to him.
918	912	24	"Making Friends and Influencing Villains!" (The Forest's Curse and the White Bokurei!); Transliteration: "Mori no noroi to shiroi Bokurē!" (Japanese: 森の呪いと白いボクレー！)	April 28, 2016	July 30, 2016
Ash and his friends help an alternately colored Phantump find its way back home after Team Rocket had separated it from its fellow kind.
919	913	25	"Championing a Research Battle!" (Satoshi VS Champion Carnet! VS Mega Sirnight!!); Transliteration: "Satoshi tai chanpion Karune! VS Mega Sānaito!!" (Japanese: サトシ対チャンピオン・カルネ！VSメガサーナイト！！)	May 5, 2016	August 6, 2016
Kalos League Champion Diantha visits Ash and his friends in order to discuss the prophecy foretold by Anistar City Gym Leader Olympia. Learning about Greninja's unique power with Ash, Diantha and Mega Gardevoir engage in battle against Ash and Ash-Greninja. As the battle progresses, Ash and Ash-Greninja reaches his power transformation to max level, pushing Diantha and Mega Gardevoir to the brink of defeat. Ash and Ash-Greninja pass out once again before the battle can be decided due to the effects of their full synchronization.
920	914	26	"A Full Strength Battle Surprise!" (Rival Showdown! Satoshi VS Shōta!!); Transliteration: "Raibaru taiketsu! Satoshi VS Shōta!!" (Japanese: ライバル対決！サトシVSショータ！！)	May 12, 2016	August 13, 2016
After meeting up with Sawyer once again, Ash engages in a 3-on-3 battle with his rival, who has earned all eight Kalos Gym Badges required for the Kalos League. However, when Greninja battles Sawyer's Sceptile, Greninja proves unable to transform, leading to a first victory for Sawyer.
921	915	27	"All Hail the Ice Battlefield!" (Eisetsu Gym Battle! Battlefield of Ice!!); Transliteration: "Eisetsu Jimu Sen! Kōri no batorufīrudo!!" (Japanese: エイセツジム戦！氷のバトルフィールド！！)	May 19, 2016	August 20, 2016
Ash battles against Gym Leader Wulfric of the Snowbelle City, using Hawlucha, Talonflame, and Greninja to combat Wulfric's Ice-types. However, needing only Abomasnow and Avalugg, Wulfric hands Ash a disastrous defeat, who heads off into the forest by himself to answer the doubts in his heart, The following morning, Serena becomes worried about Ash's lack of return not even Clemont's encouragment giving her relief.
922	916	28	"Seeing the Forest For the Trees!" (The Winding Woods...The Dawn of Evolution!!); Transliteration: "Mayoi no Mori...Shinka no Yoake!!" (Japanese: 迷いの森・・・進化の夜明け！)	May 26, 2016	August 27, 2016
Following his disastrous defeat against Wulfric, Ash reflects on his recent past failures and shortcomings alone in the forest. Serena becomes worried about Ash's lack of return and leaves to search for him. A short time later, Serena finds Ash and tries to comfort him but Ash reprimands Serena and angrily demands her to leave him alone. Repulsed by the change in Ash's personality, Serena throws three snowballs at Ash and tells him that she isn't acting like the Ash she knows, straining their friendship. Later, as his friends search for him amidst a fearsome blizzard, Serena begins to regret being so hard on Ash earlier, an encounter with a certain Pokémon reignites Ash's passion, not only allowing him and Greninja to master their unique power, but also enabling Ash to reaffirm his desire to become a Pokémon Master, Ash and Serena reconcile and the group heads to the Snowbelle Gym so Ash can obtain his eight and final Kalos Gym Badge.
923	917	29	"A Real Icebreaker!" (Satoshi-Gekkouga VS Mega Yukinooh! The Giant Water Shuriken Triggers!!); Transliteration: "Satoshi-Gekkouga VS Mega Yukinō'o!! Hatsudō kyodai mizu shuriken!!" (Japanese: サトシゲッコウガVSメガユキノオー！発動巨大水手裏剣！！)	June 2, 2016	September 3, 2016
Ash issues a rematch battle against Wulfric to obtain his eighth and final Kalos Gym Badge. Facing a big challenge in the form of Wulfric's Mega Abomasnow, Ash fights with renewed determination and passion. With the help of Ash-Greninja, Ash defeats Wulfric and receives his final Kalos Gym Badge to enter the Kalos League.
924	918	30	"A Diamond in the Rough!" (Find Melecie! Numelgon and Dedenne!!); Transliteration: "Find Melecie! Numelgon and Dedenne!!" (Japanese: メレシーを探せ！ヌメルゴンとデデンネ！！)	June 9, 2016	September 10, 2016
As Ash and his friends continue their journey to the Kalos League Conference held in Lumiose City, they arrive at the Wetlands to see Goodra. However, a Carbink goes on a rampage and sparks a search. Meanwhile, Alain battles against Korrina to obtain his eighth and final Kalos Gym Badge.
925	919	31	"A Gaggle of Gadget Greatness!" (The Explosive Heat at the Mechanical Festival!!); Transliteration: "The Explosive Heat at the Mechanical Festival!!" (Japanese: 爆熱の機巧（からくり）フェスティバル！！)	June 16, 2016	September 17, 2016
Ash and his friends arrive at the Gadget Festival, where many inventions are on display. Clemont is very excited to explore the various gadgets, but trouble arises when Team Rocket starts stealing people's Poké Balls.
926	920	32	"A League of His Own!" (The Kalos League Begins! The Mega Lizardon Showdown: X VS Y!!); Transliteration: "The Kalos League Begins! The Mega Lizardon Showdown: X VS Y!!" (Japanese: カロスリーグ開幕！メガリザードン対決・X対Y！！)	June 30, 2016	September 24, 2016
The Kalos League Lumiose Conference finally begins. Ash, Sawyer, Tierno, Trevor, and Alain are all competing in the conference, with Alain's old opponents from Mega Evolution Act I, Astrid and Remo, entering as well. The first match is between Alain and Trevor, which sparks a Mega Charizard Battle between X and Y. As Ash heads to his match, a Trainer suddenly challenges him to a battle, making to Ash be about to almost disqualified from the match.
927	921	33	"Valuable Experience for All!" (Mega Jukain VS Raichu! Received Some Experience Points!!); Transliteration: "Mega Jukain VS Raichu! Received Some Experience Points!!" (Japanese: メガジュカイン対ライチュウ！経験値いただきます！！)	July 7, 2016	October 1, 2016
Ash defeats Astrid in the Lumiose Conference Quarterfinals and advances onto the semi-finals alongside Alain and Remo. Meanwhile, the Lumiose Conference Quarterfinal battle between Sawyer and Tierno begins, with Sawyer emerging victorious thanks to his newly acquired ability to Mega Evolve his Sceptile. The semi-final battles are revealed to be between Alain and Remo and Ash and Sawyer, with Ash calling upon Goodra to act as his sixth Pokémon for the Full Battle. It also does reveal that Ash originally wanted to use one of his reserves for his battle against Sawyer, before deciding to use Goodra as his sixth Pokémon.
928	922	34	"Analysis Versus Passion!" (The Semifinal Full Battle! Satoshi Vs Shota!!); Transliteration: "The Semifinal Full Battle! Satoshi VS Shota!!" (Japanese: 準決勝フルバトル！サトシ対ショータ！！)	July 21, 2016	October 8, 2016
Following Alain's victory over Remo in the first semi-final match, Ash and Sawyer's long awaited battle in the second semi-final match begins in a forest battlefield, with Ash's Hawlucha losing to Sawyer's Slaking and Ash's Talonflame avenging the loss, but losing to Sawyer's Clawitzer. Pikachu defeats Clawitzer, but now faces Aegislash.
929	923	35	"A Riveting Rivalry!" (Decisive Rival Battle! Satoshi-Gekkouga Vs Mega Jukain!!); Transliteration: "Decisive Rival Battle! Satoshi-Gekkouga VS Mega Jukain!!" (Japanese: ライバル決戦！サトシゲッコウガVSメガジュカイン！！)	July 28, 2016	October 15, 2016
Pikachu out-maneuvers and defeats Aegislash after an intense fight. The battlefield changes to a rock field, with Ash substituting Noivern in to face Sawyer's newly evolved Salamence, but both knock each other out. Sawyer's Slurpuff faces Ash's Goodra, but it's another double knock-out. Pikachu loses to Sceptile, but Ash-Greninja wins against Mega Sceptile with its Giant Water Shuriken. Having defeated Sawyer, Ash moves on to the final match against Alain.
930	924	36	"Kalos League Passion with a Certain Flare!" (Fierce Fighting at the Kalos League! Gather, All of My Passion!!); Transliteration: "Fierce Fighting at the Kalos League! Gather, All of My Passion!!" (Japanese: 激闘カロスリーグ！集え、すべての熱き想いよ！！)	August 4, 2016	October 22, 2016
While Ash prepares for his final match against Alain in the Lumiose Conference, he meets Team Flare's boss Lysandre, who has become interested in him and Greninja. Meanwhile, Clemont's Chespin gets lost and meets Mairin, Alain's former traveling partner, leading the group to learn about the condition of her ill partner Chespie. As this occurs, Professor Sycamore finally reveals that the strange power transformation that Ash's Greninja possess is known as the Bond phenomenon.
931	925	37	"Finals Not for the Faint-Hearted!" (Kalos League Finale! Satoshi vs Alan!!); Transliteration: "Kalos League Finale! Satoshi vs Alan!!" (Japanese: 決勝戦！サトシ対アラン！！)	August 11, 2016	October 29, 2016
The final match between Ash and Alain in the Lumiose Conference begins. With neither trainer unable to maintain the advantage over the other, nerves run high. The two seem evenly matched, trading one knockout after another: Pikachu beats Tyranitar and then switches out for Noivern, who falls to Alain's Weavile. Hawlucha defeats Weavile, then loses to Alain's Bisharp. Next, Ash's Talonflame and Alain's Unfezant knock each other out after a spectacular aerial battle and it's tied at three and three! Pikachu returns to face Metagross, and manages to win. Ash gains the lead 3-2, Alain finally brings out Charizard to face off against Pikachu.
932	926	38	"Down to the Fiery Finish!" (Kalos League Victory! Satoshi's Greatest Decisive Battle!!); Transliteration: "Kalos League Victory! Satoshi's Greatest Decisive Battle!!" (Japanese: カロスリーグ優勝！サトシ頂上決戦！！)	August 18, 2016	November 5, 2016
The final match in the Lumiose Conference between Ash and Alain continues. Charizard defeats an exhausted Pikachu. Next, Alain's Bisharp defeats Goodra and falls to Greninja. it all comes down to Ash-Greninja and Mega Charizard X, after the final clash between Ash-Greninja's Massive Water Fuma Shuriken and Mega Charizard X's Blast Burn, Ash-Greninja is defeated and Alain becomes Lumiose Conference Champion. Meanwhile, Team Flare prepares to move forward with their plans to unleash a mind-controlled Z-2 in Lumiose City.
933	927	39	"A Towering Takeover!" (Flare Gang Attack! The Zygarde at the Prism Tower!!); Transliteration: "Shōgeki Furea-dan! Purizumu tawā no Jigarude!!" (Japanese: 襲撃フレア団！プリズムタワーのジガルデ！！)	August 25, 2016	November 12, 2016
Chaos erupts as Team Flare attacks Lumiose City with Z-2, who causes mass destruction while in its 50% Form. With Alain's ties to Team Flare revealed to Ash, he is forced to let Team Flare take Ash and his Pokémon captive through Lysandre orders but instantly regrets what he has done. Lysandre plans to use Ash and his Greninja's Bond phenomenon for his plans while using their friends, Ash other Pokémon, as hostages. When Alain went to go confront Lysandre about this he finds out what Team Flare's plans truly are, shocking him. Meanwhile, Squishy transforms into the 50% Form to battle Z-2, revealing its true identity as Zygarde to the group.
934	928	40	"Coming Apart at the Dreams!" (The Shocking Zygarde VS Zygarde! The Collapsing World!!); Transliteration: "Shōgeki Jigarude tai Jigarude! Kowareyuku sekai!!" (Japanese: 衝撃ジガルデ対ジガルデ！壊れゆく世界！！)	September 1, 2016	November 19, 2016
Z-1 battles against Z-2 to try and snap it out of Team Flare's control, but is put under the same control as Z-2. Clemont, Clembot and Blaziken Mask battle against Team Flare's Bryony and Aliana to gain access to Prism Tower, as Bonnie tries to find a way to help Z-1. Serena, Sycamore, Mairin and a disguised Team Rocket go to rescue Chespie from Lysandre Labs. Lysandre attempted to control Ash and Greninja for their Bond phenomenon with their friends watching in shocked, Ash's other Pokémon. But they fought back as Lysandre not only underestimates Ash and Greninja bond for each other but he also underestimates the bond they have for their friends. After breaking free from captivity Ash, Ash-Greninja, Pikachu and his Pokémon team up with a now-remorseful Alain and Mega Charizard X, after Ash talk some sense into him to battle Team Flare's boss Lysandre.
935	929	41	"The Right Hero for the Right Job!" (Attack on Miare Gym! Citroid Forever!!); Transliteration: "Totsugeki Miare Jimu! Shitoroido yo ēen ni!!" (Japanese: 突撃ミアレジム！シトロイドよ永遠に！！)	September 8, 2016	December 3, 2016
Ash and Alain continue their battle against Lysandre, but one-by-one Ash's Pokémon are overpowered by Lysandre's Mega Gyarados, leaving only Ash-Greninja and Pikachu remainings. On the brink of defeat, the two get help from former Team Flare member and current Kalos Elite Four member Malva. Clemont and Clembot are able to get into the Lumiose Gym to destroy Team Flare's control machine. Clemont and Clembot are able to do so, sacrificing Clembot in the process. Serena, Professor Sycamore, and Mairin infiltrate Lysandre Labs to rescue Chespie while Hoenn League Champion Steven and Team Rocket distract Team Flare's Mable and Celosia. Bonnie is able to reach through to Z-1 with her lullaby, freeing Z-1 from control, while the destruction of Team Flare's machine control frees Z-2 too.
936	930	42	"Rocking Kalos Defenses!" (The Megalith Moves Forward! The Kalos Line of Defense!!); Transliteration: "Shingeki-suru kyoseki! Karosu bōēsen!!" (Japanese: 進撃する巨石！カロス防衛線！！)	September 15, 2016	December 10, 2016
Ash and Alain with Malva's help continue their battle against Lysandre, succeeding in defeating Mega Gyarados. Meanwhile, Chespie is absorbed by the Megalith Crystal in Lysandre's lab, which transforms into a giant Megalith Zygarde. The Megalith Zygarde heads toward Anistar City to absorb the power from the Anistar Sundial, which will result in a planetary apocalypse. Ash, Clemont, Alain, Professor Sycamore, Blaziken Mask, Malva, Steven, the eight Kalos Gym Leaders and the Kalos League Champion Diantha join forces to save Mairin's Chespie and defeat the Megalith Zygarde.
937	931	43	"Forming a More Perfect Union!" (The Zygarde Counterattack! The Final Decisive Battle of Kalos!!); Transliteration: "Hangeki no Jigarude! Karosu saishō kessen!!" (Japanese: 反撃のジガルデ！カロス最終決戦！！)	September 15, 2016	December 17, 2016
As Clemont, Professor Sycamore, Blaziken Mask, Malva, Steven, Diantha, the eight Kalos Gym Leaders and even Team Rocket attempt to stop the Megalith Zygarde, Ash and Alain break inside and rescue Chespie. However, the Megalith Zygarde is still able to function without Chespie after Lysandre takes direct control over it. With no more other option, Z-1 and Z-2 join forms with every Zygarde Cell in the entire world to transform into Zygarde Complete Forme. The Zygarde Complete Forme is able to destroy the Megalith Zygarde and kills Lysandre. The Zygarde Complete Forme then repairs the damage caused by the battle, as Z-1 shares a tearful goodbye with Bonnie before leaving with Z-2.
938	932	44	"Battling With a Clean Slate!" (Starting from Zero! Citron's Decision!!); Transliteration: "Hajimari wa Zero! Shitoroido no Ketsudan!!" (Japanese: はじまりはゼロ！シトロンの決断！！)	October 6, 2016	December 24, 2016
As Lumiose City repairs the extensive damages caused by Team Flare, Clemont successfully repairs Clembot. However, due to Clembot's memory core being destroyed it has no memory of its past, and consequently it has no experience. Meanwhile, a returning Trainer asks for a rematch with Clembot and wins. Ash decides to return to Kanto to start from scratch once again, after a heart-to-heart talk with Ash, Alain decides to return to work as Sycamore's field assistant, leaving Serena in doubt about their future.
939	933	45	"The First Day of the Rest of Your Life!" (One Last Battle with Satoshi! Serena's Choice!!); Transliteration: "Satoshi to Rasuto Batoru! Serena no Sentaku!!" (Japanese: サトシとラストバトル！セレナの選択！！)	October 13, 2016	January 7, 2017
While Lumiose City continues to be repaired, Serena notices its residents are still shaken up by the recent destruction. She decides to host a Pokémon Showcase in Lumiose City with help from Shauna and even Jessie to cheer everyone up. However, Serena is torn on what to pursue next, causing Ash to lend a helping hand to help her in a battle to make a decision.
940	934	46	"Facing the Needs of the Many!" (Farewell, Satoshi Gekkouga! Xerosicy Strikes Back); Transliteration: "Saraba Satoshi Gekkouga! Xerosicy no gyakushū" (Japanese: さらばサトシゲッコウガ！クセロシキの逆襲)	October 20, 2016	January 14, 2017
Heading back to Lumiose Airport after saying goodbye to Goodra, Ash and the gang encounter a remnant vine from Team Flare's attack. Ash and Greninja notice that the vine is being fueled by some kind of energy in the ground. Having taken it out, Xerosic appears alive and abducts Clemont. Xerosic tries to brainwash Clemont to revive the goals of the now defunct Team Flare, but he fails to do so and ends up arrested by law enforcement. Afterwards, more remnant vines appears and both Zygarde rescues them, with Ash releasing Greninja into the care of Z-1 and Z-2 to help combat the vines and restore order to the Kalos region.
941	935	47	"Till We Compete Again!" (A Zero With No End! Till the Day We Meet Again!!); Transliteration: "Owari naki zero! Mata au hi made!!" (Japanese: 終わりなきゼロ！ また逢う日まで！！)	October 27, 2016	January 21, 2017
After saying farewell to Alain, Mairin and Sycamore, Ash and the gang arrive at Lumiose Airport. From there, Ash will return to Kanto region to start from scratch while Serena will go to Hoenn region to enter Pokémon Contests as Pokémon Coordinator. When the four allow their Pokémon to say goodbye to each other, Dedenne runs off in frustration but Bonnie is able to convince Dedenne to return after expressing her desires for the future to everyone. Serena heads to her flight and gives Ash a kiss on the lips before boarding and saying goodbye, finally revealing to him how she feels about him. With some time left before Ash's return flight to Kanto, he and Clemont have one last Pokémon battle: Pikachu vs. Bunnelby. Ash returns home to Pallet Town, with amazing memories and childhood friend and great new friends from his time in Kalos forever etched into his heart.

=== Special episodes ===
Jap. overall	Eng. overall	No. in season	English title Japanese title	Original release date	English air date
SP–9	SP–5	SP–1	"The Legend of X, Y, and Z!" (XYZ's Legend!); Transliteration: "XYZ no densetsu!" (Japanese: XYZの伝説！)	November 3, 2016	January 28, 2017
Professor Sycamore investigates the origins of the XYZ legend with Alexa about the story of a man named Jan and his love interest named Aila. A prophecy made long ago predicted that Yveltal would appear and drain all life from Kalos. Upon the arrival of Yveltal, Aila becomes fossilized as a statue while defending Jan. Afterwards, Yveltal enters into its long term sleep. Jan searches out Xerneas to restore life to Kalos. Years later, Xerneas reappears and restores life to Kalos. However, Aila is left as a statue. Many years later, Jan can be seen as an old and blind man. Jan discusses how he sleeps in the same spot every night. Jan talks to the Aila statue about how Xerneas and Zygarde made the forest so beautiful. Jan cuts an image of the "Z" symbol for Zygarde with a Zygarde Cell on it. Jan falls asleep for the last time where he says, "I want to be with her. I will sleep a little". Note: This special episode aired as the last episode of season 19 in English dub.
SP–10	—	SP–2	"The Strongest Duo! Citron and Cilan!!"; Transliteration: "Saikyō no futari! Citron to Dent!!" (Japanese: 最強の二人！シトロンとデント！！)	November 10, 2016	—
Eureka and Citron meet Dent while at a fishing competition. Once acquainted, they head towards Prism Tower. Eureka becomes trapped in a malfunctioning automated train thanks to a damaged control unit preventing the automated controls taking commands from the command center. With the help of Dent, Eureka and Dedenne manages to bring the train to a stop. Just as Citron and Dent arrive at the train, a Shibirudon uses Plasma Shower to make the train commence operation again. Eureka is once again taken away before being fished to safety using Dent's fishing rod and Citron's Eipam arm. Dedenne uses its cheeks to discharge excessive electricity from Shibirudon, which had been causing it pain. Shibirudon is taken back outside the metro system and dives into the river. After seeing the tower, Dent bids farewell to the siblings and continues his journey.

== Music ==
The Japanese opening song is "XY&Z" by Satoshi / Ash Ketchum (Rica Matsumoto). The Japanese ending songs are "Puni-chan's Song" (プニちゃんのうた, Puni-chan no Uta) by Eureka / Bonnie (Mariya Ise), "Team Rocket's Team Song" (ロケット団団歌, Roketto-dan dan Uta) by Team Rocket (Musashi / Jessie (Megumi Hayashibara), Kojiro / James (Shin-ichiro Miki), Nyarth / Meowth (Inuka Inuyama) and Sonansu / Wobbuffet (Yūji Ueda)), "DreamDream (Serena Ver.)" (ドリドリ セレナ Ver., DoriDori Serena Ver.) by Serena (Mayuki Makiguchi), "Brilliantly (Clemont ver.)" (キラキラ シトロンver., KiraKira Citron ver.) by Citron / Clemont (Yuki Kaji), "Pikachu's Song" (ピカチュウのうた, Pikachū no Uta) by Pikachu (Ikue Ōtani), "Meowth's Ballad" (ニャースのバラード, Nyāsu no Barādo) by Nyarth / Meowth (Inuko Inuyama), and the English opening song is "Stand Tall" by Ben Dixon and The Sad Truth. Its instrumental version serves as the ending theme.

== Home media releases ==
Viz Media and Warner Home Video have released the series in the United States on two three-disc volume sets that contain 24 episodes each.

The first volume was released on August 29, 2017, and the second was released on February 6, 2018.

The complete season was released on February 11, 2025.
