= Pokémon the Series: XY Kalos Quest =

Eighteenth season of the Pokémon animated series

- Season 18
- Pokémon the Series: XY Kalos Quest logo
- No. of episodes: 45 + 3 specials

Release
- Original network: TV Tokyo
- Original release: November 6, 2014 – October 22, 2015

Season chronology
- ← Previous; XY Next → XYZ

Pokémon the Series: XY Kalos Quest is the eighteenth season of the Pokémon anime series and the second season of Pokémon the Series: XY, known in Japan as Pocket Monsters: XY (ポケットモンスター エックスワイ, Poketto Monsutā Ekkusu Wai). It originally aired in Japan from November 6, 2014, to October 22, 2015, on TV Tokyo, and in the United States from February 7 to December 19, 2015, on Cartoon Network.

The season follows Ash Ketchum as he continues travelling across the Kalos region with Serena, Clemont, and Bonnie.

The episodes were directed by Tetsuo Yajima and produced by the animation studio OLM.

This is the only dubbed Pokémon season whose subtitle is used only in the DVD releases and not used within the episodes' openings themselves (excluding the first two seasons, referred to simply as "Pokémon" during their first original airings).

== Episode list ==
| Jap. overall (Note: The English episode numbers are based on their first airing in the United States in syndication on Cartoon Network. Other English-speaking nations largely follow either this order or the Japanese order.) | Eng. overall | No. in season | English title Japanese title | Original release date | English air date |
|---|---|---|---|---|---|
| 850 | 844 | 1 | "Pathways to Performance Partnering!" (Dance, Yancham — Captivate, Fokko! The Dance for Tomorrow!!); Transliteration: "Odore Yanchamu, Misero Fokko! Ashita e no Suteppu!!" (Japanese: 踊れヤンチャム、魅せろフォッコ！明日へのステップ！！) | November 13, 2014 | February 7, 2015 |
After Pancham and Chespin get into a fight, Ash, Serena, Clemont, and Bonnie meet Nini, a Pokémon Performer preparing for the Pokémon Showcase. Serena demonstrates her Pokémon's performance to Nini. Nini helps Pancham improve its dance choreography for the Showcase. Team Rocket kidnaps Chespin, Fennekin, Pancham, and Nini's Pokémon: Smoochum and Farfetch'd. Pancham and Chespin temporarily stop fighting each other to team up and defeat Team Rocket.
| 851 | 845 | 2 | "An Undersea Place to Call Home!" (The Undersea Castle! Kuzumo and Dramidoro!!); Transliteration: "Kaitei no Shiro! Kuzumō to Doramidoro!!" (Japanese: 海底の城！クズモーとドラミドロ！！) | November 20, 2014 (Note: This episode is chronologically set before Ash's Gym battle with Grant in the XY episode "Climbing the Walls!" Due to the sinking of MV Sewol, the April 24, 2014, broadcast of this episode was delayed until November 20, 2014, due to its inclusion of a sunken ship.) | February 7, 2015 |
Ash and Serena join the marine archaeologist Lindsey on an expedition to the sunken luxury liner known as the Cussler where Skrelp, Dragalge, and several marine Pokémon live. However, Team Rocket tries stealing a safe containing treasure inside the Cussler, which makes its structure begin to collapse. Ash helps the Water Pokémon who live in the Cussler prevent the Cussler from collapsing.
| 852 | 846 | 3 | "When Light and Dark Collide!" (Luchabull and Dark Luchabull!); Transliteration: "Ruchaburu to Dāku Ruchaburu!" (Japanese: ルチャブルとダークルチャブル！) | November 27, 2014 | February 7, 2015 |
Mistaking a play rehearsal at the Super Pokémon Battle Show for an actual kidnapping of a Snubbull, Ash accidentally causes the show's star Gallade to be injured. Ash lets his Hawlucha understudy for Gallade while it recovers. Team Rocket tries stealing the Pokémon from the show. Ash's Hawlucha teams up with its Dark Hawlucha costar to beat them. When the show starts, Ash's Hawlucha and Dark Hawlucha have an unscripted battle with each other.
| 853 | 847 | 4 | "A Stealthy Challenge!" (Ninja Arts Showdown! Gekogashira VS Gamenodes!); Transliteration: "Ninpō Taiketsu! Gekogashira Tai Gamenodesu!!" (Japanese: 忍法対決！ゲコガシラ対ガメノデス！！) | December 11, 2014 | February 28, 2015 |
Sanpei's ninja master Saizo sends Sanpei on a mission to deliver a secret scroll to some fellow ninjas before sundown. The scroll is actually blank, and the mission is intended as a test to prove how much Sanpei has improved his ninja abilities. As part of the test, Saizo disguises himself as a masked ninja who pursues Sanpei and the scroll with a Barbaracle. Ash and Froakie assist in battle against Saizo's Barbaracle, during which Froakie evolves into Frogadier.
| 854 | 848 | 5 | "A Race for Home!" (Serena's Earnest! The Wild Meecle Race!!); Transliteration: "Serena no Honki! Gekisō Mēkuru Rēsu!" (Japanese: セレナの本気！激走メェークルレース！) | December 18, 2014 | March 7, 2015 |
When Serena's mother Grace meets up with the group on their journey and learns of her daughter's new goal of becoming a Pokémon Performer, Grace wonders if her daughter is truly dedicated to her goals so Serena challenges her to a Skiddo race to prove her determination.
| 855 | 849 | 6 | "Facing the Grand Design!" (Calamanero VS Maaiika! The Bonds that Would Save the World!!); Transliteration: "Karamanero Tai Māīka! Kizuna wa Sekai o Sukuu!!" (Japanese: カラマネロ対マーイーカ！絆は世界を救う！！) | December 25, 2014 | March 14, 2015 |
At the peak of a mountain called Grace Tower, three evil Malamar plot to change the world's environment to suit them using a device created by some scientists, while holding Ash, Pikachu, Serena, Bonnie, Jessie, and Officer Jenny captive. James, Meowth, and Clemont escape and convince a group of wild Inkay and Malamar to free their friends. An evil Malamar puts James's Inkay under hypnosis, but Inkay being reminded of its friendship with James frees it. Jenny's Manectric stops the device with a Thunder attack. The evil Malamar escapes into the future to avoid arrest.
| 856 | 850 | 7 | "A Slippery Encounter!" (The Weakest Dragon!? Numera Appears!!); Transliteration: "Saijaku no Doragon!? Numera Tōjō!!" (Japanese: 最弱のドラゴン！？ヌメラ登場！！) | January 8, 2015 | March 21, 2015 |
Ash and his friends encounter and rehydrate an extremely timid but friendly Goomy. Team Rocket kidnaps Pikachu and Goomy, but they break out of their cage with the help of Goomy's slippery body and return to Ash. Team Rocket has the upper hand in the battle against Ash when Inkay confuses Pikachu and Fletchinder. Goomy saves Pikachu and Fletchinder with a Bide attack, giving Pikachu enough time to break out of confusion and beat Team Rocket.
| 857 | 851 | 8 | "One for the Goomy!" (Do Your Best, Dedenne! Do it for Numera!!); Transliteration: "Dedenne Ganbaru! Numera no Tame ni!!" (Japanese: デデンネがんばる！ヌメラのために！！) | January 15, 2015 | March 28, 2015 |
Serena, Bonnie, Dedenne, Goomy and Pancham get separated from their friends when Team Rocket disturbs some Lotad and Lombre. When Goomy gets frightened off by Serena battling Team Rocket, Dedenne goes looking for it. Dedenne protects Goomy from being taken by Team Rocket. Ash, Serena, and Clemont find them and Pikachu finishes off Team Rocket.
| 858 | 852 | 9 | "Thawing an Icy Panic!" (Vanipeti Panic! An Ice-Covered Whiteout!!); Transliteration: "Baniputchi Panikku! Howaitoauto wa Kōrigōri!!" (Japanese: バニプッチ・パニック！ホワイトアウトはこおりごおり！！) | January 22, 2015 | April 4, 2015 |
In Coumarine City, Team Rocket steals a Vanillite to make ice cream from it, incurring the anger of its fellow Pokémon, Vanillish and Vanilluxe, who cause a sudden snowstorm. The Coumarine City Gym Leader Ramos has his Jumpluff use its Sunny Day to stop the snowstorm, while his many Sunflora melt the fallen snow with their combined Solar Beam. As a back-up plan, Team Rocket steals Vanillite, Vanillish and Vanilluxe with their giant robot. Ramos' Gogoat and Ash's Frogadier destroy the robot's air vent which is blasting cold air from the stolen Pokémon, and Pikachu frees the Pokémon with Iron Tail.
| 859 | 853 | 10 | "The Green, Green Grass Types of Home!" (Hiyoku Gym Battle! Gekogashira VS Gogoat!!); Transliteration: "Hiyoku Jimu Sen! Gekogashira Bui Esu Gōgōto!" (Japanese: ヒヨクジム戦！ゲコガシラVSゴーゴート！！) | January 29, 2015 | April 11, 2015 |
Ash arrives at the Coumarine City Gym to challenge Ramos for the Plant Badge.
| 860 | 854 | 11 | "Under the Pledging Tree!" (Satoshi and Serena's First Date!? The Tree of Promises and the Presents!!); Transliteration: "Satoshi to Serena Hatsu Dēto!? Chikai no Ki to Purezento!!" (Japanese: サトシとセレナ初デート！？誓いの樹とプレゼント！！) | February 5, 2015 | April 18, 2015 |
Coumarine City holds an annual festival to celebrate the bond between Trainer and Pokémon. When Ash has trouble deciding on a present for his Pokémon, Serena suggests getting them something that would make Ash happy, as they think just like he does. Inspired by Serena, Ash hand picks a bunch of berries for all of his Pokémon to feast on.
| 861 | 855 | 12 | "A Showcase Debut!" (Aim to be the Kalos Queen! Serena Makes her Debut!!); Transliteration: "Mezase Karos Kwīn! Serena, Debyū Desu!!" (Japanese: 目指せカロスクィーン！セレナ、デビューです！！) | February 12, 2015 | April 25, 2015 |
Serena, Shauna, and Jessie enter the Pokémon Showcase in Coumarine City. The theme for the first round is Pokémon styling. Serena loses in the first round after Fennekin trips up. Shauna wins enough votes from the audience in both rounds to win the contest and additionally, wins a Princess Key, Serena understands her mistake and rejoins the group with a haircut and new outfit.
| 862 | 856 | 13 | "An Oasis of Hope!" (Decisive Battle in the Wilderness! Fight, Numera!!); Transliteration: "Kōya no Kettō! Tatakae Numera!!" (Japanese: 荒野の決闘！戦えヌメラ！！) | February 19, 2015 | May 2, 2015 |
Ash and friends find and heal an injured Spoink in the Lumiose Badlands. The Spoink takes them to the area's oasis, where Team Rocket and a Grumpig bully have taken over the food and water. The Grumpig chases the group into a cave where Team Rocket traps Ash and friends inside a prison cell. Ash escapes, and while he defends Goomy from Grumpig, Goomy evolves into Sliggoo and defeats Grumpig.
| 863 | 857 | 14 | "The Future Is Now, Thanks to Determination!" (Protect the Future of Science! The Electric Labyrinth!!); Transliteration: "Saiensu no Mirai o Mamore! Denki no Meikyū!!" (Japanese: サイエンスの未来を守れ！電気の迷宮！！) | February 26, 2015 | May 9, 2015 |
Team Rocket takes over the Kalos Power Plant and use it to control the Electric Pokémon in the area with a microwave antenna, including Pikachu, Dedenne and Luxio, who enter the Power Plant with the other Pokémon. Ash and friends sneak inside. Clemont gets through to Luxio, who overloads the system with Discharge and stops the Pokémon-controlling waves, causing Luxio to evolve into Luxray with Clemont.
| 864 | 858 | 15 | "A Fork in the Road! A Parting of the Ways!" (A Fork in the Path of Indecision!? Musashi and Sonans!!); Transliteration: "Mayoimichi Wakaremichi!? Musashi to Sōnansu!!" (Japanese: 迷い道は分かれ道！？ムサシとソーナンス！！) | March 5, 2015 | May 16, 2015 |
Jessie and Wobbuffet are separated from James and Meowth after being sent flying by Pikachu's Thunderbolt. A doctor named White saves Jessie from drowning in a river. Jessie falls in love with White and decides to quit Team Rocket to live with him. When a Pokémon hunter steals Meowth, Inkay and Pumpkaboo, Jessie realizes that White is in love with his childhood friend Beatrice. Ash and Serena distract the hunter to help James free Team Rocket's Pokémon, and Jessie and Wobbuffet reunite with them. Ash and Serena temporarily team up with Team Rocket to defeat the hunter's Rhyperior.
| 865 | 859 | 16 | "Battling with Elegance And a Big Smile!" (Fokko VS Mahoxy! A Splendid Performance Battle!!); Transliteration: "Fokko VS Mafokushī! Karei Naru Pafōmansu Batoru!!" (Japanese: はフォッコVSマフォクシー！華麗なるパフォーマンスバトル！！) | March 12, 2015 | May 23, 2015 |
Pancham and Fennekin start fighting while training with Serena for their next Pokémon Showcase, and she inadvertently yells at them. The Kalos Queen Aria, disguised as a performer called Arianna, prompts Serena to apologize to Pancham and Fennekin. She challenges Serena to a double battle to show how Serena, Pancham and Fennekin can work as a team, during which Fennekin evolves into Braixen.
| 866 | 860 | 17 | "Good Friends, Great Training!" (Kameil and Raichu Appear! Good Luck Numeil!!); Transliteration: "Kamēru, Raichuu Tōjō! Numeiru Ganbaru!!" (Japanese: カメール、ライチュウ登場！ヌメイルがんばる！！) | March 26, 2015 | May 30, 2015 |
Ash reunites with Tierno and decides to prepare for his Lumiose Gym match by challenging Tierno to a double battle. While trying to steal Pikachu before the battle can start, Team Rocket takes Sliggoo and Tierno's Raichu and Wartortle by mistake. Jessie angrily frees the Pokémon when Wartortle soaks her hair. When Pumpkaboo starts a forest fire while trying to catch Pikachu, Sliggoo stops the fire with its Rain Dance, causing Sliggoo evolves into Goodra, who defeats Team Rocket with its new move, Dragon Pulse.
| 867 | 861 | 18 | "Confronting the Darkness!" (The Miare City Investigation! Citroid VS Black Citroid!!); Transliteration: "Miare Shiti Sōsasen! Shitoroido tai Burakku Shitoroido!!" (Japanese: ミアレシティ走査線！シトロイド対ブラック・シトロイド！！) | April 2, 2015 | June 6, 2015 |
Ash and the others arrive in Lumiose City and reunite with Clemont and discover that a robot builder called Belmondo had invented a Dark Clembot robot, which he had been using to commit crimes all over the city to frame Clemont's Clembot. Clemont discovers Clembot's blueprints were stolen in a hack of the Prism Tower computer, and traces the hack to Belmondo. Allying with Officer Jenny, Clemont and a freed Clembot head to the museum to stop Belmondo and Dark Clembot from sneaking inside.
| 868 | 862 | 19 | "The Moment of Lumiose Truth!" (Miare Gym Battle! Satoshi VS Citron!!); Transliteration: "Miare Jimu Sen! Satoshi VS Shitoron!!" (Japanese: ミアレジム戦！サトシVSシトロン！！) | April 9, 2015 | June 13, 2015 |
Ash starts his match against Clemont in Prism Tower to win a Voltage Badge.
| 869 | 863 | 20 | "Garchomp's Mega Bond!" (The Coveted Mega Evolution! Gaburias's Bonds!!); Transliteration: "Neraware ta Megashinka! Gaburiasu no Kizuna!!" (Japanese: 狙われたメガシンカ！ガブリアスの絆！！) | April 16, 2015 | June 20, 2015 |
Ash and the others visit Professor Sycamore to observe his experiment with a Key Stone and a Mega Stone called Garchompite. However, when Team Rocket crashes the experiment and gets away with the Key Stone, the Garchompite and Garchomp, Ash attaches a tracking device to them for him and the others to follow their escape, in order to retrieve the Key Stone, the Garchompite and Garchomp.
| 870 | 864 | 21 | "Defending the Homeland!" (Battle in the Wetlands! Numelgon VS Florges!!); Transliteration: "Shicchi tai no Tatakai! Numerugon tai Furājesu!!" (Japanese: 湿地帯の戦い！ヌメルゴン対フラージェス！！) | April 23, 2015 | June 27, 2015 |
Ash and his friends return to the wetlands Goodra originally lived in as a Goomy before the Pokémon there were terrorized by a Florges and its army of Bug-type Pokémon. Goodra protects its friends from being attacked by Florges. When it seems that Goodra has won, Jessie's Pumpkaboo and James's Inkay create a distraction, allowing Florges to retreat. Later, some Bug Pokémon steal Pikachu and Dedenne.
| 871 | 865 | 22 | "Beyond the Rainbow!" (Conclusion! Numelgon, Go Over the Rainbow!!); Transliteration: "Kecchaku! Numerugon Niji no Kanata ni!!" (Japanese: 決着！ヌメルゴン虹の彼方に！！) | April 30, 2015 | July 4, 2015 |
Team Rocket deceives Florges into an alliance to help the sickly Floette it is taking care of. They double-cross Florges when they drain all the water in the spring Florges had taken over to heal Floette. Team Rocket takes the water, Pikachu and Dedenne in their airship, and Ash and Goodra ally with Florges to stop them. Florges frees the stolen Pokémon, but the water is lost during the battle. Goodra uses its Rain Dance and Florges uses its Grassy Terrain to restore the dried up wetlands to life. Believing that Goodra belongs in the wetlands, Ash decides to leave it behind.
| 872 | 866 | 23 | "So You're Having a Bad Day!" (The Worst Luck? Eureka VS Nyarth!!); Transliteration: "Unsei Saiaku? Yurīka tai Nyāsu!!" (Japanese: 運勢最悪? ユリーカ対ニャース！！) | May 7, 2015 | July 11, 2015 |
When Team Rocket steals some Berries from some Pangoro (who are enraged at the theft), Ash's group and Team Rocket get separated. Bonnie and Dedenne find themselves lost in the forest with Meowth, with Bonnie and Meowth getting stuck together.
| 873 | 867 | 24 | "Scary Hospitality!" (The Scary House's Welcoming Services!); Transliteration: "Kowaiie no Omotenashi!" (Japanese: こわいイエのおもてなし！) | May 14, 2015 | July 18, 2015 |
Ash and his friends find themselves in a mansion called the Scary House to shelter from the rain. Its owner Lon offers them some food. A Gastly, Haunter and Gengar scare Ash and his friends as a playful way of showing hospitality. Ash, Pikachu, Serena and Bonnie fall down some trapdoors into the basement. After rescuing them, Clemont finds a 200-year-old journal which talks about the secret room the trapdoors lead to which was created for Lon to hide in when he was a boy. Ash and the others are shocked to discover a 200-year-old photograph of Lon and that Lon is no longer alive. Afterwards, everyone wakes up in the forest, with Ash, Serena and Clemont unsure if they were dreaming.
| 874 | 868 | 25 | "A Fashionable Battle!" (Battle at the Fashion Show! Tatsubay VS Shushupu!!); Transliteration: "Fasshonshō de Batoru desu! Tatsubei VS Shushupu!!" (Japanese: ファッションショーでバトルです！タツベイVSシュシュプ！！) | May 21, 2015 | July 25, 2015 |
Ash and his friends finally arrive in Laverre City and immediately head over to the Gym only to find it closed due to its seasonal Fashion Show. They instead meet Sawyer, who had a Gym battle with Clemont recently and gets to challenge the Gym Leader Valerie during the show. Sawyer's Dragon-type Pokémon Bagon loses to Valerie's Fairy-type Spritzee due to a type disadvantage.
| 875 | 869 | 26 | "Fairy-Type Trickery!" (Kunoe Gym Battle! The Beautiful Fairy Trap!!); Transliteration: "Kunoe Jimu Sen! Utsukushiki Fearī no Wana! !" (Japanese: クノエジム戦！美しきフェアリーの罠！！) | May 28, 2015 | August 1, 2015 |
Ash challenges Valerie to a two-on-two Gym battle for the Fairy Badge.
| 876 | 870 | 27 | "Rivals: Today and Tomorrow!" (Three-Match Rival Battle! Towards the Future!!); Transliteration: "Raibaru Batoru San hon Shōbu! Ashita ni Mukatte!!" (Japanese: ライバルバトル3本勝負！ 明日に向かって！！) | June 4, 2015 | August 8, 2015 |
Sawyer accidentally loses his notebook, which is found by Team Rocket who think it belongs to Steven Stone, the Hoenn League Champion and that the information inside it will help them with their plans. Ash and Sawyer prove Team Rocket wrong and stop them from stealing the group's Pokémon.
| 877 | 871 | 28 | "A Not-So-Flying Start!" (The Wind, the Egg and Onbat!); Transliteration: "Kaze to Tamago to Onbatto!" (Japanese: 風とタマゴとオンバット！) | June 11, 2015 | August 22, 2015 |
Hawlucha finds a Pokémon egg near a tree. When Hawlucha hands the egg to Ash, it hatches into a Noibat. Ash, Ash's friends, and their Pokémon help find some Berries for the hungry Noibat to eat. Although Noibat is unable to fly very well, Team Rocket plots to take it and make it evolve into a more useful Noivern.
| 878 | 872 | 29 | "A Relay in the Sky!" (The Pokémon Sky Relay Challenge! Fly, Onbat!!); Transliteration: "Chōsen Pokemon Sukai Rirē! Tobe, Onbatto!!" (Japanese: 挑戦ポケモンスカイリレー！飛べ、オンバット！！) | June 18, 2015 | August 29, 2015 |
Ash competes in the Pokémon Sky Relay, a race for flying Pokémon, and enters with Fletchinder, Hawlucha and Noibat to train Noibat to fly properly. Team Rocket, expecting Noibat to evolve during the race, enters the race with Pumpkaboo, Meowth (piloting a Pelipper-shaped machine), and Inkay to steal Noibat when it evolves.
| 879 | 884 | 30 | "Lights! Camera! Pika!" (Pikachu Becomes a Star!? Its Movie Debut!!) (How to Pikachu The Movie! OK! Action!!) The Lightning-fast Hero! Super Pikachu!! Transliteration: "Pikachu no dokidoki NG taishō" (Japanese: ピカチュウはスター！？映画デビュー！! How to ピカチュウ・ザ・ムービー！よーい！アクション！！ 迅雷のヒーロー！スーパーピカチュウ！！) | June 18, 2015 | November 21, 2015 |
Ash and his friends arrive at a village, where they meet a group of Pikachu and their owners, Frank and Jean. Impressed with Ash's Pikachu, Frank wants to cast him in a movie with the Cosplay Pikachu.
| 880 | 873 | 31 | "A Frenzied Factory Fiasco!" (Fierce Battle in the Monster Ball Factory! Pikachu VS Nyarth!!); Transliteration: "Gekitō Monsutā Bōru Kōjō! Pikachuu VS Nyāsu!!" (Japanese: 激闘モンスターボール工場！ピカチュウVSニャース！！) | June 25, 2015 | September 5, 2015 |
Ash and his friends arrive at a factory which makes Poké Balls. Team Rocket tricks them into handing over their Pokémon, while also stealing the Poké Balls in the factory.
| 881 | 874 | 32 | "Performing with Fiery Charm!" (Tairenar and Yancham!! A Captivating Fiery Performance!!); Transliteration: "Tērunā to Yanchamu!! Misero Honoo no Pafōmansu!!" (Japanese: テールナーとヤンチャム！！魅せろ炎のパフォーマンス！！) | July 2, 2015 | September 12, 2015 |
Serena, Jessie, and Serena's old rival Miette compete in the Pokémon Showcase in Dendemille Town. They make it through the themed round by cooking Poké Puffs that impress the judges and their Pokémon. Serena wins her first Princess Key after the audience votes Pancham and Braixen's performance in the freestyle round their favorite.
| 882 | 875 | 33 | "Rotom's Wish!" (Satoshi Leaps Through Time! Rotom's Wish!!); Transliteration: "Toki o Kakeru Satoshi! Rotomu no Negai!!" (Japanese: 時をかけるサトシ！ロトムの願い！！) | July 9, 2015 | September 19, 2015 |
Ash and the others check in to run-down hotel, where its owner Mantle wagers Pokémon as prizes for battles. They meet a timid Rotom once owned by the front desk clerk Weston. Rotom uses a television to show Ash and the others that ten years ago at the founding of the hotel, Weston had lost ownership of the hotel to Mantle by forfeiting a match after Rotom was scared off. Rotom sends Ash and his friends ten years into the past to change history.
| 883 | 876 | 34 | "A Festival Trade! A Festival Farewell?" (The Pumpjin Festival! Farewell, Bakeccha!?); Transliteration: "Panpujin Fesutibaru! Sayonara Bakeccha!?" (Japanese: パンプジンフェスティバル！さよならバケッチャ！?) | July 23, 2015 | September 26, 2015 |
Ash, his friends, and Team Rocket arrive at a town holding the Gourgeist Festival, where humans and Pokémon get dressed up in costume. Jessie tricks the castle's count, Count Pumpka, into thinking that Ash and his friends are Pokémon thieves who took Team Rocket's Pikachu and asks him to retrieve Pikachu in return for Count Pumpka's Prince Pumpkaboo to live with Jessie's Pumpkaboo, who are mutually attracted to each other.
| 884 | 877 | 35 | "Over the Mountain of Snow!" (Crossing the Snow Mountains! Mammoo and Yukinooh!!); Transliteration: "Yukiyama o Koete! Manmū to Yukino ō!!" (Japanese: 雪山をこえて！マンムーとユキノオー！！) | July 30, 2015 | October 3, 2015 |
Ash and his friends ride on some Mamoswine to climb a snowy mountain which they have to pass through to get to Anistar City. The Mamoswine lead them to a cave where an Abomasnow is taking care of a sick Snover. Ash and his friends go looking for plants that grow on the mountain to make medicine to help Snover. Team Rocket snatches Abomasnow, but Braixen and Chespin free Abomasnow from its net.
| 885 | 878 | 36 | "Adventures in Running Errands!" (Harimaron! Its First Errand!!); Transliteration: "Harimaron! Hajimete no o Tsukai!!" (Japanese: ハリマロン ！はじめてのつかい！！) | August 13, 2015 | October 10, 2015 |
A Pokémon Center loses power due to the generator short-circuiting from a leaky roof. Clemont starts repairs on the generator, while Ash fixes the roof. Clemont sends Chespin and Bunnelby on an errand to pick up a replacement fuse for the generator. After they successfully bring a new fuse from the shop, Clemont brings the Pokémon Center back online.
| 886 | 879 | 37 | "Mending a Broken Spirit!" (A Broken Twig and a Broken Heart! Tairenar's Strong Feelings!!); Transliteration: "Ore ta sae Ore ta Kokoro! Tērunā no Tsuyoki Omoi!!" (Japanese: 折れた小枝、折れた心！テールナーの強い思い！！) | August 20, 2015 | October 17, 2015 |
When Braixen accidentally breaks her branch while practicing for the next Pokémon Showcase, Serena seeks help after seeing that the branch means so much to her Pokémon. Serena goes to the famous tree surgeon Mr. Woodward to have Braixen's branch repaired. Woodward has his Gallade battle Braixen to help prove Serena and Braixen's desire to have the branch repaired. Team Rocket interrupts the match, and Braixen further shatters her branch fighting them off. Woodward explains to Braixen that while holding onto precious things from the past is fine, being too attached can leave someone stuck in the past. Braixen accepts a new branch from Pancham.
| 887 | 880 | 38 | "A Legendary Photo Op!" (Photo Op on Fire! Snap the Legend!!); Transliteration: "Shattā Chansu wa Faiyā! Densetsu o Tore!!" (Japanese: シャッターチャンスはファイヤー ！伝説を撮れ！！) | August 27, 2015 | October 24, 2015 |
Ash and friends reunite with Trevor. He explains his interest in snapping a picture of the legendary Moltres rumored to have been spotted nearby on Mt. Molteau. When Team Rocket comes to steal Pikachu once more, their battle disturbs Moltres.
| 888 | 881 | 39 | "The Tiny Caretaker!" (Eureka the Caretaker! The Spoiled Chigoras!!); Transliteration: "Yurīka Osewa desu! Amaenbō no Chigorasu!!" (Japanese: ユリーカお世話です！甘えん坊のチゴラス！！) | September 10, 2015 | October 31, 2015 |
When Team Rocket tries and fails to steal a Tyrunt from a Pokémon fossil research laboratory. Bonnie finds Tyrunt stuck between some rocks in a river and rescues it. Bonnie and Tyrunt try escaping from Team Rocket, but get cornered. When Team Rocket drops Bonnie from above, Tyrunt evolves into Tyrantrum and saves her life. After Tyrantrum beats Team Rocket, its original owners take it back to the laboratory.
| 889 | 882 | 40 | "A Trip Down Memory Train!" (Memories of the Train! Citron and Horubee!!); Transliteration: "Tsuioku no Torein! Shitoron to Horubī!!" (Japanese: 追憶のトレイン！シトロンとホルビー！！) | September 17, 2015 | November 7, 2015 |
After defeating Team Rocket, Clemont and Bonnie tell Ash and Serena a story of how they first met Bunnelby.
| 890 | 883 | 41 | "A Frolicking Find in the Flowers!" (The Eievui Who is Shy of Strangers!? Capture at the Flower Garden!!); Transliteration: "ībui wa Hito Mishiri!? Ohanabatake de Tsukamae te!!" (Japanese: イーブイはひとみしり！？お花畑でつかまえて！！) | September 24, 2015 | November 14, 2015 |
Serena finds an Eevee who loves dancing and performing, but it turns out to be shy and afraid of people. Serena sets out to bond with it.
| 891 | 885 | 42 | "Tag Team Battle Inspiration!" (A Tag Battle is a Friendship Battle! Eievui's First Time in a Fight!!); Transliteration: "Taggu batoru wa Yūjō Batoru! ībui Hatsu Sansen!!" (Japanese: タッグバトルは友情バトル！イーブイ初参戦！！) | October 1, 2015 | November 28, 2015 |
While Serena helps her newly captured Eevee, Tierno and Shauna, along with their newly evolved Blastoise and Ivysaur, appear and help her to attempt to address Eevee's shyness.
| 892 | 886 | 43 | "A Performance Pop Quiz!" (The Happy Dance Comes After the Quiz!? The Hyakkoku TriPokalon Tournament!!); Transliteration: "Happī Dansu wa Kuizu no Ato de!? Toraipokaron Hyakkoku Taikai!!" (Japanese: ハッピーダンスはクイズのあとで！？トライポカロン・ヒャッコク大会！！) | October 8, 2015 | December 5, 2015 |
The time has come for Serena's third Pokémon Showcase. Serena gets ready to begin her next performance hoping to obtain her second key in the Showcase.
| 893 | 887 | 44 | "Cloudy Fate, Bright Future!" (The Crisis in Kalos! The Battle of the Giant Sundial!!); Transliteration: "Karosu no Kiki! Kyodai Hidokei no Tatakai!!" (Japanese: カロスの危機！巨大日時計の戦い！！) | October 15, 2015 | December 12, 2015 |
With the Showcase a success for Serena, Ash and his friends continue their visit to Anistar City for Ash's next gym battle with Olympia who foresees the events of the future. After meeting her and learning about Frogadier's past, the Anistar sundial seems to be in trouble.
| 894 | 888 | 45 | "All Eyes on the Future!" (The Double Battle in the Hyakkoku Gym! Gojika's Future Sight!!); Transliteration: "Hyakkokujimu no Daburu Batoru! Gojika no Mirai Yochi!!" (Japanese: ヒャッコクジムのダブルバトル！ゴジカの未来予知!!) | October 22, 2015 | December 19, 2015 |
The time for Ash's Gym Battle has finally arrived. He gets prepared to win his next Gym Badge.

=== Special episodes ===
| Jap. overall | Eng. overall | No. in season | English title Japanese title | Original release date | English air date |
|---|---|---|---|---|---|
| SP–6 | SP–2 | SP–1 | "Pokémon: Mega Evolution Special II" (The Strongest Mega Evolution: Act II); Transliteration: "Saikyō Mega Shinka ~Act II~" (Japanese: 最強メガシンカ～Act II～) | November 6, 2014 | February 7, 2015 |
Alain continues his journey to find and defeat all of the Mega Evolutions in the world. He next meets up with the Hoenn League Champion, Steven Stone, who has also been traveling to understand the secrets of Mega Evolution and the Mega Stones, but both are caught off guard when Rayquaza appears in the skies.
| SP–7 | SP–3 | SP–2 | "Pokémon: Mega Evolution Special III" (The Strongest Mega Evolution: Act III); Transliteration: "Saikyō Mega Shinka ~Act III~" (Japanese: 最強メガシンカ～Act III～) | March 19, 2015 | August 15, 2015 |
Alain and Steven must find a way to stop an apocalyptic clash between Groudon, Kyogre and Rayquaza before these titans turn the Hoenn Region into a ruin.
| — | — | — | "Hoopa, The Mischief Pokémon" (The Minidjinni of the Word "Appear!": Hoopa); Transliteration: "O Demashi ko Majin Fūpa" (Japanese: おでまし小魔神フーパ) | June 19, 2015 | December 3, 2015 |
The story is set when Hoopa's companions, Baraz and Meray, were still children. The three of them lived happily together with the villagers in a far away place from Désser City known as "Arkhē Valley", where Hoopa later met Ash and his friends. Everyone there loved Hoopa's rings, which could make anything and everything appear! One day, the three of them were helping an old woman make donuts. Hoopa's eyes started glittering at the sight of these round treats it had never seen before! When Hoopa's rings get used to make donuts, could things get silly? Note: It is a special episode that serves as a prologue to Hoopa and the Clash of Ages.
| SP–8 | SP–4 | SP–3 | "Pokémon: Mega Evolution Special IV" (The Strongest Mega Evolution: Act IV); Transliteration: "Saikyō Mega Shinka ~Act IV~" (Japanese: 最強メガシンカ～Act IV～) | October 29, 2015 | December 26, 2015 |
Alain has returned to Kalos with Lysandre to be tested in a match against ten Mega Evolved Pokémon. Alain loses his Mega Stone and Key Stone if he fails. Meanwhile, Chespin discovers scientists performing experiments on an unknown Pokémon, which leads it to fall victim to a mysterious illness.

== Music ==
The Japanese opening songs are "Mega V (Mega Volt)" (メガV (メガボルト), Megaboruto) performed by Yusuke Kaiji for 6 episodes, and "Mad-Paced Getter" (ゲッタバンバン, Getta Banban) performed by Tomohisa Sako for 39 episodes. The ending songs are "DreamDream" (ドリドリ, DoriDori) performed by Shoko Nakagawa for 19 episodes, "Roaring All-Stars" (ガオガオ・オールスター, Gaogao Ōrusutā) performed by Little Glee Monster for 26 episodes, and the English opening song is "Be a Hero", performed by Ben Dixon and The Sad Truth, featuring composer Ed Goldfarb. Its instrumental version serves as the ending theme.

== Home media releases ==
Viz Media and Warner Home Video have released the series in the United States on two three-disc volume sets.

The first volume was released on July 12, 2016, and contains 22 episodes and the second was released on December 13, 2016, and contains 23 episodes.

The complete season was released on September 24, 2024, and contains all 45 episodes.
