= Talonflame =

Pokémon species

- Pokémon character
- Talonflame artwork by Ken Sugimori
- First game: Pokémon X and Y (2013)
- Designed by: Ken Sugimori
- Voiced by: Kiyotaka Furushima

In-universe information
- Species: Pokémon
- Type: Fire and Flying

Talonflame (/ˈtælənfleɪm/), known in Japan as Fiarrow (Japanese: ファイアロー, Hepburn: Faiarō), is a Pokémon species in Nintendo and Game Freak's Pokémon media franchise, and the evolved form of Fletchinder, which in turn evolves from Fletchling. First introduced in the video games Pokémon X and Y (2013), it was designed by Ken Sugimori and is believed to be based on one or more birds of prey. Since Talonflame's debut, it has appeared in multiple games including Pokémon Go and the Pokémon Trading Card Game, as well as various merchandise.

Classified as a Fire and Flying-type Pokémon, Talonflame is a bird Pokémon with "harsh orange" and pale blue feathers. It has an ability that allows it to attack an opponent first if Talonflame's attack is Flying-type, as well as a technique that increases speed for Talonflame and its allies. This contributed to it becoming among the most powerful and dominant Pokémon in X and Y's competitive scene, making it the subject of memes and disdain by competitive players.

Talonflame was eventually weakened in Pokémon Sun and Moon, becoming less prominent in competitive play. As a Pokémon, Talonflame has been received well, praised by multiple critics for being a better "early-route bird" Pokémon than others.

== Conception and design ==
Talonflame is a species of fictional creatures called Pokémon created for the Pokémon media franchise. Developed by Game Freak and published by Nintendo, the Japanese franchise began in 1996 with the video games Pokémon Red and Green for the Game Boy, which were later released in North America as Pokémon Red and Blue in 1998. In these games and their sequels, the player assumes the role of a Trainer whose goal is to capture and use the creatures' special abilities to combat other Pokémon. Some Pokémon can transform into stronger species through a process called evolution via various means, such as exposure to specific items. Each Pokémon has one or two elemental types, which define its advantages and disadvantages when battling other Pokémon. A major goal in each game is to complete the Pokédex, a comprehensive Pokémon encyclopedia, by capturing, evolving, and trading with other Trainers to obtain individuals from all Pokémon species.

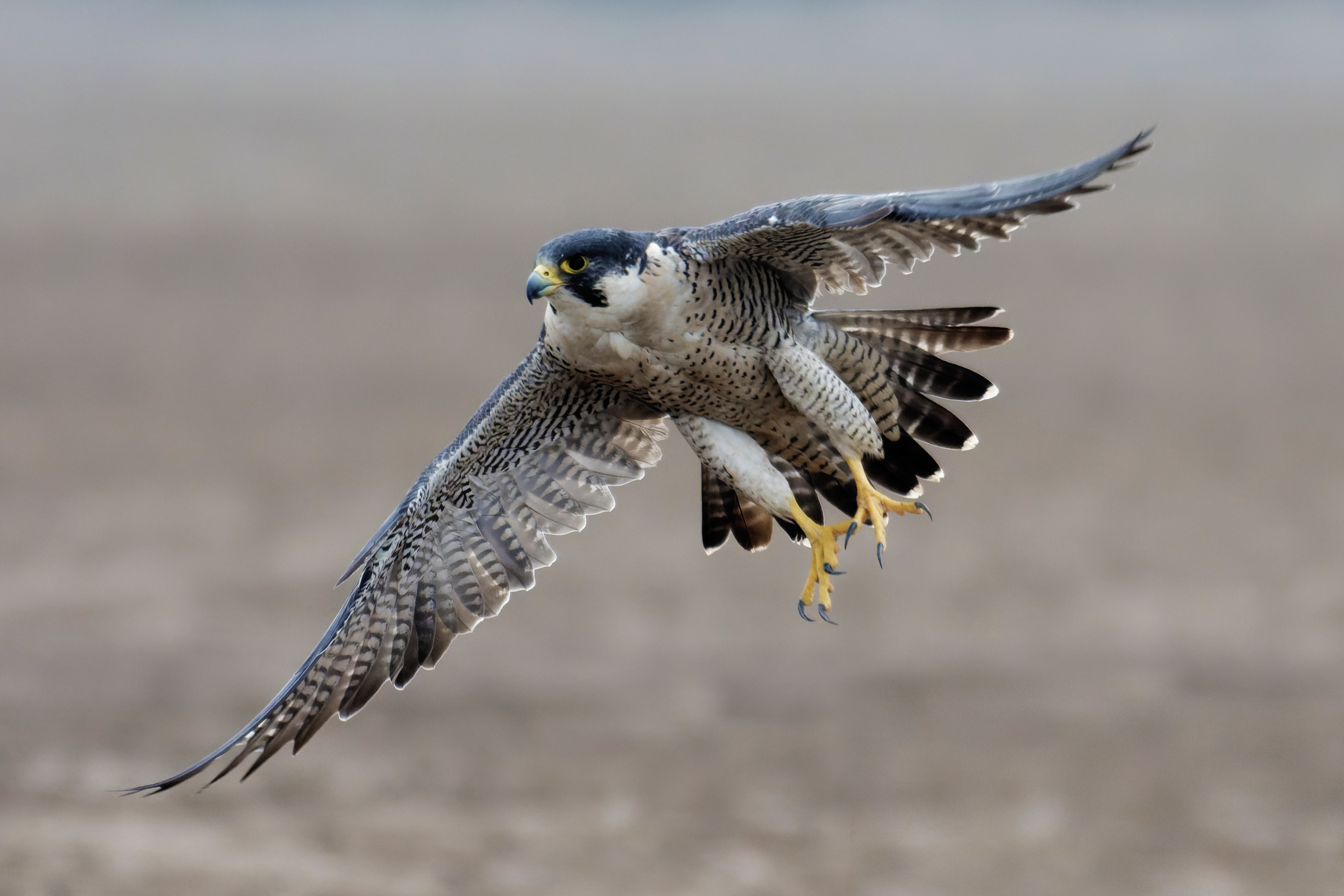
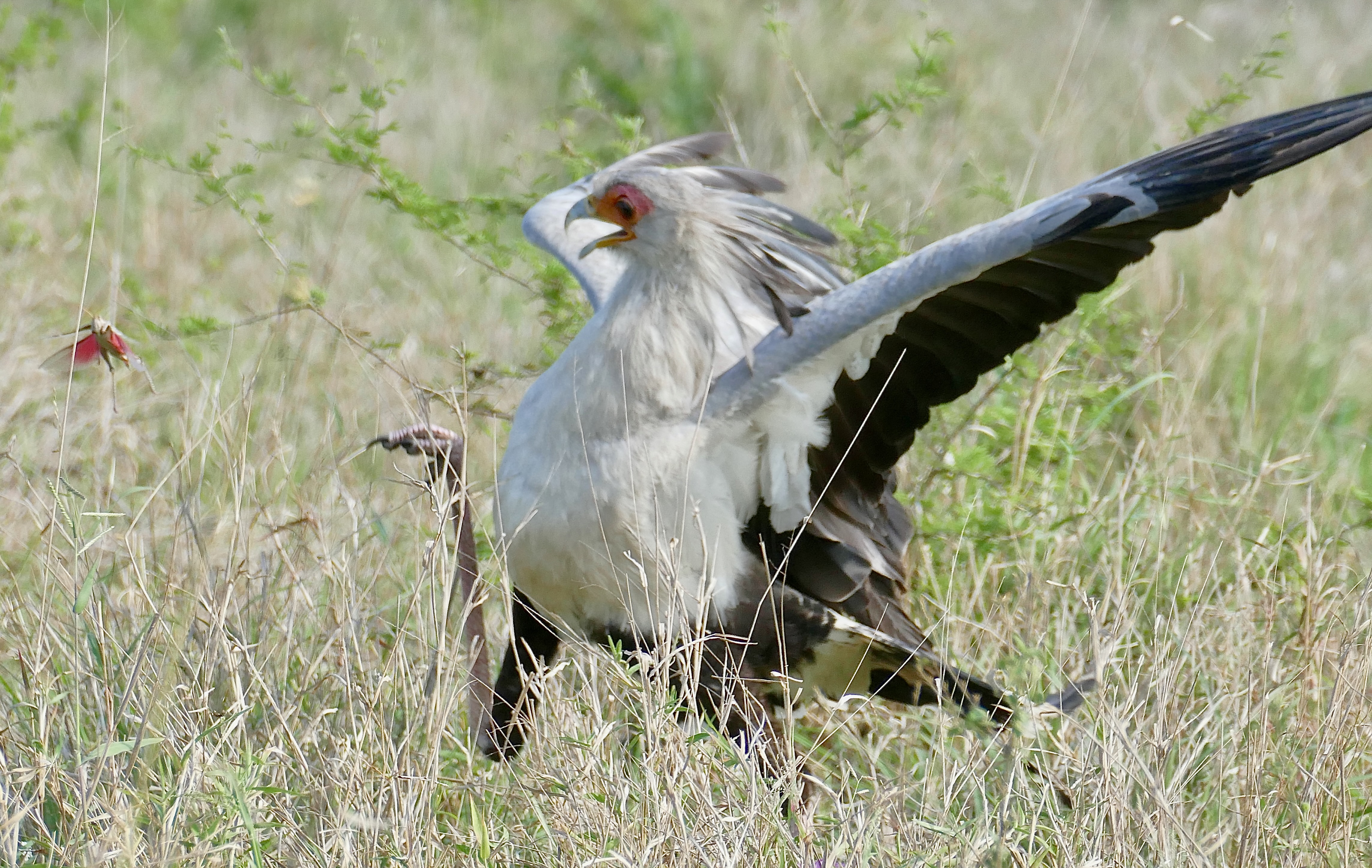
Talonflame is believed to be based on different birds of prey, with comparisons made to species such as the peregrine falcon (left) and the secretarybird (right) due to similarities in their speed, body shape and behavior.

Talonflame is an avian Pokémon, classified in-game as the "Scorching Pokémon" and as a Fire and Flying-type Pokémon. It evolves from Fletchinder, a bird Pokémon of the same type, which evolves from the Pokémon Fletchling. Unlike its later forms, Fletchling has no Fire type, instead being Normal and Flying like many previous regional bird Pokémon. Talonflame's design is believed to be influenced by raptors; notably the peregrine falcon, due to its speed and body shape, and the secretary bird because of its kicking move when performing Brave Bird. When comparing Talonflame to real life birds, Carpenter Nature Center executive director Jennifer Vieth noted it was likely faster than the world's current fastest bird, the peregrine falcon, travelling at 310 miles per hour (500 km/h) compared to the falcon's 248 miles per hour (399 km/h). Vieth speculated that if Talonflame existed in the real world, it would likely injure itself if it missed catching its prey because of its flight speed, comparing this attribute to other real birds of prey. Its English name derives from a combination of the words "talon" and "flame". When Talonflame flies, it drops embers from its wings, and its feathers have been used by firefighters to create fire-proof uniforms. It is a fast Pokémon, reaching over 300 miles per hour (480 km/h) speeds.

Talonflame's signature ability is Gale Wings, which Flying-type moves to take priority over other Pokémon's moves. In Pokémon Sun and Moon, this ability functions differently, stipulating that Talonflame only gets priority if it has max health. It has an alternative ability called Flame Body, which has two effects: in battle, if a Pokémon makes contact with an attack to Talonflame, that Pokémon has a chance to be burned, halving the damage of future attacks and doing damage to them each turn. Out of battle, Flame Body causes eggs held by the player's character to hatch faster. Talonflame can learn moves such as Brave Bird, a high-power attack that does a recoil damage, Acrobatics, an attack made more powerful if Talonflame is not holding an item, and Tailwind, a technique that gives it and any ally Pokémon doubled speed.

== Appearances ==
Talonflame first appeared in Pokémon X and Y, found exclusively by evolving from a Fletchinder. It later appears in the sequels, Pokémon Sun and Moon, available by trading the Pokémon Bewear with a non-playable character for a Talonflame. It was initially absent from Pokémon Sword and Shield until the release of the Isle of Armor downloadable content. Talonflame can be found in the wild in the mobile game Pokémon Go, alongside its earlier evolutions. Outside of the mainline games, Talonflame also appears in games such as New Pokémon Snap and Pokémon Unite. In the latter game, it is a Speedster type character, able to move around quicker than other non-Speedsters. It has also appeared as a card in the Pokémon Trading Card Game.

In the Pokémon TV series, protagonist Ash Ketchum features a Talonflame on his team, having evolved it from his Fletchinder in the episode "A Legendary Photo Op!". It was featured in his final team in a championship tournament, the Kalos Lumiose Conference. Ash would later send Talonflame to live with Professor Oak. It has received multiple pieces of merchandise, including plushes and food. In Pokémon the Movie: Volcanion and the Mechanical Marvel, it was voiced by Kiyotaka Furushima.

== Critical reception ==
Talonflame was a competitively powerful Pokémon species in Pokémon X and Y, commonly referred to as a "most valuable bird" on any team featuring it due to its Gale Wings ability. In particular, the ability for a Talonflame to easily do extreme damage to an opponent no matter how fast they are was a large part of why it was so powerful. In addition to its effectiveness as an attacker, Talonflame was also strong as a support Pokémon, able to use the move Tailwind to help powerful but slow Pokémon become faster. Despite being so dominant, it was initially viewed as a useless Pokémon, which changed once people understood how to use its ability to maximize its effectiveness. Its first showing at a Pokémon tournament was at the 2014 Video Game Championships (VGC) event, used in 41.46 percent of teams. It was the second most used Pokémon in the 2014 tournament, behind Garchomp and ahead of Kangaskhan. It experienced a drop in popularity in 2015. In future VGCs, it appeared on approximately 20 percent of teams, its decline associated with new metas that were disadvantageous towards Talonflame. It became more popular in 2016, being part of one of VGC's most "dominant archetypes" called the Big 6. It benefited from both Tailwind supporting its partners and being able to take on powerful Pokémon like Xerneas.

When Pokémon Sun and Moon released, it continued to be used in competitive play, though experienced low levels of usefulness due to Gale Wings being weakened. This was met with "shock, amusement, and joy." Talonflame remained useful due to being a good Tailwind user, being among the best users of the move at VGC in 2017. Dot Esports writer Yash Nair felt that the changes to its ability helped make it more balanced. Krell described it as the most-hated Pokémon in the series' competitive play, stating that "wise competitive players" at the time designed their Pokémon teams with the intention of countering a Talonflame used by their opponent. According to Krell, it became a "notorious meme" among competitive Pokémon players, earning the pejorative nickname "Smogonbird" with players on the competitive Pokémon website Smogon. Destructoid writer Timothy Monbleau considered it one of the most infamous Pokémon in the series' competitive history, noting that, in addition to its speed and strength, its combination of Fire and Flying types made it particularly resistant to other types of damage. It showed a drop in popularity since VGC in 2017. Talonflame was featured on the winning team of Kaito Arii at the Scarlet and Violet 2023 Japan National Champion tournament, featuring a set of moves that were unorthodox for the Pokémon. In particular, it used a Flying-type attack called Acrobatics, which is stronger if the user is not holding an item. His success with Talonflame was the subject of a lot of commentary at the tournament venue and on social media. In Scarlet and Violet competitive play, Nair stated that Talonflame ended up replacing the Pokémon Murkrow, which had been a dominant Pokémon due to its ability to set up Tailwind as a support Pokémon. He attributed it taking over from Murkrow to various factors, including Talonflame's superior power and typing.

In 2020, Talonflame was voted among the most popular Pokémon introduced in Kalos in an official online poll. Pocket Tactics writer Connor Christie considered it one of the best Pokémon of X and Y, remarking that it stood out among other early bird Pokémon before it by giving it a Fire type. USA Today's Cian Maher agreed, believing it was the best final evolution for an "early-route bird" in the series' history. He praised it for its power and stating that it earned a spot on most favorite Pokémon lists it qualifies for. Fellow USA Today writer Ryan Woodrow also praised Talonflame, stating that it was the quintessential animal-based Pokémon, arguing that it takes the best part of its real-world inspiration and adds fantastical elements without losing the realism. Woodrow enjoyed its color scheme, stating that the "harsh orange" and pale blue color combination both helped make it interesting to look at and invoked its fire connection. He compared it favorably to Moltres, which he believed served as an example of a Fire bird that "over[does]" its Fire-type inspiration. Writing for Nintendo World Report, Becky Hollada stated that she never had much of an affinity for most Flying-type Pokémon species, featuring them on her team only for their ability to help her explore the map, but felt different about Talonflame. She noted that it was the first Flying-type Pokémon that she grew attached to, citing various reasons for her affinity, including its Fire type, ability to help hatch eggs faster, and being a fast Pokémon.
