= Malamar =

Pokémon species

- Pokémon character
- Malamar artwork by Ken Sugimori
- First game: Pokémon X and Y (2013)
- Created by: Hitoshi Ariga
- Designed by: Hitoshi Ariga; Ken Sugimori (finalized)
- Voiced by: Kensuke Satō

In-universe information
- Species: Pokémon
- Type: Dark and Psychic

Malamar (/ˈmæləmɑːr/), known in Japan as Calamanero (Japanese: カラマネロ, Hepburn: Karamanero), is a Pokémon species in Nintendo and Game Freak's Pokémon franchise. First appearing in the 2013 games Pokémon X and Y, Malamar was designed by artist Hitoshi Ariga, was designed to resemble how squids appear in scientific textbooks, often with their tentacles facing upwards; Ariga believed this would also give a clue to players on how to obtain Malamar, as the game console being used must be flipped upside-down in order to evolve Malamar from its pre-evolved form, Inkay. Ariga made flipping a part of Inkay and Malamar's visual identity to further this connection.

Malamar is classified as a Dark and Psychic type Pokémon. In the franchise's fictional universe, Malamar have strong hypnotism abilities, which they use to lure in prey to feed on them. Since its introduction, Malamar has appeared in numerous games within the series, with a group of them serving as recurring antagonists in the Pokémon anime series. An additional form of Malamar, dubbed Mega Malamar, was introduced in the 2025 game Pokémon Legends: Z-A. To promote this inclusion, a marketing campaign dubbed "My Friend Malamar" was held, depicting characters being hypnotized by Mega Malamar into admiring and praising it.

Since its inception, Malamar has been considered an interesting inclusion due to its unique method of evolution. Other critics have commented on its more malicious nature within the franchise, as well as aspects of its visual design, including the design of Mega Malamar.

== Conception and development ==
Malamar is a species of fictional creatures called Pokémon created for the Pokémon media franchise. Developed by Game Freak and published by Nintendo, the Japanese franchise began in 1996 with the video games Pokémon Red and Green for the Game Boy, which were later released in North America as Pokémon Red and Blue in 1998. In these games and their sequels, the player assumes the role of a Trainer whose goal is to capture and use the creatures' special abilities to combat other Pokémon. Some Pokémon can transform into stronger species through a process called evolution via various means, such as exposure to specific items. Each Pokémon has one or two elemental types, which define its advantages and disadvantages when battling other Pokémon. A major goal in each game is to complete the Pokédex, a comprehensive Pokémon encyclopedia, by capturing, evolving, and trading with other Trainers to obtain individuals from all Pokémon species.

When designing the 2013 sequels Pokémon X and Y, Director Junichi Masuda chose the three main themes to be beauty, bonds and evolution. More focus than usual was placed on giving new Pokémon unique elements for this generation. A major design change for the franchise was the shift from two-dimensional sprites to three-dimensional polygons. During the development for the games, emphasis was placed on retaining the iconic style of Pokémon art director Ken Sugimori, who has been designing Pokémon and creating the franchise's official artwork since Red and Green. Sugimori then draws the finalized art of each species so they had a uniform presentation. Malamar and its pre-evolution, Inkay, were created by manga artist Hitoshi Ariga, who had been requested to assist in creating Pokémon for X and Y.

=== Design ===
Standing 4 feet 11 inches (150 cm) tall, Malamar resembles an upside-down squid in design. It is psychic, and is considered one of the strongest hypnotists among Pokémon species. It uses its lights on its body to hypnotize prey before using digestive fluids to consume them. The Pokémon anime series frequently depicts Malamar as generally malicious in nature. In-game, to evolve an Inkay into Malamar, players must flip their Nintendo 3DS or Switch consoles upside-down, while in spin-off mobile game Pokémon Go, a player's phone must be flipped upside-down to evolve it. Malamar's name is derived from "mal", a Spanish word meaning "bad". Its Japanese name similarly contains the syllable "ma", which is Japanese for demon.

When Ariga designed Inkay and Malamar, the former was made to resemble a more familiar, friendly-looking squid, and a baby version of Malamar. Meanwhile, Malamar's design was meant to reflect how squids are often portrayed in encyclopedias and similar, with their legs upward. The upside-down design was also meant as a hint for players to figure out how to evolve Inkay into Malamar. To further this correlation, Ariga gave Game Freak's development team sketches of Inkay flipping about as it waited for instruction from the player, to make flipping a part of its identity. He liked the idea of stimulating children's minds in this manner, citing how the Pokémon Parasect's introduction in the first games introduced them to the concept of cordyceps.

The later series title Pokémon Legends: Z-A introduced a new form for Malamar dubbed Mega Malamar, a temporary transformation that greatly increases a species' power. Now standing 9 ft 6 in (290 cm) tall, Mega Malamar has a significantly larger brain, which grants it stronger hypnotic abilities. These abilities let Malamar rewrite people's personalities and memories, changing them into completely different people if it wishes.

== Appearances ==
Malamar debuted in 2013's Pokémon X and Y. It would subsequently appear in the 2017 games Pokémon Ultra Sun and Ultra Moon, the 2019 games Pokémon Sword and Shield, the 2022 games Pokémon Scarlet and Violet's 2023 DLC expansion The Hidden Treasure of Area Zero, and in the 2025 game Pokémon Legends: Z-A. Malamar also appears in Pokémon Go and in the Pokémon Trading Card Game.

In the Pokémon anime series, a group of Malamar act as recurring antagonists in the seventeenth season titled Pokémon the Series: XY. A single member of this group first attempted to hypnotize people and Pokémon into aiding it in world domination, but this plot was foiled by series protagonist Ash Ketchum and his friends. A trio of them later attempt to use energy crystals to cause global disruption, but the characters Clemont, Meowth, James, and James's Inkay are able to cause the crystals to merge into one, foiling their plan. The Malamar escaped into the crystal, promising to return in a future time. A Malamar is later used by recurring character Alain in Pokémon Journeys: The Series, where it is defeated in battle by the character Leon.

In the lead up to Pokémon Legends: Z-A, a marketing blitz dubbed "My Friend Malamar" was held by The Pokémon Company to reveal Mega Malamar, with trailers depicting characters in the games' universe being hypnotized into admiring it and loving it.

== Critical reception ==
Mega Malamar's design has been described as a Lovecraftian Eldritch horror.

Pokémon Sun and Moon director Shigeru Ohmori stated in an interview he considered Malamar his favorite Pokémon due to how it evolved from Inkay, and led to similar ideas in his own games. Connor Christie of Pocket Tactics considered it one of the best Pokémon introduced in X and Y, stating that while the franchise wasn't afraid of using "convoluted methods" to evolve Pokémon, "few are more mind-bending than that of Malamar". He further praised its design, in both how its upside-down squid appearance played into its evolution method, but also that its constantly annoyed look had "a certain energy that everyone can relate to at times".

Zack Zwiezen of Kotaku stated that Malamar reflected his feelings on squids as a whole, which he considered fascinating due to how "strange and cool" they were, but also creeped out by their intelligence and how dangerous they could be. He further felt its lore painted it as one of the franchise's most dangerous Pokémon due to its hypnotic power, and in-game statements that it altered the course of history within the Pokémon franchise's universe. Alyse Stanley and Jhaan Elker of The Washington Post felt Malamar's character design as an upside-down squid was clever. They further suggested that it could be seen as meta commentary that the player themselves had been manipulated by it to evolve Inkay due to its unique evolution method.

Timothy Blake Donohoo of Comic Book Resources stated that Malamar's "idiosyncratic transformation, type and design belie a Pokémon who harbors immense powers", and cited how it was portrayed as using them for evil. While he felt their behavior in multiple instances indicated a possible genetic predilection for a misanthropic mindset, its name in both regions did too, with its North American name utilized the Spanish word for bad, mal, it's Japanese named utilized the syllable ma, meaning demon. Meanwhile, Screen Rant's Carlyle Edmundson felt their portrayal in the anime helped indicate how dangerous actual evil Pokémon in the series could be, which she considered a terrifying concept within the scope of the series. Meanwhile, the staff of Chinese magazine Gamer also discussed Malamar's role in the XY anime series, seeing them as a surprise villain that caused a great deal of trouble before disappearing abruptly from the series. This led them to belief the character may have been planned for further use in a special episode of alongside series villains Team Flare, however they were disappointed to see the storyline appeared to have been instead forgotten.

Polygon's Patricia Hernandez described her reaction to its Mega evolution as "it almost feels like peering into the abyss". Further calling it less similar to a squid and more an Eldritch horror, it managed to magnify the Pokémon's existing tendencies while resembling a cross between Lovecraftian nightmare and the Pokémon franchise's Ultra Beast designs introduced in Sun and Moon, "except with rainbows". Giovanni Colantonio also for Polygon stated they had always hated Malamar's design due to it making them uncomfortable for reasons they could not quite identify, suggesting "the fact that it's a sea monster with a beak" may be the cause, even while acknowledging squids have beaks. By comparison, he considered Mega Malamar an improvement due to its "ribbon-like limbs and its bright rainbow colors", and felt it bore a resemblance to the DreamWorks Pictures character Megamind, though was unsure if that made the design better or worse.

Catherine Lewis of GamesRadar+ on the other hand poked fun at the promotional campaign to reveal it, suggesting it would have been funny if it had been for something unrelated instead and just an effort to get people to like what she described as one of the weirdest Pokémon from X and Y. She further felt there was something deeply sad about its use of mass hypnosis to make people want to be its friend.
