= List of generation VI Pokémon =

The international logo for the Pokémon franchise

The sixth generation (Generation VI) of the Pokémon franchise features 72 fictional species of creatures introduced to the core video game series in the 2013 Nintendo 3DS games Pokémon X and Y. Some Pokémon in this generation were introduced in animated adaptations of the franchise before X and Y. This generation featured the series' largest graphical overhaul: a shift from two-dimensional sprites to three-dimensional polygons. A new type (Fairy) was introduced for the first time since Gold and Silver in 1999, bringing the total to 18. Greater emphasis was placed on making Pokémon species more unique and in-tune with the culture and fauna of Europe, namely France.

All Pokémon were created by a team of roughly 20 artists, led by Ken Sugimori and Hironobu Yoshida. For the first time in the franchise, the generation's legendary Pokémon—specifically Xerneas and Yveltal—were not designed by Sugimori alone; he requested the help of Atsuko Nishida to move their designs forward.

The following list details the 72 Pokémon of Generation VI in order of their National Pokédex number. The first Pokémon, Chespin, is number 650 and the last, Volcanion, is number 721. Alternate forms that result in type changes and Mega Evolutions are included for convenience.

== Design and development ==
Pokémon are a species of fictional creatures created for the Pokémon media franchise. Developed by Game Freak and published by Nintendo, the Japanese franchise began in 1996 with the video games Pokémon Red and Green for the Game Boy, which were later released in North America as Pokémon Red and Blue in 1998. In these games and their sequels, the player assumes the role of a Trainer whose goal is to capture and use the creatures' special abilities to combat other Pokémon. Some Pokémon can transform into stronger species through a process called evolution via various means, such as exposure to specific items. Each Pokémon have one or two elemental types, which define its advantages and disadvantages when battling other Pokémon. A major goal in each game is to complete the Pokédex, a comprehensive Pokémon encyclopedia, by capturing, evolving, and trading with other Trainers to obtain individuals from all Pokémon species.

Development of Pokémon X and Y began in 2010 and the games were released worldwide on October 12, 2013. Director Junichi Masuda stated the three main themes of the games to be beauty, bonds and evolution. Beauty was the core focus and Masuda felt France to be a prime example of such; he brought a team to the country for study in 2011. With the games taking place in a region based on France (called Kalos), design inspiration stemmed more from European culture (e.g. the legendary trio of Xerneas, Yveltal and Zygarde have their roots in Norse mythology). More focus than usual was placed on giving new Pokémon unique elements for this generation.

A major design change for the franchise was the shift from two-dimensional sprites to three-dimensional polygons. This required a larger development team than past games, with more than 500 people involved with the games' development, inclusive of localization teams. Emphasis was placed on retaining the iconic style of Pokémon art director Ken Sugimori who has been designing Pokémon and creating the franchise's official artwork since Red and Green in 1996. A new type was also added into the game for the first time since Gold and Silver in 1999: Fairy type. This type was introduced to balance out the Dragon, Fighting, Poison, and Steel types. Dragon was previously only weak against itself and Ice, and only resisted against Steel. Fighting previously was super-effective against five different types (Normal, Ice, Rock, Dark and Steel) and only weak against Flying and Psychic types. Poison was previously only super-effective against Grass, resisted against itself, Rock, Ground and Ghost types and ineffective against Steel. Steel previously was only super-effective against Ice and Rock types and resisted against itself, Fire, Water and Electric types. Aside from this, Ghost and Dark are now neutral against Steel, improving the offensive usefulness of both types. Multiple Pokémon from previous generations, such as Jigglypuff, Gardevoir, and Marill, were retroactively assigned the new type while 13 new Pokémon, most notably Sylveon, donned the type. A new mechanic called Mega Evolution—a temporary form change akin to normal evolution—was also added for more dynamic battles and stemmed from the concepts of bonds and evolution. Mega Evolutions "refined designs to a new extreme" according to Yoshida and required considerable effort. They were made temporary to retain balance in battles and only made possible when a Pokémon is holding their respective Mega Stone to prevent players from giving them a different advantageous hold item. A variant of Mega Evolution called "Primal Reversion" was introduced in Omega Ruby and Alpha Sapphire; this mechanic is exclusive to the legendary Pokémon Groudon and Kyogre.

The titles X and Y, representing the x-axis and y-axis—also reflecting different forms of thinking—were chosen early in development. The simplicity of the names was also related to the simultaneous worldwide release of the games. Designers additionally sought to make the Pokémon names the same in every country whenever possible. Masuda expressed that this effort proved exceptionally difficult as the names have to feel fitting to their physical appearance and not infringe upon any rights. At the request of Masuda, the shapes "X" and "Y" were used as the framework for the boxart legendary Pokémon: Xerneas and Yveltal. Normally, Sugimori designs the legendary Pokémon by himself; however, he required assistance from designer Atsuko Nishida to create Xerneas and Yveltal. Finalization of their designs took about 18 months, 3 times longer than normal. Manga artist Hitoshi Ariga was requested to assist in creating Pokémon for X and Y; Ariga ultimately designed ten species for the games. It is speculated by fans that the designs for the Chespin, Fennekin and Froakie evolutionary lines stem from typical role-playing game character classes, such as those in Final Fantasy. Chespin represents the knight, paladin and fighter classes; Fennekin represents the witch, mage and magician classes; and Froakie represents the ninja, thief and rogue classes.

== List of Pokémon ==
List of Pokémon species introduced in Generation VI (2013) (Note: Details on Pokémon names, National Pokédex numbers, types and evolutions are obtained from The Pokémon Company International's online Pokédex.)
Name (Note: English and Japanese name, as well as National Pokédex number)	Type(s)	Evolves from	Evolves into	Notes
Chespin Harimaron (ハリマロン) (0650)	Grass	—N/a	Quilladin (#651)	Chespin are small creatures that can harden the quills on their head to smash rocks. Its design is based on a chestnut and a hedgehog. In the anime, Chespin was the first Grass-type starter to never be captured by Ash Ketchum, followed by Grookey.
Quilladin Haribōgu (ハリボーグ) (0651)	Grass	Chespin (#650)	Chesnaught (#652)	Quilladin is a kind species that has a tough shell of armour. Upon Quilladin's reveal prior to the release of X and Y, fans expressed distaste for its wrecking-ball-like design. Its design has elements of a pinecone and a squirrel.
Chesnaught Burigaron (ブリガロン) (0652)	Grass / Fighting	Quilladin (#651)	Mega Evolution	Chesnaught are powerful hedgehog Pokémon capable of moving tanks and withstanding explosions. It is based on Glyptodon.
Fennekin Fokko (フォッコ) (0653)	Fire	—N/a	Braixen (#654)	Fennekin are fox-like Pokémon whose ears can heat the air to 200 °C (390 °F). Its design is based on the fennec fox.
Braixen Tērunā (テールナー) (0654)	Fire	Fennekin (#653)	Delphox (#655)	Braixen are fox-like Pokémon that use a flaming twig stored in their tail-fur to battle. Its English name is a portmanteau of "braise" and "vixen". Braixen is also a playable character in Pokkén Tournament.
Delphox Mafokushī (マフォクシー) (0655)	Fire / Psychic	Braixen (#654)	Mega Evolution	Delphox are fox-esque Pokémon that have psychic abilities and are capable of creating 3,000 °C (5,400 °F) flames.
Froakie Keromatsu (ケロマツ) (0656)	Water	—N/a	Frogadier (#657)	Froakie are frog-esque Pokémon that can secrete defensive bubbles from their back and neck.
Frogadier Gekogashira (ゲコガシラ) (0657)	Water	Froakie (#656)	Greninja (#658)	Frogadier are agile, frog-esque Pokémon said to be capable of climbing a 610 m (2,000 ft) building in a minute. Its English name is a portmanteau of "frog" and "brigadier".
Greninja Gekkōga (ゲッコウガ) (0658)	Water / Dark	Frogadier (#657)	Mega Evolution	As a ninja frog Pokémon, Greninja are able to create shurikens from water that can slice metal. Greninja that have the ability 'Battle Bond' are capable of transforming into 'Ash-Greninja' (a form of Greninja based on the change that occurs in the Pokémon XY anime series that happens whenever Ash's Greninja has a strong connection with Ash). As of Generation 7 this transformation could be triggered in-game by attaining a Greninja with the ability battle bond, by completing the demo for Pokémon Sun and Moon. Greninja was designed by Yusuke Ohmura. Greninja's name is a portmanteau of the French word for frog (grenouille) and "ninja". Greninja's design has been well received by fans and critics alike. In a 2016 poll, Greninja was voted as the most popular Pokémon in Japan. In the 2020 Pokémon of the Year Poll run by Google, Greninja was the most voted Pokémon in the world. It is also a playable character in the crossover fighting game Super Smash Bros. for 3DS and Wii U and Super Smash Bros. Ultimate.
Bunnelby Horubī (ホルビー) (0659)	Normal	—N/a	Diggersby (#660)	Bunnelby are rabbit-esque Pokémon that use their large ears as shovels to dig burrows. Their ears are extremely strong and cannot break. Bunnelby's design is inspired by the local wildlife of France.
Diggersby Horūdo (ホルード) (0660)	Normal / Ground	Bunnelby (#659)	—N/a	Diggersby are rabbit-esque Pokémon that are said to be as powerful as an excavator and can lift boulders weighing one ton with their ears. They are popular with construction workers.
Fletchling Yayakoma (ヤヤコマ) (0661)	Normal / Flying	—N/a	Fletchinder (#662)	Fletchling are small robin Pokémon that are known for being both friendly and fiercely territorial. Fletchling is the standard early-game Flying-type Pokémon.
Fletchinder Hinoyakoma (ヒノヤコマ) (0662)	Fire / Flying	Fletchling (#661)	Talonflame (#663)	Fletchinder have a flame sac on their undersides that, when heated, allow them to fly faster. It is the first regional bird Pokémon to not be Normal/Flying in typing.
Talonflame Faiarō (ファイアロー) (0663)	Fire / Flying	Fletchinder (#662)	—N/a	Talonflame are falcon Pokémon, and are capable of flying at speeds of 500 km/h (310 mph) while attacking prey. During the Generation VI era (2013–2016), Talonflame was one of the most-used Pokémon in competitions. It proved incredibly useful in the "hyper-offensive" Pokémon Video Game Championships and appeared on just over 41 percent of Winter 2014 teams. The entire metagame shifted in order to counter Talonflame, with most players adding dedicated strategies to taking it down. Later iterations of the game nerfed Talonflame, culminating with Sun and Moon adding multiple counters to the Pokémon.
Scatterbug Kofukimushi (コフキムシ) (0664)	Bug	—N/a	Spewpa (#665)	Scatterbug cover themselves in protective powder that allow them to regulate their body temperature and survive in any climate.
Spewpa Kofūrai (コフーライ) (0665)	Bug	Scatterbug (#664)	Vivillon (#666)	Spewpa are meek, live in the shadows, and have strong bodies. It appears as an assist Poké Ball Pokémon in Super Smash Bros. for Nintendo 3DS and Super Smash Bros. for Wii U and Super Smash Bros. Ultimate.
Vivillon Bibiyon (ビビヨン) (0666)	Bug / Flying	Spewpa (#665)	—N/a	Vivillon's wings feature 18 different patterns that are dependent upon the player's real-world location (determined by their user settings on the Nintendo 3DS). A special Poké Ball-pattern Vivillon was released at the Pokémon Center in Paris on 4 June 2014, and then worldwide on 6 August 2014, in commemoration of the launch of the franchise's online store. Its 20th pattern, the Fancy Pattern, was released on 7 July 2014, as a commemoration for 100 million trades through the game's Global Trade System. This form was later available to catch in Pokémon Scarlet and Violet.
Litleo Shishiko (シシコ) (0667)	Fire / Normal	—N/a	Pyroar (#668)	Litleo is a lion cub Pokémon. It is hot-blooded and its short mane gets hot when angered or excited.
Pyroar Kaenjishi (カエンジシ) (0668)	Fire / Normal	Litleo (#667)	Mega Evolution	Male Pyroar feature a large lion's mane, while female Pyroar have a long ponytail mane. Pyroar was regarded as "majestic" and "cool", particularly its male variant, and has been well received. Its Mega Evolution however has received criticism for its mane.
Flabébé Furabebe (フラベベ) (0669)	Fairy	—N/a	Floette (#670)	Flabébé are tiny—only 10 cm (4 in) tall—carefree, humanoid Pokémon that cling to a flower for their whole life. Along with the rest of its line, it has five forms depending on where it is found, Red, Yellow, Orange, Blue, and White Flower.
Floette Furaette (フラエッテ) (0670)	Fairy	Flabébé (#669)	Florges (#671); Mega Evolution (Note: Only Eternal Flower Floette can Mega Evolve.)	Floette is a Pokémon that has five different forms depending on the colour of the flower it holds: Red, Yellow, Orange, Blue, and White Flower. A unique Floette, known as Eternal Flower Floette, holding a black-and-red flower, belongs to the character AZ. Its colour scheme resembles the French flag and it can learn the move Light of Ruin. This unique form has never been released officially until Pokémon Legends: Z-A.
Florges Furājesu (フラージェス) (0671)	Fairy	Floette (#670)	—N/a	It claims flower gardens as its territory, and it obtains power from basking in the energy emitted by flowering plants. The petal blizzards that Florges triggers are overwhelming in their beauty and power. It has five forms like the rest of its line.
Skiddo Mēkuru (メェークル) (0672)	Grass	—N/a	Gogoat (#673)	Skiddo is an ibex Pokémon with leaves on its back. It is thought to be one of the first Pokémon to live in harmony with humans and is quite friendly.
Gogoat Gōgōto (ゴーゴート) (0673)	Grass	Skiddo (#672)	—N/a	Gogoat is a grass-covered goat Pokémon that can be mounted for travel. Gogoat are popular with people and are used to travel around Kalos, including Lumiose City.
Pancham Yanchamu (ヤンチャム) (0674)	Fighting	—N/a	Pangoro (#675)	Pancham's design is heavily based on panda cubs. It chooses a Pangoro as its master and then imitates its master's actions.
Pangoro Goronda (ゴロンダ) (0675)	Fighting / Dark	Pancham (#674)	—N/a	Pangoro was designed by Hitoshi Ariga. Pangoro is a cantankerous Pokémon, but it has a strong heart and does not forgive those who pick on the weak. Its design may be based on Japanese delinquents.
Furfrou Torimian (トリミアン) (0676)	Normal	No evolution		Furfrou are poodle Pokémon. Furfrou have ten forms, all of which are obtained by getting them trimmed at Pokémon groomers. Trimming its fluffy fur not only makes it more elegant but also increases the swiftness of its movements. In Pokémon Go, different forms are available based on different regions.
Espurr Nyasupā (ニャスパー) (0677)	Psychic	—N/a	Meowstic (#678)	Espurr are Scottish Fold-like Pokémon. Its face never changes expression due to it being constantly focused on holding in its psychic energy.
Meowstic Nyaonikusu (ニャオニクス) (0678)	Psychic	Espurr (#677)	Mega Evolution	There are two different versions of Meowstic depending on their gender. Both forms have different stat distributions and moves. Male Meowstic is more defensive, while female Meowstic is more offensive.
Honedge Hitotsuki (ヒトツキ) (0679)	Steel / Ghost	—N/a	Doublade (#680)	Honedge was designed by Hitoshi Ariga. It takes the appearance of a cursed sword and its sheath. It will take your soul if you try to grab its hilt.
Doublade Nidangiru (ニダンギル) (0680)	Steel / Ghost	Honedge (#679)	Aegislash (#681)	When Honedge evolves, it divides into two swords, which cooperate via telepathy to coordinate attacks and slash their enemies to ribbons. Doublade was designed by Hitoshi Ariga.
Aegislash Girugarudo (ギルガルド) (0681)	Steel / Ghost	Doublade (#680)	—N/a	Aegislash has two different forms: Shield Form and Blade Form. Its special ability Stance Change allows it to switch forms depending on if it has selected an attack or a support move. It also has a signature move called King's Shield, which protects the user while deficiting Pokémon that make physical contact while this shield was active. Aegislash was designed by Hitoshi Ariga. Aegislash is playable in the Switch version of Pokkén Tournament.
Spritzee Shushupu (シュシュプ) (0682)	Fairy	—N/a	Aromatisse (#683)	Spritzee's beak is reminiscent of masks worn by plague doctors. It emits a scent that enraptures those who smell it. This fragrance changes depending on what it has eaten. In the past, rather than using perfume, royal ladies carried a Spritzee that would waft a fragrance they liked.
Aromatisse Furefuwan (フレフワン) (0683)	Fairy	Spritzee (#682)	—N/a	Aromatisse is the evolution of Spritzee that resembles a flamenco dancer. It has received mixed reception with GamesRadar describing Aromatisse as "a weird hybrid of Jynx and Jigglypuff."
Swirlix Peroppafu (ペロッパフ) (0684)	Fairy	—N/a	Slurpuff (#685)	Swirlix is a small dog-like Pokémon that eats nothing but sweets, which make its fur as sticky and sweet as cotton candy.
Slurpuff Perorīmu (ペロリーム) (0685)	Fairy	Swirlix (#684)	—N/a	Slurpuff resembles a mix of a Bichon Frisé and a creampuff. It can distinguish the faintest of scents and puts its sensitive sense of smell to use by helping pastry chefs in the kitchen.
Inkay Māīka (マーイーカ) (0686)	Dark / Psychic	—N/a	Malamar (#687)	Both Inkay and Malamar were designed by Hitoshi Ariga. Inkay requires a unique condition for it to evolve into Malamar: the player must turn their Nintendo 3DS, smartphone (in Pokémon Go), or Switch (during handheld mode) upside down once Inkay reaches level 30.
Malamar Karamanero (カラマネロ) (0687)	Dark / Psychic	Inkay (#686)	Mega Evolution	Both Malamar and its pre-evolution, Inkay, were designed by Hitoshi Ariga. Being described as having an incredibly powerful hypnotic ability and an evil nature, it is said that Malamar's hypnotic powers played a role in certain history-changing events.
Binacle Kametete (カメテテ) (0688)	Rock / Water	—N/a	Barbaracle (#689)	Binacle is a pair of twin goose barnacles that resemble hands. its name is a play on "barnacle" and "binnacle". They feed on seaweed that washes onto shore during high tides.
Barbaracle Gamenodesu (ガメノデス) (0689)	Rock / Water	Binacle (#688)	Mega Evolution	When they evolve, two Binacle multiply into seven. Barbaracle gains a bipedal form and a head in the shape of a fist.
Skrelp Kuzumō (クズモー) (0690)	Poison / Water	—N/a	Dragalge (#691)	Camouflaged as rotten kelp, Skrelp spray liquid poison on prey that approaches unawares and then finishes them off. Skrelp is based on the common seadragon.
Dragalge Doramidoro (ドラミドロ) (0691)	Poison / Dragon	Skrelp (#690)	Mega Evolution	Dragalge is based on the leafy seadragon. Tales are told of ships that wander into seas where Dragalge live, never to return.
Clauncher Udeppō (ウデッポウ) (0692)	Water	—N/a	Clawitzer (#693)	Clauncher is based on the pistol shrimp. The meat inside its claws is popular as a delicacy in Galar.
Clawitzer Burosutā (ブロスター) (0693)	Water	Clauncher (#692)	—N/a	Clawitzer is a shrimp-like Pokémon with a massive draconic claw that is also based on a howitzer. After using the feelers on its oversized claw to detect the location of prey, Clawitzer launches a cannonball of water at its target.
Helioptile Erikiteru (エリキテル) (0694)	Electric / Normal	—N/a	Heliolisk (#695)	The frills on either side of Helioptile's head have cells that generate electricity when exposed to sunlight. It is based on the frilled lizard.
Heliolisk Erezādo (エレザード) (0695)	Electric / Normal	Helioptile (#694)	—N/a	A single Heliolisk can generate sufficient electricity to power a skyscraper by flaring its frills.
Tyrunt Chigorasu (チゴラス) (0696)	Rock / Dragon	—N/a	Tyrantrum (#697)	Tyrunt was designed by Hitoshi Ariga. It is a Fossil Pokémon that must be revived to be obtained. Tyrunt is selfish and likes to be pampered. It can also inflict grievous wounds on its Trainer just by playing around.
Tyrantrum Gachigorasu (ガチゴラス) (0697)	Rock / Dragon	Tyrunt (#696)	—N/a	Tyrantrum was designed by Hitoshi Ariga. Its design is based on the Tyrannosaurus rex. This Pokémon was the king of the ancient world. Its massive jaws can shred cars to pieces.
Amaura Amarusu (アマルス) (0698)	Rock / Ice	—N/a	Aurorus (#699)	It was designed by Hitoshi Ariga. It is a small, sauropod-like FoPokémon. Specimens of this species can sometimes be found frozen in ice.
Aurorus Amaruruga (アマルルガ) (0699)	Rock / Ice	Amaura (#698)	—N/a	Designed by Hitoshi Ariga, its design draws inspiration from the Amargasaurus, which had a row of spines extending down its neck. However, Aurorus has a shining trail of northern lights.
Sylveon Ninfia (ニンフィア) (0700)	Fairy	Eevee (#133)	—N/a	Sylveon is an evolution of the first generation Pokémon Eevee. Sylveon was designed for the sixth generation of Pokémon in order to promote the newly added Fairy typing by adding a new Eeveelution to match. During its initial reveal, its type was not stated, causing fans to speculate that it could be a Normal type or new "Light" type. It was designed by Atsuko Nishida, who says she designed it to be a different take on a fairy as compared to the more typical humanoid representations. Following its addition, the previous Eeveelutions also had their designs slightly adjusted to fit with Sylveon. According to Junichi Masuda, Sylveon was the very first Fairy-type Pokémon to be added in-game, and it was also the first to be revealed to the public. Sylveon has a pink, white, and blue color scheme, with long rabbit-like ears, large blue eyes, and several bows donning its appearance. The ribbons from these bows are actually feelers that emit an aura that soothes people and Pokémon around it. It uses these feelers to wrap around its trainer while walking with them, which allows it to read and stabilize their emotions. Sylveon has proven to be popular among fans of the series, including among the transgender community. Drag queen Nymphia Wind is named after Sylveon's Japanese name.
Hawlucha Ruchaburu (ルチャブル) (0701)	Fighting / Flying	—N/a	Mega Evolution	Hawlucha's design is inspired by luchadors. Its design has received praise for being creative. It is a prideful, skilled fighter and will always strike an exciting pose before attacking. It is exclusively found in Mexico in Pokémon Go.
Dedenne Dedenne (デデンネ) (0702)	Electric / Fairy	No evolution		Since Dedenne cannot generate much electricity on its own, it steals electricity from outlets or other electric Pokémon. It is based on gerbils and communication antennae.
Carbink Mereshī (メレシー) (0703)	Rock / Fairy	No evolution		Although Carbink has no evolution in-game, the species canonically can transform into Diancie under certain, unspecified circumstances.
Goomy Numera (ヌメラ) (0704)	Dragon	—N/a	Sliggoo (#705)	Goomy's "goofy" design earned it unusual popularity and spawned a meme: "The Church of Goomy". It is considered among the cuter (though in an eccentric manner) Pokémon introduced in Generation VI.
Sliggoo Numeiru (ヌメイル) (0705)	Dragon	Goomy (#704)	Goodra (#706)	Sliggoo's four horns serve as a highly adept radar system since it cannot see. It is not very bright and prefers to flee a battle than to fight. It evolves into Goodra at level 50 but only while it is raining. In Pokémon Legends: Arceus, it was given a Dragon/Steel Hisuian Form based on snails.
Goodra Numerugon (ヌメルゴン) (0706)	Dragon	Sliggoo (#705)	—N/a	Goodra is mainly based on the Lou Carcolh, a mythical serpent/mollusc creature from French folklore. Alternatively, it could be based on the yōkai called Shussebora, meaning "ascended trumpet shell", which is a trumpet shell snail that lives 1,000 years in the mountains, 1,000 on the plains and 1,000 at sea, and will then ascend and turn into a dragon. In Pokémon Legends: Arceus, it was given a Dragon/Steel Hisuian Form based on snails.
Klefki Kureffi (クレッフィ) (0707)	Steel / Fairy	No evolution		Klefki was designed by Pokémon graphic designer Mana Ibe and inspired by "old mansions and secret keys". It may also be at least partially inspired by the Japanese yōkai Tsukumogami, household objects that gain souls. Video game journalists regarded its design as among the worst of new Pokémon introduced in X and Y and characterized the design as uninspired, insipid and strange. IGN readers voted Klefki as the ninth-worst Pokémon from Pokémon X and Y with Justin Davis joking that it was created when a designer lost his keys. Kassandra Khaw of USGamer expressed annoyance that Klefki was so useful in competitive Pokémon play due to how "sloppily designed" she found it to be. GameRevolution claimed that Klefki is their favourite Pokémon despite the criticism that it has received. The A.V. Club stated that they found Klefki's simplicity amusing. Kyle Hilliard of Game Informer claimed that Klefki is his favourite Pokémon in Pokémon Sun and Moon, but described it as the weirdest Pokémon ever. In Pokémon Go, Klefki is exclusively found in France.
Phantump Bokurē (ボクレー) (0708)	Ghost / Grass	—N/a	Trevenant (#709)	Phantump is based on the Kodama, a spirit in Japanese folklore that inhabits trees. According to folklore, these Pokémon are the souls of lost children trapped in long dead stumps.
Trevenant Ōrotto (オーロット) (0709)	Ghost / Grass	Phantump (#708)	—N/a	Trevenant is said to devour anyone daring to ravage the forest. To the creatures dwelling in the forest, it offers great kindness. It is able to control entire forests through its root system.
Pumpkaboo Bakeccha (バケッチャ) (0710)	Ghost / Grass	—N/a	Gourgeist (#711)	Pumpkaboo is based on jack-o'-lanterns. It can be found in four different sizes. The larger the Pumpkaboo, the higher the stats it will have.
Gourgeist Panpujin (パンプジン) (0711)	Ghost / Grass	Pumpkaboo (#710)	—N/a	In the darkness of a new-moon night, Gourgeist will come knocking. Whoever answers the door will be swept off to the afterlife. Like Pumpkaboo, it can be found in many sizes.
Bergmite Kachikōru (カチコール) (0712)	Ice	—N/a	Avalugg (#713)	Using air of -150 °F (equivalent to -101 °C in British English), Bergmite freeze opponents solid. They live in herds above the snow line on mountains.
Avalugg Kurebēsu (クレベース) (0713)	Ice	Bergmite (#712)	—N/a	Avalugg's ice-covered body is as hard as steel. Its cumbersome frame crushes anything that stands in its way. It is based on icebergs and battle ships, and has a habit of drifting in open water. In Pokémon Legends: Arceus, it was given a Hisuian Form.
Noibat Onbatto (オンバット) (0714)	Flying / Dragon	—N/a	Noivern (#715)	Fruits are Noibat's favorite foods, so it picks out ripe ones using its sonar. Its English name is a portmanteau of "noise" and "bat".
Noivern Onbān (オンバーン) (0715)	Flying / Dragon	Noibat (#714)	—N/a	Noivern weakens enemies with ultrasonic waves that could crush stone before finishing them off with its fangs. Its English name is a portmanteau of "noise" and "wyvern", the latter of which is the inspiration for Noivern's design.
Xerneas Zeruneasu (ゼルネアス) (0716)	Fairy	No evolution		As the game mascot of Pokémon X, Xerneas represents eternity and is known in Kalosian mythology as "the one who gives". It can invigorate humans and other Pokémon with life energy, and maintains the balance between life and death alongside Yveltal. Xerneas' design is inspired by the Eikþyrnir of Norse mythology, a stag that stands atop Valhalla. It is able to lie dormant as a large tree for 1,000 years to regain its powers after exhausting them. It changes automatically between two forms, whose differences are purely esthetic: Neutral Mode (outside of battle) and Active Mode (during battles).
Yveltal Iberutaru (イベルタル) (0717)	Dark / Flying	No evolution		As the game mascot of Pokémon Y, Yveltal is a creature of destruction known in Kalosian mythology as "the one who takes". It is capable of absorbing the life energy of other living beings, and maintains the balance between life and death alongside Xerneas. Yveltal's design is inspired by the Hræsvelgr of Norse mythology, a giant eagle able to make the wind blow by flapping its wings. At the end of its life span, it absorbs the life force of everything within roughly 50m and enters a restorative cocoon phase for 1,000 years.
Zygarde Jigarude (ジガルデ) (0718)	Dragon / Ground	—N/a	Mega Evolution	Zygarde's design is inspired by the Jörmungandr of Norse mythology, a dragon that encircles Midgard. Zygarde normally appears as blob-like Zygarde Cores, which individually absorb the immobile Zygarde Cells to assume the canine 10% Forme or the serpentine 50% Forme. Zygarde Cores can also combine with every Zygarde Cell to assume its humanoid Complete Forme. This form only appears to neutralize threats to the ecosystem, and is capable of overpowering Xerneas and Yveltal. At its introduction in the sixth generation, its signature move was Land's Wrath; the seventh generation also gave Zygarde three other signature moves: Thousand Arrows, Thousand Waves, and Core Enforcer.
Diancie Dianshī (ディアンシー) (0719)	Rock / Fairy	—N/a	Mega Evolution	Said to be "the loveliest sight in the whole world", Diancie are mutated Carbink capable of creating diamonds at will. As a Mythical Pokémon, Diancie is not readily found in-game and is only available through Nintendo distributions. It was originally discovered by hackers on 26 October 2013 and not officially revealed by Game Freak until 11 February 2014. Diancie is the only Pokémon capable of learning the move Diamond Storm. When Diancie uses this move, it whips up a storm of diamonds to attack the target. Diancie can also Mega Evolve with the Diancite.
Hoopa Fūpa (フーパ) (0720)	Psychic / Ghost	No evolution		"Hoopa Confined" are small, mischievous Pokémon that are capable warping space. As a Mythical Pokémon, Hoopa is not readily found in-game and is only available through Nintendo distributions. It was originally discovered by hackers on 26 October 2013 and not officially revealed by Game Freak until 11 January 2015. Hoopa Confined is the only Pokémon able to learn Hyperspace Hole, and as of Scarlet and Violet, can only be used while in this form.
Hoopa Fūpa (フーパ) (0720)	Psychic / Dark	No evolution		Using the Prison Bottle item, Confined Hoopa can transform into a considerably larger and more powerful form called "Hoopa Unbound". Known as the Djinn Pokémon, it is capable of seizing any object in the world and can teleport anything through space. This form is capable of using the move Hyperspace Fury.
Volcanion Borukenion (ボルケニオン) (0721)	Fire / Water	No evolution		As a unique dual Fire and Water-type Pokémon, Volcanion are able to create scalding steam within their body and expel it with enough force to destroy mountains. Volcanion is the only Pokémon capable of learning the move Steam Eruption, which immerses the target in superheated steam and can burn the target. As a Mythical Pokémon, Volcanion is not readily found in-game and is only available through Nintendo distributions. It was originally discovered by hackers on 26 October 2013 and not officially revealed by Game Freak until 14 December 2015.

=== Mega-Evolved Forms ===
List of Mega-Evolved Forms introduced in Generation VI (2013)
Name	Type(s)	Evolves from	Evolves into	Notes
Mega Venusaur Mega Fushigibana (メガフシギバナ) (0003)	Grass / Poison	Venusaur (#003)	—N/a	Mega Venusaur is the Mega Evolved form of Venusaur, a Pokémon that first appeared in the 1996 games Pokémon Red and Blue. In order to support the massive flower it has, its back legs have become stronger. The flower is said to take on vivid colors if it gets plenty of nutrition and sunlight.
Mega Charizard Mega Rizādon (メガリザードン) (0006)	Fire	Charizard (#006)	—N/a	Mega Charizard X and Y are the Mega Evolved forms of Charizard, a Pokémon that first appeared in the 1996 games Pokémon Red and Blue. Charizard obtained two Mega Evolutions in X and Y, which were made version-exclusive to promote interaction and trading between players.
Mega Charizard Mega Rizādon (メガリザードン) (0006)	Fire / Dragon	Charizard (#006)	—N/a	Mega Charizard X's black-and-blue body is the result of the power of Mega Evolution. In this form, Charizard has the Fire-Dragon typing.
Mega Charizard Mega Rizādon (メガリザードン) (0006)	Fire / Flying	Charizard (#006)	—N/a	Mega Charizard Y's bond with its trainer is apparently the source of its power. At max speed, it is fast enough to surpass a fighter jet.
Mega Blastoise Mega Kamekkusu (メガカメックス) (0009)	Water	Blastoise (#009)	—N/a	Mega Blastoise is the Mega Evolved form of Blastoise, a Pokémon that first appeared in the 1996 games Pokémon Red and Blue. The water cannons on its back are about as powerful as a tank gun. Its legs were made to withstand the recoil that its cannons make.
Mega Beedrill Mega Supiā (メガスピアー) (0015)	Bug / Poison	Beedrill (#015)	—N/a	Mega Beedrill is the Mega Evolved form of Beedrill, a Pokémon that first appeared in the 1996 games Pokémon Red and Blue. Its legs now have poisonous stingers on them. It will repeatedly stab its foe with them and deal the final blow with its rear stinger.
Mega Pidgeot Mega Pijotto (メガピジョット) (0018)	Normal / Flying	Pidgeot (#018)	—N/a	Mega Pidgeot is the Mega Evolved form of Pidgeot, a Pokémon that first appeared in the 1996 games Pokémon Red and Blue. Mega Pidgeot's wing strength is now significantly enhanced, enabling it to be able to fly for about two weeks straight.
Mega Alakazam Mega Fūdin (メガフーディン) (0065)	Psychic	Alakazam (#065)	—N/a	Mega Alakazam is the Mega Evolved form of Alakazam, a Pokémon that first appeared in the 1996 games Pokémon Red and Blue. Its muscles and strength have been traded in for more psychic power. Not only can it see a person's entire life in a glance, but when its attacks miss, it is because it is seeing the future with the red organ on its head.
Mega Slowbro Mega Yadoran (メガヤドラン) (0080)	Water / Psychic	Slowbro (#080)	—N/a	Mega Slowbro is the Mega Evolved form of Slowbro, a Pokémon that first appeared in the 1996 games Pokémon Red and Blue. The original form of Slowbro consisted of a Shellder latched onto a Slowpoke's tail. With Shellder now taking up the majority of Slowpoke's body, it is apparently under Shellder's digestive fluid and it acts like a comfortable iron defense for it.
Mega Gengar Mega Gengā (メガゲンガー) (0094)	Ghost / Poison	Gengar (#094)	—N/a	Mega Gengar is the Mega Evolved form of Gengar, a Pokémon that first appeared in the 1996 games Pokémon Red and Blue. Part of its body is in another dimension. Waiting for an opportunity to strike, it will try to kill anyone and everyone, even those it loves and trusts. Its body is full of strange powers.
Mega Kangaskhan Mega Garūra (メガガルーラ) (0115)	Normal	Kangaskhan (#115)	—N/a	Mega Kangaskhan is the Mega Evolved form of Kangaskhan, a Pokémon that first appeared in the 1996 games Pokémon Red and Blue. The explosive energy the child is bathed in causes temporary growth. The mother is beside herself with worry about it. The child and mother work harmoniously together.
Mega Pinsir Mega Kairosu (メガカイロス) (0127)	Bug / Flying	Pinsir (#127)	—N/a	Mega Pinsir is the Mega Evolved form of Pinsir, a Pokémon that first appeared in the 1996 games Pokémon Red and Blue. Now in a constant state of extreme happiness, its wings have unusually developed. It rarely touches the ground as it zooms off at 30 mph looking for foes to stab and shred with its two giant horns.
Mega Gyarados Mega Gyaradosu (メガギャラドス) (0130)	Water / Dark	Gyarados (#130)	—N/a	Mega Gyarados is the Mega Evolved form of Gyarados, a Pokémon that first appeared in the 1996 games Pokémon Red and Blue. Its destructive nature has further ascended due to Mega Evolution energy placing a burden on it only adding to its rage. Its native instinct is to destroy everything it sees using power-jets of water coming from the red orifices on its sides. If a ship is caught in the way, it will be cleanly split in half. However it will listen to a trainer who it shares a deep bond with.
Mega Aerodactyl Mega Putera (メガプテラ) (0142)	Rock / Flying	Aerodactyl (#142)	—N/a	Mega Aerodactyl is the Mega Evolved form of Aerodactyl, a Pokémon that first appeared in the 1996 games Pokémon Red and Blue. The power of Mega Evolution has completely restored its dormant genes, bringing back the sharp stones that once covered its entire body. The stones on it are harder than diamonds, and even scholars say that this is its true appearance. However, this has caused it to be not only way more vicious in return, but irritable and painful, causing it to bite and lash out and anything that moves.
Mega Mewtwo Mega Myūtsū (メガミュウツー) (0150)	Psychic	Mewtwo (#150)	—N/a	Mega Mewtwo X and Y are the Mega Evolved forms of Mewtwo, a Pokémon that first appeared in the 1996 games Pokémon Red and Blue. Like Charizard, Mewtwo was given two Mega Evolutions for X and Y which were made version-exclusive to promote interaction and trading between players.
Mega Mewtwo Mega Myūtsū (メガミュウツー) (0150)	Psychic / Fighting	Mewtwo (#150)	—N/a	Psychic power has augmented this Legendary Pokémon's muscles. It now has a grip strength of one ton and can sprint 100 meters in 2 seconds flat.
Mega Mewtwo Mega Myūtsū (メガミュウツー) (0150)	Psychic	Mewtwo (#150)	—N/a	Despite its small size, its mental power has grown exponentially. With a mere thought, it can smash a skyscraper to smithereens.
Mega Ampharos Mega Denryū (メガデンリュウ) (0181)	Electric / Dragon	Ampharos (#181)	—N/a	Mega Ampharos is the Mega Evolved form of Ampharos, a Pokémon that first appeared in the 1999 games Pokémon Gold and Silver. Mega Evolution energy has stimulated Ampharos' genes so much that it has apparently awoken its "dragon's blood". The wool that it once lost has now regrown. All the red orbs on its head and tail can glow. Its new Dragon typing is based on a pun — in Japanese, its name can be read as "electric current" or "electric dragon"
Mega Steelix Mega Haganēru (メガハガネール) (0208)	Steel / Ground	Steelix (#208)	—N/a	Mega Steelix is the Mega Evolved form of Steelix, a Pokémon that first appeared in the 1999 games Pokémon Gold and Silver. Mega Steelix appears as a larger Steelix with 7 crystalline spears jutting from its body, as well as a circle of iron around its neck. It was first made obtainable in the demo for Pokémon Omega Ruby and Alpha Sapphire.
Mega Scizor Mega Hassamu (メガハッサム) (0212)	Bug / Steel	Scizor (#212)	—N/a	Mega Scizor is the Mega Evolved form of Scizor, a Pokémon that first appeared in the 1999 games Pokémon Gold and Silver. Its pincers have now taken on a diabolical form, now able to rip anything to shreds. However, it cannot sustain this form and battle for a while, or else the weight of its pincers will be to much to bear and the heat from Mega Evolution will cause its body will start to melt.
Mega Heracross Mega Herakurosu (メガヘラクロス) (0214)	Bug / Fighting	Heracross (#214)	—N/a	Mega Heracross is the Mega Evolved form of Heracross, a Pokémon that first appeared in the 1999 games Pokémon Gold and Silver. Heracross gained claw-like hands, a longer horn and red accents on its body when mega evolving. In this state, it has enough power to lift a fighter jet, although when it exerts enough power, it opens the shell on its abdomen and arms to release heat from its rapidly rising body temperature. Mega Heracross may be based on the Hercules beetle.
Mega Houndoom Mega Herugā (メガヘルガー) (0229)	Dark / Fire	Houndoom (#229)	—N/a	Mega Houndoom is the Mega Evolved form of Houndoom, a Pokémon that first appeared in the 1999 games Pokémon Gold and Silver. It can turn its opponents to ash with its fearsome fiery breath, but in return, its red tip of its tail and claws can melt due to it radiating such immense heat.
Mega Tyranitar Mega Bangirasu (メガバンギラス) (0248)	Rock / Dark	Tyranitar (#248)	—N/a	Mega Tyranitar is the Mega Evolved form of Tyranitar, a Pokémon that first appeared in the 1999 games Pokémon Gold and Silver. When it Mega Evolves, its back splits open and with its vicious attitude fueling it, it might not be able to hear and execute its trainer's commands.
Mega Sceptile Mega Jukain (メガジュカイン) (0254)	Grass / Dragon	Sceptile (#254)	—N/a	Mega Sceptile is the Mega Evolved form of Sceptile, a Pokémon that first appeared in the 2002 games Pokémon Ruby and Sapphire. Its tree-esque tail has now grown even further. The circles on its back and tail can explode on contact and it can even launch its own tail.
Mega Blaziken Mega Bashāmo (メガバシャーモ) (0257)	Fire / Fighting	Blaziken (#257)	—N/a	Mega Blaziken is the Mega Evolved form of Blaziken, a Pokémon that first appeared in the 2002 games Pokémon Ruby and Sapphire. Parts of its fiery, hot legs have blackened due to Mega Evolving. It was one of the first Mega Evolutions revealed for X and Y.
Mega Swampert Mega Ragurāji (メガラグラージ) (0260)	Water / Ground	Swampert (#260)	—N/a	Mega Swampert is the Mega Evolved form of Swampert, a Pokémon that first appeared in the 2002 games Pokémon Ruby and Sapphire. Its upper body has grown larger and it has developed large arm muscles. The orange gills and pockets coating its body are now a deep reddish orange.
Mega Gardevoir Mega Sānaito (メガサーナイト) (0282)	Psychic / Fairy	Gardevoir (#282)	—N/a	Mega Gardevoir is the Mega Evolved form of Gardevoir, a Pokémon that first appeared in the 2002 games Pokémon Ruby and Sapphire. Gardevoir's entire body becomes white, and its dress grows much larger, resembling a large ballgown. It is the signature Pokémon of champion Diantha in Pokémon X and Y.
Mega Sableye Mega Yamirami (メガヤミラミ) (0302)	Dark / Ghost	Sableye (#302)	—N/a	Mega Sableye is the Mega Evolved form of Sableye, a Pokémon that first appeared in the 2002 games Pokémon Ruby and Sapphire. The huge jewel that was ripped out of its chest due to Mega Evolution can block any attack. However, it limits Mega Sableye's movement due to it being so big.
Mega Mawile Mega Kuchīto (メガクチート) (0303)	Steel / Fairy	Mawile (#303)	—N/a	Mega Mawile is the Mega Evolved form of Mawile, a Pokémon that first appeared in the 2002 games Pokémon Ruby and Sapphire. It has an extremely vicious disposition. It grips prey in its two sets of jaws and tears them apart with raw power. Its two sets of jaws thrash about violently as if they each had a will of their own. One gnash from them can turn a boulder to dust.
Mega Aggron Mega Bosugodora (メガボスゴドラ) (0306)	Steel	Aggron (#306)	—N/a	Mega Aggron is the Mega Evolved form of Aggron, a Pokémon that first appeared in the 2002 games Pokémon Ruby and Sapphire. Its body becomes coated in a pale white steel armor, granting it a menacing appearance. It is one of two Mega forms (along with Mega Garchomp Z) to lose a type without changing it for another, going from Steel/Rock to pure Steel.
Mega Medicham Mega Chāremu (メガチャーレム) (0308)	Fighting / Psychic	Medicham (#308)	—N/a	Mega Medicham is the Mega Evolved form of Medicham, a Pokémon that first appeared in the 2002 games Pokémon Ruby and Sapphire. It is said that through meditation, Medicham heightens energy inside its body and sharpens its sixth sense. This Pokémon hides its presence by merging itself with fields and mountains.
Mega Manectric Mega Raiboruto (メガライボルト) (0310)	Electric	Manectric (#310)	—N/a	Mega Manectric is the Mega Evolved form of Manetric, a Pokémon that first appeared in the 2002 games Pokémon Ruby and Sapphire. Too much electricity has built up in Mega Manectric, causing irritation. Its yellow mane has grown dramatically and resembles a lightning bolt. Its speed is on par with a lightning bolt.
Mega Sharpedo Mega Samehadā (メガサメハダー) (0319)	Water / Dark	Sharpedo (#319)	—N/a	Mega Sharpedo is the Mega Evolved form of Sharpedo, a Pokémon that first appeared in the 2002 games Pokémon Ruby and Sapphire. Its body is much larger and is coated in scars. It has rows of teeth jutting out of its snout, resembling a saw shark. In Pokémon Omega Ruby and Alpha Sapphire, it is the signature Pokémon of Archie.
Mega Camerupt Mega Bakūda (メガバクーダ) (0323)	Fire / Ground	Camerupt (#323)	—N/a	Mega Camerupt is the Mega Evolved form of Camerupt, a Pokémon that first appeared in the 2002 games Pokémon Ruby and Sapphire. Its two volcanic humps have merged into one large volcano. Camerupt's back is coated in lava and volcanic rock. In Pokémon Omega Ruby and Alpha Sapphire, it is the signature Pokémon of Maxie.
Mega Altaria Mega Chirutarisu (メガチルタリス) (0334)	Dragon / Fairy	Altaria (#334)	—N/a	Mega Altaria is the Mega Evolved form of Altaria, a Pokémon that first appeared in the 2002 games Pokémon Ruby and Sapphire. It is the only Dragon/Fairy type Pokémon in existence. Its cloud like feathers grow making it much larger than normal. It is the signature Pokémon of Lisia.
Mega Banette Mega Jupetta (メガジュペッタ) (0354)	Ghost	Banette (#354)	—N/a	Mega Banette is the Mega Evolved form of Banette, a Pokémon that first appeared in the 2002 games Pokémon Ruby and Sapphire. Its vindictiveness has grown tremendously. Mega Evolution energy has caused the cursing power that was previously held within by its zippers to spill out. It cannot help but to curse its own trainer.
Mega Absol Mega Abusoru (メガアブソル) (0359)	Dark	Absol (#359)	—N/a	Mega Absol is the Mega Evolved form of Absol, a Pokémon that first appeared in the 2002 games Pokémon Ruby and Sapphire. After Mega Evolving, Absol gains a set of small wings. Its hair also grows out to counter its black scythe-like ear, giving the appearing of Yin and Yang.
Mega Glalie Mega Onigōri (メガオニゴーリ) (0362)	Ice	Glalie (#362)	—N/a	Mega Glalie is the Mega Evolved form of Glalie, a Pokémon that first appeared in the 2002 games Pokémon Ruby and Sapphire. Mega Evolution energy has smashed its jaw open, leaving its jaw broken. The fact that it cannot eat properly irritates it immensely, though it can chew and freeze its prey. When it opens its mouth, everything becomes white by the snow it creates.
Mega Salamence Mega Bōmanda (メガボーマンダ) (0373)	Dragon / Flying	Salamence (#373)	—N/a	Mega Salamence is the Mega Evolved form of Salamence, a Pokémon that first appeared in the 2002 games Pokémon Ruby and Sapphire. Mega Salamence can cut straight through most things with just its wings. It may even cut its own trainer in half and will not even notice or care. The Paradox Pokémon Roaring Moon heavily resembles Mega Salamence.
Mega Metagross Mega Metagurosu (メガメタグロス) (0376)	Steel / Psychic	Metagross (#376)	—N/a	Mega Metagross is the Mega Evolved form of Metagross, a Pokémon that first appeared in the 2002 games Pokémon Ruby and Sapphire. Mega Metagross is a combination of one Metagross, two Metang, and four Beldum. It will do anything to win. If it is at a loss, it will dig its claws in its opponent and start the countdown to a massive explosion. It is the signature Pokémon of champion Steven Stone in Pokémon Omega Ruby and Alpha Sapphire.
Mega Latias Mega Ratiasu (メガラティアス) (0380)	Dragon / Psychic	Latias (#380)	—N/a	Mega Latias is the Mega Evolved form of Latias, a Pokémon that first appeared in the 2002 games Pokémon Ruby and Sapphire. Latias gains a purple color scheme and becomes nearly indistinguishable from Latios. It is given to the player in Pokémon Alpha Sapphire and can summoned on command with the Eon Flute, giving access to the soaring mechanic.
Mega Latios Mega Ratiosu (メガラティオス) (0381)	Dragon / Psychic	Latios (#381)	—N/a	Mega Latios is the Mega Evolved form of Latios, a Pokémon that first appeared in the 2002 games Pokémon Ruby and Sapphire. Latios gains a purple color scheme and becomes nearly indistinguishable from Latias. It is given to the player in Pokémon Omega Ruby and can be summoned on command with the Eon Flute, giving access to the soaring mechanic.
Mega Rayquaza Mega Rekkūza (メガレックウザ) (0384)	Dragon / Flying	Rayquaza (#384)	—N/a	Mega Rayquaza is the Mega Evolved form of Rayquaza, a Pokémon that first appeared in the 2002 games Pokémon Ruby and Sapphire. After eating meteorites to fuel its Mega Evolution, Mega Rayquaza is merciless. It will do whatever it takes to win. It is the only Mega Evolved Pokémon that does not require an appropriate Mega Stone to transform, only requiring the move Dragon Ascent to do so.
Mega Lopunny Mega Mimiroppu (メガミミロップ) (0428)	Normal / Fighting	Lopunny (#428)	—N/a	Mega Lopunny is the Mega Evolved form of Lopunny, a Pokémon that first appeared in the 2006 games Pokémon Diamond and Pearl. Its instinctive spirit has awakened as it whips its ears around at the enemy. In this form, all of its fur has been shed to prevent it from getting in the way of attacks.
Mega Garchomp Mega Gaburiasu (メガガブリアス) (0445)	Dragon / Ground	Garchomp (#445)	—N/a	Mega Garchomp is the Mega Evolved form of Garchomp, a Pokémon that first appeared in the 2006 games Pokémon Diamond and Pearl. Mega energy has melted its arms into scythes. It swings these scythes wildly and without the grace of its former form. It slashes away at foes due to its vicious temper.
Mega Lucario Mega Lukario (メガルカリオ) (0448)	Fighting / Steel	Lucario (#448)	—N/a	Mega Lucario is the Mega Evolved form of Lucario, a Pokémon that first appeared in the 2006 games Pokémon Diamond and Pearl. Mega Lucario is gifted to the player in Pokémon X and Y to introduce the player to the concept of Mega Evolution. Black aura energy seeps from its body. Its hands, feet and the tips of two appendages on the back of its head have turned red and the tail has become an extension of its buff-colored body fur. It is the signature Pokémon of Gym Leader Korrina.
Mega Abomasnow Mega Yukinoō (メガユキノオー) (0460)	Grass / Ice	Abomasnow (#460)	—N/a	Mega Abomasnow is the Mega Evolved form of Abomasnow, a Pokémon that first appeared in the 2006 games Pokémon Diamond and Pearl. The shrubs on its back have grown dramatically. These, as well as large ice spikes which have sprouted along its body have forced it to take a quadrupedal stance.
Mega Gallade Mega Erureido (メガエルレイド) (0475)	Psychic / Fighting	Gallade (#475)	—N/a	Mega Gallade is the Mega Evolved form of Gallade, a Pokémon that first appeared in the 2006 games Pokémon Diamond and Pearl. It was added in Pokémon Omega Ruby and Alpha Sapphire as a counterpart to Mega Gardevoir from X and Y. It became the signature Pokémon of Wally in all games after its debut. It gains a whiter color palette and a cape, in similar fashion to Gardevoir's dress.
Mega Audino Mega Tabunne (メガタブンネ) (0531)	Normal / Fairy	Audino (#531)	—N/a	Mega Audino is the Mega Evolved form of Audino, a Pokémon that was introduced in the 2010 games Pokémon Black and White. It gains a more fairy like appearance with this change as well as the Healer ability.
Mega Diancie Mega Dianshī (メガディアンシー) (0719)	Rock / Fairy	Diancie (#719)	—N/a	Mega Diancie is the Mega Evolved form of Diancie, a Pokémon that was introduced in the 2013 games Pokémon X and Y, but the Mega Evolution itself was introduced in the 2014 games Pokémon Omega Ruby and Alpha Sapphire. Referred to as the "Royal Princess", the diamond atop of Mega Diancie's head is said to be 2,000 carats.

=== Primal Forms ===
List of Primal Forms introduced in Generation VI (2013)
Name	Type(s)	Evolves from	Evolves into	Notes
Primal Kyogre Genshi Kaiōga (ゲンシカイオーガ) (0382)	Water	Kyogre (#382)	—N/a	Primal Kyogre is the Primal form of Kyogre, a Pokémon introduced in the 2002 games Pokémon Ruby and Sapphire. It can make the seas and oceans rise tremendously. It can bring horrible rainstorms that instantly put out fires and eventually drown the world.
Primal Groudon Genshi Gurādon (ゲンシグラードン) (0383)	Ground / Fire	Groudon (#383)	—N/a	Primal Groudon is the Primal form of Groudon, a Pokémon introduced in the 2002 games Pokémon Ruby and Sapphire. It can make the sun so harsh that water immediately vaporizes. Able to expand the land, it could easily burn the world in lava.
