= Allister (disambiguation) =

Allister is an American pop punk band from Chicago, Illinois.

Allister may refer to:

- Allister (surname)
- Allister, West Virginia, US, an unincorporated community
- Allister, one of the Gym Leaders in Pokémon Sword and Shield

== See also ==
- Alistair, which includes a list of people with the given name Allister
