= Hop (Pokémon) =

Pokémon rival

- Pokémon character
- Hop in Pokémon Sword and Shield
- First appearance: Pokémon Sword and Shield (2019)
- Voiced by: English: AJ Beckles; Griffin Puatu (Twilight Wings); Adriel Varlack (Evolutions); Japanese: Takuto Yoshinaga; Yuko Sanpei (Twilight Wings, Masters EX); Miyu Irino (Evolutions)

Hop (Japanese: ホップ, Hepburn: Hoppu) is a fictional character in Nintendo and Game Freak's Pokémon franchise. Introduced in the 2019 video games Pokémon Sword and Shield, he is the one of multiple rivals to the protagonist and the younger brother of the Pokémon League Champion, Leon. Hop aspires to become the Champion himself and surpass both the protagonist and his brother. He has a Wooloo and later receives either Grookey, Scorbunny, or Sobble as a starter, depending on which of the three the protagonist chose. Hop also appears in multiple anime series, as well as the Pokémon Trading Card Game.

Hop has received mixed opinions, with criticism directed at his enthusiastic nature and frequent appearances, with critics believing that the flaws of Sword and Shield contributed to the criticism towards Hop. Despite this, some critics were more positive, arguing that his arc was interesting.

== Concept and creation ==
Developed by Game Freak and published by Nintendo, the Pokémon franchise began in Japan in 1996 with the release of the video games Pokémon Red and Blue for the Game Boy. In these games, the player assumes the role of a Pokémon Trainer whose goal is to capture and train creatures called Pokémon. Players use the creatures' special abilities to combat other Pokémon, both in the wild as well as those used by other Trainers. Created for the 2019 sequels Pokémon Sword and Shield, Hop acts as the player's "rival", a type of trainer that acts as a boss the player must defeat during the course of the game multiple times, growing more difficult with each encounter. As a rival, Hop is the first in the series to have two Pokémon to start. This was done to convey that he is more experienced and can serve as a guide to the player..

Hop has had multiple voice actors across different works. In Japanese, he has been voiced by Takuto Yoshinaga, Yūko Sanpei, and Miyu Irino. In English, he has been voiced by AJ Beckles, Griffin Puatu, and Adriel Vardack

== Appearances ==
Hop first appears in Pokémon Sword and Shield, being the friend of the protagonist. He originally only has a Wooloo, but after his brother, Leon, visits, he also gets either the Grass-type Grookey, Fire-type Scorbunny, or Water-type Sobble. The Pokémon he receives is determined by the Pokémon the player picked of these three, choosing the Pokémon that is weak to it (with Grass beating Water, Water beating Fire, and Fire beating Grass). He aspires to become the new Champion in place of Leon by winning in the Galar League. He often appears during the protagonist's quest, offering tips and guidance, and sometimes teaming up with the protagonist. Throughout the gym challenge, Hop suffers setbacks and low self-esteem due to losing battles against the protagonist and fellow rival Bede. Hop eventually competes in the Champion Tournament, where he battles the protagonist and loses. The challenge is then interrupted by Chairman Rose, who intends to summon the Pokémon Eternatus, but is ultimately stopped by Hop and the protagonist, each using the legendary Pokémon Zacian or Zamazenta. After the story is completed, Hop battles the protagonist, and upon losing, decides to pursue becoming a Pokémon Professor. Hop also appears in the Pokémon Trading Card Game, receiving a set of Pokémon species cards themed after him.

In anime appearances, Hop is featured in the series Pokémon: Twilight Wings alongside his Wooloo. Appearing in the episode "Buddy" (2020), he is watching his brother, Leon, battling using his Charizard on television. Seeing Hop gush over the Charizard, Wooloo grows insecure, failing to imitate Charizard's fire breath and flying ability. Afterward, the Wooloo leaves on a quest to prove itself. Hop also appears in the Pokémon anime series, where he briefly battles anime series' main protagonist Ash Ketchum and later cheers Ash on in another battle. He appears in Pokémon Evolutions in the first episode "The Champion" (2021), which focuses on Hop and Leon.

== Critical reception ==
Hop has received mixed reception. Automaton Media writer Minoru Umise identified that Hop was an unpopular character outside of Japan and on social media, noting people who complained about how often he appeared and was a less "refreshing" character than Hau from Pokémon Sun and Moon. Umise disagreed with these complaints, believing that Hop was inoffensive and helps the introduction of the game go smoothly. TheGamer writer Scott Baird expressed frustration with Hop's personality in the game, describing him as an unbearable person who somehow always shows up when unwanted. Baird particularly disliked Hop due to how much he attempts to guide the player, feeling that this disrupted gameplay too much, especially with how simple he found the game to be. Baird felt like Hop represented the problem with rivals in modern Pokémon video games, comparing him unfavorably to Blue from Pokémon Red and Blue and Silver from Pokémon Gold and Silver, who did not talk much and were not friendly to the player.

Game Rant writer Liam Ferguson felt that Hop had the potential to be a good character, finding his motivation—to live up his brother's title—to be a more interesting motivation than most friendly rivals in the series. Ferguson noted that Hop was the only main character of Sword and Shield that never accomplished his goals, considering it interesting to watch him go from arrogant to giving up his quest. He felt that the nature of Sword and Shield held him back, believing that Hop being so present in the game's cutscenes, tutorials, and so many battles made him more annoying. Ferguson argued that, were Hop in Pokémon Scarlet and Violet, he could have been more warmly received. Polygon writer Cass Marshall also noted Hop's poor performance in battle, stating that fighting him always made him feel guilty. Marshall explained that multiple factors influenced this, including Marshall being an adult, the battles being too easy, and Hop being "earnest and relatable." He commented that he saw his young self in Hop's insecurities, comparing beating Hop to being brutally honest about someone's art.

Despite criticism, Hop has also been the subject of praise. Writing for Crunchyroll, Jared Clemon cited Hop's character arc as one of the game's best aspects due to its humanization of Hop's insecurities and the manner in which he overcomes them. Fanbyte writer Kenneth Shepard felt that Hop was a bad trainer, stating that Hop picking a Pokémon that was weak to the player's choice was immediate proof of this. He stated that, despite Hop's shortcomings as a trainer, he was both a well-realized character and one of the most consistent characters in the story. Shepard was not sure whether his poor performance in battle was an intentional choice or a consequence of the game's AI design, citing that Hop would order his Pokémon to use ineffective attacks in battle. Despite initially finding Hop "irritating and boring", TheGamer writer Cian Maher now found Hop to be a great character and one of his favorite Pokémon rivals. He believed that the hate towards him was a byproduct of people disliking Sword and Shield at launch, stating that while he may be too loud and show up too often, he adds more to Sword and Shield than he takes away. Kotaku writer Gita Jackson also defended Hop, arguing that his mannerisms such as praising the player when they land a critical hit reflected a sweet side of him and that he would praise you even when he's losing. They felt that criticism came from the fact that he is not an antagonistic rival like Blue in Pokémon Red and Blue, arguing that players did not like the feeling of having a rival who is saddened when they lose and that their win should be a celebration of their skills.

GamesRadar+ writer Mahin Kesore felt that the trio of rivals in Sword and Shield was done well, appreciating Hop as a friendly rival who is complemented by more competitive rivals in Marnie and Bede. The appreciation of the rival trio was echoed by Siliconera writer Jenni Lada, who noted that each one was memorable and distinct from one another. She felt that Hop in particular was memorable due to his character growth and optimism while struggling with self-esteem.
