= Jack Allister =

Jack Allister may refer to:

- Jack Allister (Australian footballer) (1919–1946), Australian rules footballer
- Jack Allister (Scottish footballer) (1927–1999), Scottish professional soccer player
