= Scorbunny =

Pokémon species

- Pokémon character
- Scorbunny artwork by Ken Sugimori
- First game: Pokémon Sword and Shield
- Voiced by: English: Casey Mongillo; Japanese: Megumi Hayashibara

In-universe information
- Species: Pokémon
- Type: Fire

Scorbunny (/ˈskɔːrbʌniː/), known as Hibanny (Japanese: ヒバニー, Hepburn: Hibanī) in Japan, is a Pokémon species in Nintendo and Game Freak's Pokémon media franchise, and one of the three Starter Pokémon in the games Pokémon Sword and Shield, alongside Grookey and Sobble. Since Scorbunny's debut, it has appeared in multiple games including Pokémon Go and the Pokémon Trading Card Game, as well as various merchandise.

Classified as Fire-type Pokémon, Scorbunny is a red-and-white bipedal rabbit with a bandage-like pattern across its nose. As a Fire type Pokémon, it counters Grookey, a Grass-type Pokémon, and is countered by Sobble, a Water-type Pokémon. It evolves into Raboot before eventually evolving into its final form, Cinderace. It was designed to be an energetic Pokémon that likes to run around. It also appears in the anime Pokémon Journeys: The Series as a Pokémon who belongs to the character Goh.

Scorbunny has received generally positive reception, being a particularly popular Pokémon compared to Grookey and Sobble on debut. It also had some critics and fans worried about whether it would evolve to gain Fighting type as a secondary typing, a worry caused by a high number of Fire/Fighting-type Starters in past games and its design. It received additional attention thanks to appearances in the Pokémon anime and manga, particularly its relationship with the Trainer Goh and its personality.

== Conception and development ==
Scorbunny is a species of fictional creatures called Pokémon created for the Pokémon media franchise. Developed by Game Freak and published by Nintendo, the Japanese franchise began in 1996 with the video games Pokémon Red and Green for the Game Boy, which were later released in North America as Pokémon Red and Blue in 1998. In these games and their sequels, the player assumes the role of a Trainer whose goal is to capture and use the creatures' special abilities to combat other Pokémon. Some Pokémon can transform into stronger species through a process called evolution via various means, such as exposure to specific items. Each Pokémon has one or two elemental types, which define its advantages and disadvantages when battling other Pokémon. A major goal in each game is to complete the Pokédex, a comprehensive Pokémon encyclopedia, by capturing, evolving, and trading with other Trainers to obtain individuals from all Pokémon species.

Scorbunny was designed to complement the other two starter Pokémon in Sword and Shield, Grookey and Sobble. Where Sobble is shy and Grookey is the "mood maker," Scorbunny was designed to be energetic and mischievous. The opening scene with the three Pokémon being introduced was directed by art director James Turner, who wanted to use the scene to depict the Pokémon's personalities and how they look out for each other. They believed that the trainer who prefers Scorbunny would be someone who can keep up with it and likes to run around a lot.

=== Design ===
Scorbunny is a rabbit Pokémon with primarily white fur, featuring red-and-orange accents. It has traits similar to rabbits, including floppy ears, a puffy tail, buck teeth, and big feet. It has flammable patches on the bottom of its feet that work like flint, which causes it to leave burning footprints. Scorbunny has a patch on its nose, meant to resemble a bandage, which also generates heat. Sword and Shield's director, Shigeru Ohmori, stated that this was meant to give a sense that it could run off or cause trouble. Its bandage motif is a common one in Japan.

== Appearances ==
Scorbunny was originally featured as one of the three Starter Pokémon in Pokémon Sword and Shield. It is the Fire-type Pokémon in the trio, accompanied by the Grass-type Grookey and Water-type Sobble. If Scorbunny is chosen, the player's rival, Hop, will choose Grookey, while the Champion of the region, Leon, chooses Sobble. This is atypical of earlier Pokémon games; where Hop picks the Grass-type, which is weak to Scorbunny, the rival typically would pick Sobble, which beats Scorbunny. It can eventually evolve into its second form, Raboot, and finally Cinderace. Like the other Starters' final forms, its evolution, Cinderace, gets a special form called a Gigantamax form that has increased stats and different battle mechanics. Scorbunny and its evolutions were not featured in Pokémon Scarlet and Violet at launch, only made available as part of the Indigo Disk portion of The Hidden Treasure of Area Zero expansion pass. It will only appear after the player expands various biomes enough. It also appears in the mobile game, Pokémon Go. Scorbunny appears in side games such as New Pokémon Snap.

Scorbunny has been featured as a card in the Pokémon Trading Card Game multiple times, including as a card called "Scorbunny on the Ball" as part of a collaboration with the Football Association in the United Kingdom.

In the anime Pokémon Journeys: The Series, it appears as the focus of the episode "Settling the Scorbunny," where it joined with a group of Nickits to steal scones, being brown due to staying covered in mud to better resemble the Nickits. The character Goh helps Scorbunny and the Nickits when they experience consequences for their thefts, causing the Scorbunny to wash the mud off and follow Goh and protagonist Ash Ketchum further into the Galar region. This Scorbunny attempted to join Goh on his journey, but Goh declined him, saying that he wanted the first Pokémon he catches to be the Mythical Pokémon Mew. Later, a Snorlax Gigantamaxes and attacks them, causing Scorbunny to protect Goh. This, in turn, causes Goh to accept Scorbunny as his first Pokémon. The duo also appear in the manga Pokémon Journeys, which features a similar origin to their relationship, with the first volume showing how they came to be allied.

== Critical reception ==
Scorbunny has received generally positive reception. USA Today writers Cian Maher and Ryan Woodrow discussed how popular Scorbunny was with both fans and staff involved in the Pokémon brand, citing its appearance in New Pokémon Snap and Pokémon Unite, as well as the quality of its Gigantamax form. They also remarked that the Grass starter Grookey looks worse by virtue of how good Scorbunny is. GameBonfire writer Aurora discussed the negative reception to the starters' final forms, expressing that they were not surprised by the negative reaction, believing that the change in design to a "rabbit in red shorts" was difficult for them to digest in a short period of time. They added that, despite the negative reception, Cinderace had the most positive reception of the three. IGN writer Janet Garcia was fond of Scorbunny despite otherwise not being interested in Fire-type Pokémon, considering it one of the cutest Pokémon introduced in Sword and Shield, commenting on how the "Nelly bandage" across its face eventually grew on her. TheGamer writer Stacey Henley expressed that Cinderace in Pokémon Unite helped make her come to regard Scorbunny as her favorite starter, despite lining up with design concepts she was not a fan of. She specifically expressed that she did not like single-type starter Pokémon, finding them boring, adding that she found humanoid Pokémon "creepy" in general. She enjoyed the motif of a soccer-playing Pokémon, and found it enjoyable to use in Unite.

Despite this positive reception, at the time of the three starter Pokémon's reveal in Sword and Shield, Game Revolution writer Toby Saunders felt it was the weakest design, as well as being a weaker design than other rabbit-based Pokémon like Lopunny, Diggersby, and Azumarill. He also felt the design evoked a "1980s/90s live-action/cartoon crossover," hoping that its evolution would be an improvement both in terms of design and typing. GamesBeat writer Mike Minotti felt that, while cute, Scorbunny was too similar to a "Saturday morning cartoon character," further criticizing its final evolution for being too much like a human. Despite these criticisms, Minotti and fellow GamesBeat writer agreed that its second form, Raboot, was excellent, with Minotti feeling like it showed a lot of potential for what its final design could have been and Grubbs arguing that it succeeds at executing the soccer concept better than Cinderace. Los Angeles Times writers Todd Martens and Tracy Brown were split; Martens viewed Scorbunny as overconfident personality, a turn-off for him. Brown, meanwhile saw it as being more of an "excitable athlete" than overconfident, the latter picking Scorbunny due to it being cute and Fire types being comparatively rare compared to Water types.

Whether Scorbunny would evolve to gain a Fighting type was the subject of speculation due to the high number of Fire and Fighting-type starter Pokémon in past games, with Nintendo Force Magazine writer Brett Martin hoping that Scorbunny would not be Fighting type upon evolving. Kotaku writer Gita Jackson expressed how much they love Scorbunny, noting that the worry about it evolving into a Fighting type comes from the bandage on its nose. They believed that Pokémon used design motifs to signal their types, claiming that Fighting-type Pokémon had a "sporty" look to them. They also cited its "sporty vibe," such as it being long, lean, and fast. Jackson personally expressed hope that it would not have a Fighting type.

Scorbunny has received commentary for its appearance in the Pokémon anime. Hobby Consolas writer José Carlos Pozo discussed how Goh received strong fan backlash for rejecting Scorbunny at first, adding that despite Goh eventually accepting it, fans seemed to not be ready to forgive him. Anime News Network writer James Beckett considered it one of the best starter Pokémon, commenting that Scorbunny is the "star of the show" in the anime. He argued that it had strong "personality and verve," and that it should become the series' next mascot next to Pikachu. Siliconera writer Jenni Lada, while covering the Pokémon Journeys manga, also felt that Goh's Scorbunny had a similar personality and backstory to Pikachu, discussing how it initially started off standoffish to people and ultimately grows to be better, similarly to Goh's progression. She also felt that their progress juxtaposed well with Ash and Pikachu.
