= Sobble =

Pokémon species

- Pokémon character
- Sobble artwork by Ken Sugimori
- First game: Pokémon Sword and Shield (2019)

In-universe information
- Species: Pokémon
- Type: Water

Sobble (/ˈsɑːbəl/), known in Japan as Messon (Japanese: メッソン), is a Pokémon species in Nintendo and Game Freak's Pokémon franchise. It was first introduced in Pokémon Sword and Shield and is one of three Pokémon available to the player at the beginning of the game, along with Grookey and Scorbunny. It is a Water-type Pokémon and evolves into Drizzile, then Inteleon, both of which are also Water-type.

Sobble was designed by the development team to be a timid Pokémon in order to provide a contrast with the other starter Pokémon in Sword and Shield, Grookey and Scorbunny. While popular among fans, critical response was mixed, with some reviewers praising Sobble's design and personality, while others were confused as to why Sobble cries, calling it "irritating ".

== Concept and creation ==
Sobble is a species of fictional creatures called Pokémon created for the Pokémon media franchise. Developed by Game Freak and published by Nintendo, the Japanese franchise began in 1996 with the video games Pokémon Red and Green for the Game Boy, which were later released in North America as Pokémon Red and Blue in 1998. In these games and their sequels, the player assumes the role of a Trainer whose goal is to capture and use the creatures' special abilities to combat other Pokémon. Some Pokémon can transform into stronger species through a process called evolution via various means, such as exposure to specific items. Each Pokémon has one or two elemental types, which define its advantages and disadvantages when battling other Pokémon. A major goal in each game is to complete the Pokédex, a comprehensive Pokémon encyclopedia, by capturing, evolving, and trading with other Trainers to obtain individuals from all Pokémon species.

Standing at 12 inches (0.3m) tall and weighing 8.8 pounds (4 kg). Sobble is a small lizard Pokémon able to camouflage itself when touching water. When it is nervous, embarrassed, or upset, it may cry, which can both cause it to become transparent and cause those around it to cry. Sobble has a "type," an elemental attribute that affects its strengths and weaknesses: Water. The design process involved a visual designer and a gameplay/feature planner cooperating to come up with ideas, with Sobble being created by one such team. The designers noted that the trio of starter Pokémon in Sword and Shield are more distinct than previous generations, and they intentionally made it more subdued to complement the "more energetic" Scorbunny and the "mood-maker" Grookey. The designers considered Sobble's meek personality as unusual for a starter Pokémon. They commented that Sobble would be good for players who are "kind and caring." Pokémon species designer James Turner expressed that he liked Sobble because it is "cute" and people "want to take care of [it]". Sword and Shield director Shigeru Ohmori described a culture in Japan where people find something cute because they feel sorry for it, and thus expected Sobble to be popular in Japan, with uncertainty about how it would be received elsewhere.

== Appearances ==
Sobble is a Water-type Pokémon and one of the three starting Pokémon available to the player in the 2019 video games Pokémon Sword and Shield, along with the Grass-type Grookey and Fire-type Scorbunny. Its second evolution stage, Drizzile, is followed by Inteleon. Both species are Water-type and do not gain any new types when evolving. It is not obtainable without trading in Pokémon Scarlet and Violet, but it was made available through The Indigo Disk, the second part of the games' downloadable content, Pokémon Scarlet and Violet: The Hidden Treasure of Area Zero. It also appears in Super Smash Bros. Ultimate as a Spirit, a collectible that can be used to upgrade a character's abilities or stats. In New Pokémon Snap, 6 Sobble appear living in the Founja Jungle and another in the Mightywide River along with Grookey. Sobble has also made their appearance in Pokémon Café ReMix and Pokémon Masters EX. In Pokémon UNITE, Sobble exists as part of the Inteleon license. In September 2024, many of the Galar Pokémon including Sobble have been made available to catch in Pokémon GO.

Sobble appears in Pokémon Journeys: The Series as a Pokémon belonging to the trainer Goh. Goh's Sobble evolves as the series progresses. It has also been the subject of multiple cards in the Pokémon Trading Card Game.

== Promotion and reception ==
Sobble crying in the Pokémon anime. Its tendency to cry and overall baby-like and sensitive nature resulted in significant commentary in regards to both its popularity and reasons for the design's appeal.

Sobble has been used in promotion for the series since its debut, appearing in the form of plushies, figurines, and t-shirts. Despite the development team's concerns about Sobble's international popularity, Sobble has been one of the more popular Pokémon in Sword and Shield worldwide and was voted the most popular of the starter trio in Sword and Shield in an official poll conducted by the Pokémon X account. Sobble also won in a similar poll by Inside Games, while one by IT Media found Sobble to be the seventh most popular of all the new Sword and Shield Pokémon.

The depiction of Sobble as a timid creature has influenced its fanart, where much of it involved the species crying. Polygon writer Patricia Hernandez found it interesting that Sobble was so well-received, drawing comparisons between it and Popplio, who was criticized for having a similar "innocent demeanor." She found that Sobble's more baby-like attitude and more open negative emotions helped influence the more positive response to Sobble in comparison to Popplio. Fanbyte writer Dylan Bishop felt kinship with Sobble's anxiety and sadness, saying that Sobble was a good fit for anxious players. He also commented on how it reflected on Game Freak's intent to emphasize emotions in the games, citing that, in conjunction with other Sword and Shield Pokémon Wooloo, the Pokémon used their anxiety to help make players relate to the species on a more emotional level compared to past Pokémon. Examining the starters, Vice writer Natalie Watson questioned why Sobble had to be crying, citing that she felt Pokémon should be happy. While she found it relatable due to being an "anxious wreck," she hoped it would evolve into a less depressed Pokémon. Polygon writer Nicole Carpenter felt that Sobble was the best starter Pokémon in Sword and Shield, as well as her favorite in the games at the time.

USA Today writers Cian Maher and Ryan Woodrow criticized Sobble as annoying due to its cowardice, further describing its "edgelord" evolutions while expressing their confusion as to why it was popular. An article for The Gamer examining Sword and Shield's starters offered similar thoughts regarding its evolution, questioning what caused Sobble to go from a "crying boi" to a "secret agent" and arguing that it has an unusual lack of a clear path that other starter forms have in regards to their evolutionary growth.

Other writers for The Gamer felt differently. In a discussion with the website's staff examining various Pokémon from throughout the franchise, Rhiannon Bevan defended Sobble, saying that anyone who does has a "heart [...] made of coal." She identified it as her second-favorite Pokémon in the franchise, and felt that controversies with Sword and Shield as a game overshadowed Sobble, stating that in any other series title, it would have been a fan favorite. Fellow writer Ben Sledge identified it as his third-favorite Pokémon, and while he acknowledged his own misgivings with its evolutions, he felt much of the criticisms toward it and its evolutionary line would be dampened by the fervor of fans if they were introduced in Pokémon Red and Blue.

== See also ==
- Charmander
- Treecko
- Snivy
