= Wooloo =

Pokémon species

- Pokémon character
- Wooloo artwork by Ken Sugimori
- First game: Pokémon Sword and Shield (2019)
- Voiced by: EN: Erica Mendez; JA: Rikako Aikawa

In-universe information
- Species: Pokémon
- Type: Normal

Wooloo (/ˈwuːluː/; Japanese: ウールー, Hepburn: Ūrū) is a Pokémon species in Nintendo and Game Freak's Pokémon media franchise. First introduced in the video games Pokémon Sword and Shield, they were inspired by the large amount of sheep native to Britain, the location on which Sword and Shield's Galar region is based. Since their initial appearance they have appeared in both Pokémon GO and the Pokémon Trading Card Game, as well as various merchandise related to the franchise. In addition, they appear in manga and anime adaptations of the Pokémon franchise, with their appearances in the latter being voiced by Rikako Aikawa in Japanese, and Erica Mendez in English.

Classified as a Normal-type Pokémon, Wooloo appears as a short, round sheep with white wool that is used heavily in the Galar region. Their woolly body also protects them from bodily harm, causing them to bounce instead. Naturally anxious, instead of walking or running they tend to roll forwards and backwards. Once they have acquired enough experience, they can evolve into a stronger form, Dubwool.

Upon reveal, Wooloo became extremely popular, with a multitude of Internet memes and fan art following suit, and has been described as the unofficial mascot of Sword and Shield due to their heavy presence in the titles and popularity, furthered by its appearance in the related anime. This reaction not only surprised the games' director, Shigeru Ohmori, but caused Tumblr to change its year end examination of discussed subjects to now account for Pokémon. Further media discussions have examined its design in light of this, and also in regards to the franchise's long development as a whole.

== Conception and design ==
Wooloo is a species of fictional creatures called Pokémon created for the Pokémon media franchise. Developed by Game Freak and published by Nintendo, the Japanese franchise began in 1996 with the video games Pokémon Red and Green for the Game Boy, which were later released in North America as Pokémon Red and Blue in 1998. In these games and their sequels, the player assumes the role of a Trainer whose goal is to capture and use the creatures' special abilities to combat other Pokémon. Some Pokémon can transform into stronger species through a process called evolution via various means, such as exposure to specific items. Each Pokémon has one or two elemental types, which define its advantages and disadvantages when battling other Pokémon. A major goal in each game is to complete the Pokédex, a comprehensive Pokémon encyclopedia, by capturing, evolving, and trading with other Trainers to obtain individuals from all Pokémon species.

When developing Pokémon Sword and Shield, the development team researched what creatures were native to Britain, the real world location upon which Sword and Shield's Galar location is based on. Discovering the large amount of sheep in the country, the team wanted to create a Pokémon based around it, though game director Shigeru Ohmori noted this was complicated by the existence of Mareep, a similar sheep-inspired Pokémon already present in the franchise. Standing 2 feet (60 cm) tall and classified as a "Normal" type species, Wooloo appears as a short, round sheep with white wool, and has a dark brown face with matching hooves. In addition, two dark brown horns poke from the top of their heads through the wool, while a pair of slightly grey braids dangle from the sides of their heads. A rarer, "shiny" variation also exists with the color scheme inverted: white on the body, while the wool is near black.

Wooloo's wool protects it from blunt force trauma, causing it instead to bounce, and is used as a commodity in the Galar region due to its durability. Highly anxious, Wooloo try to avoid conflict, and tend to move by rolling forwards and backwards. Unlike other Pokémon species, their speech patterns are not based on saying variations of their names, but instead communicate similarly to actual sheep. After obtaining enough experience, Wooloo can evolve into a stronger Pokémon species, Dubwool.

== Appearances ==
First introduced in the 2019 video games Pokémon Sword and Shield, Wooloo appear in multiple locations, some as wild Pokémon for the player to capture, but also occasionally acting as a roadblock to temporarily prevent the player from certain paths. In addition, the game's "rival" character, Hop, will challenge the player with his pet Wooloo from time to time, while early game boss Gym Leader Milo will require the player to corral several Wooloo before he can be fought. Outside of Sword and Shield, Wooloo also appears in Pokémon Go, on cards for the Pokémon Trading Card Game, and on a variety of merchandise including plushies, figurines, sweaters, and Funko Pops.

Several Wooloo appear in anime and manga of the Pokémon franchise, most prominently in Pokémon: Twilight Wings alongside Hop. Featured in the episode "Buddy", it appears alongside Hop as the latter is watching his brother's Pokémon battle on television. While Hop gushes over his brother's dragon-like Charizard Pokémon, his Wooloo gets jealous and tries to imitate its fire breath and flight and fails quickly at both. Dejected, Wooloo runs away, and after trying in vain to fly again it crashes into Pokémon trainer Milo's field as he's tending to his own Wooloo. After Milo sends Wooloo back home, it reflects on Hop's affection towards it along the way. Meanwhile Hop has been frantically searching for it. After the two catch sight of each other they are reunited and return home together. In Japanese, all Wooloo are voiced by Rikako Aikawa, while in English they are voiced by Erica Mendez.

== Critical reception ==
Much of Wooloo's reception focused on their round body and method of movement.

Wooloo was positively received since their introduction, with a large amount of fan art and memes following their reveal trailer. The reaction in particular took Ohmori by surprise, who had considered them "just another Pokémon that was there in the mix" when developing the games. In 2019, animal rights group PETA utilized Wooloo's image on social media website Twitter to make a statement against sheep shearing, resulting in a backlash and heavy criticism towards the group. Later that year, social media website Tumblr released its end of year lists examining most discussed subjects on the website, which now included a list of Pokémon in response to the "immediate 'Wooloo is our baby' vibe" amongst its users. Wooloo placed second on it, right behind series mascot Pikachu.

IGN's Janet Garcia called them the cutest Pokémon from Sword and Shield, stating, "I don't know if there's such a thing as a perfect Pokémon but this might be it," adding that while she acknowledged they could easily be disregarded as just sheep, she disregarded the criticism and enjoyed Wooloo's round body and braids. Hirun Cryer of VG247 noted that while it was one of the first Pokémon seen in the games, "it's a testament to Wooloo's loveable design that we're still infatuated with it even after having seen tons of other new creatures", attributing some of the appeal to how it moved by rolling instead of walking. Nadine Manske of Dot eSports stated similar sentiments, further adding that in comparison to previous titles in the franchise, "being met with a herd of fluffy sheep is a memorable way of starting off the generation eight games." Patricia Hernandez in an article for Polygon stated that while she recognized the species' popularity, it wasn't until the Twilight Wings episode that she felt the same appeal, feeling it humanized Wooloo while drawing comparisons to fellow Pokémon Mimikyu's characterization. And while Tim Rogers of Kotaku acknowledged that people criticizing Wooloo as "literally just a sheep" were correct, he argued their recognizability served as an example of the strengths of character design in the Pokémon franchise.

Examining their design and the reasons behind their popularity, Michael McWhertor of Polygon described Wooloo as "perfect in every way", attributing their appeal in part to their round shape but also their innate friendliness, two aspects he noted that people would naturally enjoy. Paste writers Kevin Slackie and Moises Taveras called it the unofficial mascot of Sword and Shield, considering their high presence in the title but also their "cuteness", which they noted was "not necessarily true of all Pokémon, but is integral to some of the very best of them", and helped make them one of the best Pokémon in the franchise in their eyes. In contrast, Hannah Collins of Comic Book Resources argued that Wooloo's depiction, more specifically that in Twilight Wings, helped illustrate the issue with player perception towards Normal-type Pokémon in the context of the games: while some were loved for how they appeared, the typing was often seen as unremarkable and overshadowed by the implications and appeal of the others.

Discussing newer Pokémon in comparison to earlier generations, Fanbyte's Dylan Bishop argued that some like Wooloo were designed with a different goal in mind, intended to connect to players on an emotional level. In particular, he felt Wooloo's anxiety was "relatable" for players with similar personalities, stating that "there's something comforting about a little sheep that wants to run away from its problems just like you do." Bishop further argued that the Pokémon was designed to be "your perfect partner, just as you're its complement", made to draw the player in with an appearance and personality that was instantly memeable and encouraged players to state their affection for it on social media. He concluded by stating that designs like Wooloo's were a sign future games would provide further multilayered partners, "true Pokémon friends, resonant of our actual emotions, that Trainers worldwide will fall in love with".
