= Takuto Yoshinaga =

Japanese voice actor (born 1999)

- 吉永 拓斗
- Born: September 14, 1999 (age 27); Saitama Prefecture, Japan
- Occupations: Actor; voice actor; singer
- Years active: 2002–present
- Agent: Himawari Theatre Group
- Notable work: Beatless as Arato Endo; Days as Tsukushi Tsukamoto

Takuto Yoshinaga (吉永 拓斗, Yoshinaga Takuto; born September 14, 1999) is a Japanese actor and singer who is affiliated with the Himawari Theatre Group. He is known for his roles as Arato Endo in Beatless and Tsukushi Tsukamoto in Days.

== Biography ==
Yoshinaga joined Himawari Theatre Group in 2002.

In 2016, he got his first main character role in Days as Tsukushi Tsukamoto.

On November 19, 2017, Yoshinaga joined the label Kiramune as a member of SparQlew.

== Filmography ==
=== Anime ===
2015

- Tokyo Ghoul √A, Kōtarō Amon (young, episode 4)

2016

- Macross Delta, Goora (episode 6)
- Days, Tsukushi Tsukamoto
- Puzzle & Dragons X, Ace

2018

- Beatless, Arato Endo
- Hinomaru Sumo, Shun Kariya
- Ace Attorney Season 2, Rick Steam (episodes 10–12)
- Double Decker! Doug & Kirill, Gus

2019

- Welcome to Demon School! Iruma-kun, Picero Agares, Robin Bars

2021

- Yu-Gi-Oh! Sevens, Braun Honya
- I'm Standing on a Million Lives, Friend (episodes 6–7)
- Restaurant in Another World season 2, Jack (episode 3)
- Sakugan, Royby (episode 6)

2022

- Pokémon Ultimate Journeys: The Series, Hop
- I'm the Villainess, So I'm Taming the Final Boss, Denis
- Boruto: Naruto Next Generations, Eiki Fūma

2023

- Yu-Gi-Oh! Go Rush!!, Bookstore Henry

2024

- Vampire Dormitory, Candy-senpai

2025

- The Blue Wolves of Mibu, Kagemaru

2026

- Snowball Earth, Tetsuo Yabusame

=== Anime films ===
- The Disappearance of Haruhi Suzumiya (2010), Boy
- Welcome to the Space Show (2010), Kouji Harada
- The Princess and the Pilot (2011), young Charles Karino
- Saint Seiya: Legend of Sanctuary (2012), young Pegasus Seiya

=== Video games ===
- Kingdom Hearts Birth by Sleep (2010), young Sora
- Sonic Generations (2011), Classic Tails

=== Dubbing ===
- Frankenweenie (Victor Frankenstein)
