= Allister (surname) =

Allister or Allster is a surname of Scottish origin. Notable people with the surname include:

== People ==
- Claud Allister (1888–1970), English actor born William Claud Michael Palmer
- Donald Allister (born 1952), Church of England bishop
- Jack Allister (Australian footballer) (1919–1946)
- Jack Allister (Scottish footballer) (1927–1999)
- Jean Allister (1932–2012), opera singer from Northern Ireland
- Jessica Allister (born 1982), American softball coach and former catcher
- Jim Allister (born 1953), Ulster loyalist politician and barrister from Northern Ireland

== Fictional Character ==
- Flay Allster, a fictional character from Mobile Suit Gundam SEED
- George Allster, a fictional character from Mobile Suit Gundam SEED

== See also ==
- McAllister (surname), a Scottish surname
