= Allister, West Virginia =

Unincorporated community in West Virginia, United States

Allister
- Unincorporated community
- Location within the state of West Virginia Allister (the United States)
- Coordinates: 39°36′5″N 80°41′38″W
- Country: United States
- State: West Virginia
- County: Wetzel
- Elevation: 1,335 ft (407 m)
- Time zone: UTC-5 (Eastern (EST))
  - Summer (DST): UTC-4 (EDT)
- GNIS ID: 1549561

Allister is an unincorporated community in Wetzel County, West Virginia, United States.
