= Shigeru Ohmori =

Japanese video game producer

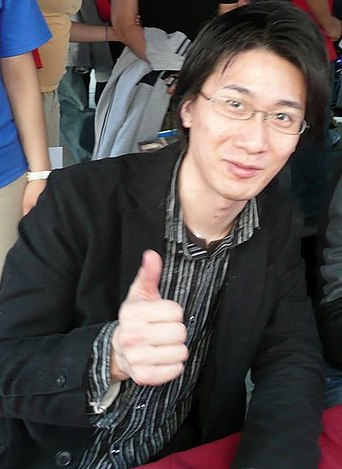
- Ohmori in 2007
- Born: 29 February 1980 (age 46); Matsudo, Chiba, Japan
- Years active: 2001–present
- Employer: Game Freak

Shigeru Ohmori (/ˈʃɪɡɛruː ˈoʊmoʊrɪ/ SHI-ger-roo OH-moh-ri; Japanese: 大森滋, Hepburn: Ōmori Shigeru, IPA: [oːmori ɕigeru]; born 29 February 1980) is a Japanese video game director, designer, and developer best known for his work in the Pokémon franchise. He has worked for Game Freak since 2001, and has been the primary director of Pokémon video game titles since Pokémon Omega Ruby and Alpha Sapphire in 2014.

== Career ==
Ohmori was born on 29 February 1980 in Matsudo city, in Chiba Prefecture. According to Ohmori, his parents died when he was young, which served as inspiration for the character Arven in Pokémon Scarlet and Violet. He went to a vocational school and studied programming, and before he had graduated he had worked on the commercial video game title Yakiniku Bugyou. He applied to Game Freak initially as a programmer, but according to Ohmori he found out he preferred video game design to programming, and instead applied to be a designer. The first title he worked on in Game Freak was Pokémon Ruby and Sapphire, immediately upon joining, and in the succeeding titles Pokémon Diamond and Pearl he was a lead designer.

According to Junichi Masuda, director of Pokémon titles before 2014, he appointed Ohmori to be his successor in directing future Pokémon games during the development for Pokémon X and Y. At that time, Ohmori was the games' design director. With fan requests for a remake of Ruby and Sapphire, Masuda opted for Ohmori due to Ohmori's strong connection with the old games, and Ohmori was informed of Masuda's decision on the games' tenth anniversary. The remake Pokémon Omega Ruby and Alpha Sapphire was released in 2014, and immediately after its development had concluded Ohmori reprised his directorial role for the 2016 titles Pokémon Sun and Moon.

Sun and Moon was Ohmori's first new-generation title as director. The games were themed around nature, and in its design Ohmori increased the emphasis the games gave towards the Pokémon creatures themselves. In an interview with USGamer, Ohmori also remarked that he wanted to design the new games "from scratch", and hence new game mechanics were introduced. In the following generation's titles, Pokémon Sword and Shield, Ohmori continued to be director. According to Ohmori, due to the Nintendo Switch's increased resolution, it became possible to include smaller visual items along with larger ones, enabling the addition of features such as multiplayer cooperative battles. One design item which took up Ohmori's attention was the grass in the games – as players perceived grass patches to be potential location for Pokémon, it was considered a core design element and Ohmori took half a year with his team to finalize it.

Ohmori retained his directorial position in the 2022 titles Pokémon Scarlet and Violet. The game continued to exclude voice acting as with previous titles, with Ohmori noting that without character voices "players can kind of create their own image of who that character is as they’re playing".

== Works ==
Year	Game title	Role
2001	Yakiniku Bugyou	Planner
2002	Pokémon Ruby and Sapphire	Game designer, map designer
2003	Pokémon Box: Ruby and Sapphire	Planner
2004	Pokémon FireRed and LeafGreen	Game designer, map designer
2004	Pokémon Emerald	Game designer, map designer
2005	Drill Dozer	Game designer, additional tuning
2006	Pokémon Ranger	Game design advisor
2006	Pokémon Diamond and Pearl	Lead game designer, plot scenario, map designer
2008	Pokémon Platinum	Game designer, plot scenario, map designer
2009	Pokémon HeartGold and SoulSilver	Game designer
2010	Pokémon Black and White	Lead game designer of special elements, map designer
2012	HarmoKnight	Game designer
2013	Pokémon X and Y	Planning director, pokemon design coordination
2014	Pokémon Omega Ruby and Alpha Sapphire	Director, concept, plot
2016	Pokémon Sun and Moon	Director, planning director
2017	Pokémon Ultra Sun and Ultra Moon	Producer
2018	Pokémon Quest	Supervisor
2018	Pokémon: Let's Go, Pikachu! and Let's Go, Eevee!	Producer
2019	Pokémon Sword and Shield	Director, concept
2022	Pokémon Legends: Arceus	Producer
2022	Pokémon Scarlet and Violet	Director, concept
2025	Pokémon Legends: Z-A	Senior director, general producer
2026	Pokémon Pokopia	Senior director, general producer, concept
2026	Pokémon Champions	General producer
2026	Beast of Reincarnation	General producer
2026	Ame no Chi Hare Onna	Director, producer
