= Jack Allister (Australian footballer) =

Australian rules footballer

Personal information
- Full name: John Collin William Allister
- Born: 15 March 1919; Ascot Vale, Victoria
- Died: 22 March 1946 (aged 27); Parkville, Victoria
- Original team: St Paul's (Ascot Vale)
- Height: 173 cm (5 ft 8 in)
- Weight: 77 kg (170 lb)

Playing career^{1}
Years	Club	Games (Goals)
1938	Essendon	1 (1)
1941–1945	North Melbourne	58 (54)
Total		59 (55)
- ^{1} Playing statistics correct to the end of 1945.

John Collin William Allister (15 March 1919 – 22 March 1946), known as "Jack", and as "Tich", was an Australian rules footballer who played for North Melbourne in the Victorian Football League (VFL).

== Family ==
The son of James Allister, and Henrietta Leonora Allister (1894–1953), née Wills, John Collin William Allister was born on 15 March 1919 in Ascot Vale, Victoria.

== Football ==
=== Esendon (VFL) ===
Allister started his career in 1938 with Essendon but managed just one game.

=== Sandringham (VFA) ===
In 1939 and 1940 he played with Sandringham in the VFA.

=== North Melbourne (VFA) ===
He returned to the VFL in 1941 and joined North Melbourne, playing 58 games for the club over his five seasons. His best year came in 1942 when he kicked 29 goals and was North Melbourne's best and fairest.

== Death ==
He died of pneumonia on 22 March 1946.
