= Pokémon Sword and Shield =

2019 video games

Pokémon Sword; Pokémon Shield
- Left: Box art for Sword, depicting the legendary Pokémon Zacian; Right: Box art for Shield, depicting the legendary Pokémon Zamazenta
- Developer: Game Freak
- Publishers: JP: The Pokémon Company; WW: Nintendo
- Director: Shigeru Ohmori
- Producers: Junichi Masuda; Hitoshi Yamagami; Akira Kinashi; Takanori Sowa; Mikiko Ohashi; Shin Uwai
- Designer: Kazumasa Iwao
- Programmer: Tomoya Takahashi
- Artists: James Turner; Suguru Nakatsui
- Writer: Toshinobu Matsumiya
- Composers: Go Ichinose; Minako Adachi
- Series: Pokémon
- Platform: Nintendo Switch
- Release: 15 November 2019
- Genre: Role-playing
- Modes: Single-player, multiplayer

Pokémon Sword (Note: Japanese: ポケットモンスター ソード, Hepburn: Poketto Monsutā Sōdo) and Pokémon Shield (Note: Japanese: ポケットモンスター シールド, Hepburn: Poketto Monsutā Shīrudo) are 2019 role-playing video games developed by Game Freak and published by The Pokémon Company and Nintendo for the Nintendo Switch console. They are the first instalments in the 8th generation of the Pokémon video game series. First teased at E3 2017 and announced in February 2019, the games were released on 15 November 2019. The games were accompanied by a downloadable content (DLC) expansion pass consisting of Part 1—The Isle of Armor (released in June 2020) and Part 2—The Crown Tundra (October 2020); its launch marked the first ever DLC released as part of the Pokémon video game series instead of an improved version.

In the game story, a young Pokémon Trainer begins their adventure in the Galar Region along with their friend/rival Hop as they join the Gym Challenge that allows them to compete with others for the title of Galar League Champion, due to them both getting a letter from Hop's brother and undefeated Galar League Champion, Leon. The games introduced many new features including the Dynamax and Gigantamax mechanic, which causes a player's Pokémon to grow to a significantly larger size and use more powerful attacks in battle. Conceptualization of the game began immediately following the completion of Pokémon Sun and Moon in 2016, while full development began a year later. The games were designed around the intent of utilizing the improved hardware capabilities of the Nintendo Switch. The Dynamax mechanic was similarly designed around the ability to see larger battles than were previously possible in the series.

Pokémon games feature a system where Pokémon from past games are able to be transferred into newer installments; when it was announced that Sword and Shield would exclude many pre-existing Pokémon from being usable in the games, it triggered a backlash from fans who called it "Dexit" as a nod to Brexit and resulted in an extensive controversy. Sword and Shield received generally positive reviews from critics, who praised the games' gameplay, exploration, and mechanics, although the lack of innovation received some criticism. As of December 2025, the games had sold more than 27 million copies worldwide, making them the third best-selling titles in the Pokémon video game series. The games won awards at the SXSW Gaming Awards and Famitsu Dengeki Game Awards 2019.

== Gameplay ==
The player character travelling through the game's Route 1

Pokémon Sword and Shield are RPGs with adventure elements. They are presented in a fixed camera, third-person perspective, though some areas allow for free camera movement. The player controls a young Pokémon trainer who goes on a quest to catch and train creatures known as Pokémon and win battles against other Pokémon trainers. By defeating opposing Pokémon in turn-based battles, the player's Pokémon gains experience, allowing them to level up and increase their battle statistics, learn new moves, and evolve into more powerful Pokémon. The player can capture wild Pokémon through wild encounters by weakening them in battle and catching them with Poké Balls, adding them to their party. The player can also battle and trade Pokémon with other players via the Nintendo Switch's connectivity features. As is with other Pokémon games, certain Pokémon are only obtainable in either Sword or Shield, and the player will have to trade with others to obtain every Pokémon from both versions.

Pokémon Sword and Shield are set in the Galar Region, inspired by the United Kingdom. Galar consists of numerous cities and towns, with a route system separating major settlements. Random encounters with wild Pokémon typically occur in tall grass or bodies of water along routes and they might chase or run away from the player depending on their disposition. The driving force bringing the player to travel around the Galar Region is to participate in the "Gym Challenge", an open tournament to decide the Galar Region's greatest Pokémon Trainer (the Pokémon League Champion). Eight of the game's cities and towns are homes to stadiums housing "Gym Leaders", powerful Trainers specializing in certain types of Pokémon; beating a Gym Leader will grant the player a "Gym badge". After collecting all eight Badges, the player will be allowed to participate in the "Champion Cup", where they will face off in a tournament against the previously faced Gym Leaders in the Gym Challenge. After they emerge victorious, the player will face the reigning and undefeated Galar League Champion, Leon.

=== New features ===
The games introduce temporary transformations known as Dynamax and Gigantamax. Dynamax allows Pokémon to transform into gigantic-sizes during a Pokémon battle, increase HP, and use special "Max Moves", more powerful attacks that have unique in-battle effects. Gigantamax, which is limited to selected Pokémon, additionally alters Pokémon's physical appearance and replaces one of their Max Move battle techniques with a G-Max Move exclusive to the selected Pokémon. Dynamax and Gigantamax lasts for three turns. Players can battle in teams of four, either with other players or with non-playable characters, in cooperative raids against wild Dynamaxed or Gigantamaxed Pokémon, who have significantly larger health bars and can summon protective barriers to limit damage dealt to them. If players succeed in defeating the Raid Boss, they are granted the opportunity to catch the Pokémon and receive rewards; if four Pokémon on the player's side are knocked out during the battle or enough turns pass in the battle, the player will lose the Raid. Players can use Dynamax during these Raid Battles, though which player can Dynamax on a given turn is rotated once per turn.

The Wild Area is a fully explorable open world area with free camera movement. Pokémon will appear in the game's overworld, and which Pokémon can appear will depend on weather conditions in the Wild Area, which changes every real-world day. The Wild Area's Pokémon fluctuate wildly in terms of their in-game level, and players will be unable to catch Pokémon of a certain level until they obtain certain Gym Badges by progressing through the main story. Players can find collectable items and battle non-playable characters in the Wild Area, and can additionally interact with Raid Dens, which allow players to initiate raid battles with Dynamaxed opponents.

Players can also use a new "Camp" feature, which allows players to set up camps with their Pokémon. Players can play and interact with their Pokémon in the camps, and can additionally use food items to prepare curry. Curry can be used to increase various statistics associated with the Pokémon, such as their friendship with the player, as well as giving them experience points. Depending on the difficulty of the curry recipe and ingredients used by the player, the curry will have a different final ranking, which will affect the amount of bonuses granted to the player's Pokémon. Players can participate in online multiplayer in camps with up to four players. In multiplayer camps, players can cook curry cooperatively and play with other players' Pokémon.

Other new mechanics include "Poké Jobs," which tasks the player's Pokémon with completing requests around Galar to gain experience or rare items. Regional variants, variations of Pokémon from past games in the series that have different appearances due to regional adaptation, return after being introduced in Pokémon Sun and Moon, which featured regional variants exclusive to the game's main location of Alola. The games additionally have content exclusive to certain versions of the game, with certain Gym Leaders and Pokémon species being available only in Sword or Shield.

=== Connectivity ===
Internet connectivity to other players is supported for functionality such as trades, battles, and encountering other trainers in the Wild Area; these functions however require a paid subscription to the Nintendo Switch Online subscription service. Sword and Shield only support direct game-to-game connectivity between themselves. The games are also compatible with Pokémon Home, an online cloud storage service for storing Pokémon, released in February 2020. Supported Pokémon can be transferred to the games from the Nintendo 3DS app Pokémon Bank, Pokémon Go, Pokémon: Let's Go, Pikachu! and Let's Go, Eevee!, Pokémon Brilliant Diamond and Shining Pearl, Pokémon Legends: Arceus, and Pokémon Scarlet and Violet via Pokémon Home, while supported Pokémon within Home can be used in Pokémon Champions. Although supported Pokémon can also be transferred into Pokémon Legends: Z-A, these transfers are one-way and renders them unable to return to previous games in the series, Sword and Shield included. If save data is detected on the Nintendo Switch system from Let's Go, Pikachu! or Let's Go, Eevee!. a Pikachu or Eevee that can Gigantamax will be available in Sword and Shield to the player as in-game gift.

== Plot ==
=== Setting ===
Sword and Shield are set in Galar, a fictional region inspired by the United Kingdom, with several of its landmarks resembling places such as Bath, Somerset and York. Within the Galar Region lie countryside towns featuring cottages and Victorian architecture to the south. There are also Industrial Revolution and steampunk references. Many of the region's towns and cities feature Pokémon Gyms stylised like football stadiums, showcasing the games' Dynamax and Gigantamax mechanic. Snow-covered mountains dominate much of the northern areas of the region.

=== Story ===
Similar to many previous games in the Pokémon franchise, the player travels across Galar Region to become the best Pokémon Trainer in the Galar Region, fighting eight powerful Trainers called Gym Leaders and eventually the undefeated Galar League Champion, Leon. Leon is the older brother of Hop, the player's childhood best friend. The player and Hop receive one of three Starter Pokémon: Grookey, Scorbunny, or Sobble from Leon as a gift. Afterward, the two explore a forest called the Slumbering Weald but are driven off by a powerful Pokémon. During their subsequent visit to the region's Pokémon Professor, Magnolia, and her granddaughter Sonia, they convince Leon to endorse the player and Hop to take part in the Gym Challenge. After travelling to the next city to register for the Gym Challenge, they encounter rivals Bede and Marnie, along with Team Yell, a devout group of hooligans who act as Marnie's unintentional fanbase and are determined to stop anyone else from completing the Challenge. The player also meets Rose, who, in addition to endorsing Bede as a Gym Challenger, presides over the Galar League and the region's main energy company, Macro Cosmos.

As their quest continues, the player assists Sonia in her research on two Legendary Pokémon who saved Galar from an ancient crisis called the Darkest Day and deduces that they are the same Pokémon previously encountered in the Slumbering Weald. After beating the eight Gym Leaders, the player makes their way to Wyndon where they win the Champion's Cup, earning an opportunity to battle Leon. The next day, before the final battle between the player and Leon can commence, Rose awakens the Legendary Pokémon Eternatus in an attempt to harness its power to provide unlimited energy to Galar, purposefully triggering the second Darkest Day. The player and Hop secure the aid of the two Legendary Pokémon, Zacian and Zamazenta. The four defeat Rose and Eternatus, after which the player catches Eternatus and Rose hands himself over to the authorities. Three days later, the player faces and defeats Leon in the final battle and becomes the new Galar League Champion.

The game's post-game has the player and Hop confront Sordward and Shielbert, two brothers who attempt to drive Zacian and Zamazenta berserk. The player and Hop capture the two Pokémon and the brothers are arrested. Hop chooses to train to be a Pokémon Professor with Sonia.

== Development ==
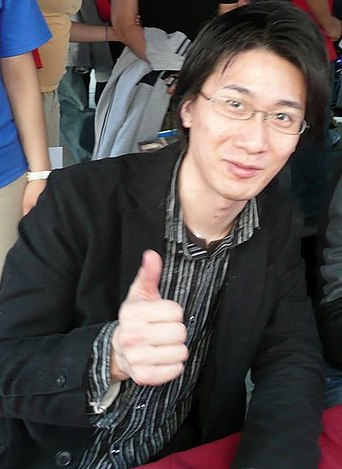
Director Shigeru Ohmori (Pictured in 2007)

=== Conceptualization ===
Conceptualization of Pokémon Sword and Shield began immediately following the completion of Pokémon Sun and Moon in the months preceding their release in November 2016. Shigeru Ohmori, who previously directed Sun and Moon, formed a team to brainstorm ideas for the title. Kazumasa Iwao, director of Pokémon Ultra Sun and Ultra Moon, later joined the project as planning director. One of the first ideas the team had was making Pokémon gigantic in size to capitalize on the Switch's high resolution and TV connectivity. Ohmori suggested a sword and a shield Pokémon to defeat this gigantic Pokémon; these concepts formed the games' titles.

Game Freak approached the games based on the theme of strength and striving to be the "greatest or the strongest"; this was expressed through the Switch's status as the most powerful console to run a Pokémon game, the Dynamax mechanic, and in-game references to various elements of British folklore, featuring giants and other mythical creatures. The concept of "growing and evolving" is an important theme in the games, and it was heavily emphasized in the story.

=== Production ===
Full production began in September 2017. Approximately 1,000 people from multiple companies were involved in the development, marketing, localization, and public relations. Around 200 Game Freak employees worked directly on the games, while about 100 Creatures Inc. employees worked on 3D modeling. An additional 100 worked on debugging and game testing. Game Freak assembled a small team to systematically plan and design the game, enabling them to seamlessly incorporate all desired elements; this approach replaced their previous iterative method, which became impractical due to the complexities of the game's 3D graphics.

Before developing the games, Game Freak worked on Pokémon: Let's Go, Pikachu! and Let's Go, Eevee! as a research project to study the Switch, incorporating a similar code base structure for Sword and Shield. The developers explored various ways to improve and innovate the traditional random encounter mechanic, and after several experiments, they redesigned it to have the player encounter Pokémon freely roaming around the environment. Similarly, they considered allowing the player to freely control the camera to enhance the games' exploration experience, before consulting the staff members in the form of an internal debate, and it was ultimately included.

With the transition to the Switch from the previous iteration, Game Freak had to meticulously design Pokémon models from scratch to adapt them to the higher fidelity and more expressive graphics of the Switch when compared to the Nintendo 3DS. The Pokémon design process involved planners and concept designers creating settings for each Pokémon, which were compiled into a text file outlining the vision for each Pokémon's placement in the game. They designed the Wild Area as a "wide-open space" that is different from the traditional route systems and is constantly changing where "it would be interesting to come back every day and see what has changed—something that would feel different each time."

Go Ichinose and Minako Adachi composed the music, incorporating elements of UK rock music; a track was composed by Toby Fox, creator of Undertale. Ohmori stated that they included fairly short loop tunes for the route music, as opposed to the longer, more dynamic songs in the Wild Area. The games are the first Pokémon games with a title theme that features lyrics.

=== "Cutting" Pokémon ===
Unlike previous core series games, many pre-existing Pokémon are not available in Sword and Shield, and only Pokémon that appear in the Galar region can be transferred from previous titles via Pokémon Home. Producer Junichi Masuda addressed this as a potential issue in a 2018 interview with GameSpot, saying that "it does get complicated when you talk about the details and we're still figuring it out, but we do have plans to find ways to let players use their Pokémon in the next game." In 2019, he explained that the sheer number of Pokémon, combined with the need to produce assets for new features such as the Dynamaxing mechanic, and maintaining a good game balance and high quality standard made it infeasible to include all pre-existing Pokémon without extensively lengthening development time. He stated all three companies involved in the development, Nintendo, Game Freak, and The Pokémon Company, agreed to reduce the games' amount of Pokémon.

== Release and marketing ==
Sword and Shield were first teased through a special message by The Pokémon Company president Tsunekazu Ishihara during Nintendo's E3 2017 presentation, where Ishihara mentioned that Game Freak was working on a new core series Pokémon role-playing game for the Nintendo Switch but that it would not be released for more than a year. During a press conference held by The Pokémon Company in Japan on 30 May 2018, Game Freak announced that the games would be released on Switch in the second half of 2019. The games were fully unveiled in a special Nintendo Direct presentation on 27 February 2019, introducing the games' region and starter Pokémon. The presentation coincided with Pokémon Day, a fan celebration of Pokémon on the anniversary of the Japanese release of Pokémon Red and Green. A second Nintendo Direct about the games was held on 5 June 2019, and it further revealed the games' new features, characters, and Pokémon. A release date of 15 November 2019, was also announced as part of this presentation.

Game Freak intentionally limited the number of new Pokémon they revealed through promotional materials to encourage players to discover them in-game. For the reveals of new Pokémon, several promotional stunts were used. An event in September involving the a glitched graphic on the official Pokémon website led to the reveal of the Pokémon Sirfetch'd. A 24-hour livestream released in October, set in the games' Glimwood Tangle location, led to the reveal of a regional variant for the Pokémon Ponyta.

A promotional crossover between Sword and Shield and Tetris 99 occurred from 8–11 November, during which a limited-time unlockable theme based on the games was available. A web app was also released, allowing the viewer to explore the Wild Area online. In Super Smash Bros. Ultimate, an online tournament themed around Pokémon was held from 15 to 18 November to promote Sword and Shield's release, while an event occurred from 22 to 27 November, with some Pokémon from the games being available as collectible spirits.

=== Leaks ===
Prior to the release of the games, images showcasing Pokémon featured in the games, including various unreleased designs, were leaked via a Discord chat, and subsequently spread over the internet. The Pokémon Company filed a lawsuit against the leakers, having identified four Discord accounts associated with the leaks. A further request for a subpoena was issued by The Pokémon Company against Discord and image board website 4chan, requesting information on those who leaked information regarding the games. The claim was settled in 2021. The leakers were required to individually pay US$150,000 to the company. A Portuguese website, which also published a series of leaks prior to the games' release, was blacklisted by Nintendo.

A believed early build of the games, believed to be dated from sometime in 2018, was leaked by a hacker who breached Nintendo's servers. The build was distributed around various internet forums, such as 4chan, following the release of the game. The build features numerous Pokémon cut from the final game's release, such as Greninja and Ekans, a form of the Pokémon Rayquaza, and several other Pokémon. Various visual aspects were unfinished, as were several models for the scrapped Pokémon. The game's Wild Area was also incomplete, and various music tracks had different variations to the final release. When asked about the build, The Pokémon Company said it would "not comment on leaks and speculation," though the build was widely believed to be an actual early build of the games by many.

=== Expansion pass ===
During the Pokémon Direct on 9 January 2020, an expansion pass was announced consisting of two parts, The Isle of Armor, and The Crown Tundra, and they were released on 17 June 2020 and 22 October 2020, respectively. The expansion pass added additional storylines, locations, characters, new and returning Pokémon species, and other features not present in the base game. A physical bundle, which included both expansions as well as the base game, was released on 6 November 2020.

== Reception ==
=== Critical response ===
Reception

Aggregate scores
Aggregator	Score
Metacritic	80/100
OpenCritic	65% recommend

Review scores
Publication	Score
Destructoid	7.5/10
Easy Allies	7.0/10
Eurogamer	3/5
Game Informer	8.75/10
GameRevolution	7/10
GameSpot	9/10
IGN	9.3/10
Shacknews	8/10

Reception of the games was largely positive. (Note: Attributed to multiple references:) According to the review aggregator website Metacritic, Sword and Shield received "generally favourable" reviews from critics, based on 87 critic reviews for Pokémon Sword and 89 critic reviews for Pokémon Shield. Fellow review aggregator OpenCritic assessed that the games received strong approval, being recommended by 65% of critics.

Critics praised Sword and Shield's gameplay, exploration, and mechanics. (Note: Attributed to multiple references:) Game Informer critic Brian Shea praised the games for their captivating battle mechanics and sense of exploration. Similarly, Casey DeFreitas of IGN praised their engaging gameplay, complemented by compelling battle and exploration experiences. Writing for GameSpot, Kallie Plagge praised the dynamic exploration aspect and streamlined gameplay. Just Lunning, writing for Inverse, similarly responded positively to the games. They stated that despite the cuts to the amount of Pokémon featured in the games, the games had improved various quality of life aspects, allowing for the games to be more accessible to new players.

Lowell Bell, writing for The Escapist, praised the games' gameplay, but felt the games lacked difficulty. They additionally criticised the games' story, believing Chairman Rose's plot to be illogical and that several story beats were not given enough weight. Alex Olney of Nintendo Life enjoyed the game and praised various new aspects of the game, such as the new Pokémon, quality of life improvements, and the Wild Area. Despite this, he felt that the game did not take full advantage of the Nintendo Switch's more advanced hardware, and found various visual aspects underwhelming. Alex Donaldson, writing for VG247, responded positively to the game, finding it charming and believing the game to successfully encapsulate various aspects of the series. He criticised various incomplete or mediocre aspects of the game, believing that they prevented the game from reaching its full potential.

Some critics felt that Sword and Shield lacked in depth and innovation. (Note: Attributed to multiple references:) In their review for Eurogamer, Chris Tapsell criticised the games for their lack of depth, absence of complex dungeons and intricate lore, limited exploration option, and a restricted Pokédex, creating an illusion of scale and ambition that ultimately fails to provide a satisfying Pokémon experience of depth and substance that characterized previous iterations. In their GQ review, James Grebey and Tom Philip criticised their lack of challenge, depth, and innovation, expressing disappointment in the games' execution and their failure to fully utilize the capabilities of the Switch. Mack Ashworth of GameRevolution cited the subpar visuals and mediocre story execution, and he compared the games' underperformed, inferior visuals to other top Switch games.

Chris Carter's review for Destructoid praised Pokémon Shield's visuals and being able to see Pokémon roaming in the overworld but criticised the lack of a Global Trade System and said parts of the game "are missing a lot of emotion and soul".

Donovan Erskine when writing for Shacknews said that the implementation of quality of life features make the games "the most accessible and palatable in the saga" and praised the Wild Area and gyms. However Erskine lamented the games performance problems (such as its frame rate) and the games story.

Ben Moore writing for Easy Allies said the games are "largely enjoyable", though critiqued beloved Pokémon not being in the games, a "mediocre" story and repetition from prior games in the Pokémon series.

=== Controversy ===
The decision to exclude many pre-existing Pokémon in the games drew outrage from many fans, who referred to it as "Dexit", a portmanteau of "Pokédex" and "Brexit" (tying in with the Galar region's British theme), and created the hashtag "#BringBackNationalDex" on social media. with some fans calling for the games to be delayed until all of the Pokémon could be added.

Writing for Polygon, Patricia Hernandez commented that "to some degree, the backlash makes sense" while adding that it had "gotten out of hand". Alex Donaldson of VG247 noted that feature creep—where an increase in new features over time may lead to removal of previous ones—had finally reached Pokémon, and long-overlooked design shortcomings of Game Freak were brought to the forefront as a result. Kotaku's Gita Jackson summarized the backlash as "the tension of a desire to indulge in nostalgia against a desire to experience more complexity." Joe Merrick, the webmaster of fansite Serebii, considered the controversy to have caused the most unrest among Pokémon fans since the troubled launch of Pokémon Bank in 2013.

Producer of the games Junichi Masuda formally responded to the controversy on 28 June 2019, two weeks later, expressing appreciation for the love and passion shown by fans. He reiterated that the removal of certain Pokémon was a difficult decision to make and that they would be available in different games in the future. Michael McWhertor of Polygon noted that while Masuda's statement acknowledged the fans' discontent, it "did not amount to much".

Additional controversy came from data miners accusing Game Freak of reusing the same models and animations from the 3DS games, resulting in the games being review bombed on Metacritic and the hashtag #GameFreakLied trending on Twitter. Game Freak denied this, stating that these elements were in fact redesigned.

=== Sales ===
In Japan, Sword and Shield sold two million copies during their first three days on sale, 1.36 million retail copies alone, surpassing Super Smash Bros. Ultimate as the fastest-selling Switch games in that region. In the US, they sold more than two million copies in their opening weekend. During its opening weekend, Sword and Shield had sold more than six million copies worldwide, surpassing Super Smash Bros. Ultimate as the fastest-selling Switch games. Pokémon Scarlet and Violet managed to sell more copies and became the fastest-selling switch game, surpassing Sword and Shield. As of May 2025, the games had sold 26.72 million copies worldwide, becoming the third best-selling titles in the Pokémon video game series, behind Pokémon Red and Blue and Pokémon Scarlet and Violet.

=== Awards ===
List of awards and nominations for Pokémon Sword and Pokémon Shield
Year	Award	Category	Result	Ref.
2019	Game Critics Awards	Best Role-Playing Game	Nominated	
2019	Game Critics Awards	Best Family/Social Game	Nominated	
2019	Gamescom	Best Role Playing Game	Nominated	
2019	Gamescom	Best Nintendo Switch Game	Nominated	
2019	Titanium Awards	Best Family/Social Game	Nominated	
2020	New York Game Awards	Central Park Children's Zoo Award for Best Kids Game	Nominated	
2020	New York Game Awards	Tin Pan Alley Award for Best Music in a Game	Nominated	
2020	23rd Annual D.I.C.E. Awards	Role-Playing Game of the Year	Nominated	
2020	NAVGTR Awards	Game, Franchise Family	Nominated	
2020	SXSW Gaming Awards	Trending Game of the Year	Won	
2020	Famitsu Dengeki Game Awards 2019	Game of the Year	Won	
2020	Famitsu Dengeki Game Awards 2019	Best RPG	Won	
