= Pokémon the Series: Sun & Moon – Ultra Adventures =

Twenty-first season of the Pokémon animated television series

- Season 21
- Pokémon the Series: Sun & Moon – Ultra Adventures international logo
- No. of episodes: 49 (Japanese version); 48 (English version)

Release
- Original network: TV Tokyo
- Original release: October 5, 2017 – October 14, 2018

Season chronology
- ← Previous; Sun & Moon Next → Ultra Legends

Pokémon the Series: Sun & Moon – Ultra Adventures is the twenty-first season of the Pokémon anime series and the second season of Pokémon the Series: Sun & Moon, known in Japan as Pocket Monsters: Sun & Moon (ポケットモンスター サン&ムーン, Poketto Monsutā: San & Mūn).

The season follows Ash Ketchum as he continues attending the Pokémon School in the Alola region with Lillie, Lana, Mallow, Kiawe, and Sophocles.

The season originally aired in Japan from October 5, 2017, to October 14, 2018, on TV Tokyo, and in the United States from March 24, 2018, to February 23, 2019, on Disney XD.

== Episode list ==
Jap. overall (Note: The English episode numbers are based on their first airing in the United States on Disney XD. Other English-speaking nations largely follow either this order or the Japanese order.)	Eng. overall	No. in season	English title Japanese title	Original release date	English air date
985	979	1	"A Dream Encounter!" (Satoshi and Hoshigumo! Strange Meetings!!); Transliteration: "Satoshi to Hoshigumo! Fushigina deai!!" (Japanese: サトシとほしぐも! 不思議な出会い!!)	October 5, 2017	March 24, 2018
After a strange dream involving the Legendary Pokémon Solgaleo and Lunala, Ash has a hard time waking up. On his way to school, he's sidetracked by Tapu Koko, who guides him to a little Pokémon that looks like a cloud of stars and that Rotom can't identify. Lillie nicknames it Nebby, and Ash remembers his dream: he had promised to take care of it. This attracts the attention of Lillie's mother, Lusamine, the head of the Aether Foundation. She and her colleagues come to meet Nebby and offer to care for and research this unknown Pokémon. However, Ash is resolute in his promise, so Nebby's true identity is a mystery for now.
986	980	2	"Now You See Them, Now You Don't!" (Hoshigumo Panic! A Sudden Teleport!!); Transliteration: "Hoshigumo panikku! Terepōto wa totsuzen ni!!" (Japanese: ほしぐもパニック! テレポートは突然に!!)	October 12, 2017	March 25, 2018
The Pokémon School class is sculpting with clay today, but while our heroes muse about various Pokémon and places, they disappear one by one, first appearing at the scenes of their musings, then reappearing back at school. They soon realize Nebby used Teleport to take them to the places and Pokémon they were thinking about. Meanwhile, Team Rocket is determined to catch Nebby. They succeed when, thanks to Nebby's Teleport Ash and Pikachu visit the places the rest of the class saw earlier and finally wind up at Team Rocket's location, Thanks again to Teleport, Team Rocket is sent back to Bewear and Nebby makes its way back to Ash, all by itself.
987	981	3	"Deceiving Appearances!" (The Shapeshifting Metamon, Find that 'Mon!); Transliteration: "Henshin Metamon, sagasundamon!" (Japanese: 変身メタモン、探すんだモン!)	October 19, 2017	March 26, 2018
Our heroes visit Aether Paradise, part of the Aether Foundation run by Lillie's mother, Lusamine. An impressive variety of Pokémon live in the conservation area, including a group of Ditto who need their shots. Professor Burnet recruits Ash and friends to help with the vaccinations while Lusamine is busy on the phone, but one of the Ditto escapes and leads our heroes on a merry chase as it keeps transforming. They eventually catch it when it disguises itself as Snowy, and Lillie realizes she cannot touch it. Meanwhile, Team Rocket has scored jobs at Aether Paradise, and they are hot on Nebby's trail when they stumble into Faba's mysterious laboratory.
988	982	4	"A Masked Warning!" (Glazio and Silvady! The Mask of Punishment!!); Transliteration: "Gurajio to Shiruvadi! imashime no kamen!!" (Japanese: グラジオとシルヴァディ! 戒めの仮面!!)	October 26, 2017	March 27, 2018
When Ash gives Lycanroc a bath, an accidental splash of dirty water unleashes Lycanroc's surprisingly red-hot temper! Then, when our hero wonders aloud what Gladion is up to, Nebby teleports Ash and Pikachu to his location. They meet Silvally, a Pokémon created to defeat Ultra Beasts, and Gladion is convinced that Nebby is one. Suspicious, Gladion wants to know who and what Ash is, and our hero suggests a battle so he can find out, Ash's Dusk-Form Lycanroc faces off against Gladion's Silvally. Lycanroc battles magnificently, but another temper tantrum betrays its inexperience, and Silvally wins. However, Gladion decides Ash is trustworthy, and their friendship starts to grow.
989	983	5	"Night of a Thousand Poses!" (Full-Force Pose Sleepover!); Transliteration: "Zenryoku pozu deo tomarikai!" (Japanese: ゼンリョクポーズでお泊まり会!)	November 2, 2017	March 28, 2018
Our heroes are having a sleepover at Professor Kukui's house, and Professor Burnet agrees to join them. Everyone has a good time, but there are a couple of hiccups: during a game of Z-Move poses, Kiawe accidentally unleashes Turtonator's Inferno Overdrive in the living room, and then Professor Burnet's Munchlax eats everything she cooked for dinner. That night, when Lillie has trouble sleeping, she talks with Professor Burnet, who offers some advice about her family. The next day, Nebby unexpectedly whisks her away to visit Gladion and his partner, the mysterious Silvally, who leaves her terrified and apparently unable to touch Pokémon again, even Snowy.
990 (Note: This is considered to be the 1,000th episode of Pokémon as recognized by The Pokémon Company in Japan.)	984	6	"Mission: Total Recall!" (Lilie and Silvady, the Resurrected Memory!); Transliteration: "Rīrie to Shiruvadi yomi ga eru kioku!" (Japanese: ゼンリョクポーズでお泊まり会!)	November 9, 2017	March 29, 2018
Lillie is determined to conquer her fear of touching Pokémon once and for all. With Nebby's help, she embarks on a journey to recall the memories behind her fear. However, Faba, who was responsible for Silvally's creation in the first place, wants none of it. Vowing to make sure Lillie never remembers her past, Faba captures her, and she is again filled with fear. But Silvally rescues Lillie, and when she remembers that it was the one who saved her in the past, her fear of touching Pokémon has finally vanished.
991	985	7	"Faba's Revenge!" (Sauboh's Counterattack! The Kidnapped Hoshigumo!!); Transliteration: "Zaobo no gyakushu! sarawareta Hoshigumo!" (Japanese: ザオボーの逆襲! さらわれたほしぐも!)	November 16, 2017	March 30, 2018
While our heroes celebrate Lillie's being able to touch Pokémon once again, a disgraced Faba is determined to prove himself to Lusamine by summoning an Ultra Beast—the same one that threatened Lillie years before. He kidnaps Nebby and convinces it to teleport him into his research lab at Aether Paradise. Ash, Gladion, Lillie, and Lusamine go after Faba, arriving just as a panicked Nebby evolves into a chrysalis and the Ultra Wormhole begins to open. Emerging a Ultra Beast named Nihilego who attacked Lillie in the past, and begins to attack Lillie, but Lusamine throws herself in front of her daughter, Nihilego engulfs her instead and takes her back through the wormhole, much to Lillie's big worried and horror.
992	986	8	"Family Determination!" (Effortful Lilie! A Determined Runaway Act!); Transliteration: "Ganba Ririe! Ketsui no iede!" (Japanese: がんばリーリエ! 決意の家出!!)	November 23, 2017	March 31, 2018
Stunned after Lusamine's disappearance through an Ultra Wormhole, our heroes want to help get her back. But Gladion insists it is a family matter and he and Lillie set out on their own rescue mission. The Pokémon School class still wants to help, though, so Kahuna Hala directs them to the Altar of the Sunne on Poni Island. Meanwhile, nearing the altar, Gladion and Lillie encounter a Totem Kommo-o. With Snowy and Silvally, they defeat the Dragon-type Pokémon. When the siblings are rejoined by the rest of the gang, Ash again tries to convince Gladion to let everyone help. When Lillie agrees, Gladion finally understands everything.
993	987	9	"Revealing the Stuff of Legend!" (The Altar of the Sun! Solgaleo Descends!!); Transliteration: "Nichirin no saidan! Sorugareo kōrin!" (Japanese: 日輪の祭壇! ソルガレオ降臨!!)	November 30, 2017	April 7, 2018
Our heroes are all gathered at the Altar of the Sunne, along with all four of Alola's Island Guardians. Lillie and Gladion ask the Island Guardians for help to rescue their mother. Tapu Koko and the others perform a ritual that enables little Nebby to evolve into the mighty Solgaleo, one of the Legendary Pokémon of Alola. At Solgaleo's invitation, the Pokémon School students climb onto its back. The Island Guardians upgrade Ash's Z-Ring into a Z-Power Ring, and with the help of a new Z-Move, Solgaleo opens an Ultra Wormhole and carries them through.
994	988	10	"Rescuing the Unwilling!" (Hurry Up! Operation: Rescue Lusamine!!); Transliteration: "Isoge! Ruzamīne kyūshutsu dai sakusen!!" (Japanese: 急げ! ルザミーネ救出大作戦!!)	December 7, 2017	April 14, 2018
On the other side of the Ultra Wormhole, the gang finds the captured Lusamine, but are shocked to find Nihilego is controlling her mind and she wants nothing to do with them. As Ash, Lillie and their friends attempt to rescue her, their Pokémon spring into action, but so do Lusamine's Pokémon, who are also under Nihilego's control. Lillie gathers her courage and reaches out to her mother's Clefable, recalling the fun they had together long ago. Her reassuring persistence pays off, and Clefable breaks free of Nihilego's control. Meanwhile, riding on Solgaleo's back, Ash races to find Lusamine and free her from Nihilego's control.
995	989	11	"10,000,000 Reasons to Fight!" (Shine, Z-Power Ring! Super Full-Force 10,000,000 Volts!!); Transliteration: "Kagayake Z pawa ringu! cho zenryoku no 1000 man boruto!!" (Japanese: 輝けZパワーリング！超ゼンリョクの1000まんボルト！！)	December 14, 2017	April 21, 2018
Our heroes are battling hard against a group of mind-controlled Pokémon and Lusamine is still resisting rescue. Lillie pleads with her mother to wake up, but Gladion realizes the attacks will not stop until Nihilego is defeated. Gladion and his Pokémon provide a distraction while Ash and Pikachu use a most powerful Z-Move: 10,000,000 Volt Thunderbolt. This finally defeats Nihilego and Lusamine is herself. Returning through the Ultra Wormhole, our heroes and Lusamine are reunited with Professor Kukui and Professor Burnet.
996	990 (Note: This is considered to be the 1,000th episode of Pokémon as recognized by The Pokémon Company International.)	12	"The Professors' New Adventure!" (Thank You, Solgaleo! You are Our Hoshigumo!!); Transliteration: "Arigato Sorugareo! oretachi no Hoshigumo!!" (Japanese: ありがとうソルガレオ！俺たちのほしぐも！！)	December 21, 2017	April 28, 2018
Solgaleo mysteriously disappears as our heroes return to the Pokémon School, where Lillie thanks everyone for their help saving her mother. Later, during a walk on the beach, Professor Kukui proposes to Professor Burnet and she accepts, but they are not planning a wedding ceremony. Ash and his friends decide to organize a surprise ceremony, and with the assistance of Principal Oak, it is successfully held. Afterwards, Lusamine asks the Pokémon School class to join the Ultra Guardians, a group that will protect Alola from Ultra Beasts. Just after the bouquet toss, Solgaleo appears. Ash gets his wish and thanks the Legendary Pokémon for all its help, and he looks forward to seeing it again someday. At the end of the episode an Ultra Beast is shown escaping through the wormhole.
997	991	13	"Let Sleeping Pokémon Lie!" (The Strong Sleeper, Nekkoala's Secret!); Transliteration: "Neru ko wa tsuyoi, nekkoala no himitsu!" (Japanese: 寝る子は強い、ネッコアラの秘密！)	December 28, 2017	May 5, 2018
Our heroes are curious about the origins (and sleep habits) of Principal Oak's Komala. After telling the students how they met, Samson shows off Komala's impressive skill at battling in its sleep! They get another lesson in sleep when Jigglypuff shows up at the Pokémon School! As always, its song sends everyone to sleep, and they wake with angry scribbles on their faces…everyone except Komala. Jigglypuff keeps coming back and gets angrier and angrier when Komala won't wake up and listen. That gives Samson an idea … when Jigglypuff returns, Komala uses the Sleep Song and makes Jigglypuff fall asleep, and Komala doodles on its face! Rather than being grumpy when it wakes up, Jigglypuff seems to think this is hilarious and Komala has a new friend.
998	992	14	"The Dex Can't Help It!" (Rotom, Can't Stop the Form Change!); Transliteration: "Rotomu, Forumu Chenji Ga Tomaranai!" (Japanese: ロトム、フォルムチェンジが止まらない！)	January 11, 2018	May 12, 2018
Rotom Dex is house-sitting while Ash and the professors go shopping. But chaos ensues when a washing machine is mistakenly delivered, with a Wash Rotom inside! Somehow, the Wash Rotom ends up inside Ash's Pokédex and Rotom Dex takes its place in the washing machine. After a series of accidental form changes, and even some time spent inside a TV, Rotom Dex yearns to be back inside the comfort of the Pokédex. It finally succeeds, but not for long—after a big shock from Pikachu, Rotom Dex accidentally inhabits the entire Pokémon Center!
999	993	15	"Fighting Back The Tears!" (Don't Cry, Hidoide!); Transliteration: "Nakanaide Hidoide!" (Japanese: 泣かないでヒドイデ！)	January 18, 2018	May 19, 2018
After a day of shopping, Team Rocket encounters Mareanie's first love and mentor, a Mareanie that still has feelings for its former protégé. Filled with jealousy, it evolves into a Toxapex and poisons James! In his poisoned stupor, James decides Mareanie should be with Toxapex instead of with him. When Mareanie overhears this, its sadness causes it to run away. But Toxapex can't bear to see Mareanie cry, and it challenges James to a duel to win Mareanie back. After what turns out to be an underwhelming battle, James is victorious and Mareanie joyously reunites with him.
1000	994	16	"Tasting the Bitter With The Sweet!" (Mao and Suiren: Bittersweet Memories!); Transliteration: "Mao soshite Suiren : Amai omoide!" (Japanese: マオそしてスイレン: 甘い思い出!)	January 25, 2018	July 2, 2018
When Harper and Sarah tell Lana that a Pokémon saved them after they got lost in the woods, Mallow remembers the same thing happened to her and Lana when they were younger! The two friends decide it's time to find this Pokémon, nicknamed Grandpa Forest, and offer it their thanks. Always up for an adventure, Ash and Pikachu tag along. Our heroes soon learn that Grandpa Forest is a Drampa, and when they find its favorite bittersweet Haban Berry trees, they realize they're on the right track. Then, after a brief scuffle with Team Rocket, Lana and Mallow joyfully reunite with their old friend.
1001	995	17	"Getting A Jump On The Competition!" (Lilie is Soaring Through the Air! The PokéSled Jump Tournament!); Transliteration: "kūki o tsukinuketeimasu ！ pokeddojanputōnamento ！" (Japanese: 空気を突き抜けています！ ポケッドジャンプトーナメント！)	February 1, 2018	July 9, 2018
The Pokémon School students, Professor Kukui and Kahuna Hala are visiting Mount Lanakila on Ula'ula Island, where they meet Cerah, a star of the Pokémon Sled Jump event. With the help of her Alolan Ninetales, Cerah introduces our heroes to the sport, and Lillie and Snowy are excited to try it together—even regaining their confidence after crashing during a practice run. The two of them fly high in the competition, and Snowy shows off a new move: Aurora Veil. Although Kahuna Hala and his newly evolved Crabominable are the winners, everyone agrees that Lillie's jump was excellent, and she's excited to keep working with Snowy as a team
1002	996	18	"A Mission of Ultra Urgency!" (Set Off! Our Ultra Guardians!); Transliteration: "shutsudō! boku-ra no urutoragādianzu! !" (Japanese: 出動！ぼくらのウルトラガーディアンズ！！)	February 8, 2018	July 16, 2018
Lusamine gives our heroes their first assignment as the Ultra Guardians: catch an Ultra Beast named Buzzwole, who emerged from an Ultra Wormhole on Melemele Island. Equipped with the latest technology, the Ultra Guardians locate the Pokémon, whose aggressive behavior seems to reflect its anxiety about being in a strange world. Ash and Kiawe notice Buzzwole has a habit of striking heroic poses—so they join right in! With Buzzwole's guard down, Ash catches it in a Beast Ball, and it's soon returned to its own world through the reopened Ultra Wormhole.
1003	997	19	"Acting True to Form!" (The Evil Nyarth is an Alolan Nyarth!?); Transliteration: "aku no nyasu wa arora nyasu!?" (Japanese: 悪のニャースはアローラニャース！？)	February 15, 2018	July 23, 2018
When Team Rocket encounters an Alolan Meowth, Jessie and James admire its clever demeanor—but our Meowth knows from experience that this lookalike is only looking out for number one! To Meowth's chagrin, Jessie and James want Alolan Meowth to join Team Rocket, and it even comes up with a plan to catch Pikachu once and for all. But when the plan's set into motion, Alolan Meowth is nowhere to be found! When it reappears at Team Rocket Headquarters after ingratiating itself with the Boss, Jessie and James realize they've been had and Meowth is filled with jealousy!
1004	998	20	"Pushing the Fiery Envelope!" (Blaze, Nyabby! Overthrow Gaogaen!!); Transliteration: "moeagare nyabby! dato gaogaen!!" (Japanese: 燃え上がれニャビー！打倒ガオガエン！！)	February 22, 2018	July 30, 2018
The mysterious Mask Royal and his partner Incineroar are the stars in the Battle Royal, an Alolan tradition in which four Pokémon battle until the last one standing is the winner. Ash, watching on TV, can't wait to get in on the action—and the next day, he gets his chance! At the Battle Royal Dome, Ash's Litten charges right into the ring, determined to take on the impressive Incineroar. Royal Mask accepts Litten's challenge and invites Sophocles and Kiawe to round out the four. He defeats them all, but Litten is fired up—and during an unexpected rematch the next day, it evolves into Torracat!
1005	— (Note: This episode was pulled from rotation in international broadcasts due to a scene in which Ash wears dark face paint supposedly resembling blackface in order to imitate the appearance of a Passimian.)	21	"Satoshi and Nagetukesaru! A Touchdown of Friendship!!"; Transliteration: "Satoshi to Nagetsukesaru! Yujo no Tacchidaun!!" (Japanese: サトシとナゲツケサル！友情のタッチダウン！！)	March 1, 2018	Unaired
1006	999	22	"Turning Heads and Training Hard!" (Ilima and Eievui Make Their Entrance!!); Transliteration: "Irima to ibui ma irima su!!" (Japanese: イリマとイーブイまイリマす！！)	March 8, 2018	August 6, 2018
The Pokémon School is thrilled to have a surprise visit from one of its most accomplished graduates, Ilima! Ash and Lillie are amazed to hear the many stories about Ilima, and they're determined to see if those legends are true. Team Skull is also interested in Ilima, but Tupp is more jealous over Ilima's popularity with girls and challenges Ilima to a battle, backed by a huge Team Skull crew! After Ilima and Eevee prove their battling skills by defeating the hapless group, Ash really wants to battle them, too—but that will have to wait for another time.
1007	1000	23	"Smashing with Sketch!" (Smash with Sketch! The Fierce Poké-Ping Pong!!); Transliteration: "Sukecchi de sumasshu! gekito pokepinpon!" (Japanese: スケッチでスマッシュ！激闘ポケピンポン!)	March 15, 2018	August 13, 2018
Our heroes are learning all about Pokémon Ping-Pong, with Ilima showing them the ins and outs of the game. Ilima is competing in an upcoming Pokémon Ping-Pong tournament, where he hopes to settle an old score and defeat Ikari, the winner in previous years. But while Ilima believes that consideration for his Pokémon partner is key to success, Ikari takes a more aggressive strategy. After Ikari berates his partner Mienshao during the heat of the tournament's final game, the two lose coordination, and Ilima and his partner Smeargle emerge victorious!
1008	1001	24	"Love at First Twirl!" (The Lover of Light! Bevenom Spins Round and Round!!); Transliteration: "Pikapika dai suki! kurukuru bebenomu!!" (Japanese: ピカピカだいすき！くるくるベベノム!!)	March 22, 2018	August 25, 2018
A mysterious Pokémon has appeared and happily darts about in the sky above ... and it seems to have taken quite a fancy to Pikachu! Pikachu follows it out of the school, but it accidentally poisons Rowlet when Rowlet thinks that it's attacking Pikachu when they were only playing! While taking Rowlet to get help, they're spotted and chased by Team Rocket, but are rescued by Ash, Torracat and Lycanroc! Lusamine and the Aether Foundation determine that it's an Ultra Beast named Poipole. Lusamine asks Ash to take on the Pokémon as a partner—and our hero happily agrees.
1009	1002	25	"Real Life...Inquire Within!" (Work Experience! 24-Hour Pokémon Center!!); Transliteration: "O shigoto taiken! pokemonsenta 24 ji!" (Japanese: お仕事体験！ポケモンセンター24時!!)	April 5, 2018	September 1, 2018
Ash and friends are looking forward to a day of real-life work experience at the Pokémon Center, but discover that Nurse Joy has come down with a bad cold. The gang take charge of the Pokémon Center for the day, learning the ins and outs of the job, soon discovering just how complicated it can be—and how different Pokémon have different needs. That includes Zipp's Garbodor, who's suffering from a poison blockage. Our heroes spring into action and Garbodor is healed—just as Nurse Joy starts feeling better too.
1010	1003	26	"Rise and Shine, Starship!" (The Shining Starship Tekkaguya!); Transliteration: "Kagayake hoshi fune tekkaguya!" (Japanese: 輝け星舟テッカグヤ!)	April 12, 2018	September 8, 2018
One of Sophocles's favorite fairy tales is "The Celestial Starship," which tells of a brilliant star that landed in a bamboo grove and lived there until it returned to its home on the moon. When our heroes learn of an Ultra Beast named Celesteela who's in a similar situation, they're amazed—but Sophocles isn't surprised at all! The Ultra Guardians spring into action to help Celesteela get home, but they have to be careful, as the Ultra Beast is filled with explosive gas. Thankfully, our heroes' efforts pay off, and Celesteela returns home safely, leaving the bamboo unscathed.
1011	1004	27	"The Young Flame Strikes Back!" (Protect the Ranch! The Blue Flame's Counterattack!!); Transliteration: "Bokujo o mamore gyakushu no aoki hono!!" (Japanese: 牧場を守れ！逆襲の蒼き炎!!)	April 19, 2018	September 15, 2018
A developer named Viren pays an unwelcome visit to Kiawe's family's farm, wanting to buy the land so that he can build a resort hotel. When Kiawe's parents turn him down, Viren turns to shady tactics, first buying land upstream from the farm and cutting off their water supply, and then threatening to unleash his bulldozers! Kiawe makes a deal: if Viren's Electivire can defeat Kiawe's Marowak, his family will sell. Kiawe and Marowak's partnership burns bright and they knock Electivire out with a Z-Move—just before Officer Jenny arrives and arrests Viren for fraud.
1012	1005	28	"Dewpider Ascending!" (Shizukumo, Get Suiren!); Transliteration: "Shizukumo, daze!" (Japanese: シズクモ、スイレンゲットだぜ!)	April 26, 2018	September 22, 2018
On Melemele Island, a wild Dewpider leaves its nest in search of its own pond to call home. Along the way, it gets caught up in confrontations with various Pokémon who don't take kindly to intruders. Dewpider wears a water bubble on its head that lets it breathe on land, so when it sees Lana wearing one of Popplio's balloons on her head, it thinks she's a Dewpider, too! The gang observes and encourages Dewpider as it searches for a new home, battling opponents in the process. When it finally succeeds, it happily begins building its nest, inspired by its new friend Lana.
1013	1006	29	"Sours for the Sweet!" (Ta-ta-ta-dah! Fire it Up, Mao's Family!!); Transliteration: "Panpakapan! Moeyo mao famiri!!" (Japanese: パンパカパーン！燃えよマオファミリー！！)	April 26, 2018	September 29, 2018
The annual Alola Bread Festival is coming up, and Mallow's older brother Ulu has unexpectedly returned home to enter! When Nina from the pancake restaurant stops by to wish Ulu good luck, he vows to win for her sake. But all his sweet Grepa Berries disappear down the throat of a Snorlax, so our heroes jump in to help save his entry. Mallow suggests making jelly from sour Grepa Berries, sweetening it, and spreading it on Ulu's bread... and it works! Ulu's bread wins first prize…but when he discovers Nina's already engaged to someone else, he suddenly takes off again on his cooking journey.
1014	1007	30	"Why Not Give Me a Z-Ring Sometime?" (Rocket-dan's Island-Visiting!? Get the Z-Ring!!); Transliteration: "Rokettodan no shima meguri!? Z ringu o getto seyo!!" (Japanese: ロケット団の島めぐり！？Zリングをゲットせよ！！)	May 3, 2018	October 6, 2018
When James's Mareanie learns a Dark-type move, Team Rocket realizes this could be their chance to use their Dark-type Z-Crystal. The Boss sends them to Ula'ula Island to get a Z-Ring from the kahuna, who's a former associate. Meanwhile, at the library, Acerola tells the story of the Greedy Rapooh—who turns out to be a real Gengar with thieving tendencies, and who steals Team Rocket's Z-Crystal and takes off with Acerola on its back! When Kahuna Nanu sees that Team Rocket is battling to rescue Acerola, who's his niece, he lends them a Z-Ring—and after the battle, Acerola gives them a special Z-Crystal for Mimikyu.
1015	1008	31	"Tough Guy Trials!" (The Super Mean Old Man is an Island King!?); Transliteration: "Cho waru oyaji wa shima kingu!?" (Japanese: ちょーワルおやじはしまキング！？)	May 10, 2018	October 13, 2018
Ash can't contain his excitement as he arrives on Ula'ula Island for his next grand trial. But Nanu, the island kahuna, isn't interested and tries to trick Ash into believing someone else is the kahuna. To Nanu's dismay, Acerola blows his cover and convinces him to grant Ash a "pre-trial" battle. Nanu is convinced Ash isn't ready, but agrees to the battle, and his Krookodile soundly defeats Ash's Lycanroc. But Ash never gives up, and he vows to stay on the island and train harder for a rematch.
1016	1009	32	"Some Kind of Laziness!" (Kapu-Bulul! Intense Lazy Training!!); Transliteration: "Kapu-Bururu! Gu tara mō tokkun!!" (Japanese: カプ・ブルル！ぐーたらモー特訓！！)	May 17, 2018	October 20, 2018
Thanks to Acerola's help, Ash arrives at the Ruins of Abundance, home of Ula'ula Island Guardian Tapu Bulu. Ash wants to train with Tapu Bulu to prepare for his rematch against the Island Kahuna Nanu, and after our hero demonstrates his friendship with his Pokémon, Tapu Bulu engages Ash and Lycanroc in battle—and Lycanroc learns how to use Stone Edge and Rowlet learns Razor Leaf.
1017	1010	33	"A Battle Hand-Off!" (Super Decisive Battle! Pikachu VS Mimikkyu!!); Transliteration: "Sūpā kessen! Pikachū VS Mimikkyu!!" (Japanese: スーパー決戦！ピカチュウVSミミッキュ！！)	May 24, 2018	October 27, 2018
Ash has been training hard, preparing for his rematch against Nanu on Ula'ula Island. But when he tells the kahuna he's ready, Nanu has another idea. Team Rocket has just come looking for "the twerp" so Mimikyu can try out its new Z-Move against Pikachu, so Nanu sends him out to battle them instead! Mimikyu proves to be a powerful opponent, but Pikachu overwhelms the opposition with a new move, Electroweb, and the Z-Move 10,000,000 Volt Thunderbolt. Ash wins, setting the stage for his Ula'ula Island grand trial.
1018	1011	34	"Guiding an Awakening!" (Kuchinashi's Grand Trial! Lugarugan Awakens!!); Transliteration: "Kuchinashi no dai shiren! Lugarugan kakusei!!" (Japanese: クチナシの大試練！ルガルガン覚醒！！)	May 31, 2018	November 3, 2018
Following Ash's victory at the Abandoned Thrifty Megamart, Nanu agrees to battle him in a grand trial, But there's a catch—Ash must defeat three of Nanu's Pokémon using only one of his. He chooses Lycanroc, whose training has paid off, as it quickly defeats Nanu's Krookodile. Next up is Sableye, and Lycanroc lands another win. But when Nanu sends out his Alolan Persian and begins taunting Ash, Lycanroc's temper begins to flare—leading Ash to realize that Lycanroc is channeling the anger into power. Determined, Lycanroc learns the move Counter and defeats Persian. Ash wins a Lycanium Z and his third grand trial.
1019	1012	35	"Twirling with a Bang!" (Ultra Beast Clash! The Great Rumble Crash Operation!!); Transliteration: "Gekitotsu urutorabīsuto! Dondonbachibachi dai sakusen!!" (Japanese: 激激突ウルトラビースト！ドンドンバチバチ大作戦！！)	June 7, 2018	November 10, 2018
Ash is back on Melemele Island, watching a fireworks display with his Pokémon School classmates. Toward the end of the show, a strange creature starts creating even more fireworks—by making its own head explode! The next day, Lusamine summons the Ultra Guardians to deal with this Ultra Beast. When our heroes go after it, they discover a second Ultra Beast, and the two creatures face off, flinging fireworks and sparks around so no one can get close. At Ash's suggestion, the Ultra Guardians stage their own fireworks show, combining their Pokémon's moves into a gorgeous display that distracts the Ultra Beasts long enough to catch them.
1020	1013	36	"Showering the World with Love!" (Minior and Poipole, the Promise that Disappeared into the Starry Sky!); Transliteration: "Meteno to bevenom, hoshizora ni kieta yakusoku!" (Japanese: メテノとベベノム、星空に消えた約束！)	June 14, 2018	November 17, 2018
The Pokémon School students are visiting Hokulani Observatory for a meteor shower—no, it's a Minior shower! The space-dwelling Pokémon fall to the ground, their heavy shells cracking open in a beautiful display of color and light. Poipole helps one orange Minior escape its shell, and they quickly become friends. After the next night's shower, the colorful Pokémon float up into the sky…and gradually disappear, including Poipole's friend. Sophocles's cousin Molayne explains that this is the natural order of things and Sophocles sadly remembers a Minior he befriended years ago, who vanished in the same way.
1021	1014	37	"Not Caving Under Pressure!" (Sandshrew's Storm! Ice Cave Double Battle!!); Transliteration: "Sando no arashi! Kori ana no daburu batoru!!" (Japanese: サンドの嵐！氷穴のダブルバトル！！)	June 28, 2018	November 24, 2018
On their way to the ferry back to Melemele Island, our heroes take a shortcut through a cave. They find an area filled with luminescent moss and Kiawe's overexcited Marowak starts a commotion that separates everyone into groups. While the others try to find their way out, Lillie, Sophocles and Mallow discover a group of Alolan Sandshrew in training. The Sandshrew are threatened by a Tyranitar, but Lillie intervenes. She challenges Tyranitar to a Double Battle and wins with the help of Snowy and the Sandshrew Boss. To show their gratitude, the Sandshrew present Lillie with her very own Icium Z.
1022	1015	38	"A Young Royal Flame Ignites!" (Alola's Young Fire! The Birth of Royal Satoshi!!); Transliteration: "Arora no wakaki hono! Roiyaru Satoshi tanjo!!" (Japanese: アローラの若き炎！ロイヤルサトシ誕生！！)	July 5, 2018	December 1, 2018
Another exciting Battle Royal is under way! It's Royal Mask versus the Revengers, a team known for their blatant rule-breaking. When they're about to unleash a sneak attack on Incineroar, Ash's Torracat charges into the ring with an attack of its own—and "Royal Ash" joins Royal Mask for a tag-team match against the Revengers' Electivire and Magmortar! The Revengers' boss turns out to be Viren, the ruthless developer—which means the Battle Royal Dome itself is on the line! But Torracat and Incineroar prove to be a great team and despite their opponents' unsavory tactics, the Double Royals win the day!
1023	1016	39	"All They Want to Do is Dance Dance!" (Dance Dance in Evolution?); Transliteration: "Dansu dansu de shinka sen ka?" (Japanese: ダンスダンスで進化せんか？)	July 19, 2018	December 8, 2018
Professor Kukui has a new assignment for his class: teaching their Pokémon to dance. The students have many ideas—and varying degrees of success. While Mallow and Steenee are learning the traditional Alola Hula from Anela in the market, Team Rocket spies on them and makes a plan to crash the performance. Sure enough, the villains strike, trapping everyone else in a pair of cages. But Steenee eludes capture and leaps to the top of one cage, stomping with all its might—until it evolves into Tsareena, whose stronger legs make quick work of Team Rocket's gadgets.
1024	1017	40	"Dummy, You Shrunk the Kids!" (Satoshi, Becomes Small); Transliteration: "Satoshi, chīsaku naru" (Japanese: サトシ、ちいさくなる)	July 26, 2018	December 15, 2018
The Pokémon School has a visiting teacher: Faba! When he shows off his invention that can reduce the size of objects for easy storage, it malfunctions and Ash, Lillie and Sophocles are shrunk to tiny size! Faba recruits Rotom Dex to help him repair the machine and meanwhile, our heroes are thrown into a world where everything is gigantic. They eventually reunite with Pikachu, who sneezes on them—causing them to return to normal size. But just when Faba thinks he's fixed his invention, it misfires again…and the result is a towering Togedemaru!
1025	1018	41	"The Shape of Love to Come!" (The Shape of Family, Bevenom's Feelings!); Transliteration: "Kazoku no katachi, bebenomu no kimochi!" (Japanese: 家族のカタチ、ベベノムのキモチ！)	August 2, 2018	December 22, 2018
While out shopping, Ash meets a talented artist named Mina, whose partner Ribombee has an amazing power: it can tell what people and Pokémon are feeling! Poipole is fascinated, too and shows off its own drawing skills to the rest of the Pokémon School class. It's thrilled to draw symbols representing its love for its "Alolan family," but after a mysterious dream, its artwork takes on a different, darker tone. Although Poipole's motivations remain unclear, our heroes reassure it that they're behind it no matter what. In the meantime, though, the mystery continues to deepen...
1026	1019	42	"The Long Vault Home!" (Leap and Climb, Tundetunde!); Transliteration: "Toned no botte, Tundetunde!" (Japanese: トンデノボッテ、ツンデツンデ！)	August 9, 2018	December 29, 2018
While practicing their vaulting skills during gym class, Ash and friends compete to see who can jump the highest. The next day, an Ultra Beast named Stakataka appears in Alola—and our heroes initially mistake it for a giant vaulting box! Realize its true identity, they spring into action as the Ultra Guardians. After multiple failed attempts to get Stakataka into a Beast Ball, the Ultra Beast finally recognizes that our heroes are trying to help, and it agrees to be caught so it can be returned to its home world.
1027	1020	43	"I Choose Paradise!" (I Choose Here! Pokémon Hot Spring Paradise!!); Transliteration: "Koko ni kimeta! Pokemon yukemuri paradaisu!!" (Japanese: ココにきめた！ポケモン湯けむりパラダイス！！)	August 16, 2018	January 12, 2019
The Ultra Guardians are beside themselves with excitement, as Lusamine has booked them a day at the Pokémon Paradise Resort—and the hardworking Ride Pokémon are tagging along, too! Everyone enjoys the spa's relaxing amenities, but Team Rocket shows up in disguise with other plans: stealing all the Pokémon they can! Fortunately, the Ride Pokémon have none of it, and they make sure to dash the troublemakers' ambitions. Our heroes finish their spa day in total luxury, while Team Rocket ends up stuck in the mud with Bewear...
1028	1021	44	"Filling the Light with Darkness!" (Alola's Crisis! The Darkness that Eats Radiance!!); Transliteration: "Arōra no kiki! Kagayaki o kurau yami!!" (Japanese: アローラの危機！かがやきを喰らう闇！！)	August 23, 2018	January 19, 2019
For some reason, Professors Kukui and Burnet are feeling extremely listless, and when Ash gets to school, he discovers that the adults in his friends' lives are in the same boat! The Aether Foundation team has a theory, but they're listless too, so Ash leads the Ultra Guardians (now including Gladion) to investigate. The culprit seems to be something on the other side of an Ultra Wormhole, draining all the energy from the Ultra Auras. Our heroes track down the wormhole and they're excited to see the Legendary Pokémon Lunala emerge—but a mysterious and frightening creature is right on its tail!
1029	1022	45	"Full Moon and Many Arms!" (Lunala VS UB:BLACK! A Full Moon Battle!!); Transliteration: "Runaāra tai UB: Burakku! Mangetsu no tatakai!!" (Japanese: ルナアーラ対UB:BLACK！満月の戦い！！)	August 30, 2018	January 26, 2019
The Ultra Guardians spring into action to protect Lunala from the mysterious creature who has chased it through the Ultra Wormhole, UB Black (as Lusamine later calls it) drains the power from Lunala's Ultra Aura, then fastens itself onto the Legendary Pokémon to absorb it! Our heroes manage to fight it off with the help of Solgaleo, but the creature attacks Solgaleo, absorbing it and escaping through an Ultra Wormhole.
1030	1023	46	"The Prism Between Light and Darkness!" (Prism of Light and Darkness, Its Name is Necrozma!!); Transliteration: "Hikari to yami no purizumu, sononaha nekurozuma!!" (Japanese: 光と闇のプリズム、その名はネクロズマ！！)	September 6, 2018	February 2, 2019
After Lunala recovers from UB Black's attack, it leads the Ultra Guardians through an Ultra Wormhole to rescue Solgaleo! On the other side, they discover Poipole's original home—an incredible world teeming with other Poipole, but everything is shrouded in darkness. They meet a formidable Pokémon named Naganadel, who explains that Poipole's world could be ruined without the light from Necrozma—the true identity of UB Black and The Blinding One. But Solgaleo is in danger, too! Ash has a solution: help them all! By sending their own Z-Power to Necrozma, will our heroes be able to save Solgaleo as well?
1031	1024	47	"Securing the Future!" (Connect to the Future! The Legend of the Radiant One!); Transliteration: "Mirai e tsunage! Kagayaki-sama no densetsu!!" (Japanese: 未来へつなげ！かがやきさまの伝説！！)	September 13, 2018	February 9, 2019
The Ultra Guardians, along with Faba and Professor Kukui, are attempting to return The Blinding One to its original form! As Necrozma in its "UB Black" form, it's holding Solgaleo captive and threatening Poipole's home world. Our heroes have been attempting to "feed" Necrozma with Z-Power to restore its light, but it's not enough. That's when the people of Alola band together to send their own power to Necrozma—and it works! The Blinding One is restored and Solgaleo is released. Poipole's world is renewed, too, and Poipole decides to stay behind to protect it. As a final goodbye present, it draws a loving portrait of Ash and Pikachu.
1032	1025	48	"A Plethora of Pikachu!" (It's a Pikachu Outbreak! The Pikachu Valley!!); Transliteration: "Tairyō hassei-chū! Pikachū nota ni!!" (Japanese: 大量発生チュウ！ピカチュウのたに！！)	October 7, 2018	February 16, 2019
Ash, Kiawe and Mimo discover an amazing place called Pikachu Valley, home to the biggest group of Pikachu they've ever seen! Their Trainer is a major pika-fan named Pikala, who gives everyone a set of Pikachu ears and a tail and insists that they all talk in Pikaspeak by adding "pika" to every sentence. At first, Ash's Pikachu seems to be a big hit with the ladies—but Pikala clarifies that they're just offering their usual pika-greetings. Annoyed by this behavior, the boss Pikachu challenges our buddy to a battle, but Ash's Pikachu wins—and then thwarts an attempt by Team Rocket to grab the whole group.
1033	1026	49	"Turning the Other Mask!" (Kukui's Desperate Situation! Another Royal Mask!!); Transliteration: "Kukui zettaizetsumei! Mōhitori no roiyarumasuku!!" (Japanese: ククイ絶体絶命！もう一人のロイヤルマスク！！)	October 14, 2018	February 23, 2019
Everyone is excited when Royal Mask announces a meet and greet at the mall! But things get complicated when Professor Burnet and Ash want to take Professor Kukui to the event… Kukui enlists Molayne's help to switch places and keep his secret. But James and Faba, who are both big fans, catch Molayne "stealing" the royal mask and tie him up. Unfortunately, a rival shows up for a revenge match, forcing Faba to don the mask and take to the ring! It all works out in the end—Molayne escapes and helps Kukui get his mask back, the rival is defeated, and Royal Mask's secret identity is safe.

== Music ==
The Japanese opening songs are "Alola!!" (アローラ!!, Arōra!!) by Satoshi / Ash Ketchum (Rica Matsumoto) with Pikachu (Ikue Otani), "Future Connection" (未来コネクション, Mirai Konekushon) by ЯeaL and "Your Adventure" (キミの冒険; Kimi no Bōken) by Taiiku Okazaki. The ending songs are "Pose" (ポ-ズ, Pōzu), "Twerp, Twerpette" (ジャリボーイ・ジャリガール, Jari-bōi, Jari-gāru) by Taiiku Okazaki and the Japanese ending theme song of Pokémon the Movie: The Power of Us, "Breath" (ブレス, Buresu) by Porno Graffitti to promote the movie. The English opening song is "Under the Alolan Moon" by composer Ed Goldfarb, featuring Haven Paschall and Ben Dixon. Its instrumental version serves as the ending theme.

== Home media releases ==
Viz Media and Warner Home Video released the entire series on a single 5-disc boxset on DVD and Blu-ray in the United States on May 21, 2019. This is the first and so far, only complete Pokémon series to be released on the Blu-ray format in the United States, as the Indigo League boxset is missing the third volume.
