= The 19th Medical Chart =

Japanese manga series

- First tankōbon volume cover, featuring Akira Tokushige

19番目のカルテ 徳重晃の問診 (19 Banme no Karute Tokushige Akira no monshin)
- Manga
- Written by: Fujiya Katsuhito
- Published by: Coamix
- English publisher: Emaqi
- Imprint: Zenon Comics
- Magazine: Zenon Editorial Department
- Original run: December 20, 2019 – present
- Volumes: 11
- Television drama
- Directed by: Takahiro Aoyama; Takayoshi Tanazawa; Masahide Izumi
- Produced by: Aina Iwasaki
- Written by: Fumi Tsubota
- Music by: Alisa Okehazama
- Studio: TBS Sparkle; TBS
- Original network: JNN (TBS)
- Original run: July 13, 2025 – September 7, 2025
- Episodes: 8
- icon

The 19th Medical Chart (19番目のカルテ 徳重晃の問診, 19 Banme no Karute Tokushige Akira no Monshin) is a Japanese medical manga series written and illustrated by Fujiya Katsuhito. It began serialization on Coamix's Zenon Editorial Department website via its Web Comic Zenyon section since December 20, 2019, with the series' individual chapters being collected in 11 tankōbon volumes as of June 2025. A drama adaptation aired on TBS and its affiliates as part of the Sunday Theatre timeslot from July 13 to September 7, 2025.

== Plot ==
Japan has a developed health-care system, divided into 18 specialized fields, including "brain surgery", "ophthalmology", and "orthopaedics", with each specialist examining and treating patients. A new 19th area has been added to these 18 fields, as the Department of General Medicine. Apart from treatments, the department also finds solutions for patients based on their mental health and lifestyle, working with those who don't know which department to visit, and with those whom even specialists have difficulty diagnosing. Tokushige is one of these practitioners: through medical interviews, he listens carefully and goes beyond their words to find what is ailing them. He brings his expertise to the newly established department at Outora General Hospital.

== Cast ==
Main cast Add. cast1 Add. cast2

Uotora General Hospital

- Akira Tokushige (played by Jun Matsumoto), a general practitioner who tries to find the best for his patients even if it takes time. He's a new doctor at Uotora General Hospital
- Mizuki Takino (played by Fuka Koshiba), a third year novice doctor, specialist in orthopedic surgery following a two-year internship at Uotora General Hospital. Although she has the desire to "sincerely face each and every patient", she is constantly reminded of the gap between her ideal and reality, leading to conflict every day
- Kojiro Togo (played by Mackenyu), a surgeon highly regarded within the hospital for his reliable skills and calm judgment; son of Rokurō Tōgō, head of surgery at Uotora General Hospital
- Shiori Arimatsu (played by Yoshino Kimura), veteran doctor of Uotora General Hospital, head of the pediatrics department
- Noboru Akaike (played by Min Tanaka), Tokushige's mentor. He worked hard to establish general medicine in Japan. He has worked at a large hospital and trained general practitioners, but now he works as an island doctor, caring for the residents' lives
- Keita Kayama (played by Hiroya Shimizu), a new intern, Takino's colleague. He believes "it's pointless to dwell on unanswerable questions". This often leads him to view Takino's earnest struggles between ideals and reality with a degree of bemusement.
- Tetsuo Osu (played by Taiiku Okazaki), an anesthesiologist who prioritizes a steady workload and an early finish above all else. He's not a fan of socializing. He's constantly bothered by Chayazaka from cardiovascular surgery, which he finds incredibly irritating.
- Akiko Toyohashi (played by Nobue Iketani), veteran nurse assigned to the newly established General Medicine Department as Tokushige's key assistant. She's known as the hospital's go-to person for information; it's said there's nothing she doesn't know. She seems to have known Tokushige for a long time.
- Hirate Shu (played by Chikara Honda), an ENT doctor known for his gentle nature and considerate approach. He's always mindful of keeping things smooth with the other doctors.
- Maiko Seto (played by Haruna Matsui), a relatively inexperienced junior nurse (only three years in) who is known for her cool head and efficiency, earning the trust of her colleagues.
- Kokoro Chayasaka (played by First Summer Uika), a cardiovascular surgeon renowned in the medical field. One of the most eccentric personalities at Uotora, often overwhelms those who catch his interest.
- Tatsuya Narumi (played by Kanji Tsuda), head of the orthopedic department. Takino's supervising doctor. His calm, stern demeanor, makes him seem unapproachable to his colleagues. A believer in efficient, streamlined medical practice, he questions the value of the general medicine department's patient-centric approach.
- Rokurō Tōgō (played by Narushi Ikeda), head of the surgery department, Togo is a rigid, fiscally conservative administrator. Despite being university friends with Director Kitano, they're constantly at odds, disagreeing on everything from hospital operations to small talk. He's openly skeptical of Kitano's new comprehensive medical department, questioning its necessity. He's Kojiro's father.
- Eikichi Kitano (played by Katsuhisa Namase), is a seemingly fumbling and unreliable director. He is the one who established the general medicine department at Uotora.

Patients

- Todo Kuroiwa (played by Riisa Naka) (episode 1)
- Junichi Yokobuki (played by Naomasa Musaka) (episode 1)

== Episodes ==
No.	Title	Directed by	Written by	Original release date	Viewers (millions)
1	This doctor is going to change people and medicine! Transliteration: "Sono ishi ga, hito o iryō o, kaete iku!" (Japanese: その医師が、人を医療を、変えていく!)	Takahiro Aoyama	Aya Tsubota	July 13, 2025	
General Hospital Uotora plays a central role in the region. However, patients like Todo Kuroiwa and Junichi Yokobuki, find themselves frustrated and dissatisfied with the doctors, as their main complaints go unheard, because they end up with very short examination times, or sent from one doctor to another, as the hospital has only specialized attention. Hospital director, Eikichi Kitano, has taken the decision to open a 19th field, the Department of General Medicine, and is waiting for the doctor who will be in charge of it. Meanwhile, a man (who turns out to be doctor Akira Tokushige) appears at the hospital's entrance and notices something is wrong with Yokobuki, who is hospitalized in the orthopedic department, by just observing him, and later saves him from a myocardial infarction, when Yokobuki suddenly suffers a "cough attack". After introducing himself to the staff, Tokushige finally diagnoses what is ailing Kuroiwa, giving her peace of mind and a name to her illness.
2	Both Hero and Monster; Transliteration: "Hīrō mo, kaijū mo," (Japanese: ヒーローも、怪獣も、)	Takahiro Aoyama	Aya Tsubota	July 27, 2025	
Tokushige's concern over a dying patient's brother generates tension among his colleagues
3	No Matter Which Path You Choose; Transliteration: "Dono michi o erande mo" (Japanese: どの道を選んでも)	Takayoshi Tanazawa	Aya Tsubota	August 3, 2025	
A TV announcer diagnosed with cancer refuses surgery, causing tension between Tokushige and Togo.
4	Living With Someone; Transliteration: "Dare ka to ikiru to iu koto" (Japanese: 誰かと生きるということ)	Masahide Izumi	Aya Tsubota	August 10, 2025	
A diabetic patient's wife blames the doctors because he doesn't show any progress. The case reassignment causes tension between the couple and among the doctors.
5	Where's the Soul? Transliteration: "Kokoro wa doko ni aru" (Japanese: 心はどこにある)	Takayoshi Tanazawa	Aya Tsubota	August 17, 2025	
When a brilliant but enigmatic heart surgeon's mother is rushed to the hospital in critical condition becomes, her composed facade unravels.
6	Journey to the End; Transliteration: "Saigo e no tabiji" (Japanese: 最期への旅路)	Takahiro Aoyama	Aya Tsubota	August 24, 2025	
Mizuki Takino struggles to find her role when a terminal lung cancer patient's wish to die with dignity and his family conflicts, as she takes responsibility of providing home care for the patient.
7	I'm not going to tell you. Transliteration: "Omaeni wa, hanasanai" (Japanese: お前には、話さない)	Masahide Izumi	Fumi Tsubota	August 31, 2025	
Uneasy truths are unearthed when Tokushige visits his old mentor on a remote island. At the hospital, tensions and challenges grow as the next director is selected.
8	Someone Who Treats People; Transliteration: "Hito o, miru hito" (Japanese: ひとを、診る人)	Takahiro Aoyama	Fumi Tsubota	September 7, 2025	
Tokushige's mentor suffers a sudden collapse, and his refusal of further treatment and a vow of silence, forces Tokushige to confront questions of life, death, and what it means to truly heal.

== Music ==
Aimyon will be in charge of "Ichi ni tsuite", the drama's theme song.
