= Real (band) =

Japanese rock band

- Origin: Osaka Prefecture
- Genre: Rock
- Years active: 2012–present
- Labels: Crazy (2014, 2021–present); SME (2015–2020)
- Members: Ryoko
- Past members: Yurika; Yuri; Fumiha; Aika
- Website: real-girlsband.com

Real (stylized as ЯeaL) is a Japanese all-female rock band formed in Osaka Prefecture in 2012. The original lineup of Ryoko, Yurika, Fumiha, and Aika was solidified when they were in junior high school. The band made their major label debut in 2016 with the release of the single "Byōsoku Emotion" (秒速エモーション) on SME Records. Their song "Kagerō" (カゲロウ) was used as an opening theme of the anime television series Gin Tama. Guitarist Yurika left the band following the tour for their first album 19 in 2017. The group's music has also been featured in Pokémon The Series: Sun & Moon and Boruto: Naruto Next Generations. Real became an independent band again in 2021, and Yuri officially joined as guitarist the following year.

== History ==
Members Ryoko and Yurika met while in junior high school. Yurika had originally considered pursuing a career as a voice actor, but instead decided to take up music. Ryoko joined a school music contest alone and placed as a finalist, and decided to team up with Yurika to increase their chances of winning, although they would ultimately end up losing. Nevertheless, the two decided to continue on collaborating and form a band. They would be joined by two further members: Fumiha, who the two had known from online exchanges, and Fumiha's schoolmate Aika. The name "ЯeaL" was chosen because of a desire to use a "cool" English word. At the time, Yurika settled on the word "Real" but found it to be uninteresting, but after discovering the Cyrillic letter Я, she decided to incorporate that in the band's name. She found the letter appropriate, as it would represent the showing of the "real inside and outside" of the band, while also reflecting the letter's use as a Russian word for "I".

The band began performing at various live houses in Osaka, but initially did not gain much popularity, almost leading to their dissolution. Eventually, the band's popularity began to increase, and they ended up competing in the Eo Music Try contest in 2013, where they placed as a finalist. During this time they also released their first self-produced CD. In 2014 the band released the mini-album Change Your Real. In 2015, the band performed at Summer Sonic, a large music festival in Osaka, where they received two awards and praise from judges.

The band made its major debut under SME Records in 2016, releasing their first major single "Byōsoku Emotion" (秒速エモーション, Per-second Emotion) on March 9 of that year. Their second major single "Kamen Mīhā Joshi" (仮面ミーハー女子) was released on August 3, 2016; the title song was used as an opening theme in the TBS television program Rank Ōkoku. Their third single "Kagerō" (カゲロウ, Mayfly) was released on March 1, 2017; the title song is used as an opening theme in the anime television series Gin Tama. They released their first album 19. on May 10, 2017. Following the album's release, Yurika announced that she would be leaving the band following the end of their album promotional tour, leaving Ryoko, Fumiha, and Aika as remaining members.

The band's fourth single "Mirai Connection" (未来コネクション, Future Connection) was released on May 2, 2018; the title song is used as an opening theme in the anime series Pokémon the Series: Sun & Moon – Ultra Adventures. The band also made voice cameos in an episode of the series. Their fifth single "Tsuyogari Loser" (強がりLOSER) was released on February 20, 2019; the title song is used as an opening theme in the anime series Boruto: Naruto Next Generations. Their second major album Light Up Ambivalents (ライトアップアンビバレンツ) was released on September 16, 2020.

Real became an independent band again when their contract with SME ended at the end of 2020. Support guitarist Yuri officially joined the band in 2022.

In 2025, Aika and Fumiha, who had taken on the roles of bassist and drummer, officially left the band.

== Members ==
=== Current members ===
- Ryoko (born December 12, 1997) – Guitar, lead vocalist. She is also active as a solo singer under the stage name Namu (名無).

=== Former members ===
- Yurika (born August 12, 1997) – Guitar, chorus (2012–2017)
- Yuri (born September 25, 1995) - Guitar, chorus (2022–2023)
- Fumiha (born August 30, 1997) – Bass, chorus
- Aika (born February 11, 1998) – Drums, chorus

== Discography ==
=== Singles ===
Title	Peak Oricon position
"Byōsoku Emotion" (秒速エモーション, Per-second Emotion): Release date: March 9, 2016	83
"Kamen Mīhā Joshi" (仮面ミーハー女子): Release date: August 3, 2016	141
"Kagerō" (カゲロウ, Mayfly): Release date: March 1, 2017	19
"Mirai Connection" (未来コネクション, Future Connection): Release date: May 2, 2018	35
"Tsuyogari Loser" (強がりLOSER): Release date: February 20, 2019	63
"Unchain My Heart": Release date: September 25, 2019	
"Genjō Destruction" (現状ディストラクション) (Spyair Cover): Release date: October 2, 2019	
"Brilliant escape": Release date: March 1, 2021	
"Kamisama" (カミサマ, The God): Release date: July 1, 2022	
"Bright": Release date: August 5, 2022	
"Sayonara no Riyuu" (さよならの理由): Release date: September 9, 2022	
"Destruction Girl" (ディストラクション・ガール): Release date: October 7, 2022	
"re:call": Release date: November 4, 2022	
"Haikei, Anohinobokue" (拝啓、あの日の僕へ): Release date: December 9, 2022	

=== Albums ===
Title	Peak Oricon position
19.: Release date: May 10, 2017	49
Light Up Ambivalents (ライトアップアンビバレンツ): Release date: September 16, 2020	35

=== Mini-albums ===
Title	Peak Oricon position
Change Your Real: Release date: December 3, 2014	227
Our New ЯeaL: Release date: April 8, 2023	
