= TBS Sparkle =

Japanese TV and media production company

TBS Sparkle, Inc.

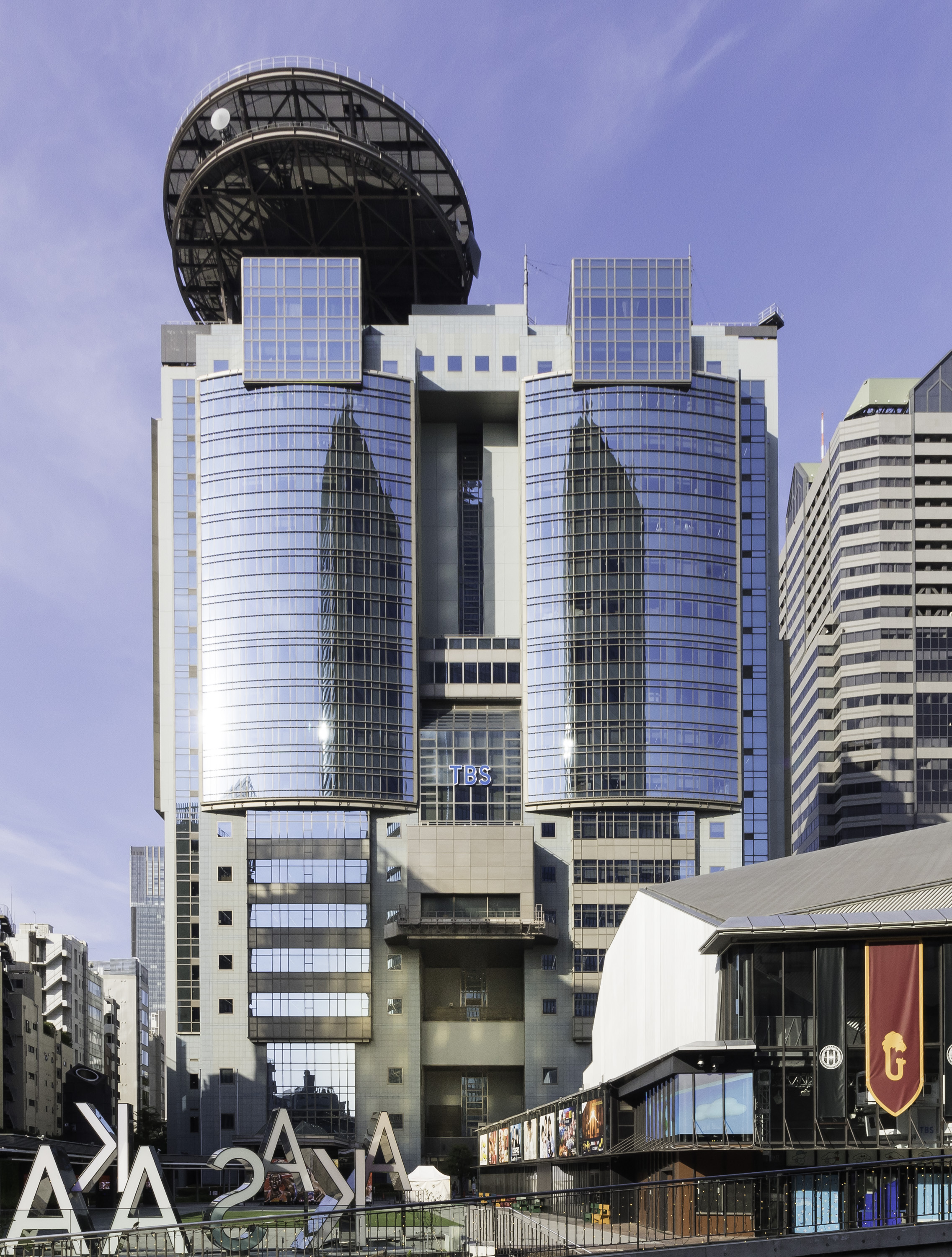
- Headquarters in Minato, Tokyo
- Native name: 株式会社TBSスパークル
- Romanized name: Kabushiki-gaisha TBS supākuru
- Formerly: TBS Content Products, Inc. (2018)
- Company type: Subsidiary
- Industry: Media
- Predecessor: TBS Vision
- Founded: June 29, 2018; 7 years ago
- Headquarters: Akasaka, Minato, Tokyo, Japan
- Owner: TBS Holdings
- Website: tbssparkle.co.jp/en/

TBS Sparkle, Inc. (Stylized as all caps), is a Japanese media production company and a subsidiary of TBS Television. Recently, the company produced shows such as Takeshi's Castle (2023 edition), Extremely Inappropriate!, Let's Get Divorced, Why Didn't I Tell You a Million Times? and Light of My Lion, as well as feature films Last Mile, Faceless and Grand Maison Paris. It won a Silver at the 2024 ContentAsia Awards for Worst to First: A Teen Baseball Miracle, and Last Mile and Faceless took home a total of four Japan Academy Film Prizes in 2025.

== History ==
TBS Sparkle has its roots in Tokyo Terebi Eiga (Tokyo TV Film Company), founded in 1955. The company changed names several times through the course of its history, and in 2018, it and 10 other TBS subsidiaries merged to become TBS Sparkle.

== Recent works ==
=== Television dramas ===
References:

- Hell for You
- Ms. Saionji doesn't do Housework
- 9Border
- Extremely Inappropriate!
- Worst to First: A Teen Baseball Miracle
- Trillion Game (TV drama adaptation)
- Let's Get Divorced
- Dearest (Japanese TV drama)
- MIU404
- Light of My Lion
- 3-B Class Kinpachi Jr.
- Murai in Love
- Then You Try Making It!

=== Films ===
- Faceless
- Grand Maison Paris
- Last Mile
- My Home Hero the Movie
- As Long as We Both Shall Live (Japanese film)
- The Forbidden Play
- Fragments of the Last Will
- We Made a Beautiful Bouquet
- Homestay (Amazon movie)

=== Documentaries / Other Programs ===
- Isamu Noguchi's Unfinished A-Bomb Cenotaph
- A Long Search for a Little Girl - An Old Report Card Unveils an Untold History
- Takeshi's Castle (2023 edition)
- The World Heritage
- A Monk Who Wears Heels
- Getting to Know Beautiful Japan
- Tokyo Nostalgic Ramen
- Prime Japan

=== Anime ===
- The Quintessential Quintuplets Movie
- Adachi and Shimamura
- My Teen Romantic Comedy SNAFU Climax
- K-ON!
- How to Keep a Mummy
- The Iceblade Sorcerer Shall Rule the World
- The Demon Girl Next Door2
- The Dawn of the Witch
