= Murai in Love =

Japanese manga series

- First tankōbon volume cover, featuring Ayano Tanaka (front) and Murai (back)

村井の恋 (Murai no Koi)
- Genre: Romantic comedy
- Manga
- Written by: Junta Shima
- Published by: Line Digital Frontier (digital); Media Factory (print)
- Imprint: Gene Line Comics
- Magazine: Line Manga
- Original run: June 18, 2018 – June 13, 2022
- Volumes: 7
- Television drama
- Directed by: Taichi Imura; Aya Matsuki; Daisuke Yamamoto
- Produced by: Keiko Matsumoto; Hiromi Matsushita
- Written by: Kōhei Kiyasu
- Studio: TBS Sparkle
- Licensed by: Rakuten Viki
- Original network: TBS
- Original run: April 6, 2022 – May 25, 2022
- Episodes: 8
- Manga

Murai no Koi Gaiden: Great Twin Busters
- Written by: Junta Shima
- Published by: Line Digital Frontier (digital); Media Factory (print)
- Imprint: Gene Line Comics
- Magazine: Line Manga
- Original run: October 23, 2023 – present
- Volumes: 1
- Anime television series
- Directed by: Yoshinobu Yamakawa
- Written by: Susumu Yamakawa
- Music by: Ruka Kawada
- Studio: J.C.Staff
- Licensed by: Disney Platform Distribution
- Original network: Tokyo MX, BS NTV, BBC, AT-X
- Original run: October 6, 2024 (Note: Episodes were released on Disney+ and Hulu one month before their televised airings from September 4 to November 20, 2024.) – December 22, 2024
- Episodes: 12
- icon

Murai in Love (Japanese: 村井の恋, Hepburn: Murai no Koi) is a Japanese manga series written and illustrated by Junta Shima. It was serialized in Line Digital Frontier's Line Manga service from June 2018 to June 2022, with its chapters collected into seven tankōbon volumes. A television drama adaptation aired from April to May 2022. An anime television series adaptation produced by J.C.Staff aired from October to December 2024.

== Plot ==
Murai is a top student in his grade at his high school who is in love with his homeroom teacher, Ayano Tanaka. However, Ms. Tanaka has no interest in him and is secretly an otaku obsessed with Hitotose, her favorite character from the otome game Feudal Era Love Scroll. After Ms. Tanaka rejects him, stating that she has no interest in men with long, black hair, he appears at school the next day with short, blond hair, becoming the spitting image of Hitotose.

== Characters ==
Murai (村井)
Voiced by: Kengo Takanashi, Yuka Nukui^{Ep. 11 credits} (young) (Japanese); Brandon Jay, Daisy Guevara (young) (English)
Portrayed by: Ryubi Miyase
Murai is the top student in his grade at his high school. He is in love with Ms. Tanaka and tries to pursue her at all costs. He is in the school's A class.
Ayano Tanaka (田中 彩乃, Tanaka Ayano)
Voiced by: Yoko Hikasa (Japanese); Morgan Lauré (English)
Portrayed by: Hikaru Takahashi
Ms. Tanaka is Murai's homeroom teacher and is nicknamed "Steel Maiden" (鉄子, Tetsuko) because of her "steel heart". Secretly, she is an otaku and is obsessed with Hitotose, her favorite character from the game Feudal Era Love Scroll.
Hitotose (春夏秋冬)
Voiced by: Yuichi Nakamura (drama CD), Yuki Kaji (TV drama), Nobunaga Shimazaki (anime) (Japanese); Michael Sinterniklaas (English)
Portrayed by: Ryubi Miyase
Hitotose is Ms. Tanaka's favorite character from the otome game Feudal Era Love Scroll.
Kiriyama (桐山)
Voiced by: Hiroyuki Yoshino (drama CD), Kōhei Amasaki (anime) (Japanese); John Patneaude (English)
Portrayed by: Asahi Ito
Kiriyama is Murai's friend who is in the school's art program. He is commonly referred to as "Kiri" (桐).
Hirai (平井)
Voiced by: Daisuke Namikawa (drama CD), Haruki Ishiya (anime) (Japanese); Matt Shipman (English)
Portrayed by: Ryōsuke Sota
Hirai is Murai's friend who is a womanizer. He is in the school's B class.
Yamakado (山門)
Voiced by: Masaya Matsukaze (Japanese); Crispin Freeman (English)
Portrayed by: Kōdai Asaka
Mr. Yamakado is Ms. Tanaka's co-worker. He is known as the "teacher from hell" and has been previously divorced.
Yuuka Nishifuji (西藤 悠加, Nishifuji Yūka)
Voiced by: Saori Gotō (Japanese); Diana Garnet (English)
Portrayed by: Noa Tsurushima
Yuuka is one of Murai's childhood friends along with her twin sister Hitomi. She is a doujinshi artist under the pseudonym "Yu-katan" (ゆうかたん, Yū-katan), who also coincidentally happens to be Ms. Tanaka's favorite fan artist. She is in the school's art program.
Hitomi Nishifuji (西藤 仁美, Nishifuji Hitomi)
Voiced by: Mikoi Sasaki (Japanese); Felecia Angelle (English)
Portrayed by: Riko
Hitomi is one of Murai's childhood friends along with her twin sister Yuuka. She is a cosplayer. She is in the school's B class.
Yayoi Fukunaga (福永 弥生, Fukunaga Yayoi)
Voiced by: Yuuki Hirose (Japanese); Laura Stahl (English)
Portrayed by: Nanoka Hara
Yayoi is Murai's childhood friend who has been in love with him for 10 years. She learned self-defense after she was nearly kidnapped as a child and tries to keep a docile demeanor around Murai.

== Media ==
=== Manga ===
Written and illustrated by Junta Shima, Murai in Love was serialized under the Gene Line label of Line Digital Frontier's Line Manga service from June 18, 2018, to June 13, 2022. Media Factory has compiled the chapters into individual tankōbon volumes. Seven volumes were published from December 2018 to June 2022. A drama CD adaptation was included in an issue of Monthly Comic Gene published on November 15, 2019.

A spin-off manga, titled Murai no Koi Gaiden: Great Twin Busters (村井の恋外伝 グレートツインバスターズ), began serialization on Line Manga on October 23, 2023. The first tankōbon volume was released on September 13, 2024.

==== Volumes ====
===== Murai in Love =====
No.	Japanese release date	Japanese ISBN
1	December 15, 2018	978-4-04-065333-4
2	May 15, 2019	978-4-04-065700-4
3	November 15, 2019	978-4-04-064149-2
4	August 12, 2020	978-4-04-064621-3
5	March 15, 2021	978-4-04-680108-1
6	October 15, 2021	978-4-04-680630-7
7	June 15, 2022	978-4-04-681382-4

===== Murai no Koi Gaiden: Great Twin Busters =====
No.	Japanese release date	Japanese ISBN
1	September 13, 2024	978-4-04-683951-0

=== Drama ===
A television drama adaptation was announced in March 2022, starring Hikaru Takahashi. It was directed by Taichi Imura, Aya Matsuki, and Daisuke Yamamoto, based on a screenplay by Kōhei Kiyasu. Keiko Matsumoto and Hiromi Matsushita of TBS Sparkle served as the producers. The series aired from April 6 to May 25, 2022, on TBS's brand new Drama Stream programming block. The opening theme song is "Peace" (ピース, Pīsu) by Finlands, while the ending theme song is "Niji o Yobu" (虹を呼ぶ) by Reaction the Buttha. The series began streaming on Rakuten Viki on April 21, 2023.

==== Episodes ====
No.	Title	Directed by (Note: Production staff information is taken from the ending credits of each episode.)	Original release date
1	"My Student Has Made a Big Transformation into My Bias"; Transliteration: "Seito ga Oshi ni Dai Henshin" (Japanese: 生徒が推しに大☆変☆身)	Taichi Imura	April 6, 2022
2	"A Coincidental Love Story"; Transliteration: "Rabu Sutōrī wa Hitsuzen ni" (Japanese: ラブストーリーは必然に)	Taichi Imura	April 13, 2022
3	"Happy Summer of Love"; Transliteration: "Koi no Happī Samā" (Japanese: 恋のハッピーサマー)	Aya Matsuki	April 20, 2022
4	"I Want To Eat Your Cheeks"; Transliteration: "Kimi no Hoppeta o Tabetai" (Japanese: 君のほっぺたをたべたい)	Aya Matsuki	April 27, 2022
5	"The Curtain Opens for the Tumultuous Culture Festival"; Transliteration: "Haran no Bunkasai Kaimaku" (Japanese: 波乱の文化祭☆開幕)	Daisuke Yamamoto	May 4, 2022
6	"Distance of Love"; Transliteration: "Koi no Disutansu" (Japanese: 恋のディスタンス)	Aya Matsuki	May 11, 2022
7	"Camping in Mid-winter"; Transliteration: "Mafuyu no Gachikyanpu" (Japanese: 真冬のガチキャンプ)	Taichi Imura	May 18, 2022
8	"Destined Love"; Transliteration: "Unmei no Koi" (Japanese: 運命の恋)	Taichi Imura	May 25, 2022

=== Anime ===
An anime adaptation was announced in June 2022. It was produced by J.C.Staff and directed by Yoshinobu Yamakawa, with scripts supervised and written by Susumu Yamakawa, and music composed by Ruka Kawada. While the series streamed worldwide on Disney+ and on Hulu in the United States from September 4 to November 20, 2024, it aired from October 6 to December 22, 2024, on Tokyo MX and other networks. The opening theme song is "Henshin!" (へんしん!) performed by Rinu, while the ending theme song is "Suko" (すこ。) performed by Yabai T-Shirt Ya-san.

An English dub premiered on March 10, 2025.

==== Episodes ====
No.	Title	Directed by	Storyboarded by	Original release date
1	"Episode 1"	Yoshie Kita	Yoshinobu Yamakawa	October 6, 2024
2	"Episode 2"	Yoshie Kita	Yoshinobu Yamakawa	October 13, 2024
3	"Episode 3"	Yoshie Kita	Yoshinobu Yamakawa	October 20, 2024
4	"Episode 4"	Yoshie Kita	Yoshinobu Yamakawa	October 27, 2024
5	"Episode 5"	Yoshie Kita	Yoshinobu Yamakawa	November 3, 2024
6	"Episode 6"	Yoshie Kita	Yoshinobu Yamakawa	November 10, 2024
7	"Episode 7"	Yoshie Kita	Kiyotaka Ōhata	November 17, 2024
8	"Episode 8"	Yoshie Kita	Yoshinobu Yamakawa	November 24, 2024
9	"Episode 9"	Yoshie Kita	Yoshinobu Yamakawa	December 1, 2024
10	"Episode 10"	Yoshie Kita	Yoshinobu Yamakawa	December 8, 2024
11	"Episode 11"	Yoshie Kita	Yoshinobu Yamakawa	December 15, 2024
12	"Episode 12"	Yoshinobu Yamakawa; Yoshie Kita	Yoshinobu Yamakawa	December 22, 2024

== Reception ==
In 2019, the series ranked second in the Next Manga Awards in the web manga category.

The series' first episode received mixed reviews from Anime News Network's staff during the Fall 2024 season previews. Richard Eisenbeis was critical of the "motion comic" quality animation but praised Yoko Hikasa's performance as Ms. Tanaka, concluding that: "All in all, this isn't ever going to be considered a masterpiece. It looks far too rough for it to ever get any mainstream appeal. However, as a comedy, it did its job. I laughed a lot and will continue watching as long as I continue to do so." Caitlin Moore criticized the "limited animation" for removing the series' comedy potential and felt that Ms. Tanaka's mishaps were "not relatable enough to feel like it's funny because it's true." Rebecca Silverman was also critical of the "choppy and cheap-feeling" presentation and "downright ugly" animation, and was turned off by the "obnoxious characters and storyline". James Beckett found the episode "earnestly pathetic" with its "memorably terrible visuals" and Hikasa's "genuinely charming and energetic performance". Fellow ANN editor Jeremy Tauber reviewed the complete anime series and gave it an overall B grade. While critiquing that the first three episodes felt awkward in places, the humor and direction did not consistently deliver and the "unorthodox nature" will put off regular rom-com viewers, he praised the crude animation and direction for giving the story an "oddball charm", some "slower tender moments" breathing believability into the main couple's chemistry, and the "well-composed" soundtrack, concluding that: "For better or worse, you won't find an anime this season that looks and feels this unique. I'd like to think it's for the better."
