= Pokémon Evolutions =

Japanese original net animation (ONA) series

- Original net animation
- Directed by: Daiki Tomiyasu
- Produced by: Andy Gose; Taito Okiura
- Written by: Benjamin Townsend
- Studio: OLM Team Kato
- Released: September 9, 2021 – December 23, 2021
- Runtime: 6–10 minutes
- Episodes: 8

Pokémon Evolutions (ポケモンエボリューションズ, Pokémon Eboryūshonzu) is a 2021 Japanese animated original net animation (ONA) series released on YouTube and Pokémon TV by The Pokémon Company.

Pokémon Evolutions is a series of 8 episodes released in celebration of the 25th anniversary of Pokémon and is inspired by all 8 regions of the Pokémon world. The series was first announced on September 2, 2021. Each episode is dedicated to each core series region in reverse order by introduction. The first episode was released on September 9, 2021, with subsequent episodes released on a weekly or bi-weekly basis.

== Episode list ==
No.	Title	Original release date	Ref.
1	"The Champion" "The Champion" (ザ・チャンピオン)	September 9, 2021	
In the moments before his championship match, Galar's Champion Leon reflects on his defeat at the hands of Eternatus during the Darkest Day, and prepares for his upcoming match against the very challenger he endorsed (the male player character of Pokémon Sword and Shield).
2	"The Eclipse" "The Eclipse" (ジ・エクリプス)	September 23, 2021	
After Lusamine uses Nebby's power to travel into the Ultra Wormhole to capture Necrozma, Lillie, alongside a dear friend (the female player character of Pokémon Ultra Sun and Ultra Moon), use the Sun and Moon Flutes to awaken the Altar of the Moone and evolve Nebby into Lunala in order to pursue her. However, Lusamine and Guzma emerge from an Ultra Wormhole as Necrozma appears, attacking and subduing Lunala before fusing itself with it to become its Dawn Wings form. Lillie stands alongside her friend as the latter prepares for battle.
3	"The Visionary" "The Visionary" (ザ・ビジョナリー)	October 7, 2021	
After activating the Ultimate Weapon underneath Geosenge Town, Lysandre battles with his Mega Gyarados against a Trainer (the male player character of Pokémon X and Y) and Xerneas, but is defeated. After reflecting on his ideals of preserving the world's beauty, Lysandre fires the ultimate weapon in a final attempt to realize his flawed goals.
4	"The Plan" "The Plan" (ザ・プラン)	October 21, 2021	
Shortly after N's Castle rises over the Pokémon League, Ghetsis reflects on his plan up to this point. He recalls several key events, from meeting a young N and making him the king of Team Plasma to conveying his message of liberation to the citizens of Unova. Following N's victory against Alder, the one Trainer capable of stopping him (the female player character of Pokémon Black and White) arrives at the entrance to N's throne room where Ghetsis instructs her to go inside and battle N for the title of Unova's hero.
5	"The Rival" "The Rival" (ザ・ライバル)	December 2, 2021	
As Barry enters the Battle Tower and challenges the Tower Tycoon, whose identity is largely obscured, he reflects on his journey to become strong enough to challenge his father. Events include when he and his rival (the male player character of Pokémon Diamond and Pearl) obtained their starter Pokémon, to his defeat at the hands of Team Galactic Commander Jupiter, and his subsequent triumph over Jupiter alongside Lucas at the top of Spear Pillar. Upon Barry's victory over the Tower Tycoon, the Tycoon's identity is revealed to be Palmer, Barry's father, who proceeds to congratulate his son.
6	"The Wish" "The Wish" (ザ・ウィッシュ)	December 9, 2021	
After May arrives at the Sky Pillar on the back of Latios, Zinnia welcomes her, appreciating her for coming to the Sky Pillar, and proceeds to tell the story of Primal Kyogre and Primal Groudon, and the origins of Mega Evolution, as well as her people. The two later go to the top of the Sky Pillar, where Zinnia successfully summons Rayquaza. However, despite her pleas for the Legendary Pokemon to Mega Evolve, it cannot do so, due to the fact that the Meteoroids in Rayquaza's body have lost power over the years. Because of this, Zinnia despairs, due to all her efforts of Mega Evolving Rayquaza having failed. Suddenly, May's Meteoroid begins to glow, and at Rayquaza's urging, throws it at the Legendary Pokemon, swallowing it, and regaining the ability to Mega Evolve. May later challenges Rayquaza to a battle, and weakens it enough for it to be caught. Zinnia enters a flashback state, reflecting on her childhood dream of one day meeting Rayquaza. She later urges May to catch it, and succeeds in doing so. As her final duty as the last Lorekeeper of the Draconids, Zinnia, with her Mega Salamence, challenges May, who now has Mega Rayquaza on her side, in order to teach her how to use its full power.
7	"The Show" "The Show" (ザ・ショウ)	December 16, 2021	
The Kimono Girls perform a stage play at the Ecruteak City Dance Theater, where they each take turns narrating a part of the story of Ho-Oh, Lugia, and the destruction of the Brass Tower that led to Lugia fleeing to the ocean depths. The girls' respective Pokémon assist in visual effects.
8	"The Discovery" "The Discovery" (ザ・ディスカバリー)	December 23, 2021	
Green searches for the 150th Pokémon in order to complete her Pokédex, and notices Trace entering Cerulean Cave with the same goal. Upon confronting Trace, she declares that she will compete to catch the Pokémon first. She later discovers that Elaine has already beaten them both to capturing it, which is revealed to be Mewtwo, prompting Green to challenge Elaine in order to see Mewtwo in battle, but is defeated. Green returns to Professor Oak's lab and apologizes for being unable to complete the Pokédex, before she is reassured by Oak that she was part of a collective effort together with Trace and Elaine toward its completion. Oak is informed of the discovery of Steel-type Pokémon, and he declares that the Pokédex is not complete yet.

== Characters and voice cast ==
Character	English	Japanese
Alder	Andrew Eales	Yasuhiro Mamiya
Announcer (Galar)	Kevin M. Connolly	Takumu Miyazono
Anthea	Brittany Lauda	Yukiko Motoyoshi
Barry	Connor Ludovice	Ayumu Murase
Concordia	Dani Artaud	Miyari Nemoto
Corviknight/Pokémon voices	Shogo Sakata	Shogo Sakata
Diantha	Amber Lee Connors	Kotono Mitsuishi
Elaine (Player)	Brittany Lauda	Mariko Nagai
Ghetsis	Armen Taylor	Takehito Koyasu
Green	Cristina Vee	Suzuko Mimori
Hop	Adriel Varlack	Miyu Irino
Jupiter	Suzie Yeung	Saki Fujita
Kuni	Laura Post	Sumire Morohoshi
Leon	Aleks Le	Daisuke Ono
Lillie	Ama Lee	Ai Kayano
Lusamine	Dawn M. Bennett	Mie Sonozaki
Lysandre	Adin Rudd	Takaya Hashi
Malva	Marissa Lenti	Atsumi Tanezaki
May		Hina Natsume
Miki	Jenny Yokobori	Rie Murakawa
N	Chris Hackney	Yoshitsugu Matsuoka
N (young)	Brittany Lauda	Chiyuki Miura
Naoko	Xanthe Huynh	Akane Fujita
Palmer	Kaiji Tang	Masakazu Morita
Pikachu (Female)	Arisa Kori	Arisa Kori
Pikachu (Male)	Miyari Nemoto	Miyari Nemoto
Professor Oak	Keith Silverstein	Keiichi Sonobe
Professor Sycamore	Austin Lee Matthews	
Roark		Kohsuke Tanabe
Rookidee/Pokémon voices	Hina Natsume	Hina Natsume
Sayo	Jackie Lastra	Sayaka Senbongi
Stagehand (Ecruteak Theater)	Aleks Le	Shogo Sakata
Trace	Brandon Winckler	Soma Saito
Victor	Aleks Le	Kohsuke Tanabe
Zinnia	Laura Stahl	Ayane Sakura
Zuki	Heather Gonzalez	Reina Ueda
