= Light of My Lion =

2024 Japanese drama series

- Japanese: ライオンの隠れ家
- Literally: Lion's Den
- Genre: drama
- Screenplay by: Koji Tokuo; Yoshino Ichinohe
- Directed by: Toshio Tsuboi; Takahiro Aoyama; Izumi Masahide
- Starring: Yuya Yagira; Ryôta Bandô; Tasuku Sato; Asuka Saitō
- Music by: Sayaka Aoki
- Ending theme: "Fujin (風神)" by Vaundy
- Country of origin: Japan
- Original language: Japanese
- No. of seasons: 1
- No. of episodes: 11

Production
- Running time: circa 60 mins
- Production company: TBS Sparkle

Original release
- Network: TBS

Light of My Lion (Japanese: ライオンの隠れ家, Hepburn: Raion no Kakurega) is a Japanese drama television series written by Koji Tokuo and Yoshino Ichinohe, starring Yuya Yagira and Ryota Bando. Two brothers, after losing their parents in an accident, live a quiet life together. The appearance of a mysterious little boy interrupts their predictable life. The series started airing in October 2024.

== Premise ==
Hiroto Komori, a young man, works at the city hall in Urao City, Ibaraki Prefecture. After their parents died in an accident, Hiroto has been living with and caring for his younger autistic brother, Michito. Every day, they have the same routine: Hiroto drops his brother off at an art studio, going to work, and then afterwards goes home with his brother.

One day, a young boy named "Lion" appears in front of their house. Hiroto tries to take care of Lion for a night, but worries that it will disrupt their routine, and tries to find Lion's family.

== Episodes ==
No. overall	No. in season	Title	Directed by	Written by	Original release date
1	1	"EP.1: Meeting Lion" "「ライオン」との出会い"	Toshio Tsuboi	Koji Tokuo; Yoshino Ichinohe	11 October 2024
Hiroto and Michito discover a little boy, Lion, in front of their house. Michito, who is autistic, is greatly upset by the sudden disturbances in his regular routines. Hiroto tries finding out who Lion's parents are so he can return the boy. Based on some similarities between Lion and Aoi—Hiroto and Michito's estranged sister who left when she was 16 to "live freely"—Hiroto suspects Lion may be Aoi's son. Both Hiroto and Michito noticed that Lion has a large bruise and suspect he may have been abused; Michito questions whether Lion's home life (his "pride") is safe. Hiroto decides against bringing Lion to the police station. Shougo Tachibana reports the disappearance of his wife—Aoi Tachibana—and their son.
2	2	"EP. 2: Are you involved in a murder?!" "事件に巻き込まれてる!?"	Toshio Tsuboi	Koji Tokuo; Yoshino Ichinohe	18 October 2024
Hiroto is certain that Aoi is Lion's mother, and messages the contact in Lion's phone to set up a meet-up, believing it to be Aoi. He leaves Lion in the care of Michito, but has to leave before getting to the meet-up spot because Michito had a meltdown. The phone contact is not Aoi, but an unknown man ("X") who is keeping close tabs on Lion. The police discover clothes covered with Aoi's blood in the river.
3	3	"EP.3: We GO to the Zoo! Also, Who are his parents?" "動物園へGO!この子の親は?"	Takahiro Aoyama	Koji Tokuo; Yoshino Ichinohe	25 October 2024
The Trio goes to the zoo to see the lions, Michito needs to paint in public and Hiroto believes he may have discovered who Lion's family actually is.
4	4	"EP.4: Birthdays are happy days" "誕生日は幸せな日"	Takahiro Aoyama	Koji Tokuo; Yoshino Ichinohe	1 November 2024
Lion gets sick, prompting Hiroto to realize how little he knows about the child. Later, the brothers discover the birthday of Lion and decide to throw a birthday party for him.
5	5	"EP. 5: I'm Going to See My Mother~" "母親に会いに行くーー"	Izumi Masahide	Koji Tokuo; Yoshino Ichinohe	8 November 2024
A tabloid releases an article with the shocking claim that Aoi is still alive. The mysterious man ("X") tells Aoi that her cover has been blown and helps her evade the police.
6	6	"EP. 6: The decision of My Sister and the truth" "姉の決意と真実"	Toshio Tsuboi	Koji Tokuo; Yoshino Ichinohe	15 November 2024
Hiroto reads a news article about Aoi and wonders why she would tell such a blatant lie. Later, he learns more details about Lion's family.
7	7	"EP. 7: The trip to protect Lion" "ライオンを守るための旅行"	Takahiro Aoyama	Koji Tokuo; Yoshino Ichinohe	22 November 2024
In the hopes of keeping Lion's whereabouts a secret, Hiroto takes him to an island with Michito. Meanwhile, Shougo visits the Komori brothers' house.
8	8	"EP. 8: The Sister's commitment...and a time to say goodbye" "姉の覚悟…そして別れのとき"	Izumi Masahide	Koji Tokuo; Yoshino Ichinohe	29 November 2024
With Yurugi's help, Aoi heads to Sado to reunite with her family. Later, she explains her actions and Hiroto expresses his pent-up frustrations.
9	9	"EP. 9: I want to save Lion!" "ライオンを助けたい!"	Toshio Tsuboi	Koji Tokuo; Yoshino Ichinohe	6 December 2024
Hiroto and Michito hurry to the Tachibana house to rescue Aoi and Lion but find no one there. Meanwhile, Aoi and Shougo come to an agreement.
10	10	"EP. 10: The biggest storm and Falling out of love" "最大の嵐…愛の掛け違い"	Izumi Masahide	Koji Tokuo; Yoshino Ichinohe	13 December 2024
Inspired by Michito's decision to participate in an overnight trial at a new artists' group home, Hiroto takes action to rescue Aoi and Lion.
11	11	"FINALE: Our New Beginning" "僕たちの新しい始まり"	Toshio Tsuboi	Koji Tokuo; Yoshino Ichinohe	20 December 2024
Michito worries that Hiroto has left home because of him. Meanwhile, Hiroto wanders aimlessly through Tokyo and recalls childhood memories.

== Cast ==
- Yuya Yagira as Hiroto Komori, eldest brother of the family. He splits his time between working at the city hall's welfare center and caring for his younger brother.
- Bando Ryota as Michito Komori, Hiroto's younger brother. He has autism spectrum disorder, and works as an artist at Planet Eleven, a gallery for people with developmental disabilities.
- Tasuku Sato as Lion, a 6-year-old boy who suddenly arrives at the Komori home and refuses to leave or explain where he came from.
- Asuka Saitō as Mio Makimura, colleague of Hiroto
- Taiiku Okazaki as Yota Sadamoto, colleague of Hiroto
- Machiko Ono as Aoi Tachibana
- Osamu Mukai as Shougo Tachibana, son of the founder of a local construction company
- Sakurai Yuki as Kaede Kudo, reporter for a local tabloid
- Takumi Ozaki as Yuuma Amane, a fellow reporter for a local tabloid
- Noriko Iriyama as Kasumi Sugano, owner of a karaoke bar
- Hiraima Saaki as Mao Funaki, owner of Planet Eleven, the gallery where Michito works
- Yusaku Mori as Takehiro Onodera, a fellow artist at Planet Eleven
- Amane Okayama as X
- Denden as Torakichi Yoshimi, friend of the Komori family and restaurant owner
- Kakizawa Hayato as Kaiji Takada, a detective

== Production ==
Michito's paintings were created by Kosuke Ota, a painter with autism and intellectual disability.

== Release ==
The series started airing in October 2024 in Japan on TBS. It occupies the 22:00 slot on Friday. It has been broadcast internationally through Netflix and other stations.
