= Lillie (Pokémon) =

Central character in Pokémon

- Pokémon character
- Lillie, as seen in Pokémon Sun and Moon
- First appearance: Pokémon Sun and Moon (2016)
- Created by: Satoshi Tajiri
- Designed by: Ken Sugimori (concept); Shigeru Ohmori and Takao Unno (video games); Satoshi Nakano (anime)
- Voiced by: English: Laurie Hymes (anime) Jennifer Losi (Pokémon Masters) AmaLee (Pokémon Evolutions); Japanese: Kei Shindo (anime) Maaya Uchida (Pokémon Masters) Ai Kayano (Pokémon Evolutions)

Lillie (Japanese: リーリエ, Hepburn: Rīrie) is a character in Nintendo and Game Freak's Pokémon franchise, introduced in the 2016 video games Pokémon Sun and Moon, being a central character in the story, and has appeared in numerous Pokémon media.

== Concept and creation ==
Developed by Game Freak and published by Nintendo, the Pokémon video game series started in Japan in 1996 through the release of Pokémon Red and Blue for Game Boy. In the video game series, the players take on the role of a Pokémon Trainer whose goal is to catch and train pocket creatures known as Pokémon. Players use the special abilities of these creatures to battle against other Pokémon, both those found in the wild and those often used by other Pokémon Trainers.

In the Japanese version, Lillie uses 'watakushi', a personal pronoun which, when used outside of formal situations, makes a character seem either "prim and proper", "cultured", or "snobby".

Like various other protagonist characters in the Pokémon video game series, Lillie does not express verbal dialogue in the form of voice in Pokémon Sun and Moon and their sequels Ultra Sun and Ultra Moon.

== Appearances ==
Lillie first appears in Pokémon Sun and Moon. At the start of the game, she escapes from the Aether Paradise, a conservation area owned by the Aether Foundation, with the Legendary Pokémon Cosmog, whom she nicknames Nebby. Professor Kukui takes her on as his assistant after this, providing shelter for her and Nebby. After Nebby wanders off and the player character rescues it, she helps the player on their Island Challenge around the Alola region, while researching Nebby's origins. Later, Nebby is captured and brought to Aether Paradise. The player, their rivals Hau and Gladion, and Lillie, break into the Paradise to rescue Nebby, confronting the head of the organization, Lusamine, who is revealed to the player to be her and Gladion's mother. After Nebby evolves into Cosmoem and Lusamine disappears through a portal to the Ultra Space, a realm that links to numerous dimensions, that she forced Nebby to create, Lillie and the player head to the Altar on Poni Island, where using the mysterious items, the Sun Flute and the Moon Flute, they are able to get Nebby to evolve into either Solgaleo or Lunala, depending on the game version. They follow Lusamine into Ultra Space and rescue her. She departs for the Kanto region alongside her mother at the end of the game.

She later appears in Pokémon Ultra Sun and Ultra Moon, where she has a more prominent role and acts more as an assistant character than in Sun and Moon. In these games, she does not depart for Kanto, and instead becomes a trainer in Alola, assisting the player in stopping Team Rainbow Rocket in the postgame. She also appears in mobile game Pokémon Masters, paired with Clefairy, and has alternate pairings with Ribombee, Lunala, Solgaleo, Polteageist, Comfey, and Primarina.

Lillie appears in the Pokémon anime series, as a classmate of Ash Ketchum and a student of the Pokémon School. Lillie first appeared in the first episode of Pokémon the Series: Sun & Moon. In the anime, she has a fear of Pokémon, but slowly grows to become used to them. She partners with an Alolan Vulpix nicknamed Snowy, which hatched from a Pokémon egg, as her main Pokémon companion. She also appears in the second episode of Pokémon Evolutions, which recounts the events that took place at the Altar on Poni Island as they are depicted in the Ultra games. Just like the games, Lillie plays the Sun Flute. In manga, Lillie appeared in the Sun, Moon, Ultra Sun & Ultra Moon chapter of Pokémon Adventures as a shy preteen girl who stays with Professor Kukui's wife Professor Burnet. She is later revealed to be the younger sister of Gladion.

== Promotion and reception ==
The company Good Smile has produced multiple figurines of Lillie. A Nendoroid figurine was released in November 2017 depicting Lillie and the Pokémon Cosmog. She received another Nendoroid figurine as well as a Figma figurine, both of which were revealed at Wonder Festival 2018. People who pre-ordered the Figma figurine from either Good Smile or Pokémon Center Online got a hand dryer or hair brush respectively as well. Lillie has also appeared multiple times in the Pokémon Trading Card Game in its Sun and Moon expansion sets.

Since her appearance in Pokémon Sun and Moon, Lillie has received mostly positive reception. She is a popular character for fans of Sun and Moon. Chris Carter of Destructoid regarded her as one of the best aspects of Sun and Moon. Alex Donaldson of VG247 found Lillie "endearing", citing the "snappy" English localization for this. While Nick Wanserski did not think her decision to give up her "pacifist" ways to be justified, he nevertheless found the resolution with her mother to be well executed. Allegra Frank and Simone de Rochefort of Polygon regarded Lillie as one of the best women in video games in 2016. They note the emphasis the games put on her story, and how she works to overcome her limitations and comes out of her tribulations stronger. Frank also praised Ultra Sun and Ultra Moon for expanding on her story even further. She gave her praise for her appearance in the 999th and 1000th episodes of the Pokémon anime, praising how it handles her fear of Pokémon and calling her "sympathetic."

Dan Van Winkle of The Mary Sue expressed hope that a followup to the Sun and Moon games would star Lillie in the setting of Pokémon Red and Blue. Fellow contributor to The Mary Sue Paige Lyman regarded Lillie as the highlight of the game due to her character arc and the friendship that developed between the player character and Lillie. Meanwhile, Emily Reuben of Ball State Daily criticized Sun and Moon for devoting too much time to Lillie and taking away from the player character's story. She further criticized Ultra Sun and Ultra Moon for expanding her significance.

== Bibliography ==
- Allison, Anne (2006). Millennial Monsters: Japanese Toys and the Global Imagination. University of California Press. ISBN 978-0-5209-3899-1. Archived from the original on April 28, 2024.
