= Pokémon the Series: Sun & Moon =

Twentieth season of the Pokémon animated television series

- Season 20
- Japanese logo (top); International logo (bottom)
- No. of episodes: 43

Release
- Original network: TV Tokyo
- Original release: November 17, 2016 – September 21, 2017

Season chronology
- ← Previous; XYZ Next → Ultra Adventures

Pokémon the Series: Sun & Moon is the twentieth season of the Pokémon anime series and the first and titular season of Pokémon the Series: Sun & Moon, known in Japan as Pocket Monsters: Sun & Moon (ポケットモンスター サン&ムーン, Poketto Monsutā: San & Mūn).

The season follows Ash Ketchum as he attends the Pokémon School in the Alola region, befriends his classmates, Lillie, Lana, Mallow, Kiawe, Sophocles, and participates in the island challenge to master various Z-Moves.

The season originally aired in Japan from November 17, 2016, to September 21, 2017, on TV Tokyo, and in the United States from May 12, 2017, to December 9, 2017, on Disney XD, making it the first Pokémon series to premiere on that channel. Prior to this, a preview of the first two episodes aired on the network on December 5, 2016.

== Episode list ==
Jap. overall (Note: The English episode numbers are based on their first airing in the United States on Disney XD. Other English-speaking nations largely follow either this order or the Japanese order.)	Eng. overall	No. in season	English title Japanese title	Original release date	English air date
942	936	1	"Alola to New Adventure!" (Alola! New Islands, New Pokémon!!); Transliteration: "Arōra! Hajimete no shima, hajimete no Pokemon-tachi!!" (Japanese: アローラ! はじめての島、はじめてのポケモンたち!!)	November 17, 2016	December 5, 2016; February 11, 2017; March 17, 2017; May 12, 2017 (Note: These episodes were broadcast in the United States on December 5, 2016, as a sneak peek at the upcoming season, which had recently begun being broadcast in Japan. Previous sequences were broadcast on March 17, 2017.)
Ash, his mother Delia, Mimey, and Pikachu arrive at Melemele Island in the Alola region on vacation to deliver a Pokémon egg to Professor Oak's cousin, Samson Oak. While exploring for new Pokémon, Ash and Pikachu stumble upon the Pokémon school, of which Samson is the principal, and meets four students: Mallow, Lillie, Lana and Sophocles, as well as Professor Kukui. While helping defend the school from a group of Team Skull grunts, Ash witnesses another student, Kiawe, perform a Z-Move with his Pokémon to drive the grunts away. The night before Ash and his mother are due to return home, the Melemele Island Guardian Pokémon Tapu Koko, who has been watching Ash, appears to him and gives him a Z-Ring that will enable him to perform his own Z-Moves. With his mother's permission, Ash decides to stay in Alola and enroll in the Pokémon school to learn more about Alolan Pokémon.
943	937	2	"The Guardian's Challenge!" (Enter the Guardian Deity Kapu-Kokeko! Let Us Attempt to Master Our Z-Move!!); Transliteration: "Mamorigami Kapu Kokeko tōjō! Chōsen, ore-tachi no Z-waza!!" (Japanese: 守り神カプ・コケコ登場! 挑戦、オレたちのZワザ!!)	November 17, 2016	December 5, 2016; February 11, 2017; March 17, 2017; May 12, 2017
On Ash's first day at Pokémon school, Professor Kukui and the other students host a surprise welcome party for him, which includes contests against the other students' Pokémon. Soon after, Tapu Koko appears and battles Ash and Pikachu in order to test their ability to use the Z-Ring. Ash and Pikachu manage to unleash the Z-Move "Gigavolt Havoc", but the Electrium Z shatters after Pikachu's immense release of power. In order to regain the power of Z-Moves, Ash decides to undergo the island challenge.
944	938	3	"Loading the Dex!" (Good Rotomorning, I Am the Rotom Zukan Roto!); Transliteration: "Yorotoshiku, boku, Rotomu Zukan roto" (Japanese: よロトしく、ボク、ロトム図鑑ロト!)	November 24, 2016	May 13, 2017
Professor Kukui gives Ash a "Rotom-Dex", which is an intelligent Pokédex that is capable of human speech and powered by a Rotom. Ash goes to search for and catch his first Pokémon in Alola, finding a wild Mimikyu. He is interrupted by Team Rocket, who have arrived on the island under their own orders to acquire new Pokémon for Giovanni; Mimikyu, who despises Pikachu, willingly sides with Team Rocket to battle Ash's Pokémon. Before the battle can be decided, Team Rocket are carried off by a wild Bewear.
945	939	4	"First Catch in Alola, Ketchum-style!" (Enter Mokuroh! I Got a Pokémon in Alola!!); Transliteration: "Mokurō tōjō! Arōra de Pokemon getto da ze" (Japanese: モクロー登場! アローラでポケモンゲットだぜ!!)	November 24, 2016	May 14, 2017
After Ash fails to capture a Grubbin, he encounters a Rowlet that lives in a Toucannon nest with a flock of Pikipek and Trumbeak. After Ash feeds the starving Rowlet, it returns the favor by helping him fight off Team Rocket. Afterwards, Rowlet chooses to go with Ash. Ash catches Rowlet as his first Pokémon in Alola.
946	940	5	"Yo, Ho, Ho! Go, Popplio!" (Ashimari, Do Your Balloonest!); Transliteration: "Ashimari, ganbarūn!" (Japanese: シマリ、がんバルーン!)	December 1, 2016	May 15, 2017
Ash helps Lana train her Popplio to blow a water balloon large enough to enable undersea travel for people. During a school fishing trip, the class's Ride Pokémon are stolen by Team Rocket. Pikachu's Iron Tail frees all the Ride Pokémon, while Popplio manages to blow a massive water balloon to save them from falling onto the rocks.
947	941	6	"A Shocking Grocery Run!" (Zing Zap Togedemaru!); Transliteration: "Biribiri chikuchiku Togedemaru!" (Japanese: びりびりちくちくトゲデマル!)	December 8, 2016	May 16, 2017
Ash and Sophocles are separated from their Pokémon during a visit to the local shopping mall when Team Rocket accidentally activates the mall's security system. Pikachu, Rotom-Dex, and Togedemaru are trapped inside with Team Rocket, while Sophocles inadvertently reveals his greatest fear. A wild race through the mall ends in a roof-top battle.
948	942	7	"That's Why the Litten Is a Scamp!" (Nyabby, The Marketplace Wanderer!); Transliteration: "Ichiba no fūraibō Nyabī!" (Japanese: 市場の風来坊ニャビー!)	December 15, 2016	May 17, 2017
A stray Litten that Ash has encountered before continues to give him trouble. When he decides to catch it, he learns why it steals food from people. Later, Ash helps Litten deal with a mean Alolan Persian.
949	943	8	"Lillie's Egg-xhilarating Challenge!" (Who's in Charge of the Egg?); Transliteration: "Tamago-gakari wa dāre da?" (Japanese: タマゴ係はだ～れだ?)	December 22, 2016	May 18, 2017
Ash's class is assigned to look after a newly discovered Alolan Pokémon egg. When the class deliberates who will bring the egg home for the night, Lillie agrees to take care of the egg in order to overcome her fear of handling Pokémon. When she and Ash bring it home, a Salandit follows them. While Ash and Lillie's butler, Hobbes, are having a practice battle, the Salandit attacks Lillie and the egg.
950	944	9	"To Top a Totem!" (The Leader Pokémon Is Dekagoos!); Transliteration: "Nushi Pokemon wa Dekagūsu!" (Japanese: ぬしポケモンはデカグース!)	January 5, 2017	May 19, 2017
Ash meets Hala, the Kahuna of Melemele Island, who created his Z-Ring. As part of Ash's first Island Trial Challenge, Hala tasks him with finding a solution to an infestation of Rattata and Raticate without fighting them. Thanks to his friends' suggestion, Ash decides to recruit the local Yungoos and Gumshoos. However, Ash must defeat their leader, the Totem Pokémon Gumshoos, in battle in order to earn their cooperation, with Tapu Koko secretly observing.
951	945	10	"Trial and Tribulation!" (Will the Z-Move Work?! Challenging the Grand Trial!!); Transliteration: "Deru ka Z-waza! Daishiren e no chōsen!!" (Japanese: 出るかZワザ! 大試練への挑戦!!)	January 12, 2017	May 20, 2017
The time has come for Ash to confront Hala in order to win his first Island Grand Trial Challenge in Alola using the Z-Crystal he obtained from the Totem Gumshoos. After the battle, Hala rewards Ash with a Fightinium Z, but Tapu Koko intervenes and replaces it with an Electrium Z.
952	946	11	"Young Kiawe Had a Farm!" (Satoshi Visits Kaki!); Transliteration: "Satoshi, kaki n chi ni iku!" (Japanese: サトシ、カキんちに行く!)	January 19, 2017	May 27, 2017
Ash and Pikachu visit Akala Island with Kiawe, where Kiawe's family runs a dairy farm. Some Team Skull grunts interfere when Ash and Kiawe are on their way with a special delivery.
953	947	12	"The Sun, the Scare, the Secret Lair!" (The Extracurricular Lesson is on Hidoide?!); Transliteration: "Kagai jugyō wa Hidoide!?" (Japanese: 課外授業はヒドイデ!?)	January 26, 2017	June 3, 2017
Professor Kukui takes Ash and the other students to the beach for a special lesson. After encountering a bunch of Mareanie, the group splits up to find and observe Pokémon. Ash, Pikachu, and Rotom-Dex are searching for Pokémon to observe when they run into Team Rocket, who are under pressure from their boss to catch new Pokémon in the Alola region. One Mareanie causes trouble for Ash and his Pokémon when it decides to help Team Rocket, especially James.
954	948	13	"Racing to a Big Event!" (The Great Alola Pancake Race!); Transliteration: "Arōra Pankēki dai rēsu!" (Japanese: アローラパンケーキ大レース!)	February 2, 2017	June 10, 2017
Mallow tells Ash about the Pokémon Pancake Race and suggests that he join in. Ash agrees and finds his main rival to be the Pancake waitress Nina, who has an Alolan Raichu and is also the race's previous champion. During the race, Team Rocket, who want the grand prize of a year's supply of free pancakes, enter both Mimikyu and a mechanical Bewear powered by Meowth and Wobbuffet. Mimikyu is disqualified for using a Pokémon attack against Pikachu that also eliminates Bounsweet and Popplio. The mechanical Bewear later self-destructs, and Team Rocket is carried off once again by the real Bewear. With Pikachu and Raichu distracted, the Principal's Komala wins the race at the last moment. Pikachu and Raichu tie for second place. Later at the Pokémon School, Lillie's egg begins to hatch.
955	949	14	"Getting to Know You!" (The Fruit of Courage: Lilie and Rokon!); Transliteration: "Yūki no kesshō, Rīrie to Rokon!" (Japanese: 勇気の結晶、リーリエとロコン!)	February 9, 2017	June 17, 2017
Lillie's egg, which she had named "Snowy" in the previous episode, hatches into an Alolan Vulpix and the principal's egg hatches into a normal Vulpix. The fire-type Vulpix starts playing with Pikachu, Togedemaru, Popplio, and the others, while Snowy (an ice-type) ignores the others. Finally, it decides to accept Lillie as its trainer and enters Lillie's Pokéball on its own. Lillie decides to spend some time alone with her newfound partner and takes a walk with Snowy, while being followed secretly by Mallow and Ash. Team Rocket also starts following them and soon corners Lillie and Snowy. Although Lillie tries to put up a fight with Snowy using Powder Snow, Team Rocket dominates her in battle. She and Snowy are saved by Ash and Mallow. Lillie finally is able to touch a Pokémon, although she is only able to touch Snowy for now.
956	950	15	"Rocking Clawmark Hill!" (Scratchmark Hill, Iwanko and Lugarugan!!); Transliteration: "Tsumeato no oka, Iwanko to Rugarugan!!" (Japanese: 爪あとの丘、イワンコとルガルガン!!)	February 23, 2017	June 24, 2017
Ash and Professor Kukui notice that the Rockruff that lives with Professor Kukui is disappearing at night and returning the next morning badly injured. Following it, they find out that Rockruff is participating in a secret Pokémon training ground. Ash decides to help Rockruff train, and Rockruff learns to use Rock Throw. After Rockruff defeats a Magmar that previously defeated it, Professor Kukui decides to leave Rockruff in Ash's care.
957	951	16	"They Might Not Be Giants!" (Three Little Pokémon, One Big Adventure!!); Transliteration: "Chiisana san-biki, ōkina bōken!!" (Japanese: 小さな三匹、大きな冒険!!)	March 2, 2017	July 1, 2017
While training on a beach, Lana's Popplio and Ash's Rowlet are caught inside one of Popplio's balloons, which is blown away by a strong wind. Rowlet bursts the balloon open, and they both crash into Team Rocket's secret base. Meowth and Mareanie chase after them, but they are rescued by Litten. While Ash, Lana, and Mallow search for the missing pair, Litten takes them to where it has been staying with the old Stoutland. Stoutland asks Litten to help them find their trainers, but Team Rocket is also hunting them.
958	952	17	"Crystal-Clear Sleuthing!" (Alola Detective Rotom! The Mystery of the Lost Crystal!!); Transliteration: "Arōra tantei Rotomu! Kieta kurisutaru no nazo!!" (Japanese: アローラ探偵ロトム! 消えたクリスタルの謎!!)	March 9, 2017	July 1, 2017
Ash's Electrium Z-crystal is missing. Rotom, who is a big fan of an Alolan detective TV show, is prompted to try and find it with Pikachu as his assistant, getting a new video camera function in the course of the story. In the meantime, Ash and the other students are all desperate to keep Kiawe, the only other Z-ring wearer, from finding out about the missing Z-crystal out of fear of his anger.
959	953	18	"A Seasoned Search!" (Really? Mao's Great Culinary Plan!); Transliteration: "Majii!? Mao no oryōri dai sakusen!!" (Japanese: マジィ!? マオのお料理大作戦!!)	March 16, 2017	July 1, 2017
Mallow invites her classmates to her restaurant to taste her version of Alola's legendary stew. Unfortunately, her use of Pikachu's electric shock to cook it does not go over so well. It turns out that she is missing an important ingredient known as the rare Yellow Nectar. Ash and Pikachu decide to help Mallow gather some nectar. Their plan is to use an Oricorio to find it, but finding one is not so easy. Meanwhile, Ash's Rowlet seems to have developed feelings for Mallow's Bounsweet, but the feelings are not reciprocated. Team Rocket turns up once again, but this time instead of stealing Pikachu they plan to steal all of the nectar. However, their interference causes Bounsweet to evolve into a Steenee with a devastating slap attack.
960	954	19	"A Guardian Rematch!" (Intense Electric Shock Training! A Rematch with Kapu-Kokeko!!); Transliteration: "Dengeki mō tokkun! Kapu Kokeko to no saisen!!" (Japanese: 電撃猛特訓! カプ・コケコとの再戦!!)	March 23, 2017	July 1, 2017
Ash begins training for a possible rematch against Tapu Koko. Sophocles helps out with scientific methods that yields surprising results. Naturally, this arouses Tapu Koko's interest. Tapu Koko challenges Ash and Pikachu with the whole Pokémon school looking on.
961	955	20	"Partner Promises!" (The Promise Between Satoshi and Pikachu); Transliteration: "Satoshi to Pikachū, futari no yakusoku" (Japanese: サトシとピカチュウ、二人の約束)	April 6, 2017	July 1, 2017
On the advice of a local shopkeeper, Ash and Pikachu kayak to Treasure Island, where there are lots of wild Pokémon. After watching a group of Crabrawler, following a Cutiefly to a meadow full of friendly bug Pokémon and having fun with a group of Alolan Exeggutor, they are overrun by a school of Wimpod who try to steal their snacks. Preparing to return home, they find a Wimpod trapped inside a blocked cave. With the help of one of the Exeggutor from earlier, they manage to reach and free Wimpod, who thanks Ash before returning to its school. Ash and Pikachu see another Island Guardian, Tapu Lele, who heals Ash's bruised hands.
962	956	21	"One Journey Ends, Another Begins..." (It's Time for Nyabby to Move On!); Transliteration: "Nyabī, tabidachi no toki!" (Japanese: ニャビー、旅立ちの時!)	April 6, 2017	July 1, 2017
Ash and Pikachu run into Litten again, but this time something's very wrong with its friend, the old Stoutland. Ash carries Stoutland to the Pokémon Center, where Ash, Pikachu, and Rotom learn that while Stoutland isn't seriously ill, it is getting very old and there is nothing Nurse Joy can do to help it. Litten and Stoutland escape from the Pokémon Center and return to their riverside den, where Stoutland passes away in the night. After realizing what has happened, Litten is heart-broken and refuses to be comforted by anyone. After Litten finally comes to terms with the loss of its friend, Ash asks Litten to join him, and Litten decides to test him by battling against Pikachu. When the battle ends in a draw, Litten chooses to become one of Ash's Pokémon. Team Rocket's Meowth, who for reasons of his own has been secretly watching everything, seems pleased by the outcome.
963	957	22	"A Shivering Shovel Search!" (Beware of Shovels!!!); Transliteration: "Sukoppu ni yōchūi!!!" (Japanese: スコップに要注意!!!)	April 13, 2017	July 8, 2017
While training Litten, who is having trouble mastering Fire Fang, Ash accidentally incurs the wrath of an unfriendly Sandygast when Rockruff's Rock Throw knocks the shovel off its head. Ash's attempt to temporarily replace it with Rotom-Dex only makes things worse. In a rage, Sandygast evolves into Palossand and swallows up Ash and also Litten when it tries to rescue him. With both Litten and Rotom-Dex affected by Palossand's energy drain, it is up to the rest of Ash's classmates to save them.
964	958	23	"Getting the Band Back Together!" (Shocking! A Dugtrio Split-Up?!); Transliteration: "Shōgeki! Dagutorio kaisan?!" (Japanese: 衝撃! ダグトリオ解散!?)	April 20, 2017	July 15, 2017
Ash and his classmates are excited to see DJ Leo, a popular local musician and old friend of Professor Kukui's who plays music with his Alolan Dugtrio. After a dancing Alolan Diglett joins the group, the Dugtrio start quarreling among themselves as to which of them should take center stage. Amid the threat of a split-up, Team Rocket steps in to try and steal Dugtrio.
965	959	24	"Alolan Open House!" (Alola! The First Visitors Day!!); Transliteration: "Arōra! Hajimete no jugyō sankan!!" (Japanese: アローラ! はじめての授業参観!!)	April 27, 2017	July 22, 2017
When the Pokémon School announces a special Visitors Day, Ash's mother Delia and Mimey come for a visit. Delia charms everyone, including all of Ash's Alolan Pokémon (especially Litten). Meanwhile, Ash is reluctantly trying to prepare a report he has to give in front of his classmates, the school visitors and his own mother. When the Team Skull grunts crash the festivities on Tauros and start causing mayhem, Ash, Delia and Ash's Pokémon team up to drive them off.
966	960	25	"A Team-on-Team Tussle!" (The Battle for the Crystal! Rocket Gang VS Skull Gang!!); Transliteration: "Kurisutaru sōdatsu-sen! Roketto-dan tai Sukaru-dan!!" (Japanese: クリスタル争奪戦! ロケット団対スカル団!!)	May 4, 2017	July 29, 2017
When Team Rocket see Ash and Kiawe demonstrating Z-moves, they plot to find Z-crystals for themselves. While searching, Team Rocket run into Team Skull. Both gangs spot a Darkinium Z-crystal embedded in a large rock. The problem is, the rock is the current lair of the Raticate and Rattata infestation from earlier. The two gangs compete to acquire the Z-crystal. Team Rocket emerges the winners, but find out that having the Z-crystal in their possession is one thing, but figuring out how to use it is another.
967	961	26	"So Long, Sophocles!" (Goodbye, Māmane!); Transliteration: "Sayonara Māmane!" (Japanese: さよならマーマネ!)	May 11, 2017	August 5, 2017
Sophocles and his family may be moving away, so Sophocles will have to leave the Pokémon school and all his friends. Even though he tries to keep the news from his classmates, they can see that both he and Togedemaru are very upset. Ash and his friends work together to cheer up Sophocles with a farewell party. However, when Sophocles finds out he's made a mistake, he finds it very hard to tell his friends.
968	962	27	"A Glaring Rivalry!" (Come Forth! The Crimson Glare of Lugarugan!!); Transliteration: "Ide yo! Akaki manazashi Rugarugan!!" (Japanese: 出でよ! 紅き眼差しルガルガン!!)	May 18, 2017	August 19, 2017
A trainer named Gladion, dressed in black, battling with a powerful fiery-eyed Lycanroc and wearing a Z-ring, has appeared on Melemele Island. After seeing them in action, Ash naturally wants to battle Gladion. However, he's totally shocked when Lillie appears and calls Gladion her brother. Gladion seems cold towards Lillie and at first refuses Ash's challenge, but then learns that Ash got his Z-ring from Tapu Koko and has actually battled the Island Guardian. That night, Gladion's Umbreon delivers a note to Ash agreeing to battle. It's Ash's Rockruff versus Gladion's Lycanroc! However, Team Rocket, who saw Gladion defeat the Team Skull grunts earlier, can't resist getting involved. Ash and Gladion must work together to rescue Pikachu and Lycanroc.
969	963	28	"Pulling Out the Pokémon Base Pepper!" (The Fierce Pokébase Match! Go for a Tide-Turning Home Run!!); Transliteration: "Nettō Pokebēsu! Nerae gyakuten hōmuran!!" (Japanese: 熱闘ポケベース! ねらえ逆転ホームラン!!)	May 25, 2017	August 26, 2017
Pokémon Base, a version of baseball in which both humans and Pokémon are players, is extremely popular in the Alolan Islands, and naturally Ash and his friends are big fans. Professor Kukui, Principal Oak, and human Pokémon Base star Olu'olu act as judges in a spirited game between the students (Ash, Pikachu, Sophocles, Togedemaru, Lana and Popplio vs. Kiawe, Turtonator, Mallow, Steenee, Lillie and Snowy). After Team Rocket's Meowth gets beaned by Lana's home run ball, Jessie, who has a crush on Olu'olu, drags Team Rocket into a game against the students with Olu'olu's autograph as the prize. It's Ash, Pikachu, Rockruff, Kiawe, Olu'olu, and his Snorlax against James, Mareanie, Jessie, Wobbuffet, Mimikyu, and Meowth.
970	964	29	"Lulled to La-La Land!" (Are You Going to Sleep in the Nemashu Forest Too?); Transliteration: "Nemashu no mori de anata mo nemashu?" (Japanese: ネマシュの森であなたも寝ましゅ?)	June 8, 2017	September 2, 2017
Ash and his classmates go on a camping trip in the forest. The trip does not start out well when Lana scares them all with a ghost story about a traveler who had all his energy drained from him, while he was asleep. However, they have no idea that they are being spied on by a mysterious Pokémon. One by one, the gang except for Lillie is attacked, knocked out, and their energy drained from them. The culprit turns out to be a hungry Morelull. Ash figures out a way that the Morelull can get all the energy it needs from him, and later the gang finds out why the Morelull needs so much energy.
971	965	30	"The Ol' Raise and Switch!" (Lilie, Take Good Care of Pikachu); Transliteration: "Rīrie, Pikachū o kawaigatte agete ne" (Japanese: リーリエ、ピカチュウをかわいがってあげてね)	June 15, 2017	September 9, 2017
As part of a class assignment, each of the students must take care of each other's Pokémon partner for the weekend. Pikachu gets to stay with Lillie at her mansion, and Lillie is determined to try and overcome her fear of getting close to Pokémon, so she uses Ash's methods to gain Pikachu's trust. At Lana's home, Turtonator is having trouble with her twin sisters, while Mallow also has problems with Togedemaru while working at her family restaurant. Sophocles's experiments with Steenee don't work out well, but he finds that Steenee can be a great night-time comfort. At his family's dairy farm, Kiawe assigns Popplio to work with his younger sister Mimo, but later finds the water Pokémon to be a great problem-solver with the farm's Tauros. Snowy keeps giving Ash the cold shoulder but finally warms up to him when Ash includes Snowy in his Pokémon's training sessions.
972	966	31	"The Island Whisperer!" (Lychee Appears! Laugh and Cry, Island Queen!!); Transliteration: "Raichi tōjō! Naitewaratte, shima kuīn!!" (Japanese: ライチ登場! 泣いて笑って、島クイーン!!)	June 22, 2017	September 16, 2017
Olivia, the Akala Island Kahuna, and her Lycanroc appear at the school just in time to stop a fight between Kiawe's Charizard and a Tauros. She completely wins over everybody's Pokémon, including Litten. The class and Professor Kukui will be traveling to Akala Island for a special practical class under Olivia's supervision. On the way, they encounter various types of Sea Pokémon. After Ash and Pikachu join Olivia in an underwater swim, they find a Wailmer trapped in a rock crevice by a vicious Bruxish. Now they have to help the Wailmer and fend off the Bruxish at the same time.
973	967	32	"Treasure Hunt, Akala Style!" (Finding the Treasure! Mooland Searching!!); Transliteration: "Otakara hakken! Mūrando sāchi!!" (Japanese: お宝発見! ムーランドサーチ!!)	June 29, 2017	September 23, 2017
As part of Olivia's practical lesson on Akala Island, the gang are sent on treasure hunts across the island mounted on Stoutland, each of which reacts differently to its rider: Ash's Stoutland is extremely friendly and enthusiastic, Lana's Stoutland does not seem to like her, and Lillie has trouble even getting close to her Stoutland. In the first round, Ash finds three gemstones, Mallow finds giant mushrooms, Kiawe finds a large fossil, Lana and Sophocles find nothing and Lillie is still trying to approach her Stoutland. In the second round, Lana and Popplio run into a hostile Pokémon which is fought off by her Stoutland, an Alolan Geodude Ash mistakes for a fossil gets away when he tries to catch it, Mallow finds a giant fruit, Kiawe finds another fossil, Sophocles uses technology to find a piece of meteorite, and Lana finds a lump of metal that can be made into a Z-ring, making her the winner. At last, Lillie uses her experiences with Snowy and Pikachu to finally get close to her Stoutland.
974	968	33	"Big Sky, Small Fry!" (The Mighty Yowashi, Totem of the Lake!); Transliteration: "Yowashi tsuyoshi, ike no nushi!" (Japanese: ヨワシ強し、池のぬし!)	July 6, 2017	September 30, 2017
With no class today, Ash and Lana go Pokémon-fishing, but they may end up catching more than they bargained for since the lagoon they're fishing in may contain a water-type Totem Pokémon. If there is, then Lana is determined to battle it. Meanwhile, Kiawe takes the rest of the gang to visit his family's dairy farm (where they're more interested in sampling the produce then in helping him), and Team Rocket doesn't have much luck with their own Totem Pokémon-fishing, especially when it's interrupted by Bewear.
975	969	34	"A Crowning Moment of Truth!" (A Fiery Battle! Garagara Appears!!); Transliteration: "Honō no batoru! Garagara arawaru!!" (Japanese: 炎のバトル! ガラガラあらわる!!)	July 20, 2017	October 7, 2017
Ash and his friends go to the Wela Volcano Festival, where an Alolan Marowak appears and takes the "Wela Crown", which supposedly has the power to make Pokémon stronger. Ash and Kiawe chase after it, which leads to a fierce battle between Marowak and Kiawe's Turtonator in which, even when using a Z-move, Turtonator is defeated. Kiawe is devastated and disheartened by the loss, but Ash and Turtonator encourage him. The next day, Kiawe and Turtonator face Marowak in a rematch, but this time Turtonator wins. Marowak not only returns the crown but also decides to join Kiawe as one of his Pokémon, in the process developing a rivalry with Turtonator.
976	970	35	"Currying Favor and Flavor!" (Curry-ficent Battle! The Lalantes Dance!!); Transliteration: "Karē-na batoru! Rarantesu no mai!!" (Japanese: カレーなバトル! ラランテスの舞!!)	July 27, 2017	October 14, 2017
Olivia and Professor Kukui send the class out to find ingredients for Akalan Curry in groups of two. The team of Ash and Mallow find their task more challenging than expected, especially in getting past angry Fomantis, Parasect and Alolan Diglett. Their search for the final ingredient brings them face-to-face with a Totem Lurantis. Ash and his Pokémon must now battle Lurantis and its partner Castform, but there may be more to this than meets the eye.
977	971	36	"Trials and Determinations!" (Lychee's Grand Trial! The Hardest Pokémon Match!!); Transliteration: "Raichi no dai shiren! Ichiban hādona Pokemon shōbu!!" (Japanese: ライチの大試練! 一番ハードなポケモン勝負!!)	August 3, 2017	October 21, 2017
The time has come for Ash, now armed with his new Grassium Z-crystal, to face Olivia in the Akala Island Grand Trial Challenge, and Rockruff wants to battle Lycanroc even before the Trial gets underway. This will be a Double Battle; Olivia brings out a Probopass to partner her Lycanroc, and Ash chooses Rowlet to partner Rockruff. The battle is intense, with both Olivia and Ash using Z-moves. With Ash's new Grassium Z-move Bloom Doom, Rowlet defeats Probopass, but then the unthinkable happens: Rockruff wants to battle Lycanroc so fiercely that it attacks Rowlet without thinking when Ash orders Rowlet to help Rockruff. Rockruff is horrified by what it's done, but Ash forgives and encourages his Pokémon, and Rockruff goes on to defeat Lycanroc. Olivia presents Ash with a Rockium Z-crystal and tells him that Rockruff may evolve soon. Tapu-Lele appears to honor Ash and Rockruff.
978	972	37	"Rising from the Ruins!" (Iwanko and the Guardian Deity of the Ruins of Life!); Transliteration: "Iwanko to inochi no iseki no mamorigami!" (Japanese: イワンコといのちの遺跡の守り神!)	August 10, 2017	October 28, 2017
Rockruff, now close to evolving, goes off on its own during the night and encounters Akala Island guardian Tapu Lele. Rockruff battles Tapu Lele but is easily defeated. Concerned for Rockruff, Ash and Pikachu chase after and find Rockruff, but Rockruff attacks Ash and, immediately ashamed, runs away. The next day, everyone else joins in the search for Rockruff, including Olivia's Lycanroc. Rockruff, injured after falling into a river, is found by both Olivia's and Gladion's Lycanroc and brought to the Ruins of Life. Ash arrives with Olivia and Professor Kukui in time to stop the Island Guardian from battling the two Lycanroc. Using energy from Ash and both Lycanroc, Tapu Lele heals Rockruff, who then evolves into Dusk Form Lycanroc.
979	973	38	"Mimikyu Unmasked!" (Mimikkyu's Disguise!); Transliteration: "Mimikkyu no bake no kawa" (Japanese: ミミッキュのばけのかわ!)	August 17, 2017	November 4, 2017
Ash and his friends have returned to Melemele Island, but Team Rocket is there to welcome them by trying to steal Pikachu once again! When Ash's new Z-move Continental Crush fails, Kiawe's Z-move sends Team Rocket blasting off. However, Bewear fails to appear and Team Rocket crashes separately, with Jessie and Mimikyu landing in a shopping mall. Mimikyu's disguise has been badly damaged, so Jessie first devises a temporary disguise from a paper bag and then tries to find something new. While James, Meowth, and Wobbuffet search for their missing partner, Ash and Lycanroc try to master Continental Crush. Jessie eventually repairs Mimikyu's Pikachu disguise, but it is stolen by a flock of Murkrow who were actually after Jessie's malasada. James, Meowth, and Wobbuffet catch up to Jessie just as she retrieves both disguise and malasada. The angry Murkrow return in force, but Mimikyu resumes its Pikachu disguise and drives them off. Full of confidence in their closer bond, Jessie and Mimikyu challenge Ash again. However, Ash and Lycanroc have mastered Continental Crush and send Team Rocket blasting off again, but this time Bewear rescues them.
980	974	39	"Mallow and the Forest Teacher!" (Mao's Runaway from Home and Yareyuutan!); Transliteration: "Iede no Mao to Yareyūtan" (Japanese: 家出のマオとヤレユータン!)	August 24, 2017	November 11, 2017
A television crew has come to Mallow's family restaurant, outside of which Team Rocket has set up an unsuccessful competing food truck. However, when Mallow's father overworks her and appears unappreciative of her efforts, she loses her temper and runs off with Steenee in pursuit. Naturally, Team Rocket sees an opportunity and chases after them. When Mallow knocks herself out in a fall, she is found and cared for by a Oranguru. While Mallow's remorseful father and the gang search for Mallow, Team Rocket captures Steenee. Oranguru's psychic powers free Steenee, and the two combined prove more than a match for Team Rocket. Bewear appears, but it and Oranguru refuse to fight each other, and Team Rocket is once again carried off. When Mallow's father and the gang arrive, Mallow's father recognizes Oranguru as his cooking teacher, and he and Mallow reconcile.
981	975	40	"Balloons, Brionne, and Belligerence!" (Ashimari, Osyamari, and the Anch-gry Dadarin!); Transliteration: "Ashimari, Oshamari, ikari no Dadarin!" (Japanese: アシマリ、オシャマリ、いかりのダダリン!)	August 31, 2017	November 18, 2017
Lana and Popplio have been practicing the Z-move Hydro Vortex, but so far with no success, and Lana is feeling discouraged. Ash, Lana, and Mallow meet a performing Brionne and its trainer Ida who possesses a Z-ring with a Waterium Z-crystal and can perform Hydro Vortex. Lana begs Ida to teach her. Ida and Brionne are helping her boyfriend, Kanoa, to search for a mysterious Mystic Water that may be located in the wreck of a sunken ship, and Ash, Lana, Mallow and their Pokémon join in to help. When Team Rocket try to steal the Mystic Water, they anger a Dhelmise that's been living on the wreck and trick it into attacking Kanoa's boat. When Brionne is knocked out and Dhelmise creates a deadly whirlpool, Lana and Popplio are able to use Hydro Vortex to defeat Dhelmise. With everyone safe, Kanoa finds the Mystic Water and gives it to Ida.
982	976	41	"Mounting an Electrifying Charge!" (Dash! Dendimushi); Transliteration: "Dasshu! Dendimushi" (Japanese: ダッシュ! デンヂムシ)	September 7, 2017	November 25, 2017
Sophocles enters a special race with a miniature car powered by his Charjabug against other Charjabug-cars. Ash and Kiawe are keen to help, with Ash acting as track partner and Kiawe as mechanic. The problem is that Charjabug can't seem to generate enough power to make its car run very fast, but it gets stronger and faster with all three Trainers' help. On the day of the race, they find that they have a rival team with a flashy Charjabug-car and a very arrogant attitude. Team Rocket has also entered the race, with James as track partner, Jessie as track spotter, Wobbuffet/Mareanie supposedly as mechanic, and a fake Charjabug-car run by Meowth inside it. The race has three stages: 1) a rocky terrain, 2) a desert terrain, and 3) an urban area, each with obstacles powered by a Pokémon. However, with Sophocles as track spotter, some unorthodox moves and teamwork and Team Rocket's cheating exposed, Team Sophocles puts up a good fight. Ash is knocked unconscious in the urban area, but Sophocles takes over as track partner, and he and Charjabug bring in the victory.
983	977	42	"Alola, Kanto!" (Kanto, Alola! Takeshi and Kasumi!!); Transliteration: "Kantō de Arōra! Takeshi to Kasumi!!" (Japanese: カントーでアローラ! タケシとカスミ!!)	September 14, 2017	November 25, 2017
Ash returns to Kanto with his friends, their Pokémon, Professor Kukui and Principal Oak as part of a special school project about the differences between Kanto and Alolan Pokémon. Misty and Brock are waiting for him at the airport, and Brock shows he hasn't changed as he first cares for Lillie's Snowy and then chases after a pretty flight attendant. The gang from Alola have a grand time with their Pokémon seeing and interacting with their Kanto counterparts at Professor Oak's lab. Ash's herd of Tauros naturally stampede on him, and he happily reunites with his Bulbasaur and Muk. Kiawe races a Rapidash on his Ride Charizard and then rides it. Mallow and Steenee have an unfortunate interaction with a Kanto Vileplume. Sophocles and Togedemaru meet a Kanto Raichu with shocking results. Snowy meets a Kanto Ninetales. Lana and Popplio meet a Kanto Dewgong and then swim with Misty and other Water Pokémon. As Ash, Misty, and Brock remember old times, it's great to see that some things haven't changed (Misty is still terrified of Bug Pokémon). Team Rocket have also returned to Kanto on orders, and their latest (and old-school) plot to steal everyone's Pokémon using a giant mecha reunites the original trio as battling partners including Ash's Lycanroc, Misty's Staryu, and Brock's Crobat. However, the battle is once again interrupted by Bewear (wearing a jet-pack!), and another old acquaintance, Jigglypuff, finishes things off in its usual fashion. The day ends with a magnificent outdoor feast prepared by Delia and Mr. Mime, spied upon by Mew!
984	978	43	"When Regions Collide!" (Gym Battle! Z-Move VS Mega Evolution!!); Transliteration: "Jimu batoru! Z-Waza tai Mega Shinka!!" (Japanese: ジムバトル! Zワザ対メガシンカ!!)	September 21, 2017	December 9, 2017
The previous day was all fun, but the next day brings more interesting things for Ash and the Alolan visitors as they and their Pokémon travel to Misty's Gym in Cerulean City. After explaining about Gym Battles and Pokémon Leagues, Professor Kukui announces that the class will be engaging in Gym Battles against Brock and Misty. After two practice battles (Mallow, Steenee, Lana and Popplio vs. Misty and Psyduck and Lillie, Snowy, Sophocles and Togedemaru vs. Brock and Geodude), real Gym Battles will now be fought: Kiawe vs. Brock and Ash vs. Misty, but each battle is taken to a new level with Brock and Misty both revealing they have Key Stones and using Mega-Evolution. Kiawe's Z-Move Inferno Overdrive proves useless against Brock's Mega-Evolved Steelix and Turtonator is defeated, but Ash and Pikachu's unorthodox strategy and his Z-move Gigavolt Havoc defeat Misty's Mega-Evolved Gyarados.

== Music ==
The Japanese opening songs are "Alola!!" (アローラ!!, Arōra!!) by Satoshi / Ash Ketchum (Rica Matsumoto) with Pikachu (Ikue Otani) for 29 episodes, and the Japanese opening theme song of Pokémon the Movie: I Choose You!, "Aim to Be a Pokémon Master (20th Anniversary)" (めざせポケモンマスター (20th Anniversary), Mezase Pokémon Masutā (20th Anniversary)) by Rica Matsumoto, for 14 episodes to promote the movie. The ending song is "Pose" (ポーズ, Pōzu) by Taiiku Okazaki, and the English opening song is "Under the Alolan Sun" by Jannel Candrice and The Sad Truth, featuring composer Ed Goldfarb. Its instrumental version serves as the ending theme.

== Home media releases ==
Viz Media and Warner Home Video released the entire series on a single 6-disc boxset on DVD in the United States on May 21, 2019.
