= Taiiku Okazaki =

Japanese musician

Taiiku Okazaki 岡崎 体育
- Born: Akitoshi Oka (岡 亮聡, Oka Akitoshi); July 3, 1989 (age 37); Nishinomiya, Hyōgo Prefecture, Japan
- Genres: Techno, pop music, easycore, Pop-Punk
- Occupations: Singer, songwriter, actor
- Years active: 2012–present
- Label: SME Records
- Website: okazakitaiiku.com

Akitoshi Oka (岡 亮聡, Oka Akitoshi; born July 3, 1989), known professionally by the stage name Taiiku Okazaki (岡崎 体育, Okazaki Taiiku), is a Japanese musician and songwriter who is signed to SME Records. Beginning his career as an independent musician in 2012, he made his major debut with the release of his first major album Basin Techno in 2016. The album includes the song "Music Video", which became a viral hit in Japan for parodying common tropes used in music videos. That same year, he performed the song "Pose", which was used as the first closing theme for the anime series Pokémon: Sun & Moon. He has also written music for commercials and for other musicians.

== Biography ==
Oka was born in Nishinomiya, Hyōgo Prefecture on July 3, 1989. When he was around three years old, he and his family moved to Uji, Kyoto Prefecture, where he would spend much of his early life. While in elementary school, he started learning to play the piano and became part of a local baseball team. His interest in music began at an early age, when he began listening to artists such as Eminem, Queen, and Deep Purple. To further his music skills, he would compose songs on the Nintendo DS game Daigasso! Band Brothers.

Upon graduating from high school, Oka enrolled at Doshisha University and started working part-time at a video store. He then became part of a band called Aishinkakura Nuruhachi (愛新覚羅ヌルハチ), which disbanded after a year when one of its members emigrated to America. He then became part of another music group, while starting a new part-time job at a supermarket.

Following his graduation from university in 2012, Oka began his music career as an independent musician under the stage name Taiiku Okazaki. His first three releases were albums titled Greatest Hits, Koi no Hello Keihō (恋のハロー警報, Koi no Harō Keihō), and Phantom Seishōnen (ファントム青少年, Fantomu Seishōnen). The following year, he released two more albums, Bonchi Hero Kenzan (盆地ヒーロー見参, Bonchi hīrō kenzan) and Fictional Zodiac.

In 2016, Okazaki made his major debut on the SME Records label with the release of the album Basin Techno. The album ranked first on iTunes's J-Pop chart, and peaked at number 9 on Oricon's Weekly Album Charts. The song "Music Video" from the album became a viral hit in Japan for its lyrics and music video, which parodied commonly used tropes in Japanese music videos.

That same year, he began performing songs for various commercials, as well as writing music for other artists. He then performed two songs for anime series: "Shiokaze" (潮風), which was used as the opening theme for The Great Passage, and "Pose" (ポーズ), which was used as the first closing theme for Pokémon: Sun & Moon; "Shiokaze" was released as his first single on December 7, 2016.

In 2017, Okazaki released his second major album, XXL, which peaked at number 2 on Oricon's Weekly Album Charts. The album includes the song "Natural Lips", which features lyrics that are in Japanese but sung in a way that makes them resemble English words. The following year, he performed the song "Jari Boy Jari Girl" (ジャリボーイ・ジャリガール, Jaribōi Jarigāru), which was used as a closing theme for Pokémon: Sun & Moon. He released his third major album, OT Works, in April 2018; the album peaked at number 18 on Oricon's Weekly Album Charts. In October of that year, his song "Kimi no Bōken" (キミの冒険) began to be used as the fourth opening theme to Pokémon: Sun & Moon.

Okazaki released his fourth studio album, Saitama, on January 9, 2019; the album peaked at number 5 on Oricon's Weekly Album Charts. He made a voice acting cameo in Pokémon Sun and Moon as a rapping Team Skull member. He held a solo live concert at the Saitama Super Arena on June 9, 2019, and at Yokohama Arena on November 23, 2021. A Zepp TOUR from April to May 2024 was also held. All of these has been sold out in its entirety.

== Discography ==
=== Singles / EPs ===
Title	Peak Oricon position	Peak Billboard position
"Shiokaze" (潮風): Release date: December 7, 2016	42	— (Note: Charted at number 44 on the Top Singles Sales chart.)
"Suplex"		

=== Albums ===
Title	Peak Oricon position	Peak Billboard position
Basin Techno: Release date: May 18, 2016	9	11
XXL: Release date: June 14, 2017	2	2
OT Works: Release date: April 25, 2018	18	33
Saitama: Release date: January 9, 2019	5	5
Pokemon the Movie: Koko's Theme Songs	19	
OT Works II	24	
FIGHT CLUB		
OT Works III	37	

== Filmography ==
=== Film ===
- Mahjong Horoki 2020 (2019), Doku
- Kappei (2022), Horita

=== Television ===
- Manpuku (2018), Charlie Tanaka
- Pokémon the Series: Sun & Moon (2019), Akitoshi (Ep. 115)
- You Can't Expense This! (2019), Kazuo Umagaki
- Isonoke no Hitobito - 20 nengo no Sazae-san (2019), Nakajima
- Boku wa Doko kara (2020), Shun
- MIU 404 (2020), Kameda (Ep. 3)
- DCU: Deep Crime Unit (2022), Nanao Morita
- Cap Kakumei Bottleman DX (2022), Tycoon Ochazaki
- What Will You Do, Ieyasu? (2023), Torii Suneemon
- Light of My Lion (2024), Yota Sadamoto
- The 19th Medical Chart (2025), Tetsuo Osu
- Last Samurai Standing (2025), Keage Jinroku
- Unbound (2025), Eishōsai Chōki
