= Let's Get Divorced =

2023 Japanese television series

- Promotional release poster

Japanese name
- Kanji: 離婚しようよ
Transcriptions
- Revised Hepburn: Rikon Shiyou Yo
- Genre: Drama
- Written by: Kankurō Kudō; Shizuka Oishi
- Directed by: Fuminori Kaneko; Ryosuke Fukuda; Takuya Sakaue
- Starring: Tori Matsuzaka; Riisa Naka
- Theme music composer: Shin Kono
- Composer: Yugo Kanno
- Country of origin: Japan
- Original language: Japanese
- No. of episodes: 9

Production
- Executive producers: Naomi Satoh; Shinichi Takahashi
- Producers: Aki Isoyama; Itsumi Katsuno
- Production location: Tokyo
- Cinematography: Akihiko Izawa; Masanobu Onishi
- Editor: Shigeki Matsuo
- Running time: 57–68 minutes
- Production company: TBS Sparkle

Original release
- Network: TBS Television; Netflix
- Release: June 22, 2023

Let's Get Divorced (Japanese: 離婚しようよ, Hepburn: Rikon Shiyou Yo) is a 2023 Japanese television series. Produced by TBS, and stars Tori Matsuzaka and Riisa Naka. The series premiered on Netflix on June 22, 2023.

== Cast ==
- Tori Matsuzaka as Taishi Shoji
- Riisa Naka as Yui Kurosawa
- Ryo Nishikido as Kyoji Kano
- Yuka Itaya as Kaoru Inden
- Lisa Oda
- Fūju Kamio
- Yusuke Shoji
- Shin Yazawa
- Rena Moriya
- Hiroyuki Takagishi
- Kou Maehara
- Toshinori Omi
- Narushi Ikeda
- Koji Yamamoto
- Reiko Takashima
- Keiko Takeshita
- Arata Furuta

== Production ==
In October 2021, The series was announced on Netflix as part of a three-series deal with TBS. The principal photography of the series started in March 2022 in Tokyo. The filming of the series wrapped up in July 2022.

== Reception ==
Joel Keller of Decider criticised the series. James Marsh of South China Morning Post gave it a rating of 2.5/5 and praised the series.
