= 64DD =

Video game peripheral

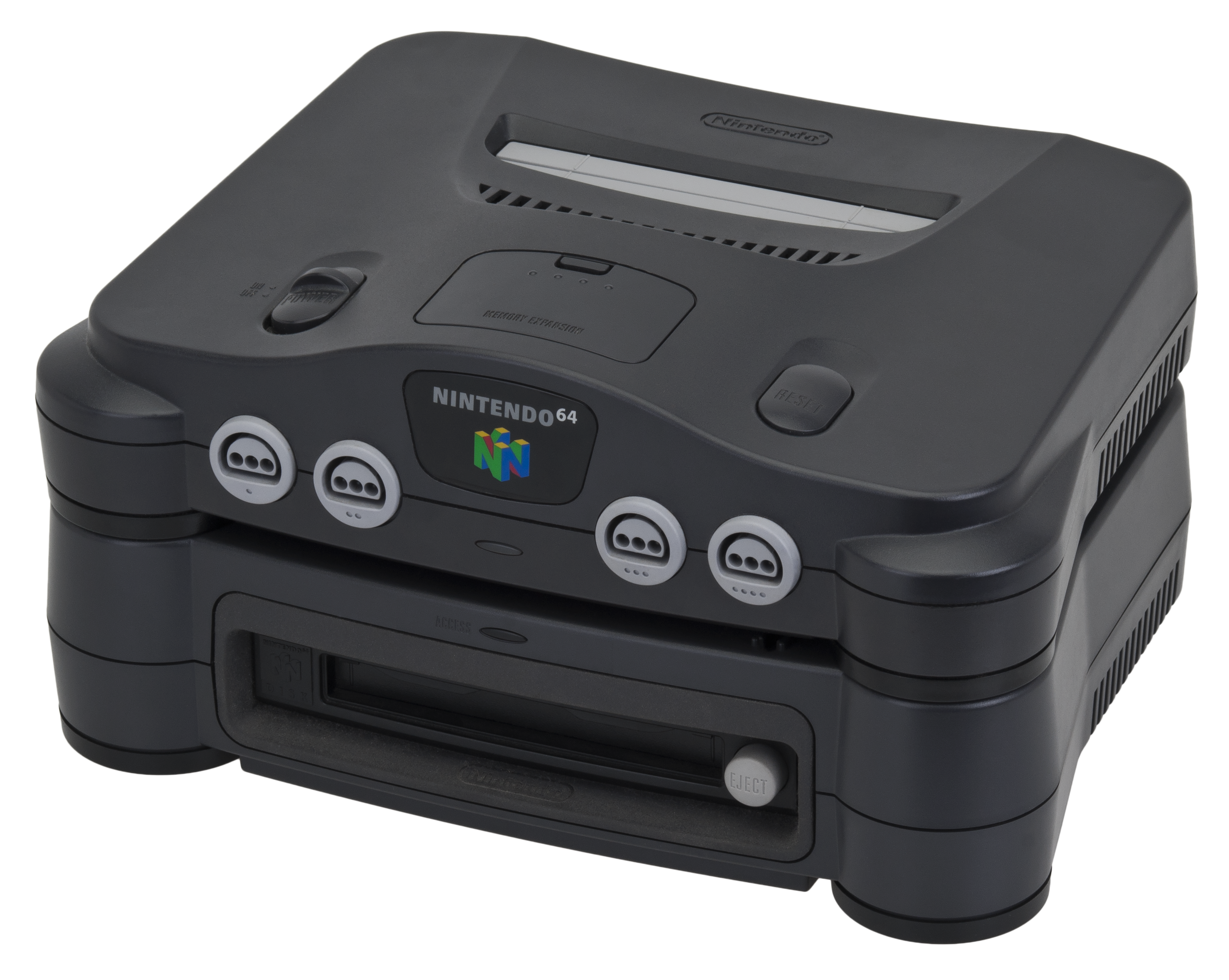
- A Nintendo 64 with the 64DD installed
- Also known as: NUS-010
- Developer: Nintendo, Alps Electric
- Manufacturer: Alps Electric
- Type: Video game console peripheral
- Generation: Fifth
- Released: JP: December 11, 1999
- Discontinued: JP: February 28, 2001
- Units sold: 15,000+
- Storage: 36 MB ROM (Note: Used for shared audio and font libraries)
- Removable storage: 64 MB magnetic disks
- Connectivity: 28.8 kbps dial-up modem
- Online services: Randnet
- Predecessor: Satellaview

The 64DD (Note: Japanese: ロクヨンディーディー, Hepburn: Rokuyondīdī; Nintendo branded the peripheral by its English name) is a peripheral developed by Nintendo to expand the capabilities of the Nintendo 64 with rewritable magnetic disks and online connectivity. Announced in 1995 before the Nintendo 64's 1996 launch, it faced multiple delays before its release in Japan on December 11, 1999. The "64" references both the Nintendo 64 console and the 64 MB storage capacity of the disks, while "DD" stands for "disk drive" or "dynamic drive". Despite its innovative features, it struggled to gain traction and was discontinued after a short-lived run in Japan.

Plugging into the extension port on the console's underside, the 64DD enabled expanded, rewritable data storage via proprietary 64 MB magnetic disks. It introduced a real-time clock for persistent game world elements and included a standardized font and audio library to optimize storage efficiency. Its games and hardware accessories allowed users to create movies, characters, and animations for use across various titles and shared online. The system could connect to the Internet via a dedicated online service, Randnet, which supported e-commerce, online gaming, and media sharing. Described as "the first writable bulk data storage device for a modern video game console", Nintendo envisioned the 64DD as an enabling technology for pioneering new game genres and applications, though many of these remained in development for years and never saw full realization.

By the time the 64DD was discontinued in February 2001, only ten software disks had been released, and Randnet had just 15,000 subscribers. A commercial failure, the peripheral was never released outside Japan. Many games originally planned for the 64DD were instead released as standard Nintendo 64 titles, ported to the more-powerful GameCube, or canceled altogether.

IGN lamented the device as "broken promises" and "vaporware", but described what was launched as "an appealing creativity package" for a niche audience, delivering both a "well-designed, user-driven experience" and a "limited online experiment." Ultimately, the 64DD only partially fulfilled Nintendo president Hiroshi Yamauchi's "longtime dream of a network that connects Nintendo consoles all across the nation."

== History ==
=== Development ===
With the 1993 announcement of its new Project Reality console, Nintendo explored options for data storage. A Nintendo spokesperson said in 1993 that "it could be a cartridge system, a CD system, or both, or something not ever used before." In 1994, Howard Lincoln, chairman of Nintendo of America said, "Right now, cartridges offer faster access time and more speed of movement and characters than CDs. So, we'll introduce our new hardware with cartridges. But eventually, these problems with CDs will be overcome. When that happens, you'll see Nintendo using CD as the software storage medium for our 64-bit system."

In consideration of the 64DD's actual launch price equivalent of about US$90, Nintendo software engineering manager Jim Merrick warned, "We're very sensitive to the cost of the console. We could get an eight-speed CD-ROM mechanism in the unit, but in the under-$200 console market, it would be hard to pull that off." Describing the final choice of proprietary floppy disks instead of CD-ROM, Nintendo game designer Shigesato Itoi explained, "CD holds a lot of data, DD holds a moderate amount of data and backs the data up, and [cartridge] ROMs hold the least data and process the fastest. By attaching a DD to the game console, we can drastically increase the number of possible genres."

The company also explored the forging of an early online strategy with Netscape, whose founding management had recently come directly from SGI, the company which had designed the core Nintendo 64 hardware. Within its budding online strategy, Nintendo reportedly considered multiplayer online gaming to be of the highest priority, even above that of web browsing. Several third party game developers were developing prominent online gaming features based on 64DD, including Ocean's Mission: Impossible deathmatches and Seta's competitive four-player Ultimate War and online racing games. Nintendo would ultimately retain the core impetus of these ideas, but would drastically alter both plans over the following years, in favor of a floppy-based storage technology and the Randnet online software and service partner—although with no online multiplayer gaming support whatsoever.

=== Announcement ===
It would have been easier to understand if the DD was already included when the N64 first came out. It's getting harder to explain after the fact. (laughs)

— Shigeru Miyamoto

Nintendo President Hiroshi Yamauchi announced the dual-storage strategy of the "bulky drive" at Nintendo's Shoshinkai 1995 trade show. He intended the product to be revealed at Shoshinkai 1996 and launched sometime in 1997, although giving virtually no technical specifications. Computer and Video Games reported unconfirmed specifications, far above what would be actually launched: 4" disk caddy, 150 MB floppy disks, 2.44 Mbit/s speed, 13 ms access, 2-4 MB RAM upgrade, and costing about ¥20,000 (US$200).

The 64DD was fully revealed at Nintendo's Shoshinkai 1996 show of November 22–24, 1996, where IGN reported that it was one of the biggest items of the show. There, Nintendo of America Chairman Howard Lincoln stated that the hardware specifications had been finalized and had its own show booth. Nintendo's Director of Corporate Communications, Perrin Kaplan, made the company's first official launch window announcement for the peripheral, scheduled for late 1997 in Japan. Core Magazine said, "Nintendo representatives insisted the system would be aggressively supported by third parties and Nintendo's internal development teams" with sequels for Super Mario 64 and Zelda 64, and 64DD originals Cabbage and Emperor of the Jungle. Nintendo's list of 64DD developers included Konami, Capcom, Enix, and Rare. Rare officially discounted any rumors of the peripheral's impending pre-release cancellation.

Reportedly, several developers attended the show to learn 64DD development, some having traveled from the US for the 64DD presentation and some having received 64DD development kits. A 64DD prototype was in a glass case, not visibly operational, but with a makeshift demonstration of Zelda 64 which was said to be running from disk. An improvised disk conversion of the familiar Super Mario 64 game demonstrated the drive's operation and performance, and a graphics application mapping the audience's photographical portraits onto live 3D animated avatars—a feature which was ultimately incorporated and released in 2000 as Mario Artist: Talent Studio and the Capture Cassette.

The event featured Creator, a music and animation game by Software Creations, the same UK company that had made Sound Tool for the Nintendo Ultra 64 development kit. They touted the game's ability to be integrated into other games, allowing a player to replace any such game's textures and possibly create new levels and characters. There was no playable version of Creator available there, but the project was later absorbed into Mario Artist: Paint Studio. Nintendo announced 64DD would be bundled with a RAM expansion cartridge.

Much of the gaming press said the 64DD reveal at Shoshinkai 1996 was not as significant as Nintendo had promised, leaving the public still unaware of the system's software lineup, practical capabilities, and release date. Zelda 64 (eventually released as the cartridge game The Legend of Zelda: Ocarina of Time) was seen as the 64DD's potential killer app in the months following the system's unveiling.

On April 3–4, 1997, Nintendo of America hosted a Developer's Conference in Seattle, Washington, where a surprise overview was delivered by Nintendo Developer Support staff Mark DeLoura about the 64DD.

=== Delays ===
The 64DD is notable in part for two years of many launch delays, which created an interdependent cascade of delays and complications of many other business processes and product launches for Nintendo and its partners, and the cancellation of Space World 1998 due to lack of completed 64DD software. IGN reported in June 1999 that many called it "the most elusive piece of vaporware to date".

On May 30, 1997, Nintendo issued a press conference announcing the first 64DD launch delay, rescheduled to March 1998 with no comment on an American release schedule. This was reportedly attributed to the protracted development of both the disks and the drive technologies. On June 9, 1997, Nintendo and Alps Electric announced their manufacturing partnership for the still tentatively titled 64DD.

We're hesitant to say [the status of the 64DD software lineup, but] if software doesn't come out consistently after we sell the 64DD, we'll be stuck.
Don't worry. Feel easy about the 64DD.

— Miyamoto, July 29, 1997

On June 18, 1997, at the E3 pre-show press conference, the company lacked even a prototype unit to display, while Howard Lincoln stated that the company wouldn't release the device until sufficient numbers of software releases support it. Reportedly featuring at least twenty games in development including Donkey Kong 64 and the sequel to Super Mario 64, the device retained its projected Japanese launch window of "at least" March 1998, and received its first American launch window of early 1998. Also at the show, Nintendo confirmed that the 64DD would have Internet capability, and Nintendo's main game designer, Shigeru Miyamoto, speculated that its launch games could be SimCity 64, Mario Artist, Pocket Monsters, and Mother 3.

At Space World from November 21–24, 1997, the 64DD was shown prominently but its delay was extended from March 1998 to June 1998, with no mention of an international launch. Next Generation magazine observed the attendees and the demonstrations, finding no appeal to the US market from any current 64DD software, which was mainly Mario Artist and Pocket Monsters. The magazine said "64DD's future does not look good. And whether or not it was ever a serious mainstream contender is now open for debate", and wondered if 64DD would become "just an interesting footnote to the Nintendo 64 story". The magazine, and Argonaut Software founder Jez San, found Nintendo's third-party relations, and the third-parties' products, to be poor with no sign of improving; San said "Rumors have been circulating for a while that recently within Nintendo the main priority has been [...] taking development staff off other games and projects [at the expense of Nintendo 64 and 64DD] to make sure that Pocket Monsters was done on time." Nintendo's presentation focused mainly on first party Nintendo 64 cartridges and the top selling game of 1997, Pocket Monsters for Game Boy. Zelda 64 had always been a killer app for the 64DD, but was now announced as lost to cartridge (Nintendo's largest ever, at 256 megabits or 32 megabytes) because Nintendo said the 64DD userbase probably couldn't support a blockbuster even if launched in June 1998 and because 64DD floppy disk speed cannot continuously stream 500 motion-captured character animations throughout gameplay as only a cartridge can.

George Harrison, vice president of Nintendo of America, described the logistics of the 64DD launch delays:

Certainly [64DD] hasn't been sidelined, it's still in the starting gate. [Nintendo can't guarantee that the 64DD will launch in the US in 1998], but what we can say is that it will launch when it is ready and when we have a compelling piece of software for it. But it's an accessory and we all know the history of selling add-ons in this marketplace, and to be successful we'd have to get a 60%-to-80% penetration of this 64DD into the installed base of N64 to be considered a success. We can't just have 10% or 20% of people buy it, otherwise it wouldn't make any sense to continue software support for it.

In a December 1997 interview with Shigeru Miyamoto and Shigesato Itoi, Miyamoto confessed the difficulty of repeatedly attempting to describe and justify the long-promised potential of the mysterious peripheral to a curious public. He said that it "would have been easier to understand if the DD was already included when the N64 first came out. It's getting harder to explain after the fact. (laughs)" To illustrate the fundamental significance of the 64DD to all game development at Nintendo, Itoi said, "I came up with a lot of ideas because of the 64DD. All things start with the 64DD. There are so many ideas I wouldn't have been allowed to come up with if we didn't have the 64DD." Miyamoto concluded, "Almost every new project for the N64 is based on the 64DD. ... we'll make the game on a cartridge first, then add the technology we've cultivated to finish it up as a full-out 64DD game." By 1998, IGN optimistically expected all major Nintendo 64 cartridge games to have software support for an impending expansion disk. Known third-party 64DD developers included Konami, Culture Brain, Seta, Japan System Supply, Titus, Infogrames, Rare, Paradigm Entertainment, Ocean, and Factor 5.

Despite NCL's confident announcements, we still suggest gamers looking to import the drive shouldn't hold their breath. Nintendo's 64DD delay track record still has a few openings for more entries.

— IGN, April 8, 1999

More delays were subsequently announced. The American launch was delayed to late 1998. The Japanese launch was delayed to June 1998, later adjusted by the apologetic announcement on April 3, 1998, that it would launch "within the year". The 64DD was conspicuously absent from E3 1998, having been briefly described the prior day as "definitely not" launching in 1998 and "questionable" in 1999, which Next Generation magazine interpreted as being "as close to 'dead' as we can imagine". IGN pessimistically explained that the peripheral's launch delays were so significant, and Nintendo's software library was so dependent upon the 64DD, that this lack of launchable software also caused Nintendo to entirely cancel Space World for 1998.

On April 8, 1999, IGN announced Nintendo's latest delayed launch date of 64DD and the nearly complete Mario Artist, as June 1999. Demonstrated at the May 1999 E3 as what IGN called an "almost forgotten visitor", there was no longer a plan for release outside Japan, and its launch in Japan was still withheld by the lack of completed launch games. In June 1999, IGN reported that month's completion of Randnet and the modem, as having "breathed new life into what many have called the most elusive piece of vaporware to date". IGN said Nintendo "is surprisingly confident about the 64DD and is predicting to sell the full initial shipment of 500,000 before year's end".

As of Space World 1999 in August, Nintendo had set Randnet's launch date at December 1, 1999, but reportedly had not yet set a launch date for the 64DD. The 64DD pre-order program had been recently announced for mid-September, and was now delayed to November or December. Earthbound 64, which IGN cynically called "in development for nearly 1,000 years", had been heavily anticipated inside the company and globally as a crucial 64DD launch game, but the sudden announcement of its release being retargeted from disk to 32 megabyte cartridge plus expansion disk was interpreted by IGN as unsurprising and as a sign of possible further delay or cancellation of the 64DD. Nintendo's 64DD booth demonstrated eight launch games, including DT Bloodmasters, which used the 64 GB Cable to connect a Game Boy Color to the 64DD. Nintendo listed many more 64DD games in development. Randnet had recently been announced and was being tested in Japan.

=== Launch ===
The 64DD was launched on December 13, 1999, exclusively in Japan, as a package called the Randnet Starter Kit including six games bimonthly through the mail, and one year of Internet service. Core Magazine and IGN reported Nintendo's stated initial retail shipment of 500,000 units.

Anticipating that its long-planned peripheral would become a commercial failure, Nintendo initially sold the Randnet Starter Kit via mail order. Later, very limited quantities of the individual 64DD and games were released to stores.

=== Discontinuation ===
On August 25, 2000, Space World was signified by the launches of the GameCube and Game Boy Advance, and by what IGN considered to be the unofficial discontinuation of the 64DD, jokingly calling it "DeaDD". According to IGN, "Nintendo did not speak about 64DD during its opening speech, nor did the hardware itself have any booth presence. In fact, the unofficial 'No 64DD!' policy seemed to be enforced by Nintendo so brutally that had we even muttered the name of the hardware, we would have probably been tossed out of the show."

In October 2000, Nintendo announced the impending discontinuation of the 64DD and Randnet, with 15,000 active subscribers. They were discontinued in February 2001. Only ten 64DD disks were ever released, including three third-party games and one Internet application suite. Most planned 64DD games were either released on increasingly larger Nintendo 64 Game Pak, ported to other consoles like the PlayStation or GameCube, or canceled entirely.

== Hardware ==
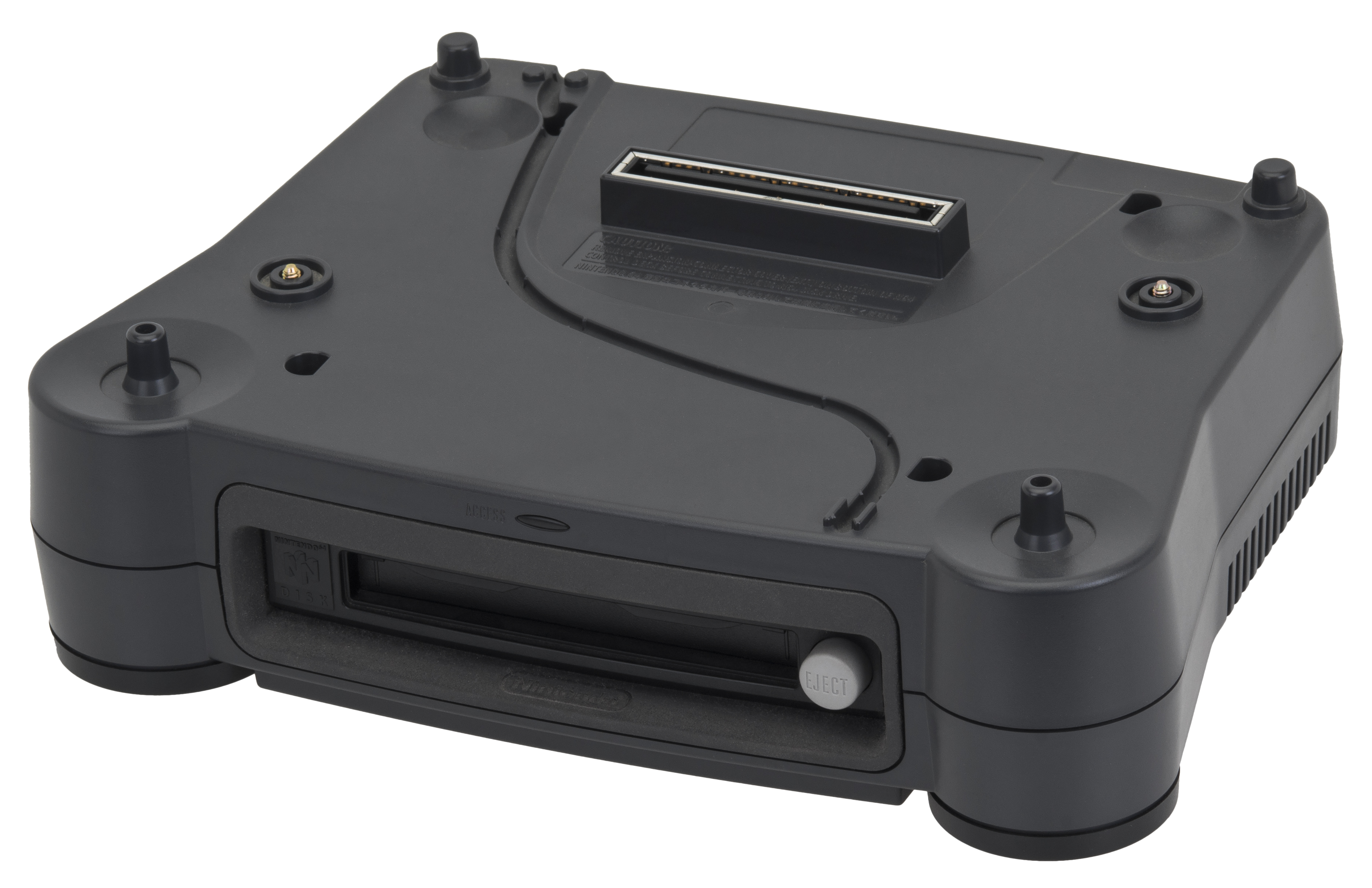
The 64DD, unattached

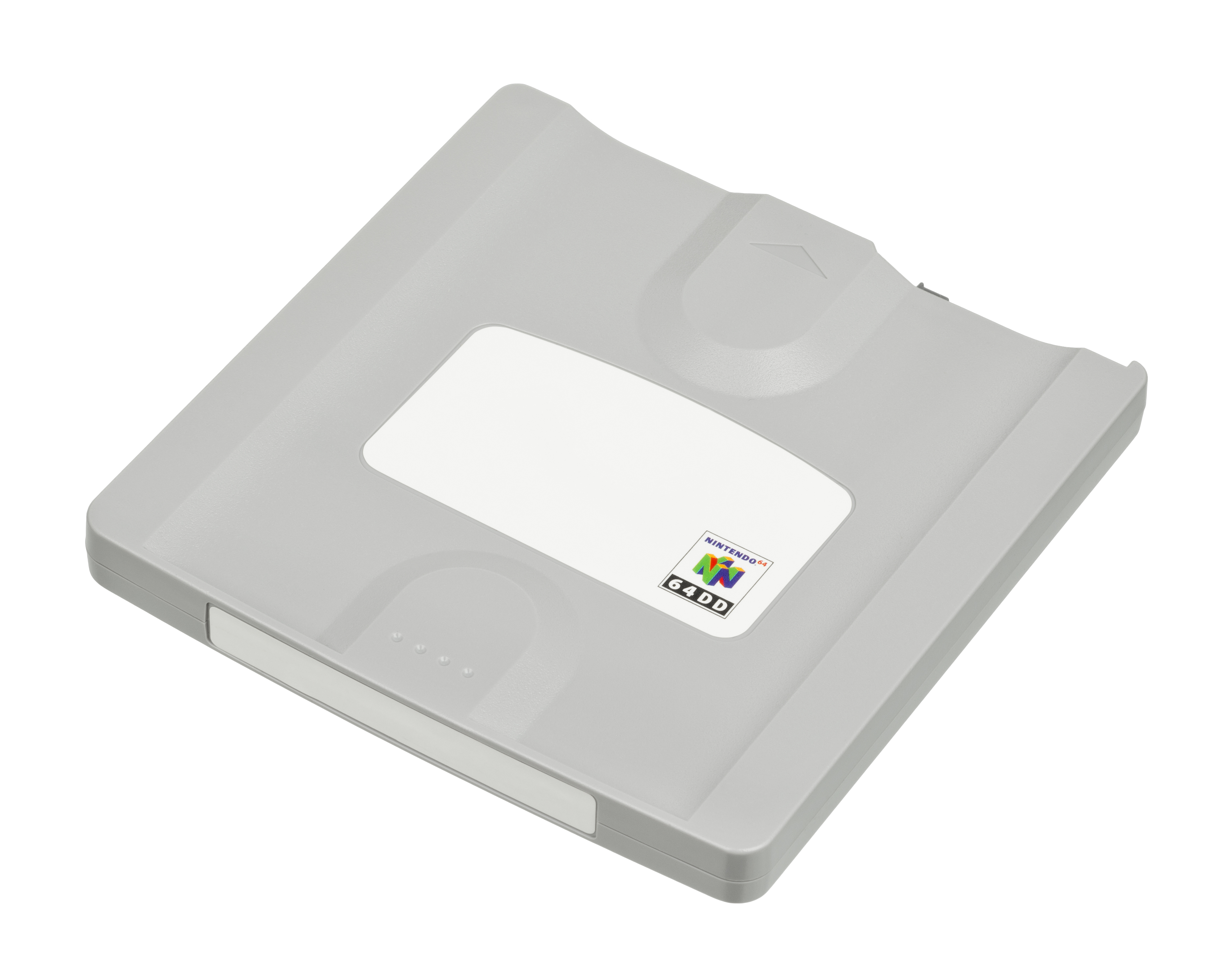
64DD disk, top

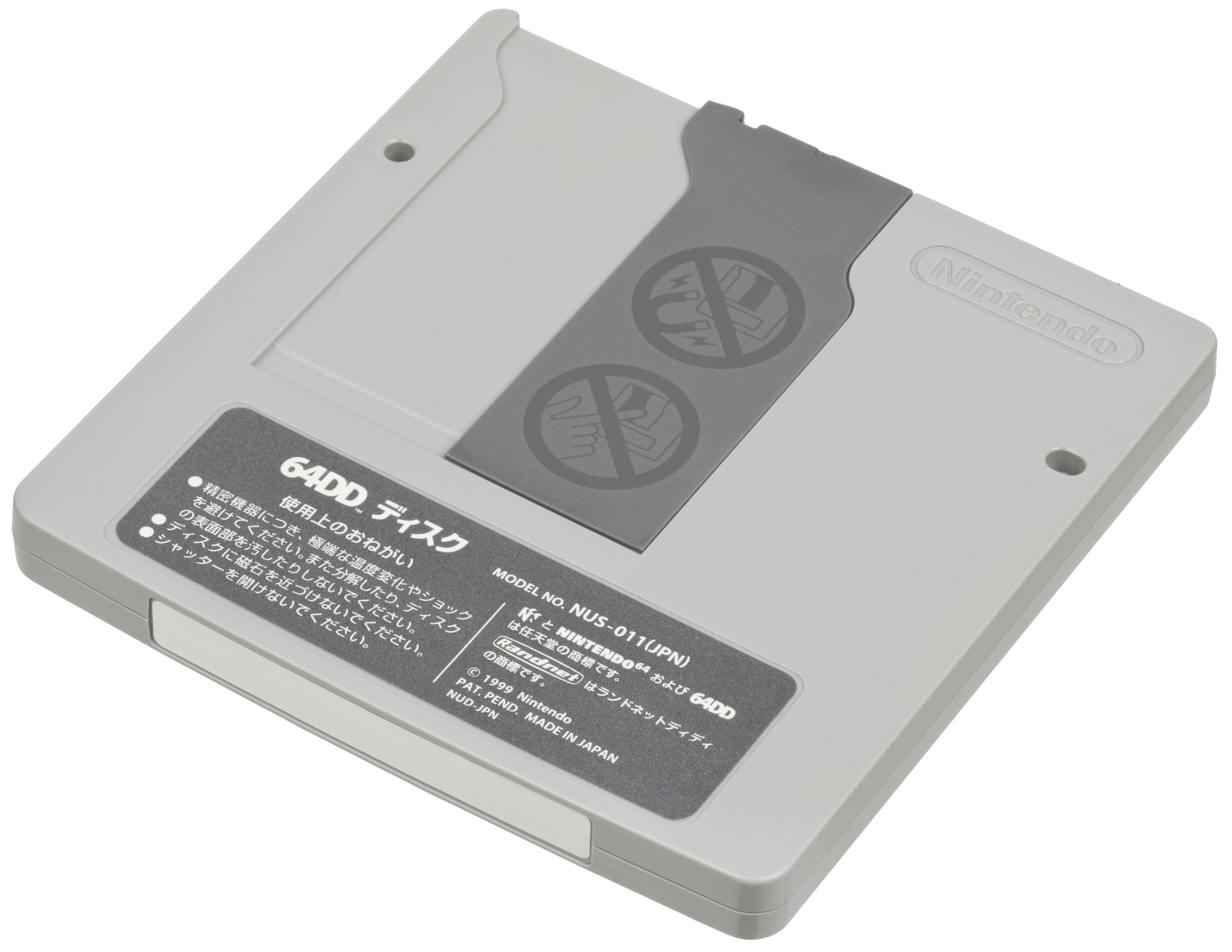
64DD disk, bottom

Nintendo designed the 64DD as an enabling technology to support the development of new game genres, achieved primarily through three features: a dual storage strategy using both cartridges and disks, an integrated real-time clock (RTC), and Internet connectivity via the Randnet service.

The 64DD's dual storage approach complemented the Nintendo 64's fast but expensive cartridges with less-expensive rewritable magnetic disks that offered higher capacity and lower cost, though with slower performance. The proprietary 64DD disks, resembling durable Zip disk-style floppy disks, provide 64 MB of storage with a peak transfer rate of 1 MB/s and an average seek time of 75 ms. Unlike the CD media used by the competing PlayStation and Sega Saturn, the 64DD format was both writable and offered better protection against unauthorized copying. While CD-ROMs of the era could store over 650 MB they only had a 300 kB/s read speed and high latency, contributing to stuttering and to very long loading times.

The 64DD was designed in part to expand the storage capabilities of the Nintendo 64. During its development, Nintendo planned for The Legend of Zelda: Ocarina of Time to use the 64DD exclusively, but ultimately released it on cartridge to take advantage of faster performance while reserving optional expansions for the disk.

Similar in concept to the Famicom Disk System's relation to early Famicom cartridges, the 64DD was conceived at a time when 4 MB cartridges were standard. While cartridge sizes increased to 8 MB with Super Mario 64 and later to 32 MB and 64 MB, only three games were ever released on 64 MB cartridges. In contrast, the 64DD disks allowed up to 38 MB of writable space, enabling support for new game genres and features such as user-generated content and episodic expansions.

The 64DD's RTC enabled persistent world mechanics by keeping track of time even when the system was powered off. For example, Shigeru Miyamoto cited the RTC as a key reason for developing the cancelled pet simulation game Cabbage for the 64DD: "We're doing it on the 64DD because I wanted to make a clock function, such that even if the power is cut, [you] can still raise the creature."

The 64DD also had a built-in font and audio library, saving space on disks, and a 32-bit coprocessor dedicated to disk operations. This offloaded data handling from the Nintendo 64's main Reality Coprocessor and CPU. Like most disc-based consoles, the 64DD has a boot menu to operate without a cartridge.

=== Accessories ===
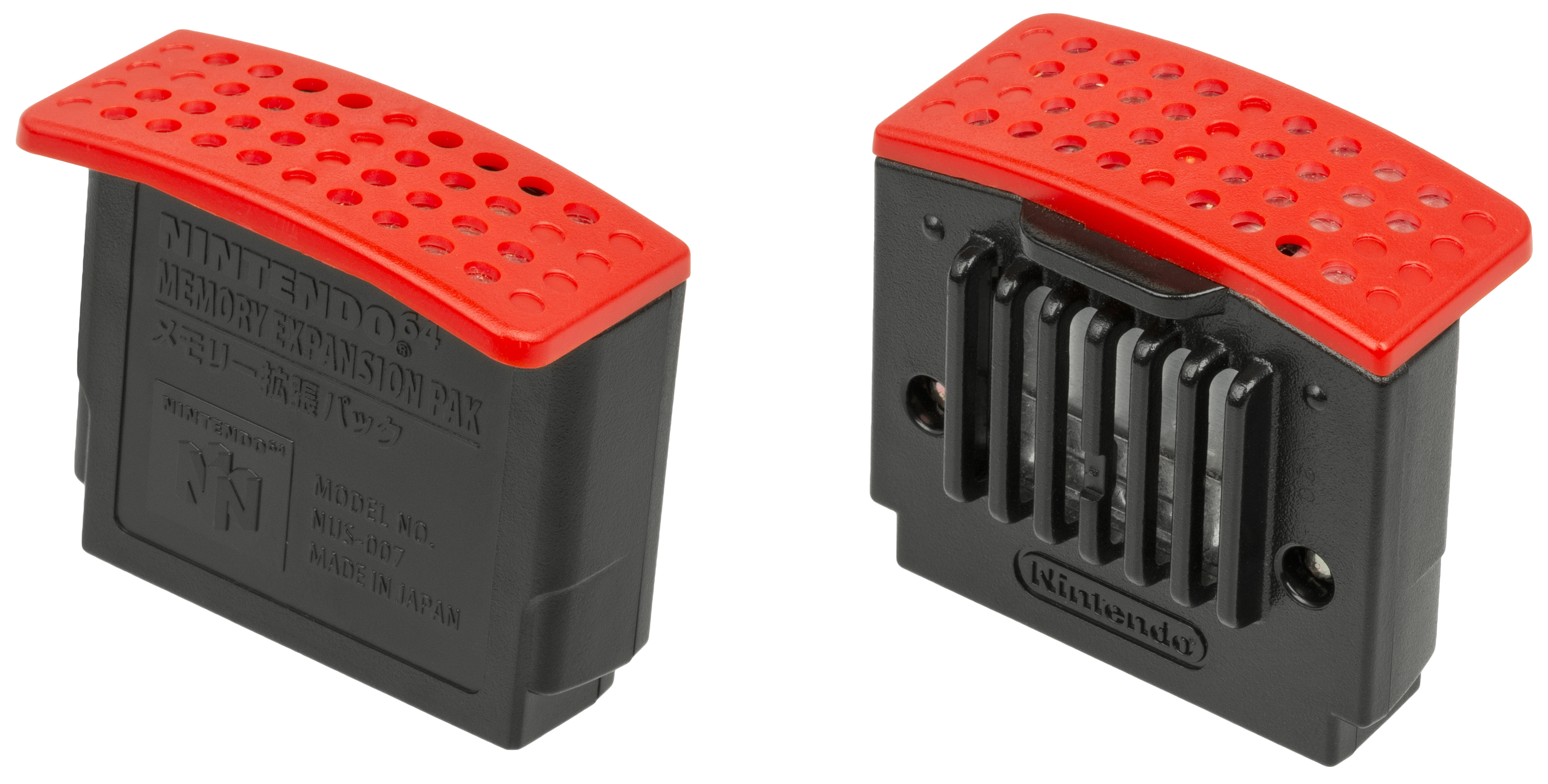
The requisite 4 MB RAM Expansion Pak is bundled with the 64DD.

All versions of the 64DD system were bundled with the 4 MB Expansion Pak, which increased the Nintendo 64's RAM to 8 MB.

A Randnet Starter Kit was also offered, which included the 64DD drive, Expansion Pak, modem cartridge, Randnet Browser Disk, and a modular phone cable for connecting to the online Randnet service.

Mario Artist: Paint Studio was bundled with the Nintendo 64 Mouse, while Mario Artist: Talent Studio included an audio-video capture cartridge with composite RCA inputs and a 3.5 mm jack, used in conjunction with an included microphone.

== Randnet ==
Recruit and Nintendo Co., Ltd. has [sic] established a joint venture "RandnetDD Co., Ltd." which provides a membership network service through Nintendo 64 and its newly released peripheral device, 64DD in Japan. The joint venture offers several network-based services: web browsing; e-mail services; and publication of digital newspapers and magazines.

— Recruit web site, June 30, 1999

In April 1999, Nintendo ended its partnership with St.GIGA, which had provided the Satellaview online service for the Super Famicom in Japan from 1995 to 2000. Nintendo then partnered with the Japanese media company Recruit to develop a new proprietary online platform for the 64DD called Randnet, a portmanteau of "Recruit and Nintendo network." The two companies established a joint venture named RandnetDD Co., Ltd., announced on June 30, 1999.

Randnet operated exclusively in Japan from December 13, 1999, until February 28, 2001. It provided Internet access through a members-only portal and allowed users to share content such as artwork. The subscription included a dial-up Internet account, 64DD hardware, and a schedule of game disk deliveries by mail. Multiplayer online gaming was initially considered more important than web browsing functionality.

The system connected via a CPU-powered 28.8 kbps software modem, developed with Nexus Telocation Systems, Ltd. and Surf Communications. Housed in a cartridge with a modular cable port, this modem was the only officially licensed Internet connectivity product for the Nintendo 64. Although there had been discussions to integrate a modem directly into the console, this did not come to fruition.

The Randnet Starter Kit included the 64DD drive, the Nintendo 64 modem, and the Randnet Browser Disk. The browser provided access to a members-only page and several online features: an editing tool for creating custom avatars, message boards and email, communication with game developers, Internet browsing optimized for TVs, and limited postcard creation through Mario Artist. Randnet also included e-commerce through GET Mall, which sold CDs, books, and 64DD software, as well as a digital magazine service, although only horse racing results were ultimately implemented.

Nintendo originally promoted several features that were later canceled. These included downloadable Famicom games via an emulator, online battle modes for titles such as Mah-jongg, DT Bloodmasters, Ultimate War, and Wall Street, ghost data observation, beta test downloads, and music distribution.

Initial registration for Randnet was open from November 11, 1999, to January 11, 2000, limited to 100,000 users. The service could only be accessed with both a Nintendo 64 and 64DD system, and the hardware was not sold at retail but made available by mail order through participating convenience stores and game retailers. Game disks were delivered monthly after the hardware was shipped.

Two plans were offered: one for users who already owned a Nintendo 64 and another lease-to-own option that included a translucent black console. Monthly payment plans were priced at ¥2,500 (approximately US$23.50) for the base plan and ¥3,300 (US$31) for the lease-to-own option, with Randnet service costing ¥1,500 (US$14) per month afterward. Users also paid dial-up access fees of up to ¥20 per minute. Initially available only in Tokyo, the subscription model was eventually replaced with annual prepaid plans costing ¥30,000 (US$290) for purchase and ¥39,600 (US$380) for lease-to-own. The 64DD and later software titles eventually became available for direct retail purchase.

As part of the subscription, games were delivered in stages: Doshin the Giant and Mario Artist: Paint Studio in December 1999, followed by Randnet Disk, SimCity 64, and Mario Artist: Talent Studio in February 2000, and F-Zero X Expansion Kit and Mario Artist: Polygon Studio in April 2000.

== Games ==
=== Released ===
A total of ten disks were released for the 64DD, which comprise six games, two expansions, and two dial-up utility disks.

Title	Release date
Mario Artist: Paint Studio (マリオアーティスト ペイントスタジオ)	December 11, 1999
Doshin the Giant (巨人のドシン1, Kyojin no Doshin 1)	December 11, 1999
Randnet Disk (ランドネットディスク)	February 23, 2000
Mario Artist: Talent Studio (マリオアーティスト タレントスタジオ)	February 23, 2000
SimCity 64 (シムシティー64)	February 23, 2000
F-Zero X Expansion Kit (エフゼロ エックス エクスパンション キット)	April 21, 2000
Japan Pro Golf Tour 64 (日本プロゴルフツアー64, Nippon Puro Gorufu Tsua 64)	May 2, 2000
Doshin the Giant: Tinkling Toddler Liberation Front! Assemble! (巨人のドシン解放戦線 チビッコチッコ大集合, Kyojin no Doshin Kaihō Sensen Chibikko Chikko Daishūgō)	May 17, 2000
Mario Artist: Communication Kit (マリオアーティスト コミュニケーションキット)	June 29, 2000
Mario Artist: Polygon Studio (マリオアーティスト ポリゴンスタジオ)	August 29, 2000

=== Proposed ===
Several games that were announced for the 64DD were, due to the system's delays and commercial failure, either released on Nintendo 64 cartridge format only, completely canceled, or otherwise ported to another console, such as Nintendo GameCube, Sony PlayStation, Sega Dreamcast, or Nintendo Game Boy Advance.

- 7th Legion (canceled)
- Asylum (canceled)
- Automobili Lamborghini Add-on (canceled)
- Cabbage (canceled; later influenced Nintendogs and others)
- Communication Game (canceled; online game by the development team of PostPet)
- Creator (later integrated into Mario Artist: Paint Studio)
- DD Sequencer (canceled)
- Derby Stallion 64 (released on cartridge)
- Desert Island: No Man's Island (canceled)
- Dezaemon 3D Expansion Kit (canceled)
- Diablo (canceled)
- Digital Horse Racing Newspaper (canceled)
- Digital Sports Newspaper (canceled)
- Dōbutsu Banchō (previewed on cartridge in 2000, later released as Cubivore: Survival of the Fittest on GameCube)
- Dōbutsu no Mori (released on cartridge in Japan, and later as Animal Crossing on GameCube)
- Dragon Quest VII (released on PlayStation)
- DT Bloodmasters (canceled)
- Fire Emblem 64 (canceled; plot elements later used in Fire Emblem: Fūin no Tsurugi for GBA)
- Fushigi no Dungeon: Fūrai no Shiren 2 (released on cartridge)
- Game Maker (canceled)
- Gendai Daisenryaku: Ultimate War (converted to cartridge in 2000, then canceled)
- Graphical Message Maker (canceled)
- Ide Yosuke no Mahjong Juku (released on cartridge)
- Kirby 64 (released on cartridge as Kirby 64: The Crystal Shards)
- Mario Artist: Sound Maker (split from Paint Studio, then canceled)
- Mario Party 2 (released on cartridge)
- Mario no Photopi (cartridge released without 64DD storage option)
- Mission: Impossible (released on cartridge)
- Mother 3 (converted to cartridge with expansion disk in 1999, canceled in 2000, then redeveloped and released for GBA in Japan)
- Mother 3.5 (Mother 3 expansion)
- Namco RPG
- New Japan Pro-Wrestling: Toukon Road Brave Spirits Add-on (canceled)
- Ogre Battle Saga (released on cartridge as Ogre Battle 64: Person of Lordly Caliber)
- Oriental Blue: Ao no Tengai (canceled, then redeveloped and released for GBA in Japan)
- Pokémon Snap (released on cartridge)
- Pocket Monsters Stadium (released on cartridge)
- Pokémon Stadium (released on cartridge)
- Project Cairo (canceled)
- Rev Limit (canceled)
- Seaman (released on Dreamcast)
- Shogi (canceled)
- SimCopter 64 (canceled)
- Snow Speeder (released on cartridge)
- Street Fighter III (canceled)
- Super Mario 64 2 (canceled)
- Super Mario RPG 2 or Super Mario Adventure (released on cartridge as Paper Mario)
- Suul (canceled)
- Teo (canceled)
- Tonic Trouble expansion (canceled)
- Unreal (canceled)
- Untitled Capcom game (canceled)
- Ura Zelda (initially canceled, then released on GameCube as Master Quest)
- Video Jockey Maker (canceled)
- Wall Street (canceled)
- Yoshi's Island 64 (released on cartridge as Yoshi's Story)
- Zelda 64 (released on cartridge as The Legend of Zelda: Ocarina of Time)
- Zelda Gaiden (released on cartridge as The Legend of Zelda: Majora's Mask)

== Reception ==
Rating the overall system at 6.0 out of 10.0, IGN's Peer Schneider finds the industrial design language of the 64DD and its accessories to perfectly match and integrate with that of the Nintendo 64, with no user-accessible moving parts, a single mechanical eject button, sharing the N64's power button, and child-friendly usability. Installation is said to be "quick and painless", operation is "even simpler", and the whole system "couldn't be easier to use". Software load times are described as "minimal", where the most complex possible point of the system's library reaches about five seconds. The site says that the 64DD popularity was inherently limited, due in part to its limited release in Japan, a country which had a limited adoption of the Nintendo 64 and of dialup Internet connectivity.

Schneider found the combination of the Randnet's web browser and the mouse to provide a "passable surfing experience". He described the portal's private content as "much too limited", where "[a]nyone who has used the Internet would snicker at the lack of up-to-date contents or tools offered on Randnet". He was disappointed in the companies' failure to have ever delivered certain promised online features, such as game beta testing and music distribution. But it provides new users with a "simple network [which] functions as first baby steps into the vast world of the Internet".

Schneider liked the overall product value provided by the Randnet Starter Kit, including hardware, games, accessories, and Internet subscription. However, the platform's abrupt discontinuation proved to limit the appeal to a per item basis rather than as a whole. Because these items were sold only as a soon-discontinued bundle, all with such ultimately limited application, he found the disks' cheaper prices to be aggregated back up to the level of cartridges.

He found the Mario Artist series (especially the 64DD's "killer app", Talent Studio) to be uniquely compelling in creative ways that "couldn't be done on any other gaming console on the market", utilizing the disks' writability and "[leaving] CD systems behind". As a flagship 64DD game, IGN found Paint Studio's well-made art creation functionality to be both a low-cost paint program, and edutainment akin to an Adobe Photoshop for kids. Knowing Nintendo's stated plans, he supposed that if the platform hadn't been abruptly canceled, Nintendo would have utilized Paint Studio as a source of user-generated art content for a substantial library of customizable games. IGN also called Wall Street a 64DD killer app, though canceled.

Schneider acknowledges Nintendo's vision, attributing the system's downfall generally upon the drastically changing marketplace during the several years of delays. He summarized the 64DD as "an appealing creativity package" "targeted at a certain type of user" "that delivered a well-designed user-driven experience"—and a "limited online experiment at the same time", which partially fulfilled Nintendo president Hiroshi Yamauchi's "longtime dream of a network that connects Nintendo consoles all across the nation".

Core Magazine honored the 64DD: "In Japanese culture, there is a concept known as mono no aware. While this term completely defies English translation, one of its connotations is that there is nobility in things that soon perish."

Nintendo reported 15,000 active Randnet subscribers as of the October 2000 announcement of the service's impending closure, implying the sale of at least as many requisite 64DD units.

=== Legacy ===
All things start with the 64DD. —Itoi

Don't worry.
Feel easy about the 64DD. —Miyamoto

New genres of games were developed due to the advent of 64DD's rewritable mass storage, real-time clock (RTC), and Internet appliance functionality. However, the system's commercial failure required many 64DD games to be released on traditional Nintendo 64 cartridges alone, ported to other consoles, or canceled.

Some of these standalone Nintendo 64 cartridge releases include the equivalent of the 64DD's RTC chip directly on board the cartridge, as with Japan's Animal Forest. The 4 MB RAM Expansion Pak became a sometimes mandatory staple of Nintendo 64 game development, being packaged along with a few cartridge games. All subsequent Nintendo consoles would directly include RTC functionality.

The concept of the popular multiplatform Animal Crossing series originated with the 64DD's rewritable storage and RTC. The eventual initial release of the series was adapted to utilize only the Nintendo 64 cartridge format with an embedded RTC, in the form of Japan's Animal Forest. That game was cosmetically adapted for GameCube (with the console's built-in RTC and its removable and rewritable memory cards) with the new name of Animal Crossing. All games in the series are played in real time persistent game world, with the passage of time being recorded on writable media. The realtime effect reflects real seasons, real holidays, virtual plant growth, development of virtual relationships, and other events. Interactivity between real human players on different subsequent console generations has been enabled through the swapping of various Nintendo consoles' writable mass storage cards or through online communications.

The legacy of what is now the Nintendogs series originated because of 64DD, in the form of a pet creature breeding prototype called Cabbage. Never released, it had been codeveloped by Shigesato Itoi (designer of EarthBound), Tsunekazu Ishihara (designer of Pokémon), and Shigeru Miyamoto. Its publicized four-year development was fundamentally enabled by the real-time clock and mass writability, where Miyamoto explained, "We're doing it on the 64DD because I wanted to make a clock function, such that even if the power is cut, [the game] can still raise the creature" and with optionally purchasable enhancement data. A subset of creature maintenance functionality is made portable on the Game Boy via the Transfer Pak, to be synchronized back to the 64DD disk. In 2006, Miyamoto concluded that "the conversations and design techniques that popped up when we were making Cabbage are, of course, connected to Nintendogs and other things that we're doing now."

The concept of a personal avatar creator app which had begun with prototypes for the Famicom was solidified in Mario Artist: Talent Studio and then has been seen on all subsequent Nintendo consoles. Those Talent Studio avatars can be imported into select 64DD games including the SimCity 64 game. Nintendo designer Yamashita Takayuki credits his work on Talent Studio as having been foundational to his conception and development of the entire Mii component of the Wii platform a decade later. The game's concepts were reportedly specifically foundational to the characters in Wii Tennis.

The concept of graphical stamps that are seen in various Miiverse-supported games is found in Mario Artist: Paint Studio and Mario Paint.

The user-creation of graphics, animations, levels, and minigames which are in the Mario Artist series and F-Zero X Expansion Kit are revisited in later console generations. The idea of minigames was popularized generally during the Nintendo 64's fifth generation of video game consoles. Some early minigames can actually be created in Mario Artist: Polygon Studio in the style that would later be used in the WarioWare series of games. Certain minigames directly originated there, as explained by Goro Abe of Nintendo R&D1's so-called Wario Ware All-Star Team: "In Polygon Studio you could create 3D models and animate them in the game, but there was also a side game included inside. In this game, you would have to play short games that came one after another. This is where the idea for Wario Ware came from."

In 2018, historian Chris Kohler said that as one of Nintendo's "oddest" products, the 64DD is "now a sought-after collectible and a unique piece of the company's long, long history of bold experimentation".

== See also ==
- Family Computer Network System
- Famicom Disk System
- Sega CD – a similar peripheral for the Sega Genesis
- Satellaview
