= SimCity 64 =

2000 video game

- Box art
- Developer: HAL Laboratory
- Publisher: Nintendo
- Series: SimCity
- Platform: Nintendo 64DD
- Release: JP: February 23, 2000
- Genre: City-building simulation
- Mode: Single-player

SimCity 64 (Note: SimCity 64 (シムシティー64, shimushitī-rokuyon)) is a city-building video game developed by HAL Laboratory and published by Nintendo for the Nintendo 64DD. The game and its peripheral were released only in Japan.

== Gameplay ==
Top: Standard, Hide & Seek.; Bottom: Train, Helicopter, views

SimCity 64 may have been intended as a sequel to Nintendo's Super Nintendo Entertainment System (SNES) release of the original 1991 SimCity, given several elements from the SNES version are found in SimCity 64, including Dr. Wright (named after Will Wright), the city's advisor. Although general gameplay in SimCity 64 is much like SimCity 2000, the game's graphical textures and building tilesets are considerably different and also, the game eliminates the water buildings and pipes only leaving the power plants and power lines. However, the game sports several advanced features that were not seen in SimCity 2000 or even SimCity 3000: The ability to view the city at night (this became available in SimCity 4), pedestrian level free-roaming of a city, and individual road vehicles and pedestrians (which could only be seen while in the free-roaming mode). Cities in the game are also presented in 3D hybrid graphics. Custom graphics can also be imported from Mario Artist: Paint Studio. The 64DD incarnation of the game SimCopter was intended to read data from SimCity 64, allowing the player to fly over their game's city in a helicopter. SimCopter was ultimately cancelled, and this feature was instead integrated directly into SimCity 64.

== Development ==
SimCity 64 was developed by HAL Laboratory and published by Nintendo. Word that it was being developed leaked to the press in mid-1997. Producer Shigeru Miyamoto was involved in editing the game. SimCity 64 was originally intended to be released as a launch game for the peripheral. After numerous delays of the 64DD, SimCity 64 was made playable at Nintendo Space World in 1999. The game is considerably obscure, given its Japan-only release and designation to run on the ill-fated 64DD platform.

== Reception ==
The four reviewers of the Japanese magazine Famitsu awarded SimCity 64 scores of 8, 8, 8 and 7 for a total of 31 out of 40 points. IGN gave the game a 6 out of 10.
