= Derby Stallion 64 =

2001 video game

- Developer: Parity Bit
- Publisher: Media Factory
- Producer: Hiroyuki Sonobe
- Series: Derby Stallion
- Platform: Nintendo 64
- Release: JP: August 10, 2001
- Genre: Simulation
- Modes: Single-player, multiplayer

Derby Stallion 64 (Note: Japanese: ダービースタリオン64, Hepburn: Dābīsutarion 64) is a 2001 simulation game for the Nintendo 64. In the game players work in sport of horse racing by owning, breeding, training and betting on race horses.

The game was initially in developed for the 64DD, an add-on device for the Nintendo 64. It was described its first public presentation as a "long-waited debut" by IGN when it was presented at the Nintendo Space World event in August 2000. The game was released on August 10, 2001, in Japan. It received positive reviews in the video game magazine Famitsu and was their highest overall rated game of the year for the Nintendo 64.

== Gameplay ==
In Derby Stallion 64, the player takes place in the sport of horse racing and involves players owning, breeding, training and racing horses. Up to four players can store data a Nintendo 64 Game Pak which allows them to race their horses against other players.

As a simulation game, the players do not control the horses they are racing, but hope they can choose a better bred horse than their friend. The game features racehorse data based on performances in horse racing in 2000 and uses jockeys under their real names.

== Development and release ==
The game was initially planned to use the 64 GB Cable to integrate the Game Boy Color and the 64DD. The game would have players gamble privately through their handheld device to bet on the right horse. The cable was never released, and the 64DD version of Derby Stallion was scaled back in favor of a regular release for the Nintendo 64.

IGN described Derby Stallion 64 as opted for a more realistic design for their horses than other horse racing games for the Nintendo 64.

Derby Stallion 64 made what IGN described as its "long-waited debut" at Nintendo Space World in August 2000. It was shown briefly on a jumbotron display at Nintendo's event stage and was scheduled to be released before the end of the year. IGN reported in 2001 that the game was estimated at being 72.5% completed and was set for release in Japan in the first quarter of 2001 with no scheduled American release date. Derby Stallion 64 was released on August 10, 2001. While initially announced as the final official game for the Nintendo 64 in Japan by IGN, the system also received the game Bomberman 64 on December 20, 2001.

== Reception ==
Reception

Review score
Publication	Score
Famitsu	9/10, 9/10, 8/10, 7/10

In an early preview from IGN, they complimented the look of the game as being more realistic than the more "kiddy" look of derby racing games developed by Konami for the system.

In Famitsu, four reviewers ranked the game on a ten-point scale. Three of the reviewers commented that the game had applied new gameplay mechanics which meant old strategies that worked in earlier entries in the Derby Stallion series would no longer apply. While one reviewer said this was a positive element to the game, two others said it would create more trial and error for fans of the series to breed a prestige racing horse. One reviewer said that visuals were not good at all and felt there was too much loading times, especially for a cart-based game. Another reviewer followed up that there were other horse racing games with superior or equal graphics to Derby Stallion 64, but none that were on the level of its overall quality.

It was the highest rated of the five Nintendo 64 games reviewed by Famitsu in 2000. Along with Dōbutsu no Mori (2001) for the system, it was one of the two 2001 games for the system which earned the "Gold Hall of Fame" ranking, reserved for games that averaged a critical score between 32 and 34 points.

== See also ==
- Horse racing in Japan
- List of Nintendo 64 games
- Video games in Japan
