= Cabbage (video game) =

Canceled video game

- Developer(s): Nintendo EAD
- Publisher(s): Nintendo
- Designer(s): Shigesato Itoi; Tsunekazu Ishihara; Shigeru Miyamoto; Satoru Iwata
- Platform(s): Nintendo 64/64DD
- Genre(s): Breeding simulator

Cabbage (Note: キャベツ, Kyabetsu) was a canceled breeding simulator video game that was planned for release in the late 1990s on the 64DD, an expansion peripheral for the Nintendo 64 console. The prototype was developed by a team of Nintendo's "biggest talents", led by Shigesato Itoi (Mother series), Tsunekazu Ishihara (Pokémon series), Shigeru Miyamoto (Mario, Zelda, and more), and eventually Satoru Iwata. Miyamoto spoke eagerly about the innovative development of Cabbage across the years until early 2000. Years later, he reflected that it had drifted silently into cancellation but that it deeply influenced other Nintendo games such as Animal Crossing and Nintendogs.

== Development ==
Cabbage was announced in 1997 as a game in which the player was able to raise, feed, and carry around a creature called a Cabbage. Shigeru Miyamoto stated at the time that the game had been in development for five years. Cabbage had been the working title of the game, though it appeared to be "strangely popular" with the staff. It was something Itoi "randomly blurted out" at some point during development, but he was fine with sticking to it, as there weren't any other names on the board. Kotaku noted the odd name, describing it as "sound[ing] like something a kid would normally avoid".

The game would make use of the 64DD's internal real-time clock, a hardware feature then unique to video game consoles, to keep the Cabbage creature and its virtual world seeming to run while the console is turned off. Furthermore, the game was supposed to allow Game Boy connectivity via the Nintendo 64 controller's Transfer Pak, to which the creature could be transferred in an interactive carrying basket game, and then released into the virtual environment of other 64DD-equipped consoles. Finally, there were plans to release expansion content on cheap 64DD floppy disks, which would alter the game and the Cabbage's development by giving it toys, "swings, slides, ponds, and so on". The team proposed the ability to use rewritable 64DD floppy disks to swap the creature's toys between different players. Miyamoto described these features at Nintendo's Space World 1997 trade show. These ideas might have been a response to the "virtual pet craze" at the time and have been compared to Tamagotchi. Miyamoto only ever described the game verbally, withholding any real Cabbage graphics from the press, vaguely blaming the declining and uncertain video game market in Japan.

In a 1997 interview with 64Dream, Itoi stated that HAL Laboratory's Satoru Iwata joined the project. Itoi said that because of this, "the tools [they're] using to make Cabbage are drastically modernizing. Making those tools is the most laborious part. So it looks like that part's finishing up." Furthermore, Itoi said that they were working on the project without supervision of Nintendo's president Hiroshi Yamauchi.

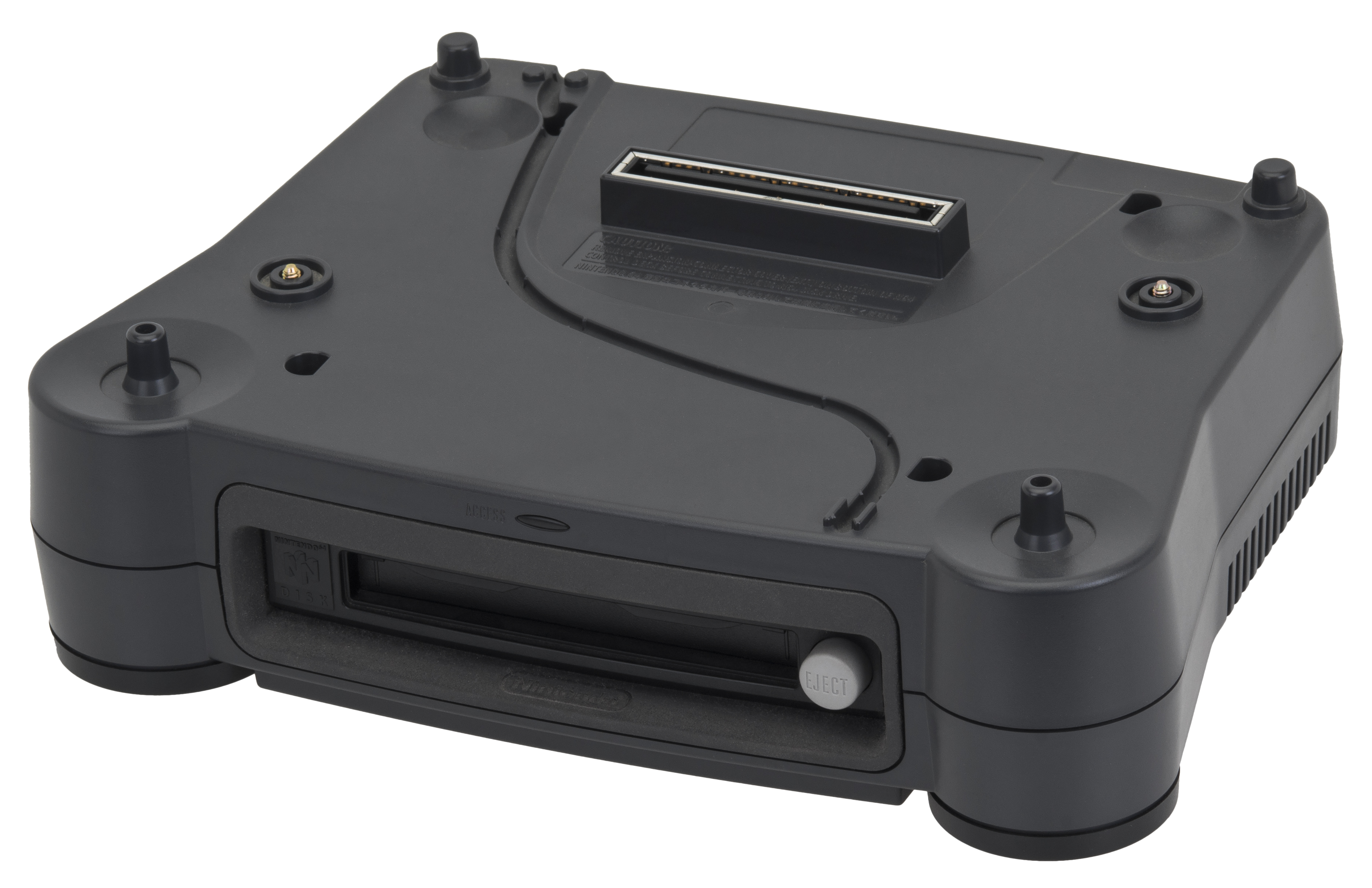
The 64DD was a commercial failure shortly after its release in December 1999.

In 2000, Itoi gave an update on Cabbage, noting that, as Miyamoto was looking forward to the game, he'd "like to get something done relatively soon". It was planned to be playable at Space World 2000, but no demo ever surfaced. No video or screenshot of the game was ever revealed, because according to Miyamoto, Itoi and Ishihara got occupied with other projects. Itoi was working on Mother 3, which was being developed for the 64DD at the time, and Ishihara oversaw projects at The Pokémon Company, which he started in 1998. Around this time, it also became apparent that the requisite 64DD was a commercial failure.

IGN speculated that Sega's experimental creature raising game Seaman, released in 1999 for Dreamcast, may have influenced Nintendo's plans for Cabbage.

== Legacy ==
Miyamoto has stated in a 2006 interview that, though Cabbage news had stopped for so long that he considered it canceled, "the conversations and design techniques that popped up when [we] were making Cabbage are, of course, connected to Nintendogs and other things that [we're] doing now." Kotaku and 1Up.com have noted that many gameplay concepts and elements in Animal Crossing had been first announced as features in Cabbage.
