= General-purpose technology =

Technologies that can affect an entire economy at large scale

General-purpose technologies (GPTs) are a product, process or organisational system that can affect an economy at a national or global level. These technologies have the potential to drastically alter societies through their impact on pre-existing economic and social structures. Examples of GPTs include the airplane, automobile, artificial intelligence, biotechnology, bronze, computer, domestication, electricity, factory system, internal combustion engine, Internet, iron, mass production, money, nanotechnology, printing press, railways, steamboat, steam engine and the wheel.

In economics, it is theorized that initial adoption of a new GPT within an economy may, before improving productivity, actually decrease it due to time required for development of new infrastructure, learning costs and, obsolescence of old technologies and skills. This can lead to a "productivity J-curve" as unmeasured intangible assets are built up and then harvested. The impending timeframe to utilize the latent benefits of the new technology is deemed a trade-off. Spin-out firms/inventors from organizations that had developed GPTs play an important role in developing applications. However, it has been observed that the level of cumulative innovation in GPTs diminishes as more spin-outs into application development occur.

== Historical GPT ==
Economists Richard Lipsey and Kenneth Carlaw classified 24 technologies in history as true GPTs. They define a transforming GPT according to the four criteria listed below:

1. is a single, recognisable generic technology
2. initially has much scope for improvement but comes to be widely used across the economy
3. has many different uses
4. creates many spillover effects

Since their book, more GPTs have been added for the 21st century.

=== Foundational ===
The earliest technologies mentioned by Lipsey and Carlaw occur before the Neolithic period and have not been cast as GPTs, however, they are innovations that the other 24 rely upon.

	Classification	Date
Spoken language	process	Pre-10,000 BC
Clothing	product	Pre-10,000 BC
Mastery of fire	process	Pre-10,000 BC
Coil pottery	product	Pre-10,000 BC
Weapons (sharp-edged tools)	product	Pre-10,000 BC

=== Expanded list of 26 technologies ===
GPT	Spillover Effects	Date	Classification
Domestication of plants	Neolithic agricultural revolution	9000-8000 BC	process
Domestication of animals	Neolithic agricultural revolution, working animals	8500-7500 BC	process
Smelting of ore	early metal tools	8000-7000 BC	process
Money	trade, record keeping	9000–6000 BC	process
Wheel	mechanization, potter's wheel	4000–3000 BC	product
Writing	trade, record keeping, poetry	3400-3200 BC	process
Bronze	tools and weapons	2800 BC	product
Iron	tools and weapons	1200 BC	product
Water wheel	inanimate power, mechanical systems	Early Middle Ages	product
Three-masted sailing ship	discovery of the New World, maritime trade, colonialism	15th century	product
Printing	knowledge economy, science education, financial credit	16th century	process
Factory system	Industrial Revolution, interchangeable parts	late 18th century	organisation
Steam engine	Industrial Revolution, machine tools	late 18th century	product
Railways	suburbs, commuting, flexible location of factories	mid 19th century	product
Iron steamship	global agricultural trade, international tourism, dreadnought battleship	mid 19th century	product
Internal combustion engine	automobile, airplane, oil industry, mobile warfare	late 19th century	product
Electricity	centralized power generation, factory electrification, telegraphic communication	late 19th century	product
Automobile	suburbs, commuting, shopping centres, long-distance domestic tourism	20th century	product
Airplane	international tourism, international sports leagues, mobile warfare	20th century	product
Mass production	consumerism, growth of US economy, industrial warfare	20th century	organisation
Computer	Digital Revolution, Internet	20th century	product
Lean production	Growth of Japanese economy, agile software development	20th century	organisation
Internet	electronic business, crowdsourcing, social networking, information warfare	20th century	product
Biotechnology	genetically modified food, bioengineering, gene therapy	20th century	process
Nanotechnology	nanomaterials, nanomedicine, quantum dot solar cell, targeted cancer therapy	21st century	product
Artificial intelligence	automation of tasks, predictive analytics, scientific discovery acceleration, recommender systems, autonomous robots, data processing & decision support systems, generative content creation	21st century	process

Steam engine increased labor productivity annually by 0.34%; IT by 0.6% (1995–2005); robotics by 0.36% (1993–2007).

== Military and defense-related procurement ==
In his book, Is War Necessary for Economic Growth?: Military Procurement and Technology Development, Vernon W. Ruttan examined the impact of military and defense-related procurement on U.S. technology development. Ruttan identifies the development of six general-purpose technologies:

- Interchangeable parts and mass production
- Military and commercial aircraft
- Nuclear energy
- Computers and semi-conductors
- Internet
- Space industries

Ruttan contended that the current technological landscape would look very different in the absence of military and defense-related contributions to commercial technology development. However, from his research, he determined that commercial technology development would have occurred in the absence of military procurement. He cited nuclear power as an example of a general-purpose technology that would not have developed.

== See also ==
- Dual-use technology
- Enabling technology
