= PostPet =

Hybrid virtual pet/email client software

- Developers: So-net; PetWorks
- Release: November 1997; 28 years ago
- Operating system: Classic Mac OS; Windows
- Available in: Japanese; English; Chinese
- Type: Virtual pet; email client
- License: Proprietary
- Website: https://www.so-net.ne.jp/postpet

PostPet (ポストペット, Posutopetto), commonly abbreviated as Posupe (ポスペ) in Japanese, is a hybrid virtual pet and email client software developed by PetWorks and So-net and first released in Japan in November 1997. The software is designed for computer novices. It takes place in a virtual room, allowing the user's pet to send and receive email messages. Multiple versions of the software have been released over the years, and the franchise has received adaptations into other forms of media, such as an anime series and multiple video games.

The software was successful and well-received for its appeal to new computer users, especially children and young women, with over 100,000 copies sold in less than a year. On the other hand, critics and journalists have noted that it is not well-suited for professional use.

== Overview ==
PostPet takes place in a virtual room, which can be decorated to the user's liking using plug-in software, where the user's pet resides. When a user receives an email message from another user of PostPet, their pets interact with each other on-screen as the message is exchanged. When a reply is sent, the user's pet temporarily disappears in order to deliver the message. Pets start out inexperienced at deliveries and may find themselves going on detours. They will also write messages to the owners from the delivery destination, updating them on what's happening, and sometimes for no reason at all but to chat. They may even send messages out to other addresses of their own accord, often about their owner, and will keep a personal diary.

Users can feed their pets a variety of treats, though they do not die if they are not fed. At the end of a pet's lifespan, they leave, and the user is able to adopt a new pet. The user can pet or hit their pet using their mouse cursor, which invokes a positive or negative response respectively. Pets become dirty while delivering mail and require baths to be cleaned. Pets' mood depends on their success in delivering mail, and they cannot deliver mail if not properly cared for. PostPet 2001 introduced the ability to give your pet toys, to which they have unique reactions. An online community service with gameplay elements was also offered to users of the software, called PostPet Park, available with a subscription. The service offered downloads for new toys and snacks, among other features.

== Development ==
Development of PostPet began in 1996. It was created by Kazuhiko Hachiya and intended to be an easy-to-use and fun email client for novice computer users. Kazuhiko says that he was inspired by messenger pigeons and traditional mail when developing PostPet, as well as a dream he had about a teddy bear delivering letters from his girlfriend.

It officially released in November 1997, and would later be released in English and Chinese language versions. Support for Windows CE came in June 1999, with a dedicated CE device, the Pocket PostPet, following in April 2000. An IBM ViaVoice compatible version released on September 10, 1999. The software came pre-installed on some computers around this time, including Sony's Vaio line and Apple's iMac. An updated version of the software, PostPet 2001, released in December 1998, and a third iteration, PostPet V3, released on December 4, 2002. Pets from previous versions of PostPet could be transferred to the new versions.

== Characters ==
Group photo of the characters in PostPet V3

The original version of PostPet features four different characters to choose from, while PostPet 2001 and PostPet V3 added four and two more respectively, bringing the total of options the user can select from up to ten. These characters are mostly simple, low poly 3D animals, with a few exceptions. In addition to the selectable characters, mail received from people who do not use PostPet will be delivered by a robotic mailman.

=== Original version ===
Momo (モモ)

A pink teddy bear, portrayed as a small child between the ages of 3 and 10 years old. They use childish speech patterns and struggle to express themselves, often saying "..." instead when they can't find the right words. They are the representative character for the software and are also used as a mascot for So-net, appearing in commercials for the company. They were also once used on Sony Bank's website as a virtual accountant. Their official profile describes them as laid back but a little stupid. In 2013, they were appointed as the official representative mascot of the Pink Ribbon Festival event, run by the Japan Cancer Society.

Furo (フロ)

A purple mixed-breed cat, portrayed as a young adult between the ages of 15 and 20. They are prone to running away and can be bossy. They write emails to the user often but are quick to disappear. They have a temperamental personality and need quite a bit of attention.

Sumiko (スミコ)

A long-lived tortoise, portrayed as an adult between the ages of 20 and 92. They use the most advanced language of any character and tend to write long letters. Their official profile describes them as being patient but withdrawn. They have also been described as "argumentative but ironic" and a writer of interesting emails.

Mippi (ミッピ)

A yellow rabbit, portrayed as a child between the ages of 4 and 14. They are somewhat lonely, a bit scatter-brained, and always seem to seek attention from the user. They have a keen eye for treasures, often finding them during deliveries.

=== PostPet 2001 ===
John (ジョン)

A brown dog, portrayed as a young adult between the ages of 14 and 20. They enjoy going for walks. They like to make people laugh and have a strong sense of duty. They were named after a real life dog owned by Kazuhiko Hachiya's parents.

Ushe (ウシェ)

A penguin-possum hybrid. They are portrayed as an adult between the ages of 18 and 30 and like to read. They have a "cool" personality and carry mail in a pouch on their stomach. The developers chose their name to sound Singaporean, as a Singaporean version was being planned for release during PostPet 2001's development.

Jinpatchi (じんぱち)

A hamster with a big mouth, portrayed as an adolescent between the ages of 10 and 14. They deliver mail quickly but sometimes forget to send messages due to their sleepiness. The male and female versions have different personalities. They run away much less often than the other pets but spend a lot of time sleeping. They have the shortest lifespan overall. They are named after the pet hamster of Michio Kitamura, one of the developers.

Shingo (シンゴ)

A mecha with a mind of its own, able to operate even when unplugged. It is usually shaped like a computer, but can transform. It enjoys listening to music and is vulnerable to damage from water. It is portrayed as a teenager around 14 years old. It is named after the manga My Name Is Shingo. In PostPet V3, it transforms into Shingo R.

=== PostPet V3 ===
Komomo (コモモ)

A smaller pink teddy bear, portrayed as a teenager between the ages of 12 and 18. They are described in their official profile as cute, clever, and sharp-tongued, as well as being selfish. They want to become the new face of the brand in place of Momo.

Takechiyo (竹千代)

A younger version of the robot postman character who delivers mail, portrayed as a young teenager between the ages of 12 and 15. They write emails that contain a lot of naive statements and tend to nitpick what the user writes.

== Cultural impact ==
PostPet was highly successful, selling over 100,000 copies in less than a year. The software was particularly popular with children and young women, though Kazuhiko says that the program's userbase was more evenly split between genders and primarily consists of adults. Various forms of merchandise have been made based on the characters, including stuffed toys and figurines. In the 2000s, Momo was a popular character in Japan for mobile phone charms.

A spin-off version intended specifically for children, PostPet Kids, was released in 2000, featuring menus in hiragana and more simplified text. In 2001, Taito opened a PostPet-themed prize corner at their Shibuya store, named PostPet Fun Factory. A mobile version launched for J-Phone cellphones in 2003, which could communicate with the PC version. A webmail service, Webmail de PostPet, was launched in 2005 and lasted until 2013. In 2010, a Twitter client named PostPetNow, that would allow the user to exchange DMs with their pet, was being developed, but it ultimately never released due to API changes.

A crowdfunding campaign on Campfire for a virtual reality project was launched in 2016 to celebrate the 20th anniversary of the software, which would be held as an event in August and September of 2018. A messaging app for smartphones, PostPet Go, was announced to be in development in 2020 with an unset release date.

== Reception ==
Reception of PostPet has primarily been positive. Internet Watch says that the software is good for those who are new to using email, and Yuko Hasegawa writes in Leonardo that the software's use of cute pet characters "makes us more resistant to the stress brought on by computer problems". Lisa Baggerman says that PostPet "makes receiving email both fun and friendly for new users".

On the other hand, reporters expressed that the software is of little use in a professional setting. Newsweek's Kay Itoi says that the software is "slow and lacks the versatility of more serious mailers", pointing out its lack of common features such as the ability to have multiple mailboxes or to send email to multiple addresses at once. AERA's staff calls the pets' tendency to forget to send mail cute but an inconvenience. Baggerman writes that "messages delivered by an adorable, playful pet" are unlikely to please a CEO but goes on to note that general use wasn't the intended purpose of PostPet.

=== Awards ===
Year	Award	Category	Result	Ref.
1997	Multimedia Grand Prix '97	Minister of International Trade and Industry Award	Won	
1997	Association of Media in Digital Awards	Excellence Award	Won	
1998	Prix Ars Electronica	.net Distinction	Won	
1998	Association of Media in Digital Awards	Best Visual Designer Award (Networking)	Won	
1998	Association of Media in Digital Awards	Excellence Award	Won	
1998	Good Design Award	Good Design Award	Won	

== Spin-off media ==
=== PostPet Momobin ===
PostPet Momobin (ポストペットモモ便) is a CGI anime series that aired on TBS Television from 2004 to 2005.

=== Video games ===
==== PostPet Gameland ====
PostPet Gameland was an internet-based game for Windows and Macintosh computers, released in 2000. A monthly fee was required in order to play. Minigames could be played using medals, which could be earned through in-game jobs.

==== PostPet Paradise ====
PostPet Paradise was a RPG-like sugoroku game for I-mode mobile devices, released on May 26, 2008. A Yahoo! Mobile version released in July.

==== PostPet DS ====
PostPet DS: Yumemiru Momo to Fushigi no Pen (PostPet DS 夢見るモモと不思議のペン) released for the Nintendo DS handheld on December 24, 2009. The game takes place on "PostPet Island", where the player is the only human resident. It received a positive review from 4Gamer, where it was described as cute and relaxing.
