= Mario no Photopi =

1998 video game

- Developers: Datt Japan, Inc. (Note: Additional development work by Nintendo Co., Ltd., Tokyo Electron, and Fuji Photo Film Co.)
- Publishers: Tokyo Electron Device (publisher); Hagiwara Syscom Co., Ltd. (distributor)
- Series: Mario
- Platform: Nintendo 64
- Release: JP: December 2, 1998
- Genre: Creativity
- Mode: Single player

Mario no Photopi (Note: Japanese: マリオのふぉとぴー, Hepburn: Mario no Fotopī) is an image editing video game developed by Nintendo, Tokyo Electron, Fuji Photo Film, Datt Japan, and Hagiwara Syscom for the Nintendo 64. It was published by Tokyo Electron Device and distributed by Hagiwara Syscom exclusively in Japan on December 2, 1998. The cartridge uniquely features two SmartMedia memory card slots, to import digital camera photos.

The game is primarily a photo retouching tool with gamified elements. The player can decorate imported images with Mario-themed clip art, borders, and fonts to create slideshows, postcards, and other printable assets. It was originally marketed as an alternative to expensive personal computers, utilizing the Nintendo 64 and its planned 64DD floppy drive as a high-capacity home media station. Vice retrospectively compared it to Photoshop and Mario Paint.

Because the cartridge requires a SmartMedia card to function, Mario no Photopi was historically difficult to emulate and became a rare collector's item. In 2017, a hobbyist released an unofficial patch to run the game "cardless" on emulators.

== Gameplay ==
Mario no Photopi is a gamified image editing tool, encouraging user-generated content. The cartridge features two slots on top for SmartMedia memory cards to be inserted, allowing the import of any Exif image saved to the memory card by other compatible devices such as digital cameras. Most of the game's features will not function unless it detects a card.

Once imported, these images can be retouched using the included Mario series clip art, borders, fonts, and other graphics to create new compositions. The composition's layout can become a postcard, name card, poster, or slideshow. A minigame generates a playable tile-flipping puzzle based on the composition. Completed compositions can be exported to the memory card, allowing them to be imported to a personal computer or Fuji printing kiosk such as at a shopping mall.

== Development ==
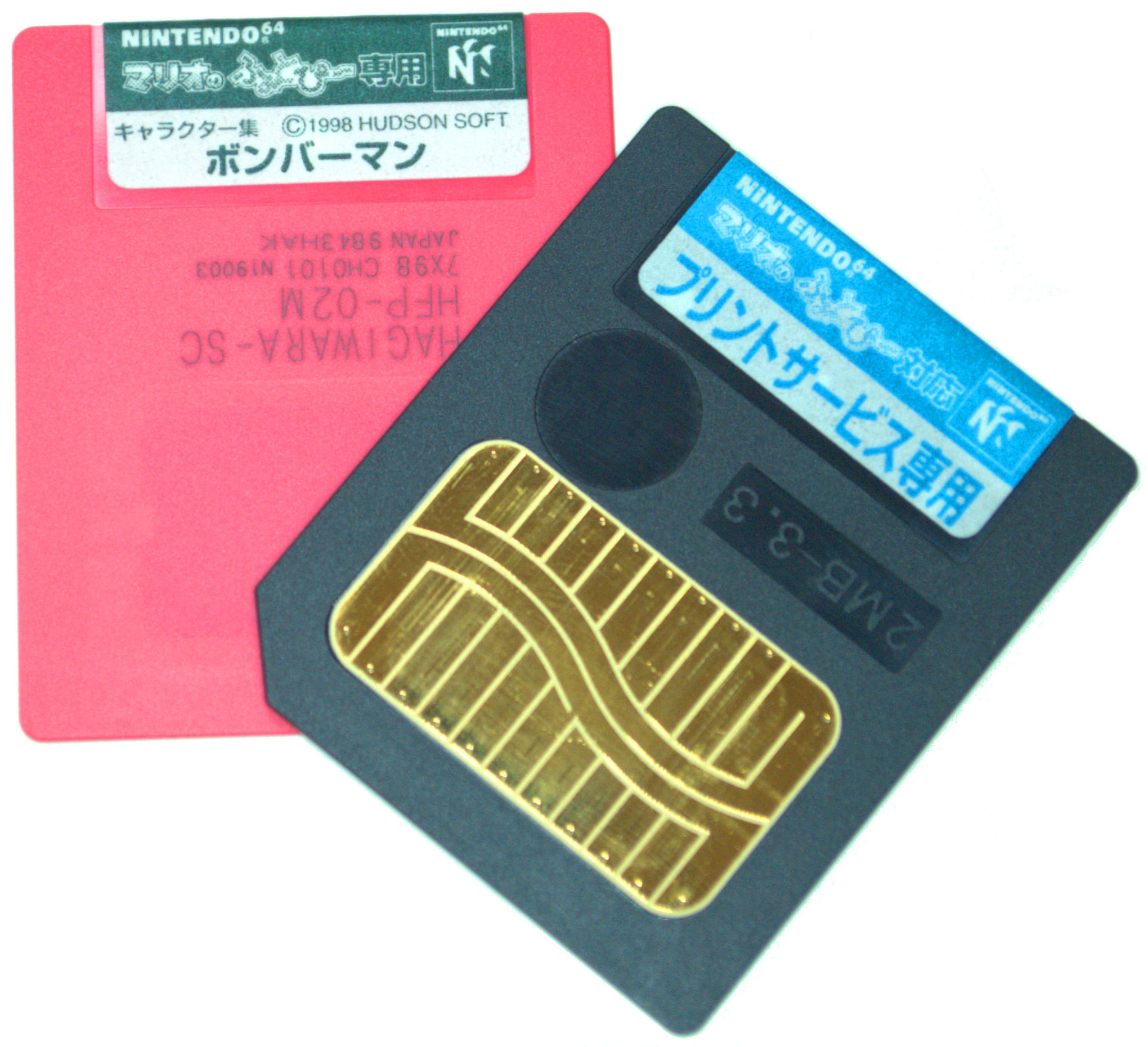
SmartMedia cards store photos and clip art for the game.

During the 1990s, the adoption of personal computers (pasukon) in Japanese households was hindered by the high cost, a lack of robust Japanese language support, and the limited physical space of typical residences. Purikura (originally "Print Club") is a Japanese arcade phenomenon since the mid-1990s where users decorate photo stickers, later called the foundation of the modern selfie. Mario no Photopi was developed in 1997 to supplant the pasukon.

Development was a joint effort supervised by Nintendo, which contributed some character graphics; the software developer Datt Japan, which created the game application; the memory manufacturer and distributor Hagiwara Syscom; the publisher Tokyo Electron Device, which integrated the SmartMedia slot into Nintendo's Game Pak cartridge design; and printer maker Fuji Photo Film Co., Ltd.

On December 2, 1997, Mario no Photopi was preannounced with optional compatibility with the upcoming and long awaited 64DD floppy drive, which was expected to launch in March 1998. Compared to a SmartMedia card's then-typical 2 MB, the 64 MB floppy disk was intended to hold a user's entire photo album and therefore further supplant Japan's market demand for a much more expensive personal computer and printer. The 64DD's drastic launch delays forced the removal of all 64DD functionality from the game. From September 30 to October 3, 1998, the game was publicly demonstrated at Hagiwara Syscom's booth at World PC Expo '98.

== Release ==
The game was released on December 2, 1998, with a suggested price of ¥9,800, and packaged with a blank SmartMedia card. As a nonstandard cartridge uniquely containing the only SmartMedia interface for the Nintendo 64, the cartridge has a model number of NUS-023.

Ten optional SmartMedia cards were produced separately and specifically for the game, preloaded with graphics files. These include two "Illustration" cards (labeled "Postal cards" and "Funny accessories") containing generic clip art graphics, and eight "Characters Collection" cards featuring images from different properties: Bomberman, Cardcaptor Sakura, Hello Kitty, Himitsu no Akko-chan, The Legend of Zelda: Ocarina of Time, Medarot, Sylvanian Families, and Yoshi's Story.

== Reception and legacy ==
At the World PC Expo '98 prerelease demonstration, Kumio Yamada of PC Watch expressed mistrust of the product's file format in favor of an open standard like JPEG. He praised the convenience of the gamepad driven user interface for image slideshows and management, and he especially enjoyed editing custom photos with Nintendo's characters.

Vice retrospectively called the game "one part Photoshop, one part Mario Paint". Its rarity reportedly makes it "a piece of Nintendo lore" and "something of a holy grail among collectors". Mario no Photopi is so obscure even compared to 64DD releases (including Mario Artist: Paint Studio's loosely estimated 7,500 sales), that SVG said "sales figures are impossible to find".

In 2017, a hobbyist released the "Cardless Hack", an unofficial patch that removes the requirement for a SmartMedia card to be present, allowing the game to be played through emulators.

== See also ==
- Mario Artist, a 64DD series of Internet-enabled art games where Mario Artist: Polygon Studio (2000) is a 3D modeler that allowed online mail order of custom papercraft prints
- Game Boy Camera
- Pokémon Snap (1999), another cartridge conversion from the delayed 64DD, where a retail kiosk printed images from the cartridge
