= Japan Pro Golf Tour 64 =

2000 video game

- Developer(s): Media Factory
- Publisher(s): Media Factory
- Platform(s): 64DD
- Release: JP: May 2, 2000
- Genre(s): Sports
- Mode(s): Single-player

Japan Pro Golf Tour 64 (Note: Japanese: 日本プロゴルフツアー64, Hepburn: Nihon Puro Gorufu Tsuā 64 Rokuyon) is a 2000 sports video game developed and published by Media Factory for the 64DD, a magnetic disk peripheral for the Nintendo 64.

== Gameplay ==
The player about to swing the ball

Japan Pro Golf Tour 64 is a golf-simulation video game with 18 holes. It also features the ability to customize the player character.

== Development and release ==
Japan Pro Golf Tour 64's late release has made the game a prized collector's item. It is the 64DD's rarest and most sought-after released game. Original copies typically demand high prices on various online auction sites and used game stores, even having exceeded as much as $7000.

== Reception and legacy ==
Reception

Review scores
Publication	Score
Famitsu	28/40
IGN	7.8/10

Japan Pro Golf Tour 64 received favorable reviews. A reviewer for the Spanish magazine Magazine 64 described it as "a beautiful golf game", commenting on its character creation mechanic and the usage of real-world golf players. IGN's Peer Schneider claimed its realism set it apart from more arcade-style games like Mario Golf, and made for a great golf game for the Nintendo 64. Scheider expressed confusion and disappointment in Media Factory for choosing to make the game for the 64DD, a phased-out platform, instead of on a standard Nintendo 64 cartridge; he wrote that the company shouldn't have "[gotten] suckered into making this title". Four reviewers from Famitsu were enthusiastic towards its realistic controls, the net tournament mode, and the inclusion of real Japanese courses. Though the reviewers were critical of its lack of gamemodes, they found it an entertaining game overall.
