= Shigesato Itoi =

Japanese game designer and copywriter

- 糸井 重里
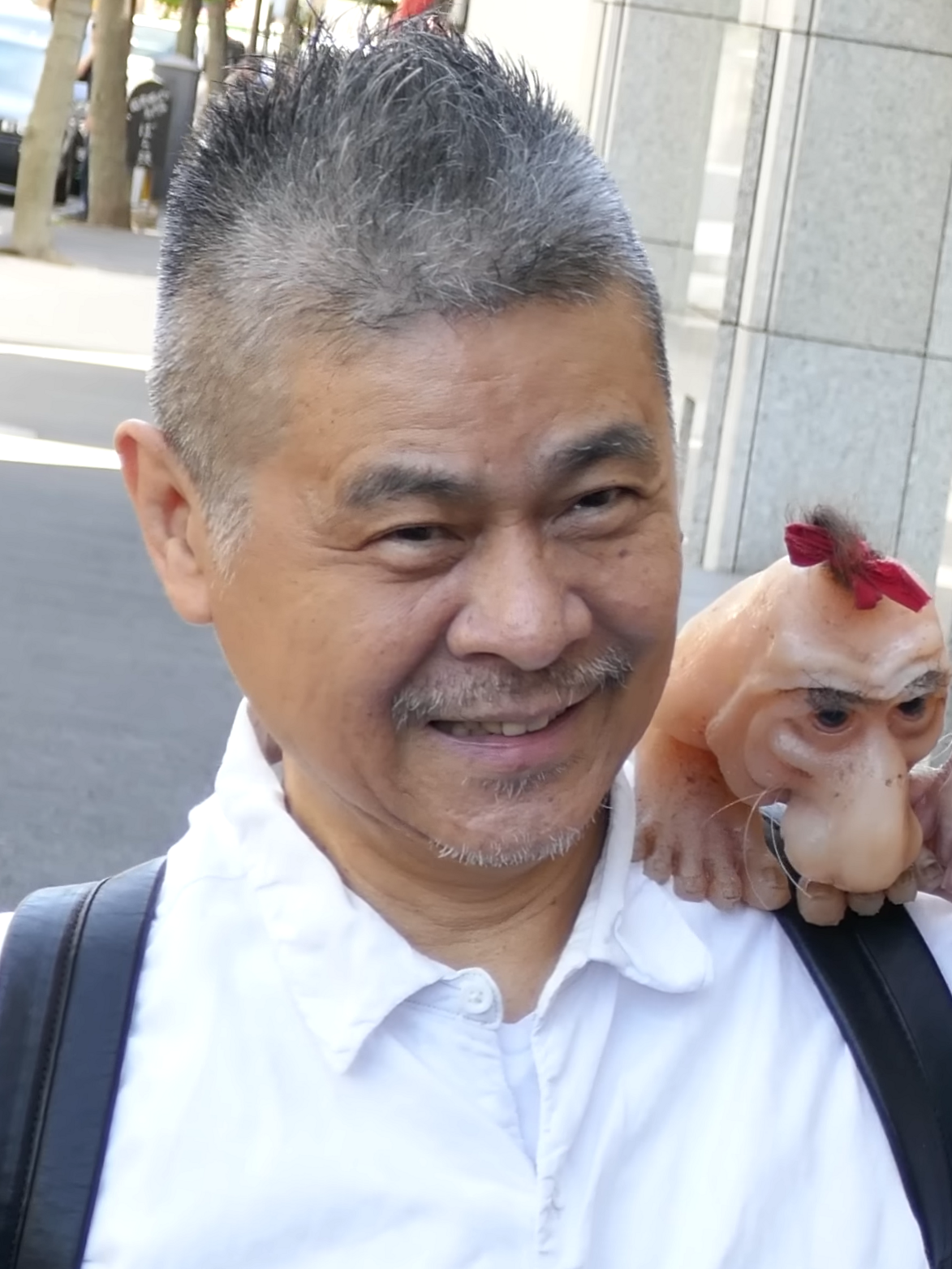
- Itoi with a Mr. Saturn figure in 2016
- Born: November 10, 1948 (age 78); Maebashi, Gunma, Japan
- Other name: Darling
- Occupations: Essayist; voice actor; copywriter; lyricist; game designer
- Known for: Mother series Almost Daily Itoi Newspaper
- Spouse: Kanako Higuchi (m. 1993)
- Website: www.1101.com/home.html

Shigesato Itoi (糸井 重里, Itoi Shigesato; born November 10, 1948) is a Japanese copywriter, essayist, lyricist, game designer, and actor. Itoi is the editor-in-chief of his website and company Hobo Nikkan Itoi Shinbun ("Almost Daily Itoi Newspaper") where he is currently the chairman and CEO.

He is best known outside Japan for his work on Nintendo's Mother series of games, a series in which he co-owns with the game company, as well as his self-titled bass fishing video game.

== Writing ==
During the 1980s Itoi established the profession of writing copy for advertisements among the general public in Japan. In 1981, he co-authored a collection of short stories titled Yume de Aimashou ("Let's meet in a dream") with writer Haruki Murakami. Later Itoi branched into writing essays, lyrics, and designing video games. He is best known outside of Japan for Nintendo's EarthBound, released in 1994 in Japan (as Mother 2: Giygas Strikes Back) and in 1995 in North America.

In 1997, Itoi began using the Internet and bought his first Macintosh. In 1998 he started the website and company Hobo Nikkan Itoi Shinbun ("Almost Daily Itoi Newspaper"), which is the center of his activity today. Under the theme of "creating good mood", the website has been updated every day since its creation with Itoi's essays on lifestyle, interviews and articles, and merchandise sales. He talks about his pet dogs and his interviews with artists, craftsmen, businessmen, etc., which tend to center on philosophical issues. Itoi has co-written several books modeled on these interviews, in which he has a series of long conversations with, for example, an expert on neurology Yūji Ikegaya, about how to live as a human being in the world. Books collecting Itoi's past essays written on the site's front page are also available for purchase.

== Filmography ==
Itoi has voiced Satsuki's father, Tatsuo Kusakabe, in the original Japanese version of the 1988 Studio Ghibli film My Neighbor Totoro. He has been a judge on several episodes of the Japanese television shows Iron Chef and Hey! Spring of Trivia. He made his live-action acting debut in 2010, when he played the role of a professor in the film adaptation of Haruki Murakami's Norwegian Wood.

Year	Film title	Role	Notes
1984	Scrap: A Love Story	Detective	
1987	Guys Who Never Learn	Kitagawa	
1987	Shigesato Itoi's TV GAME MUSEUM	Host	TV Special
1988	My Neighbor Totoro	Tatsuo Kusakabe	Voice role
1989	Gaki no tsukai ya arahende!!	Self	Television
1991	My Soul is Slashed	Inohara	
1992	Super Folk Song: Piano Ga Aishita Onna	Self	Documentary
1997	Ishoku Manga-shi 33-nen no Kiseki ~ Garo no Jidai o Yomu	Self	TV documentary
2002	Tsuki ni shizumu	Doctor	TV movie
2009	Bokura no jidai	Self	Television
2009	Kyôiku terebi no gyakushû: Yomigaeru kyoshô no kotoba	Self	
2010	Norwegian Wood	Professor	
2012	Shin 13 no kao wo motsu otoko	Self	Documentary mini-series
2012	Tabi no chikara	Self	
2015	Yoru Tamori	Self	Mini-series
2016	Chimata no hanashi	Self	
2023	EarthBound USA	Self	Documentary

== Video games ==
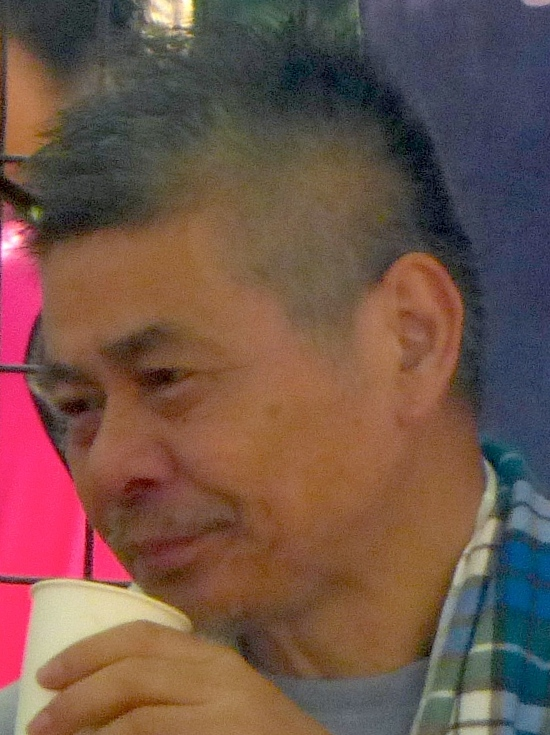
Itoi in 2015 (left) and the Hobonichi building in 2020 (right)

Itoi established the company Ape, Inc. as a venue for external developers to help make games for Nintendo. He was the creator of the Mother series. In the original Mother (released as EarthBound Beginnings in the West for Nintendo Classics) for the Famicom, he was lead designer, writer and director, while on Mother 2 (released as EarthBound in the West) for the SNES, Itoi was producer, director and writer.

He had initially envisioned Mother 3 as a highly ambitious title for the ill-fated Nintendo 64DD peripheral which would have transitioned the series into 3D graphics and featured elaborate cinematic cutscenes; however this version of the game never came to fruition due to the failure of the 64DD, and Mother 3 was instead reimagined as a 2D title for Game Boy Advance closer in scope to the first two titles, with Itoi credited as the writer of the story. Another unrealized 64DD title Itoi had been involved in developing around this time was the pet simulator video game Cabbage, which was canceled after years in development hell.

Currently, Ape Inc. still exists mainly for the purpose of managing its own intellectual properties, including EarthBound. It is an affiliated company of Nintendo as well as Shigesato Itoi's company Hobonichi. Itoi remains the CEO to this day.

Itoi claims that the final battle of EarthBound with Giygas was inspired from his accidental childhood viewing of the Shintoho film titled The Military Policeman and the Dismembered Beauty. Specifically, the scene that inspired the battle was a scene depicting a woman being murdered, which he mistook for rape.

Itoi has said that he would not be involved in a fourth title of the series. Itoi's works have had an impact on other games and other media, such as Undertale. Toby Fox considered pitching to Itoi that he could help him make a fourth game in the Mother franchise, but changed his mind after Itoi encouraged Fox to make a sequel to Undertale.

Year	Game title	Role
1989	EarthBound Beginnings	Director, game designer, writer
1993	Monopoly	Producer
1994	EarthBound	Director, producer, writer, Saturn font concept, sampling voice
1995	The Monopoly Game 2	Supervisor
1997	Itoi Shigesato no Bass Tsuri No. 1	Original concept, supervisor
2006	Mother 3	Writer, sampling voice
N/A	Cabbage	Designer

== Other ventures ==
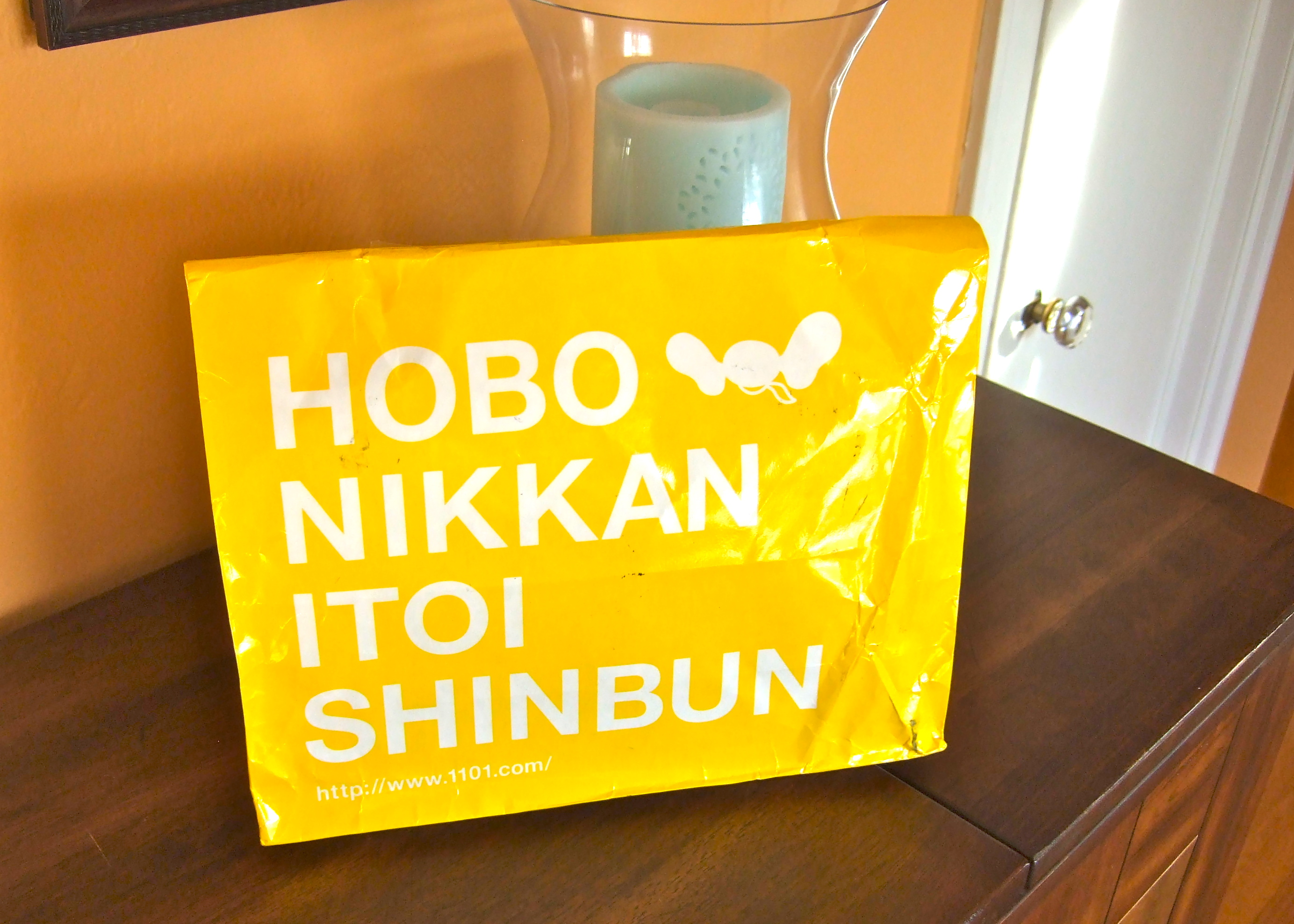
Hobo Nikkan Itoi Shinbun packaging in January 2015

Shigesato Itoi worked with Nintendo to design video game-themed haramaki.

Itoi is an avid Monopoly player and is President of the Japan Monopoly Association (日本モノポリー協会, Nihon Monopoly Kyōkai). He also competed in the 1992 Monopoly World Championships and placed eighth. Itoi's video game development company Ape, Inc. developed two Monopoly games for the Super Famicom, with Itoi serving as producer. These versions of Monopoly were not released outside of Japan and featured a more role-playing experience.

Itoi launched a photo creation tool called "Dokonoko", which is designed specifically to be used with pets. It has been described as an "Instagram for pets". Dokonoko is most famous for a particular Japanese Labrador Retriever named Corky, who made front line news because of the abnormal length of her tongue.

== Personal life ==
Itoi was born on November 10, 1948, and raised in Maebashi, Gunma. He was a heavy smoker until he quit in 2002. Itoi has been married to actress Kanako Higuchi since 1993. He has a daughter from a previous marriage, whose handwriting inspired the style of the Japanese characters for the Mr. Saturns in EarthBound. In a 2019 interview, he mentioned that he has asthma, which causes him to cough when lying down. He would often play Mario when he was unable to sleep at night due to his asthma, and stated that he felt "indebted to Nintendo" and specifically wanted to work with them on Mother due to this. The protagonist of the game, Ninten, also has asthma, which was one of the first aspects of his character Itoi came up with.
