= Mario Artist =

1999–2000 video game suite

- Cover art for Mario Artist: Paint Studio and mouse
- Genres: Art tool; Graphics suite
- Developers: Nintendo EAD; Nichimen Graphics; Software Creations
- Publisher: Nintendo
- Platform: 64DD
- Original release: Paint Studio: JP: December 11, 1999; Talent Studio: JP: February 23, 2000; Communication Kit: JP: June 29, 2000; Polygon Studio: JP: August 29, 2000

Mario Artist (Note: Japanese: マリオアーティスト, Hepburn: Mario Ātisuto) is an interoperable suite of three games and one Internet application for Nintendo 64: Paint Studio, Talent Studio, Polygon Studio, and Communication Kit. These flagship disks for the 64DD peripheral were developed to turn the game console into an Internet multimedia workstation. A bundle of the 64DD unit, software disks, hardware accessories, and the Randnet online service subscription package was released in Japan starting in December 1999.

Development was managed by Nintendo EAD and Nintendo of America, in conjunction with two other independent development companies: Polygon Studio was developed by the professional 3D graphics software developer, Nichimen Graphics; and Paint Studio was developed by Software Creations of the UK.

Paint Studio was titled Mario Paint 64 in development, conceived as the sequel to Super NES game Mario Paint (1992). IGN called Talent Studio the 64DD's "killer app".

== Suite ==
=== Paint Studio ===
Screenshot from an early build of Paint Studio depicting an in-progress drawing of Pikachu

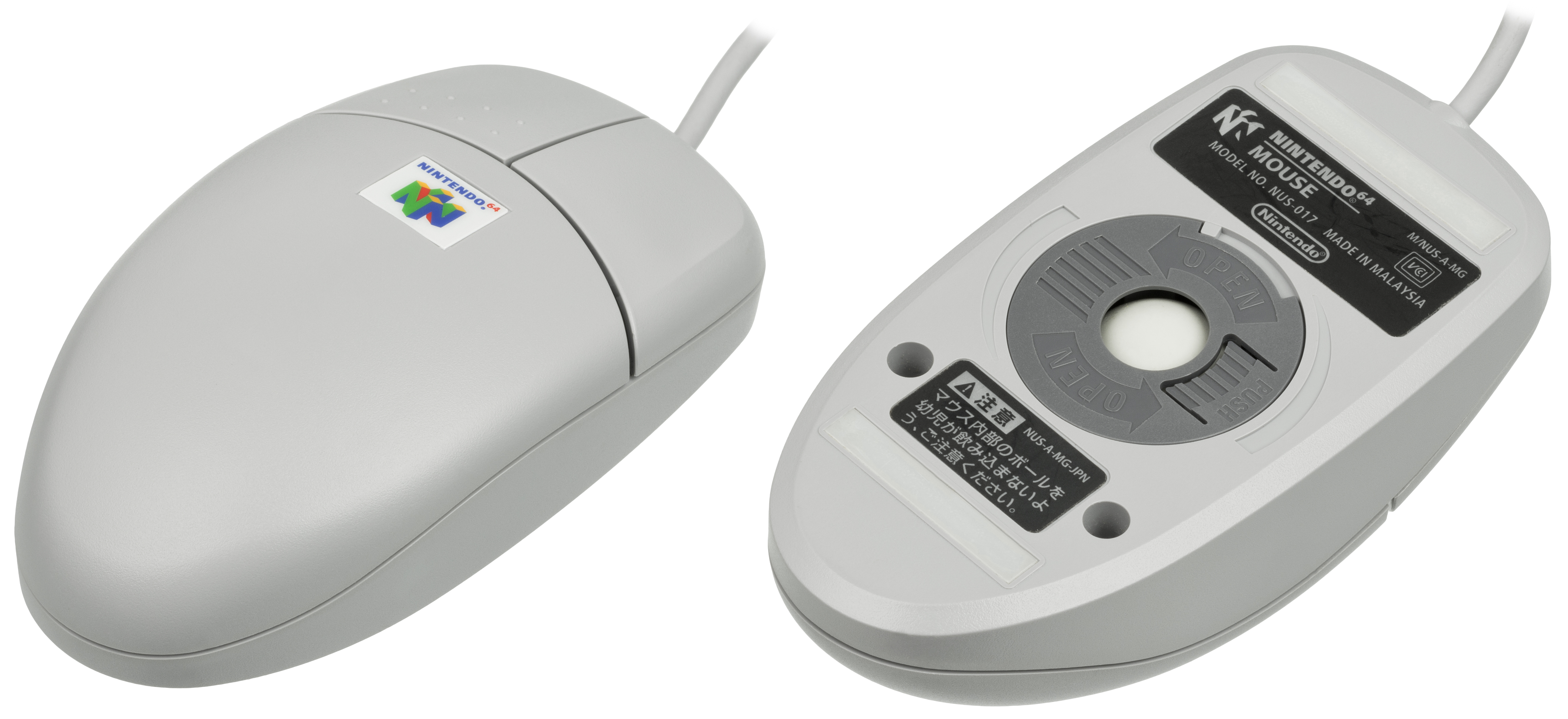
The Paint Studio package includes the Nintendo 64 Mouse.

Mario Artist: Paint Studio, (Note: Mario Artist: Paint Studio (マリオアーティスト ペイントスタジオ)) released on December 11, 1999, is a Mario-themed paint program. The user has a variety of brush sizes, textures, and stamps, with which to paint, draw, spray, sketch, and animate. The stock Nintendo-themed graphics include all 151 Red- and Blue-era Pokémon, Banjo-Kazooie, and Diddy Kong Racing characters. Previously titled Mario Paint 64 in development, Paint Studio has been described as the "direct follow-up" and "spiritual successor" to the SNES's Mario Paint, and as akin to an Adobe Photoshop for kids.

On June 1, 1995, Nintendo of America commissioned the independent UK game studio Software Creations, soliciting a single design concept for "a sequel to Mario Paint in 3D for the N64". John Pickford initially pitched a 3D "living playground", where the user edits the attributes of premade models such as dinosaurs, playing with their sizes, behaviors, aggression, speed, and texture design. The project's working title was Creator, then Mario Paint 64, then Picture Maker as demonstrated at Nintendo's Space World 1997 trade show in November 1997, and then Mario Artist & Camera. Software Creations reflected on political infighting between Nintendo's two sites: "eventually the Japanese took control and rejected many of the ideas which had been accepted enthusiastically by the Americans, steering the project in a different direction after John left Software Creations to form Zed Two, and throwing away loads of work."

The audio functionality was split out into Sound Studio, also known as Sound Maker at Nintendo Space World 1997, where it was mentioned but not shown. By 2000, development reportedly included music producer Tetsuya Komuro. It was canceled.

Published as a bundle with the Nintendo 64 Mouse, it is one of the two 64DD launch games on December 11, 1999, along with Doshin the Giant. Using the Nintendo 64 Capture Cassette cartridge (released later in a bundle with Talent Studio), the user can import images and movies from any NTSC video source such as video tape or a video camera. The Japanese version of the Game Boy Camera can import grayscale photographs via the Transfer Pak. The studio features a unique four player drawing mode. A minigame reminiscent of Pokémon Snap appears where a player can also take photos and change creatures' textures.

=== Talent Studio ===
Mario Artist: Talent Studio (Note: Mario Artist: Talent Studio (マリオアーティスト タレントスタジオ)) was released on February 23, 2000. It was bundled with the Nintendo 64 Capture Cassette, a Nintendo 64 cartridge with RCA connector jacks and a microphone port on the back. Its working title was Talent Maker as demonstrated at Nintendo's Space World 1997 trade show in November 1997. It was described by designer Shigeru Miyamoto as "a newly reborn Mario Paint" upon a brief demonstration at the Game Developers Conference in March 1999 as his example of a fresh game concept. The game presents the player's character design as being a self-made television stage talent or celebrity. It is a simple animation production studio which lets the user insert captured images such as human faces onto 3D models which had been made with Polygon Studio, dress up the models from an assortment of hundreds of clothes and accessories, and then animate the models with sound, music, and special effects. The player can connect an analog video source such as a VCR or camcorder to the Capture Cassette and record movies on the Nintendo 64. A photograph of a person's face from a video source via the Capture Cassette or from the Game Boy Camera via the Transfer Pak, may be mapped onto the characters created in Polygon Studio and placed into movies created with Talent Studio.

IGN describes Talent Studio as the 64DD's "killer app" with a graphical interface that's "so easy to use that anyone can figure it out after a few minutes", letting the user create "fashion shows, karate demonstrations, characters waiting outside a bathroom stall, and more" which feature the user's own face. Paintings can be imported into the completely separate 64DD game, SimCity 64. Nintendo designer Yamashita Takayuki attributes his work on Talent Studio as having been foundational to his eventual work on the Mii.

According to Shigeru Miyamoto, Talent Studio's direct descendant is a GameCube prototype called Stage Debut, using the Game Boy Advance's GameEye camera peripheral and linking to the GameCube via a cable, to map self-portraits of players onto their character models. It was publicly demonstrated with models of Miyamoto and eventual Nintendo president Satoru Iwata. Never having been released, its character design features became the Mii, the Mii Channel, and features of games such as Wii Tennis.

In my mind, it's still alive. There's a portion of the Stage Debut game, which essentially became the Miis and the Mii Channel. So if we were to ask the question of, what would we do if we were to make the Miis more realistic and lifelike, then that might turn into something more like Stage Debut. So, of course, we still have the staff who worked on that and it's something that is done, but in my mind it's something that's always alive.

— Shigeru Miyamoto, 2008

=== Communication Kit ===
Mario Artist: Communication Kit, (Note: Mario Artist: Communication Kit (マリオアーティスト コミュニケーションキット)) released on June 29, 2000, is a utility application which allowed users to connect to the Net Studio of the now-defunct Randnet dialup service and online community for 64DD users. In Net Studio, it was possible to share creations made with Paint Studio, Talent Studio, or Polygon Studio, with other Randnet members. Other features included contests, and printing services available by online mail order for making custom 3D papercraft and postcards. The Randnet network service was launched and discontinued alongside the 64DD, running from December 1, 1999, to February 28, 2001.

The disk has content that may be unlocked and used in other games in the series such as Paint Studio.

=== Polygon Studio ===
Mario Artist: Polygon Studio, (Note: Mario Artist: Polygon Studio (マリオアーティスト ポリゴンスタジオ)) released on August 29, 2000, is a 3D computer graphics editor that lets the user design and render 3D polygon images with a simple level of detail. It has been described as a consumer version of the professional 3D graphics suite N-World, also by Nichimen Graphics. It was originally announced as Polygon Maker at Nintendo's Space World '96 trade show, demonstrated at Space World 1997 in November 1997, and renamed to Polygon Studio at Space World '99. It was scheduled as the final game in the original Starter Kit's mail order delivery of 64DD games, but it did not arrive on time, leading IGN to assume it was canceled until it was later released. The Expansion Pak and the Nintendo 64 Mouse are supported peripherals.

The idea of minigames was popularized generally during the Nintendo 64's fifth generation of video game consoles, and some early minigames appear in Polygon Studio in the style that were later used in the WarioWare series. Certain minigames originated in Polygon Studio, as explained by Goro Abe of Nintendo R&D1's so-called WarioWare All-Star Team: "In Polygon Studio you could create 3D models and animate them in the game, but there was also a side game included inside. In this game you would have to play short games that came one after another. This is where the idea for WarioWare came from."

The art form of papercraft was implemented by modeling the characters in Polygon Studio and then using Communication Kit to upload the data to Randnet's online printing service. The user finally cuts, folds, and pastes the resulting colored paper into a 3D physical figure.

=== Unreleased ===
Mario Artist: Sound Maker was prototyped to create music tracks, but was ultimately canceled. Three additional Maker games unrelated to the Mario Artist suite were announced and canceled: Game Maker, Graphical Message Maker, and Video Jockey Maker.

== Reception ==
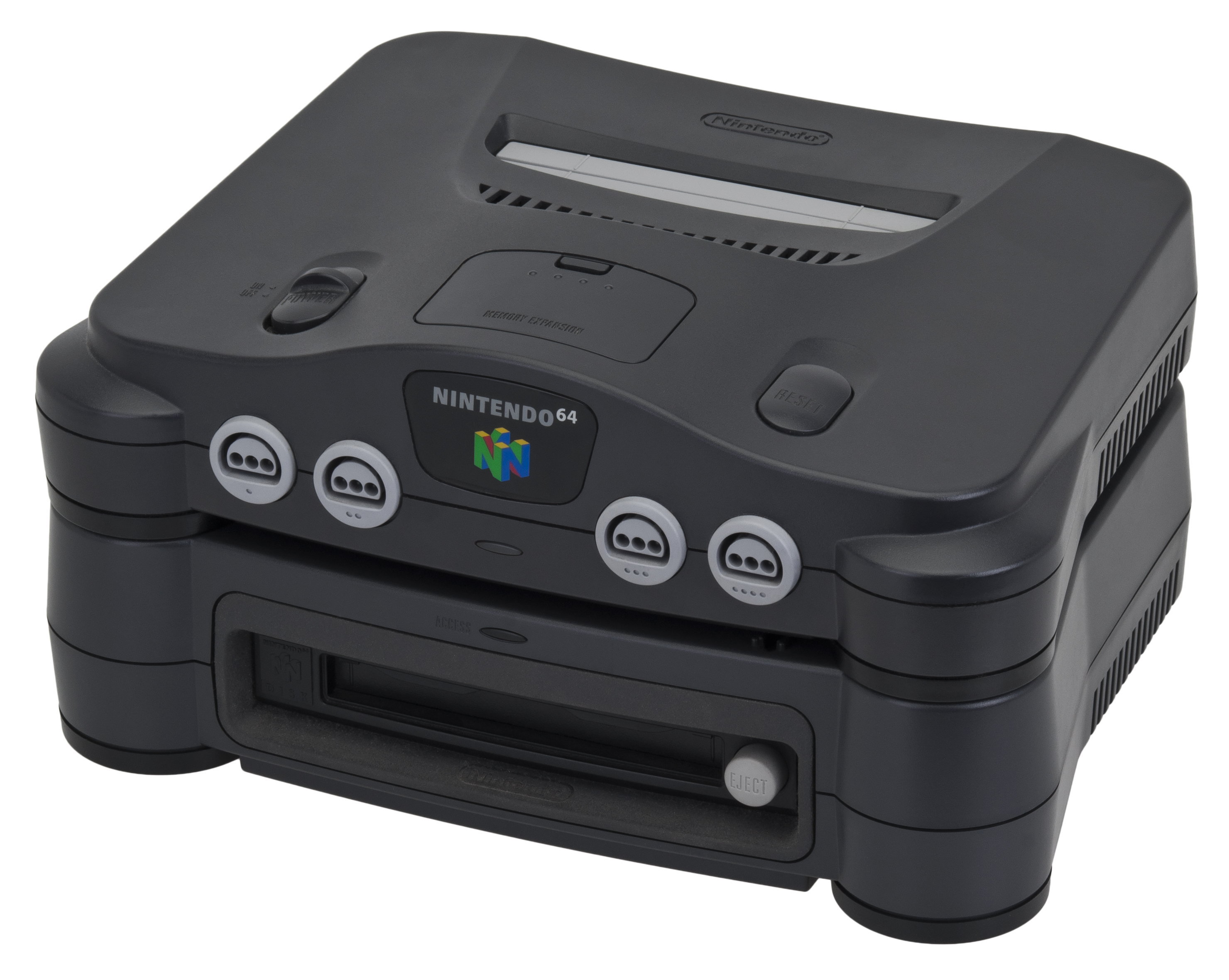
The Nintendo 64 and 64DD are attached.

Nintendo World Report described the Mario Artist series as a "spiritual successor to Mario Paint". IGN collectively described the Mario Artist suite as a layperson's analog to professional quality graphics development software. They stated that the combination of the 64DD's mass writability and the Nintendo 64's 3D graphics allowed Nintendo to "leave CD systems behind", by offering "something that couldn't be done on any other gaming console on the market" to people "who want to unleash their creative talents and perhaps learn a little bit about graphics design on the side". The designer of Paint Studio, Software Creations, roughly estimated that 7,500 copies of that game may have been sold.

IGN rated Paint Studio at 7.0 ("Good") out of 10. Peer Schneider described it as a powerful, affordable, and easy-to-use 2D and 3D content creation tool unmatched by other video game consoles, although minimally comparable to personal computer applications. He likened it to an edutainment version of Adobe Photoshop for children, and a good neophyte introduction to the Internet. He considered Paint Studio to embody Nintendo's originally highly ambitious plans for 64DD, and to thus suffer greatly due to the cancellation of most Paint Studio-integrated disk games and the application's incompatibility with cartridge-based games.

Rating it at 8.2 ("Great") out of 10, IGN called Talent Studio the 64DD's "killer app" with a graphical interface that is "so easy to use that anyone can figure it out after a few minutes", and featuring "breathtaking motion-captured animation".

=== Legacy ===
Polygon Studio contains the minigame, "Sound Bomber", which consists of several microgames. This concept, envisioned by programmer Kouichi Kawamoto, inspired the creation of the WarioWare series.

Talent Studio gave rise to an unreleased GameCube prototype called Stage Debut, which in turn yielded character design features which became the Mii, the Mii Channel, and features of other games such as Wii Tennis.

== See also ==
- Famicom BASIC, the first system for programming and game-making on a Nintendo system launched in 1984
- Mario no Photopi, a photo editing and printing game similar to Mario Artist: Paint Studio was planned for 64DD and released on cartridge in 1998
- Super Mario Maker, a series of game editor, online publisher, and video game launched in 2015
