= Enabling technology =

The Wikimedia Foundation and WMDE are currently working to integrate structured data support with the software that enables Wikidata, Wikibase, into Wikimedia Commons.

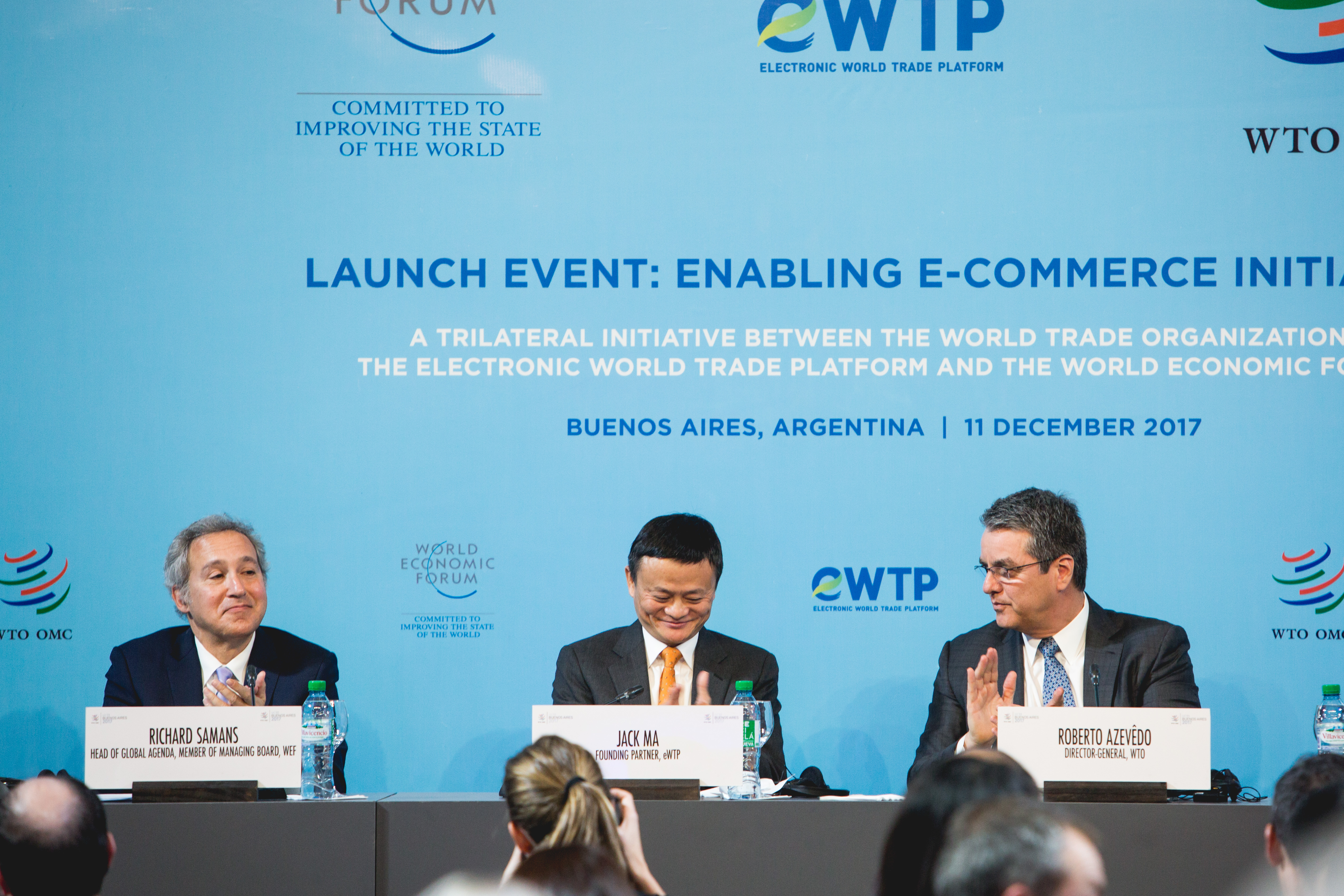
“Enabling E-commerce” launch event, 11 December 2017 (27239205469)

An enabling technology is an invention or innovation that can be applied to drive radical change in the capabilities of a user or culture. Enabling technologies are characterized by rapid development of subsequent derivative technologies, often in diverse fields.

Equipment and/or methodology that, solely or in combination with associated technologies, provides the means to increase performance and capabilities of the user, product or process. An enabling technology have capability to radically improve or positively change the status quo. It is in recognition of this potential that the United Nations Sustainable Development Goal 5 targets the use of enabling technology to promote the empowerment of women.

== Historically significant enabling technologies ==
The history of enabling technology can be broken down into three different time periods, the ancient era, the classical era, and the modern era. All three eras had extremely important enabling technologies within them, although the modern era has the most due to the industrial revolution and the information age.

=== Ancient and prehistorical eras ===
- Mechanics: Established by Archytas the Tarantine as a combination of mathematics and structures
- Glasses: Allowed visually impaired people to actually see clearly for the first time
- Ceramics: Artificial material created by firing several raw materials together creating a hard, rock like product
- The plow: Farming tool that allowed for faster preparation of soil before planting
- Gunpowder: Revolutionized warfare from swords, catapults, and bows to gun fights

=== Classical era ===
- The printing press: Revolutionized the way people conceive and describe the world they live in, ushering in the period of modernity
- The telescope: Allowed for more detailed exploration of the universe beyond what the human eye could comprehend
- Refrigeration: Allowed for human control of air temperature to keep goods and food fresh for a longer period of time
- Mariner's compass: Allowed sailors to navigate the seas without having to use celestial bodies

=== Modern era ===
- Manufacturing: The rapid creation of usable products in large abundance, seen early in the automobile industry
- Reinforced concrete: Allowed for the building of taller and stronger buildings, leading to the birth of skyscrapers
- Elevator: Allowed buildings to be built higher instead of wider, which caused cities' population densities to spike
- Steam engine: The stationary steam engine was a key component of the Industrial Revolution, allowing factories to locate where water power was unavailable
- Electric motor: Machine that converts electrical energy into mechanical energy using electricity and magnetic fields, creating a dynamic and cost effective motor
- Incandescent light bulb: Invented by Thomas Edison, this let individuals switch from oil powered lighting to electrical powered lighting
- Rechargeable battery: Created the opportunity to have a single battery for machines that can be recharged, rather than using multiple batteries
- Ballpoint pen: Created a way to write more consistently and comfortably without having to dip your pen in ink
- Bessemer process: Revolutionized the steel refining process, making it much quicker
- Photography: Revolutionized portraiture and art
- Telephone: Alexander Graham Bell invented the telephone which revolutionized communication between geographically distant individuals
- FM radio: Allowed for the transmission of audio from a broadcast tower to radios within range
- Internal combustion engine: The stepping stone for the modern automobile, which revolutionized transportation
- Anesthetics: Allowed for more serious and longer surgeries with much more comfort for the patients
- Antibiotics: Allowed for effective treatment of infectious diseases, most of which were previously lethal
- Flight: Revolutionized travel and transportation across the world
- Personal computer: Allowed for extremely fast calculating times and later was the basis for the Internet
- Internet: The Internet has enabled new forms of social interaction, activities, and social associations
- Cloud computing: Allowed for affordable and fast access to high end computing equipment over the internet
- Interseasonal thermal energy storage: Enables recycling of waste heat and utilization of natural energy (e.g., summer's solar heat or winter's cold) for heating or cooling in the opposite season
- 3D printing: "Three-dimensional printing makes it as cheap to create single items as it is to produce thousands and thus undermines economies of scale. It may have as profound an impact on the world as the coming of the factory did."

== Impact of technology on society ==
Throughout history, technology has continuously influenced all aspects of the society. It has impacted how humans think, learn and communicate. The world is presently witnessing an era with frequent technological inventions, which have both positive and negative impacts on how people go about their daily activities.

== See also ==
- General purpose technology
- Technology
- Technological evolution
- Technology and society
- Critique of technology
- Philosophy of technology
- Technology lifecycle
