= Association of Media in Digital Awards =

Annual Japanese award for digital content

- Native name: デジタルメディア協会
- Country: Japan
- First award: 1995
- Website: AMD Award

Association of Media in Digital awards (デジタルメディア協会, AMD Awards) recognizes and honors an individual or group of digital content creators for their outstanding works or services that have been released or presented in the past year. Digital Content of the Year Award is the highest award offered by the and the Ministry of Internal Affairs and Communications.

== Overview ==
The AMD Award is sponsored by the Ministry of Internal Affairs and Communications and implemented by the Association of Media in Digital. The awards are given to digital content that has contributed to the development of the Japanese content industry during the previous year. The awards have been given to a wide range of activities including movies, animation, games, music, artists, and services.

== Recipients ==
Year	Annual Name	Grand Prize / Minister of Internal Affairs and Communications Award	President's Award	Excellence Award	Life Achievement Award	Rookie Award	Regional Achievement Award
2010	16th AMD Awards	AKB48	Pokémon Black and White	IS PARADE	Toma Silde, Jean-Francewa Dufour, Sandrine Dufour, Shibo Sae	Yuichi Kodama	Aomori video content promotion business
2011	17th AMD Awards	Hatsune Miku	Kyushu Shinkansen full line opening "celebration! Kyushu" campaign	Nintendo 3DS	N/A	Toshiyuki Inoko + TeamLab	BRASIL GIFU Multicultural Coexistence Project
2012	18th AMD Awards	Wolf Children's	EPUB 3	Space Brothers Project	National Diet Library	Daito Manabe	Koshi Agutto! Net
2013	19th AMD Awards	Attack on Titan	Sound of Honda / Ayrton Senna 1989	Kantai Collectrion-Kancolle?	Yasuki Hamano	Futago Sputu!	Operation of Internet TV stations by the elderly
2014	20th AMD Awards	Yo-Kai Watch	SmartNews	"STAND BY ME Doraemon"	N/A	Minoru Fujimoto	Bringing attractive Ehime theater content overseas
2015	21st AMD Awards	Universal Cool Japan	Splatoon	ULTRA JAPAN 2015	Ken Kutaragi	Tatsuya Honda	Kobayashi City, Miyazaki Prefecture Emigration promotion PR movie "Damoshitan Kobayashi"
2016	22nd AMD Awards	Super Kabuki "Senbonzakura is a feast of the past and present "	PPAP (Pen-Pineapple Appo Pen)	Pokémon GO	Shibusawa Kou	N/A	Go, Shinfuro club!
2017	23rd AMD Awards	Nintendo Switch	Ah, Wilderness	AbemaTV	"Dragon Quest" series	Hirofumi Seo	This Coverry Aomori 2
2018	24th AMD Awards	Chico-chan scolds me!	U.S.A. (Da Pump song)	Monster Hunter: World	Hideki Okamura	Paradel Cartoonist Osamu Honda	Kumamoto reconstruction drama "Together Susumu Salon Yataimura"
2019	25th AMD Awards	AI Hibari Misora	Breaking through the limits x Survivor (Dragon Ball Super Song)	Demon Slayer: Kimetsu no Yaiba	Haruomi Hosono	Akihiko Kusanagi	OUR Shurijo Everyone's Shurijo Castle Digital Restoration Project
2020	26th AMD Awards	Demon Slayer: Kimetsu no Yaiba – The Movie: Mugen Train	Animal Crossing: New Horizons	GUNDAM FACTORY YOKOHAMA	HIKAKIN	Hina Kagei	"Memory of the monument" project
