= Nintendo Space World =

Trade show

Nintendo Space World (Shoshinkai) 任天堂スペースワールド
- Status: Inactive
- Genre: Video game trade show
- Frequency: Annual
- Locations: Kyoto, Japan; Makuhari Messe, Chiba, Japan
- Country: Japan
- Years active: 1989–2001
- Inaugurated: July 28, 1989; 37 years ago (as Shoshinkai)
- Most recent: August 24, 2001
- Organizer: Nintendo

Nintendo Space World, (Note: Japanese: 任天堂スペースワールド, Hepburn: Nintendō Supēsu Wārudo) formerly named Shoshinkai (Note: Japanese: 初心会) and Famicom Space World, (Note: Japanese: ファミコンスペースワールド, Hepburn: Famikon Supēsu Wārudo) was an annual video game trade show hosted by Nintendo from 1989 to 2001. Its three days of high-energy party atmosphere was the primary venue for Nintendo and its licensees to announce and demonstrate new consoles, accessories, and games. Anticipated and dissected each year with hype and exclusivity, it was a destination for the international video game press, with detailed developer interviews and technology demos.

The show was the launch or marketing flashpoints of countless products, especially Nintendo's flagship platforms and video games. The show launched the Super Famicom, Nintendo 64, 64DD, Game Boy Advance, GameCube, and all the ongoing games in the Super Mario, The Legend of Zelda, and Pokémon franchises. Some major exhibits were teased and then never seen again, leaving fans and press to maintain hype and inquiry for years, as with the Super Mario 128 demo spectacle, the controversial art style of the Wind Waker teaser video, Mother 3 (EarthBound 64), and a litany of lost 64DD games.

== Format ==
The three day format began with one day called Shoshinkai (lit. "beginning party") exclusively for press attendance, and two days called Space World for open public attendance. Nintendo officially referred to the whole event as "Shoshinkai" for some years until 1996, and then as "Space World" since 1997. The show floor had many third party booths surrounding Nintendo's large main booths, all with videos and many playable prerelease games, and some with outlandish decor and character performances. Unlike most other video game trade events, only Nintendo decided whether and when to hold each annual show. It was in Japan, either in Kyoto which also hosts Nintendo's headquarters, or at the Makuhari Messe convention center in Chiba. After the most recent Space World show in 2001, the company instead began to favor online publishing and industry-wide conferences such as E3.

Nintendo Power explains: "Q: What is Famicom Space World? A: Space World is a free show for the public that follows the one-day Shoshinkai. Gamers who wish to attend need only pick up an entry pass at any official Nintendo retail location in Japan."

== History ==
=== Shoshinkai 1989 ===
The first Shoshinkai show was held on July 28, 1989. The Super Famicom was announced and Super Mario World was reportedly shown.

=== Shoshinkai 1990 ===
The second Shoshinkai show was held on August 28–29, 1990. The final version of the Super Famicom was unveiled to the public. Famicom, Super Famicom, and Game Boy games were on display in areas that Nintendo called "Symbolic Zones".

=== Shoshinkai 1991 ===
The third Shoshinkai show was held on April 24 to May 6, 1991. The Super Famicom had been on the market for a few months and much attention was given to its games including Final Fantasy IV and The Legend of Zelda: A Link to the Past.

=== Shoshinkai 1992 ===
The fourth Shoshinkai show was held on August 26, 1992. The Super FX chip was announced.

=== Shoshinkai 1993 ===
The fifth Shoshinkai show was held on August 25, 1993. On August 25, President of Nintendo, Hiroshi Yamauchi, announced Project Reality, a major strategic partnership with Silicon Graphics for the development of what would become the Nintendo 64.

=== Shoshinkai 1994 ===
The sixth Shoshinkai show was held on November 15–16, 1994. Project Reality had already been renamed Ultra 64.

Hiroshi Yamauchi introduced the portable Virtual Boy console, along with its hardware specifications, launch games, and future games. The startup screen of the prototype was shown. A "very confident" projection of "sales in Japan of 3 million hardware units and 14 million software units by March 1996" was given to the press. The demo of what would have been a Star Fox game showed an Arwing doing various spins and motions.

Gamers who previewed the system complained that the Mario demo was not realistic enough, was not in full color, and did not motion-track the image when players turn their heads. In the lead editorial of Electronic Gaming Monthly following the show, Ed Semrad predicted that the Virtual Boy would have poor launch sales due to the monochrome screen, lack of true portability, unimpressive lineup of games seen at Shoshinkai, and the price, which he argued was as low as it could get given the hardware but still too expensive for the experience the system offered. Next Generation's editors were also dubious of the Virtual Boy's prospects when they left the show, and concluded their article on the system by commenting, "But who will buy it? It's not portable, it's awkward to use, it's 100% antisocial (unlike multiplayer SNES/Genesis games), it's too expensive and – most importantly – the 'VR' (i.e. 3D effect) doesn't add to the game at all: it's just a novelty."

=== Shoshinkai 1995 ===
The seventh Shoshinkai show was held on November 22–24, 1995, at the Makuhari Messe convention center in Chiba, Japan. Popular Mechanics described the scene where "hordes of Japanese schoolkids huddled in the cold outside an exhibition hall in a small town near Tokyo, the electricity of anticipation clearly rippling through their ranks". Nintendo Power interviewed Shigeru Miyamoto and Takashi Tezuka about the development of Super Mario 64, Zelda, and game philosophy.

The show featured the public unveiling of the newly renamed Nintendo 64 console, with thirteen games. This included the playable prototypes of Super Mario 64 and Kirby Ball 64, and a videotape containing a total of three minutes of very early footage of eleven other Nintendo 64 games. Of all these, the development of Super Mario 64 was reportedly the most advanced, though only 50 percent complete. Twelve playable demos had been prepared for the show, but Hiroshi Yamauchi removed ten of them from the itinerary just days beforehand. Zelda 64 was shown in the form of an abstract technical and thematic demonstration video, where Next Generation magazine said "Well, the fact is that the videotape sequences shown at Shoshinkai bear very little resemblance to what the final product will actually look like. Spectacular scenes of a surprisingly large Link clad in polished armor are most likely to end up in cut-scenes rather than representing the actual play." Some brief early footage of Mario Kart 64 was shown on November 24, which Miyamoto said was 95% complete, but which was not shown in playable form due to the difficult logistics of demonstrating the multiplayer features. Computer and Video Games reported overall.

Nintendo made its first announcement of the 64DD peripheral, saying it would be launched by the end of 1996, though releasing virtually no technical specifications. New and upcoming role-playing games for the Super Famicom, Virtual Boy, and Game Boy were exhibited, including Pokémon Red and Green.

=== Shoshinkai 1996 ===
Shoshinkai 1996 logo

The eighth Shoshinkai show was held on November 22–24, 1996 at the Makuhari Messe convention center in Chiba, Japan. New software was shown for the Nintendo 64, Super NES, and Game Boy. Nintendo of America's website published a report of the show including photos and videos, the roster of Nintendo 64 games and some demo reviews, and a translated summary (from Famimaga 64 issue 12) of a panel discussion among key personnel about their philosophy of Nintendo 64 game development.

This show bore the first demonstration of the 64DD. IGN reported that this was one of the biggest items of the show along with first-party games, but other gaming press said 64DD was kept out of the spotlight and had no meaningful demonstration of capabilities. Nintendo stated that it was deliberately downplaying the 64DD at the show in order to demonstrate the ongoing commitment to the cartridge format. Nintendo's Director of Corporate Communications, Perrin Kaplan, made the company's first official launch window announcement for 64DD, scheduled for late 1997 in Japan. The 64DD system was shown in its own display booth with the hardware specifications having been finalized, according to Nintendo of America's Chairman Howard Lincoln. Super Mario 64 ran on 64DD, which was an improvised conversion from the new retail cartridge release onto floppy disk to demonstrate the bootable prototype floppy drive, only at this show. Lincoln explained, "Super Mario 64 is running on the 64DD right now. First they weren't going to show anything on 64DD, but they decided at the last minute to have a game people recognize." The booth also demonstrated the process of rendering audience members' photographed faces onto 3D avatars and shapes—a feature which was ultimately incorporated and released in 2000 as Mario Artist: Talent Studio and the Capture Cassette for 64DD. Another 64DD game in development was Creator, a music and animation game by Software Creations, the same UK company that had made Sound Tool for the Nintendo Ultra 64 development kit. They touted the game's ability to be integrated into other games, allowing a player to replace any such game's textures and possibly create new levels and characters. There was no playable version of Creator available at this show, but the project was later absorbed into Mario Artist: Paint Studio (1999).

Reportedly several developers attended the show to learn how to develop for 64DD, some having traveled from the US for the 64DD presentation and some having received 64DD development kits. Included in the early roster of committed 64DD developers, Rare officially discounted any rumors of the peripheral's impending pre-release cancellation.

N64.com described the presentation of Zelda 64 as "very quick shots on videotape". Yoshi's Island 64 debuted in a short video, and was eventually released as Yoshi's Story. "The biggest surprise" of the show according to IGN and "most impressive [new peripheral]" according to Electronic Gaming Monthly was the Jolting Pak, which was eventually launched as the Rumble Pak in a bundle with the upcoming Star Fox 64. Next Generation derisively claimed it "was seen as merely another whimsical Nintendo fancy destined to the bin marked Good Idea at the Time".

Miyamoto was interviewed, including about 64DD and Jolting Pak.

The highly anticipated EarthBound 64 debuted as a video trailer segment within the overall video loop of gameplay footage. Copies of this footage were hunted and analyzed for decades as part of EarthBound fandom lore. A teaser for Project Dream, which would eventually evolve into Banjo-Kazooie, was produced for the show.

=== Space World 1997 ===
The ninth show was renamed to Space World, held on November 21–24, 1997. Some media of the event was streamed live on Nintendo's website. The event was heavily focused on the Japan market and on peripheral hardware, with several 64DD demonstrations and the unveiling of the Game Boy Camera, Game Boy Printer, Transfer Pak, Nintendo 64 Mouse, and Voice Recognition Unit. The event featured an early prototype of Pokémon Gold and Silver, with two starting Pokémon which do not appear in the final game, and Chikorita which resembled its final appearance. The game was not completed until 1999, largely changed. The ROM image for this demo was anonymously dumped and released online on May 31, 2018. Other featured games include Pocket Monsters Stadium, Pikachu Genki Dechu (Hey You, Pikachu!), and Pokémon Snap.

Next Generation magazine relayed Chairman Hiroshi Yamauchi's speech that Nintendo 64 adoption in Japan was unexpectedly unfavorable, due to general declination of home console games as often "boring or complicated" and unappealing to ordinary users, and lionizing the mobile Pocket Monsters as the exemplar to learn from. Nintendo again delayed the 64DD launch; the magazine staff discerned (and witnessed of American visitors) no appeal toward the US market from any current 64DD software (mostly Mario Artist and Pocket Monsters), and said "64DD's future does not look good". Nintendo instead mainly promoted Pocket Monsters as the best selling game of 1997 and of all time on Game Boy. The magazine said "Miyamoto's brace of games on display all lived up to expectations" with Zelda 64 as "the focal point on the show floor", with a small game world playable demonstration, and reported seeing a general consensus that "it's even better than Super Mario 64". Nintendo demonstrated F-Zero X and the surprise game 1080° Snowboarding. Miyamoto interviewed about the secret prototype of Cabbage for 64DD and Game Boy.

The magazine said "third-party software, however, mostly continues to suck" with no evidence of Nintendo improving third-party developer relations. San Mehat of Argonaut Games attributed this to a lack of Nintendo's development systems, lack of publishers, lack of cartridge data capacity, and big competition from Nintendo. George Harrison, the Vice President of Nintendo of America, candidly explained that the show's third-party developers were often lackluster because of the unexpected difficulty inherent to the industry's transition from 2D to 3D game development where even some members of the heavily supported Dream Team had struggled with Project Reality, procurement costs of the Nintendo 64 Game Pak, Nintendo's lack of developer support, and the inherent difficulty in competing with Nintendo.

Certainly [64DD] hasn't been sidelined, it's still in the starting gate. [Nintendo can't guarantee that the 64DD will launch in the US in 1998], but what we can say is that it will launch when it is ready and when we have a compelling piece of software for it. But it's an accessory and we all know the history of selling add-ons in this marketplace, and to be successful we'd have to get a 60%-to-80% penetration of this 64DD into the installed base of N64 to be considered a success. We can't just have 10% or 20% of people buy it, otherwise it wouldn't make any sense to continue software support for it.

— George Harrison, VP of Nintendo of America, April 1997

=== Space World 1999 ===
Having skipped 1998 because of a lack of 64DD launch games to show, the tenth show was held on August 27–29, 1999. IGN explained that the 64DD's notoriously repeated launch delays were so significant, and the company's software library was so dependent upon the 64DD's launch, that this directly caused the skipping of Space World in 1998. The event had been delayed from 1998 to early 1999 and had been expected to slip again to November 1999.

The show was held at the Makuhari Messe convention center in Tokyo's Chiba prefecture. Long queues of 45–90 minutes were at each game demonstration kiosk. The Randnet dialup Internet service had recently been announced as currently in testing in Japan, to accompany the upcoming 64DD launch.

Many games for Nintendo 64 and Game Boy Color were announced and demonstrated, and Core Magazine said the Game Boy Color lineup reportedly attracted even more visitor traffic than the 64DD booth. Nintendo 64 Game Paks included Zelda Gaiden (later renamed Majora's Mask), Paper Mario, Mother 3, and Pokémon Gold and Silver. Nintendo's 64DD booth demonstrated eight launch games intended for later that year: Gendai Dai-Senryaku: Ultimate War, Kyojin no Doshin 1 (Doshin the Giant), F-Zero X Expansion Kit, Japanese Professional Golf, Mahjong School, SimCity, Talent Studio, and Paint Studio. IGN said that Ultimate War was one of the best games of the show, including "competitive network gaming via the Randnet service". Doshin the Giant's developer Kazutoshi Iida recalled a "continuous line of people queued to use the eight playable test units, and the 'Large Screen Experience'" with a very enthusiastic foreign press. A "captivated" audience of young children returned on each of the event's three days just to play Doshin. Mother 3 (EarthBound 64) was demonstrated for the first time, and the sudden announcement that it had been converted from 64DD disk to cartridge plus expansion disk was taken by IGN as bad news for the 64DD platform, having been seen as a crucial launch game for it. The half-complete Mother 3 was the favorite of Core Magazine staff, and the only demo with headphones, though with one basic story element. Nintendo's 64DD booth's display cases included the debut of the 64 GB Cable, a data transfer cable to connect Game Boy Color to 64DD with a prototype of the card trading game DT Bloodmasters. Many more 64DD games were reported in development. 64 Wars, also known as Advance Wars 64, was noninteractively demonstrated.

A detailed stage play was themed for Pokémon, with lively actors dressed in large, fuzzy costumes. Pokémon audio CDs were given to the audience.

=== Space World 2000 ===
The eleventh show was held on August 24–26, 2000. The major headline from the event was the dual-announcement of the Game Boy Advance handheld, which would go on sale in early 2001 and the GameCube home console, which would go on sale in late 2001. New games were also announced for the company's existing N64 and Game Boy devices. Also announced was the Mobile Adapter GB, a peripheral that would allowed the Game Boy Color and Game Boy Advance consoles to connect to a mobile phone, utilizing its cellular network for online interactions via the Mobile System GB service.

However one of the other major headlines was what was not discussed, the 64DD. After receiving considerable attention during prior shows, the add-on was completely absent. IGN humorously declared the 64DD "DeaDD" and noted its conspicuous omission:

Spaceworld delivered the unveiling of GameCube, the playability of Game Boy Advance and more than a dozen new Nintendo 64 games, but it also signified the official demise of the Nintendo's 64DD add-on device. The hardware was not only completely absent from the event, but previously scheduled products like Ultimate War and Doubutsu Banchou both showed up in playable form – on cartridge for Nintendo 64. Nintendo did not speak about 64DD during its opening speech, nor did the hardware itself have any booth presence. In fact, the unofficial "No 64DD!" policy seemed to be enforced by Nintendo so brutally that had we even muttered the name of the hardware, we would have probably been tossed out of the show.

— IGN

Newsweek noted that the competitive landscape had put Nintendo under pressure to shift focus from the Nintendo 64 and 64DD to a more advanced system like the GameCube, stating, "the gaming press had already witnessed [early pre-launch demonstrations of] the stunning graphics of 128-bit videogame systems like Sega's Dreamcast, Sony's PlayStation 2, and Microsoft's Xbox [so] when you're late to the party, you'd better be dressed to kill."

The show floor had an audience of 2,000, mostly male. Entertainment included "heavy artillery-loud techno music, smoke machines, and women in latex skirts". There was a huge screen at Nintendo's event stage, with two hours of next-generation presentation videos. A compilation trailer of Nintendo licenses running on GameCube hardware was displayed, including Derby Stallion, Luigi's Mansion, Metroid Prime, and Meowth's Party. Nintendo conducted the now legendary interactive technology demonstration called Super Mario 128 and played the brief video clip of The Legend of Zelda 128. Created with a realistic and gritty look to demonstrate the GameCube's power, the clip resonated with fans and commentators who hoped it previewed the next Zelda game. Newsweek said "There were 128 Marios bouncing around on an endlessly shifting landscape; a nightclub filled with rambunctious Pokémon; a Star Wars X-wing fighter leading a blazing assault on the Death Star—all so vividly rendered that they could have been stolen from a Pixar movie. And judging from the raucous response, the standing-room only crowd clearly felt that GameCube was well worth the wait."

The following two days included hands-on demonstrations of games such as Sin and Punishment, Mystery Dungeon, and Animal Forest for Nintendo 64, and Mario Kart Advance for the Game Boy Advance.

Nintendo's Game Boy Advance announcement included peripherals such as the Link cable, the GameCube – Game Boy Advance link cable, a rechargeable battery pack, and an infrared communications adapter which would allow systems to exchange data.

EarthBound 64 was one of the most anticipated games for the show, but had been canceled in an announcement just a few days prior on August 20, 2000. In early 2000, Miyamoto had declared hope of a debut demonstration of the four year old secret Cabbage prototype at this show, which did not happen and was never mentioned again.

=== Space World 2001 ===
The twelfth show was held on August 24–26, 2001 and was the last Space World consumer event. It featured the upcoming GameCube and recently released Game Boy Advance. A short clip of Super Mario Sunshine was shown in its early form.

Following the previous year's show, Nintendo presented a second demo clip of the upcoming The Legend of Zelda: The Wind Waker. Response was divided over the radically different cartoon-like art style created through cel shading. Some attendees enjoyed the new look, but there was backlash from disappointed fans who had hoped for a more photorealistic Zelda, like what was shown in the prior year's demo. Critics derisively dubbed the game "Celda". The game's producer, Shigeru Miyamoto, said he was surprised by the negative response.

=== Other events ===
From 2003 to 2006, Nintendo held the annual Nintendo Fusion Tour, featuring the announcement of the company's latest video games and a rock music venue.

Nintendo World 2006 showcased the Wii and Nintendo DS. Nintendo World 2011 was in Tokyo from January 8–10, 2011. At this exhibition, the company gave the specific details on the Japanese launch of the Nintendo 3DS.

The company has held many gameplay competition events such as Nintendo World Championships, Nintendo PowerFest '94, and Nintendo Campus Challenge. Nintendo has presented major releases and announcements by consistently participating with Electronic Entertainment Expo, and by creating its own online video event series Nintendo Direct.

== Legacy ==
Nintendo launched the Super Famicom, GameCube, Game Boy Advance, Nintendo 64, 64DD, and all the core games at the time within the Super Mario, The Legend of Zelda, and Pokémon franchises. Some events showed exclusive videos, playable previews, and live technology demos of video game materials, leaving fans and press to build hype and intrigue for years. Video game historians have mined remnants of papers, video clips, interviews, and software from the show's media corpus. This would be gleaned from trade press coverage at the time, revisited in celebrity developer interviews over the years, and from artifacts discovered in the world's secondary markets over the decades.

In 2014, collectors discovered a Super Mario 64 floppy disk for the 64DD from Shoshinkai 1996 in a thrift shop in Japan. The global community of video game historians analyzed the software's cosmetic idiosyncrasies, which resulted from its disposable nature as a late, improvised demonstration of the floppy drive prototype, just for that one show.

EarthBound 64 debuted at Shoshinkai 1996 with exclusive teaser videos and as a demonstration in 1999. These were the only experiences for the public at this trade show, as it was one of the most anticipated and unreleased games in Nintendo's history. In 2019, collectors discovered more video clips from the 1996 show, to be analyzed and canonized by EarthBound fandom.

Space World 2000's technology demonstration session started a legend of a demo called Super Mario 128. The tech demo helped build anticipation for the future GameCube console. Instead of becoming a real game, many pieces of its technology were utilized into various games such as Pikmin, Metroid Prime, and Super Mario Galaxy.
