= Starmie =

Pokémon species

- Pokémon character
- Starmie artwork by Ken Sugimori
- First game: Pokémon Red and Blue (1996)
- Designed by: Ken Sugimori (finalized)
- Voiced by: Rikako Aikawa

In-universe information
- Species: Pokémon
- Type: Water and Psychic

Starmie (/ˈstɑːrmiː/; Japanese: スターミー, Hepburn: Sutāmī) is a Pokémon species in Nintendo and Game Freak's Pokémon media franchise, and the evolved form of Staryu. First introduced in the video games Pokémon Red and Blue, it was designed by Ken Sugimori, and has appeared in multiple games in the series, including Pokémon Go and the Pokémon Trading Card Game.

Resembling two overlapped starfish with a jewel in its center, Starmie is classified as a Water- and Psychic-type Pokémon. In the franchise's fictional universe, Starmie is believed to have arrived from outer space and can transmit radio waves. A Starmie has been owned by the Gym Leader Misty in both the games and Pokémon: The Series; the latter is voiced by Rikako Aikawa. An additional form of Starmie, referred to as Mega Starmie, was introduced in the 2025 video game Pokémon Legends: Z-A.

Following its debut, Starmie received positive reception for its good stats and competitive abilities, going on to win multiple tournaments. The fight against Misty's Starmie also received discussion due to its function as an early game challenge. However, its Mega Evolution was more divisively received due to its design, becoming a meme within the Pokémon community.

== Concept and creation ==
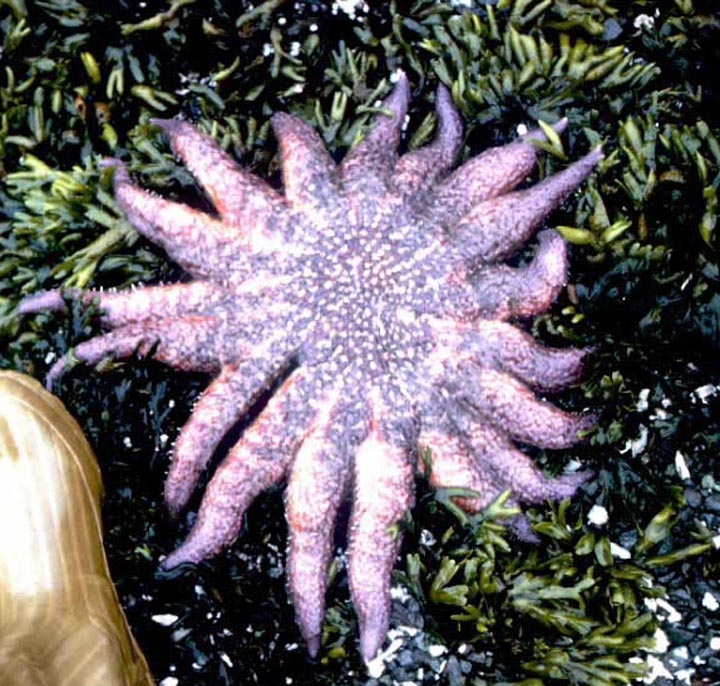
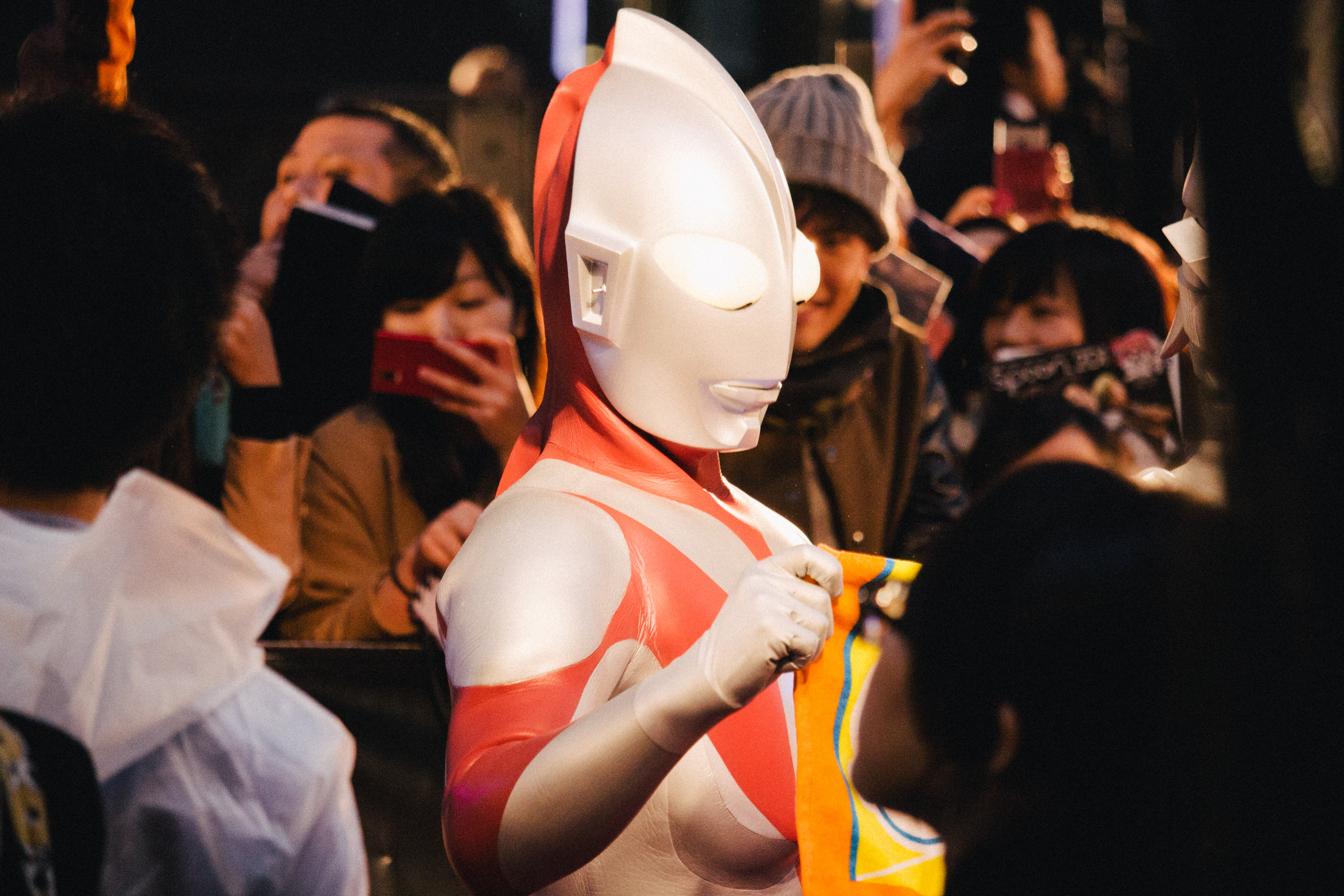
Starfish species such as the sunflower sea star (left), and the Japanese superhero Ultraman (right), are considered potential origins for Starmie's design

Starmie is a species of fictional creatures called Pokémon created for the Pokémon media franchise. Developed by Game Freak and published by Nintendo, the Japanese franchise began in 1996 with the video games Pokémon Red and Green for the Game Boy, which were later released in North America as Pokémon Red and Blue in 1998. In these games and their sequels, the player assumes the role of a Trainer whose goal is to capture and use the creatures' special abilities to combat other Pokémon. Some Pokémon can transform into stronger species through a process called evolution via various means, such as exposure to specific items. Each Pokémon has one or two elemental types, which define its advantages and disadvantages when battling other Pokémon. A major goal in each game is to complete the Pokédex, a comprehensive Pokémon encyclopedia, by capturing, evolving, and trading with other Trainers to obtain individuals from all Pokémon species.

Starmie evolves from the Pokémon Staryu when a "Water Stone" item is used on Staryu. Starmie is a purple starfish-like Pokémon with ten arms; its body resembles two starfish overlapped. Unlike most Pokémon, Starmie does not have a face, instead having a glowing red jewel at its center, which can glow in rainbow colors. Starmie's shiny form changes its body to a deep blue-purple and its jewel to cerulean with its barrier turning to red. Starmie, alongside its prior evolutionary stage, Staryu, are implied in-universe to be from outer space. At night, Starmie transmits radio waves into outer space. To move around, it lifts itself into the air and floats, although it has also been depicted walking. Starmie's English name is believed to be a play on words; in conjunction with its prior stage, Staryu, their names are a combination of "Starfish" or "Star", "You", and "Me". Both Staryu and Starmie are genderless. Its design is speculated to be based on the sunflower sea star, due to their shared similarities in color and large amount of arms. Starmie's jewel may be a reference to the Colour Timer from the Ultraman franchise. Starmie and Staryu's jewels start blinking when they are injured, similar to how Colour Timers indicate its user is running out of energy. The Ultraman reference is extended to their appearances in the Pokémon anime, where they communicate only using grunts instead of repeating their names, similar to how Ultras only grunt and shout during fights.

The 2025 game Pokémon Legends: Z-A introduced a temporary, in-battle transformation for Starmie known as Mega Starmie. Mega Starmie looks identical to Starmie, but grows two human-like legs, which it can use to run around. It also poses with its arms on its hips when standing. Its Mega Evolution gives it high speed and strong attacking stats. In the games' lore, Mega Starmie takes on this form due to attempting to resemble humans, though it is unclear if this is to replicate or to replace humanity. Its design is believed to also be inspired by the Japanese superhero Ultraman. In Pokémon Champions, Mega Starmie was updated to receive the ability "Huge Power", which doubles the power of physical moves in battles.

== Appearances ==
=== In video games ===
Starmie first appeared in the 1996 video game Pokémon Red and Green (Red and Blue outside of Japan); it is classified as a Water- and Psychic-type Pokémon and obtainable by evolving from Staryu using a Water Stone. Starmie appears in multiple games after, including the remakes FireRed and LeafGreen, and later Let's Go, Pikachu! and Let's Go, Eevee!. In the latter, the player can ride on Starmie around the games' overworld. It is typically only available through evolving from Staryu, though in some games, like Pokémon Black and White, it can be found in the wild. Starmie has occasionally been a version exclusive, meaning one would need to be trade to be seen in the opposite version; a naturally obtainable Starmie can only be found in Pokémon LeafGreen and Pokémon X. In Pokémon Ultra Sun and Ultra Moon, the player can witness an event in which a Starmie is having a staring contest against a Corsola and a Slowpoke. Starmie can lose the contest if the player uses a Pokémon that can tickle it, and in-return the player is rewarded. It was initially absent from Pokémon Sword and Shield until the release of the Isle of Armor DLC expansion pack. It was not included in Pokémon Legends: Arceus or Pokémon Scarlet and Violet. It was later featured in Pokémon Legends Z-A, receiving a new form called Mega Starmie that makes it more powerful.

In the first generation games and their remakes, Starmie is a Pokémon used by the Water-type Cerulean City Gym Leader Misty; it is considered her best Pokémon. Misty, alongside her Starmie, re-appear in Pokémon Gold and Silver and their remakes, Pokémon Crystal, and Pokémon Black 2 and White 2. In the mobile game Pokémon Masters EX, Misty, alongside her Starmie, are featured as a playable duo. Upon the release of Pokémon Champions, Starmie was chosen as one of the initial group of Pokémon available for use in the game.

Starmie can be seen in other spin-off Pokémon video games, including Pocket Monster Stadium, Pokémon Stadium, Pokémon Snap and its sequel New Pokémon Snap, Pokémon Pinball: Ruby and Sapphire, Pokémon Ranger, and the mobile game Pokémon Go. Starmie has appeared in the Pokémon Mystery Dungeon series, including a controllable Starmie found in the Sunken Treasure minigame in Gates to Infinity. In Pokémon: Magikarp Jump, the player can receive a decoration based on Starmie after winning the "Heal League". It has been featured in multiple card sets in the Pokémon Trading Card Game (TCG), with one later appearing in the mobile game Pokémon Trading Card Game Pocket. Mega Starmie would also be featured in the TCG, with its first card appearing in the set Mega Evolution–Perfect Order. In Super Smash Bros. for the Nintendo 64, players can summon various Pokémon from Poké Balls to fight for them, including Starmie.

=== In other media ===
Starmie appears in Pokémon: The Series, with one being featured on Misty's team since her introduction, who accompanies protagonist Ash Ketchum. Misty had trouble using her Starmie, oftentimes losing with it. Instead, she used it as a mode of transport. In the anime, Starmie is voiced by Japanese voice actress Rikako Aikawa. Mega Starmie made its debut appearance in the 121st episode of Pokémon Horizons: The Series. In the episode, it is owned by the character Friede and is referred to as "Instructor Starmie".

"First Prize for Starmie" is an entry in the Pokémon Tales board book series for children. Written by Kazuyuki Yamamoto, illustrated by Kagemaru Himeno and published by Viz Media, it tells the story of a group of Starmie that race each other across the galaxy, with one exploring the cosmos to get home for Christmas.

== Promotion and reception ==
Starmie has been featured on a number of merchandise, such as a plush, figurines, accessories, a pillow, painted shikishi [ja] (色紙), card sleeves, and clothing. During a collaboration between Pokémon Centers and Star Jewelry, a number of items were designed which featured Starmie on them. In Japan, a pokéfuta depicting Starmie was installed in an area of Toyohashi in July 2022. In 2016, to capture the rising popularity of Pokémon GO, an Auckland-based jeweller created a promotion in-which customers who have caught Starmie in-game would receive a free gemstone. According to a document leak published by WikiLeaks, a hacking program named after Starmie was allegedly developed by the CIA for the purpose of exploiting Android devices that use the operating system versions Android 4.0 to 4.3, such as the Samsung Galaxy Tab 2, the Galaxy Note and the Epic 4G Touch, to gain remote access in order to collect user data.

Starmie has received positive reception from both critics and fans, appearing in many best Pokémon rankings; Alex Lucard from the Beckett Pokémon Unofficial Collector magazine noting that its typing and ability to learn powerful attacks made it a well-rounded member of any team. Alex Olney, Jon Cartwright and Zion Grassl remarked during a video for Nintendo Life that it was an improvement over Staryu due to finding Starmie more intimidating. Inside Games' Suenaga praised Starmie's return in Sword and Shield's DLC, describing it as one of their favourite Pokémon from the first generation and being an ace at combat; Suenaga even ran a full team of shiny Starmie each with a different moveset. During a study published in the journal Language Arts, professor Vivian Maria Vasquez observed how players believed Starmie to be an enigma, citing its unthreatening appearance contradicting its ability to have some of the best moves in the games. Vasquez also noted how, despite being genderless, Starmie garnered a reputation for being a "girl's Pokémon" because of its appearance as a "starry jewel." Writing for Nintendo Life, Evan Lambert described Starmie as being a non-binary icon within the community due to its genderless status and color scheme being similar to the non-binary flag. Additionally, he noted Starmie was a subject of memes among fans due it making suggestive cries in the French dub of the Pokémon anime.

Critics commented on Starmie's role as an early game challenge in the first generation games as Misty's ace. Starmie's high speed stat and use of attacks such as Bubble Beam as reasons why many younger players had particular trouble beating it, with IGN describing Misty's Starmie as "an absolute pain" to fight. Critics noted that players that chose Charmander as their starter would have a harder time beating it compared to players that chose Bulbasaur, with some seeing this a way to teach players to catch more type effective Pokémon such as Oddish in order to beat it. Writing for Magmix, author Sootball saw the fight as an example how basic knowledge about Pokémon mechanics such as Technical Machines (TMs) and type matchups are essential during early game, noting that for younger players who brute force through the game with just strong move "Misty's Starmie will likely seem too strong, like a world champion."

=== Competitive play ===
Starmie gained particular attention for its combat abilities, where it was noted as both a strong and fast Pokémon among the selection during the earlier games in the series. Between 1997 and 1998, Starmie had been used to win official regional tournaments as well as the finals tournament "Nintendo Cup '97", prompting it to be banned alongside other Pokémon from use in "Nintendo Cup '99" following the addition of new rules to promote other Pokémon to have more exposure. As of 2024, Starmie is ranked in the top tier of competitive player for the first generation according to competitive Pokémon fan site Smogon. In IGN's "PokémonoftheDayChick" series of articles, Starmie was noted as being very versatile due to having a variety of different combat strategies for any situation in the first and second generations due to being able to learn many good offensive and defensive moves. When covering specific movesets for Starmie to use, the "DeathStar" moveset was brought up as being infamous within the Pokémon community, and described as being "nigh unparalleled if you're in the market for a world class annoyer" due to being able to both paralyse and confuse opponents. However, when it came to Starmie's physical design, the author found it hard to attach to due to its lack of a face. Futabanet's Honey similarly noted Starmie's moveset options, declaring it one of the best Pokémon to use in Red and Green. They continued that due to Starmie being able to learn the move "Blizzard", it alongside other Pokémon that could use the move such as Tauros were used abundantly at tournaments, causing Dragon-type Pokémon to become unable to be used at a competitive level due to their weakness to Ice-type moves. Writing for USA Today's For the Win website, Cian Maher described Starmie as one of the best designed Psychic-type Pokémon in the series due to it having impressive Speed and Special Attacks stats for its type. Maher further recalled the "DeathStar" strategy, referred to in the article as "Death Starmie", reminiscing that "it doesn't even need a Psychic move" to be considered the best of all Psychic-types. Conversely, Screen Rant's Scott Baird believed that Starmie and its pre-evolution were poorly designed in Gold and Silver, pointing out that they are programmed to learn moves that either do not work properly or cannot be obtained due to being genderless. Baird speculates that this was likely an oversight during development, noting that the programmed moves were likely a holdover from a previous in-development build that was leaked where the pair were originally gendered.

In Pokémon Trading Card Game Pocket, the "Starmie ex" card was seen as a strong card within the game's meta during the first few weeks. Often used in a deck alongside the Misty card and another Water-type Pokémon card, such as "Lapras ex" or "Articuno ex", the "Starmie ex" card was considered a powerful card due to its ability to be easily set up as well as being able to do high amounts of damage without using a lot of energy; outlets such as IGN, Nintendo Life and TheGamer listed the card as one of the strongest cards in the game, with the latter two noting it had little weakness outside of electric attacks. Starmie's card became quickly hated in the game's community due to believing it had too many strengths. The card would also be listed on websites such as eBay by players to be sold through the game's trading mechanic for in-game currency and lower-value cards, in what IGN described as a "strange [community ran] black market". By March 2025, Starmie's position had fallen slightly in the meta, with players speculating this to be due to lower health points and the introduction of more affordable Water-type Pokémon cards, however, the card is still considered to be a high tier.

=== Mega Evolution ===
Starmie's Mega Evolution form was the subject of discussion by critics and memes by fans

Mega Starmie's design received a mixed reception from both critics and Pokémon fans, with some fans supportive of the design and finding it funny and silly, whereas others believed it ruined Starmie's design and took over from Mega Dragonite as the worst Mega design in Z-A. TheGamer executive editor Rebecca Phillips believed Mega Starmie to be the best Mega form in Z-A, finding that part of its appeal came from evoking the uncanny valley and that its "bizarre, humanoid design gives it a little oomph." Conversely, writing for Polygon Giovanni Colantonio declared Mega Starmie to be Z-A's worst Mega form, describing it as a "body horror monstrosity" designed by David Cronenberg. Also writing for Polygon, Patricia Hernandez joked that Mega Starmie looked silly and "had the vibe of a meme or a shitpost", although commented it was quite strong due to its high stats. Kenneth Shepard, writing for Kotaku, felt that while the concept for Mega Starmie was interesting, the design was bland and could have had more done with it. Shepard felt it was too goofy and that it took away from Starmie's usual "elegant" vibe. In a later article for Kotaku, Shepard admitted that although he initially hated the design, Mega Starmie became a crucial part of his team during his playthrough because of its increased movement speed. Olivia Richman from The Escapist heavily criticized the design as being indicative of Game Freak being lazy and adding that people should feel bad for buying Z-A.

Additional commentary was made regarding Mega Starmie's walking animation. IGN's Tom Phillips praised the look of the animation, mentioning how it changed from "a more graceful roll to something out of a Saturday-morning cartoon." Commenting on Starmie's Pokédex entry mentioning its walk, Shepard found the different implications of what it could mean to be equally horrifying as either meaning Starmie was supplanting humanity or that it believes humanity walks around "like something out of a Hanna-Barbera cartoon," though noted the latter as a sort of burn to humans. Similarly, TheGamer's Josh Coulson wrote how he found Mega Starmie's ability to walk creepy, although he admitted the way it ran was amusing and as if the "Benny Hill theme" was playing whenever it ran. Richman questioned why the developers ignored its ability to float, calling the movement animations "stupid as hell" and that "Game Freak should feel bad."

Eurogamer's Connor Makar noted that Mega Starmie, compared to other new Mega Evolutions, had been discussed substantially more as a result of its appearance. Shepard reported that a week after Z-A's release and the design had received a "wave of backlash", players had begun to find the design endearing, commenting that it had "reached the "so bad its good" status". Following Mega Starmie's reveal, the Pokémon became the subject of memes and shitposts on social media. Online artists created fan art of the design to mock or to express support, such as by depicting Mega Starmie with buff legs; fan art was even created by the Spanish social media account of fast-food chain KFC. Its status as a meme was even alluded to by The Pokémon Company. On April Fools' Day 2026, The Official Pokémon YouTube channel broadcast a 10-hour livestream of Mega Starmie running through a psychedelic environment with upbeat music playing in the background, with Tea Pudding from Inside Games attributing the livestream as a promotion of the Mega Starmie ex trading card.

Other artists used the opportunity to create alternate designs of Starmie's mega form, in particular leaning into the space aspect of Starmie, with journalists such as Richman and Coulson thinking they were an improvement over the original and were disappointed the fans design could not become a reality. In Japan, fans made art of the creature running or wearing stockings, or by comparing / fusing Starmie with the demons Decarabia and Kaiwan from the Persona and Shin Megami Tensei series. Additional fan art was created following its appearance in Pokemon Champions, where artists depicted it as being extremely muscular or gorilla-like. This was due to Mega Starmie's change in the game from focusing on using psychokinetic special attacks and instead using physical attacks, with commentors on social media joking that it had become "muscle-brained". Both journalists and fans commonly compared its design to a scene in The SpongeBob SquarePants Movie, in which Patrick Star is depicted with long legs and in fishnet leggings. Fans have also compared the design to the Starmen from EarthBound, Starro from DC Comics and Starman from the Kirby series. Shepard believed that Mega Starmie's legs made it "easy to graft onto just about anything." According to Evan Lambert, Mega Starmie had earned a queer icon status online, with queer cosplayers and drag queens dressing up as and designing outfits based on it, as well as being used in memes referencing movies such as The Devil Wears Prada. Lambert described Mega Starmie as a "symbol of resistance" due to it becoming a breakout star despite it initially being rejected by society.

Outside of the main series, the "Mega Starmie ex" card saw significant use in TCG tournaments in Japan. Following its release in the Japanese Nihil Zero booster set in January 2026, the card had become a staple in many player's sets due to its high damage attack and large amount of health points, making it useful by itself as well as in-combination with other cards. Matt Bassil of Wargamer noted that these aspects allowed the card to deal with other top tiers, resulting in the card being used to win competitions as well as reach many second and third-place finishes.
