= Delibird =

Pokémon species

- Pokémon character
- Delibird artwork by Ken Sugimori
- First game: Pokémon Gold and Silver (1999)
- Designed by: Ken Sugimori (finalized)
- Voiced by: EN: SungWon Cho; JA: Katsuyuki Konishi

In-universe information
- Species: Pokémon
- Type: Ice and Flying

Delibird (/ˈdɛliˌbɜːrd/; Japanese: デリバード, Hepburn: Deribādo) is a Pokémon species in Nintendo and Game Freak's Pokémon franchise. Delibird first appeared in the video games Pokémon Gold and Silver and most of its subsequent sequels. Designed by Game Freak's development team and finalized by Ken Sugimori, it has also appeared in various spin-off titles, such as Pokémon Go and Pokémon Stadium 2, and animated adaptations of the franchise. Delibird is a penguin-like, Santa Claus-inspired Pokémon with a tail that resembles a sack. In the Pokémon anime, Delibird has been voiced by SungWon Cho and Katsuyuki Konishi for the English and Japanese dubs, respectively.

Following its debut, Delibird had a mixed reception. Its weakness in battle, owed partially to the unreliability of its "Present" move, was universally criticized. Reactions to its design were more split, with some believing Delibird to have an endearing appearance, while others described its appearance as off-putting and criticized its sack-like tail as an odd design choice. Iron Bundle, a robotic Pokémon directly inspired by Delibird, became well known for its high level of combat power, dwarfing its inspiration.

== Conception and design ==
Delibird is a species of fictional creatures called Pokémon created for the Pokémon media franchise. Developed by Game Freak and published by Nintendo, the Japanese franchise began in 1996 with the video games Pokémon Red and Green for the Game Boy, which were later released in North America as Pokémon Red and Blue in 1998. In these games and their sequels, the player assumes the role of a Trainer whose goal is to capture and use the creatures' special abilities to combat other Pokémon. Some Pokémon can transform into stronger species through evolution via various means, such as exposure to specific items. Each Pokémon has one or two elemental types, which define its advantages and disadvantages when battling other Pokémon. A major goal in each game is to complete the Pokédex, a comprehensive Pokémon encyclopedia, by capturing, evolving, and trading with other Trainers to obtain individuals from all Pokémon species.

Delibird was first introduced in Pokémon Gold and Silver. When developing the games, around 300 individual Pokémon designs were drafted by various development team members, with each deciding their names and features and revising the drafts as needed. During this process, the team actively tried to avoid vague design concepts, as they felt this had caused difficulty creating completed Pokémon during the development of Red and Blue. As the team selected which Pokémon would be included, they were drawn and finalized by lead artist Ken Sugimori. To maintain balance, however, many of the newer species did not appear in the early stages of the game. Additionally, many of the Pokémon were designed with merchandise in mind, taking into account the related Pokémon toy line and anime series. As a result designs often had to be kept simplistic, something that caused strain for Sugimori and affected his approach to the next Pokémon franchise titles, Pokémon Ruby and Sapphire.

Delibird is a red and white penguin Pokémon with a tail resembling a gift sack, standing at 2 feet 11 inches (90 cm) tall. Described as the "Delivery Pokémon", it likes to deliver letters and presents that it stores in its tail across the Pokémon world. Delibird are also capable of flight, despite penguins being flightless birds. They also like to store food in their tails, which Delibird hand out to travelers who they believe are lost. They prefer colder climates, nesting on the edge of sharp cliffs, although they can withstand significantly warmer locations. Due to its colour scheme, sack-like tail and gift delivery, Delibird is likely inspired by Santa Claus. Its name is a combination of "delivery" and "bird". On its own, Delibird is capable of learning two moves naturally. One of these is its signature move, Present. (Note: Delibird was the only Pokémon capable of learning this move until the ninth generation, where the Pokémon Iron Bundle was also able to learn this move.) When in battle, using this move leads to Delibird pulling out a present and lobbing it at an opponent, dealing a light, medium or heavy amount of damage at random. Sometimes, this move is capable of healing the opponent rather than dealing damage to them.

The scrapped design for the Delibird evolution discovered and partially reconstructed by archivists in 2026

An unused evolution for Delibird was designed during the early development of Pokémon Diamond and Pearl. This design was gnome-like whilst also amplifying the Santa aspects of the original design. The scrapped evolution was discovered in July 2026 after archivists published a DVD onto the Internet Archive pertaining to an internal Game Freak documentary on the development of Diamond and Pearl.

== Appearances ==
Delibird made their debut appearance in the Pokémon series as one of one hundred new Pokémon added in the 1999 video game Pokémon Gold and Silver, as well as the enhanced version Pokémon Crystal, which is set in the Johto region. It is classified as an Ice- and Flying-type Pokémon with only one stage, meaning it has no pre-evolutions and is not known to evolve. They have since gone on to appear in several games in the series such as Pokémon X and Y, Pokémon Sun and Moon, Pokémon Sword and Shield, and Pokémon Legends: Z-A. A Paradox Pokémon heavily resembling Delibird appears in Pokémon Scarlet and Violet. Iron Bundle is a robotic version of Delibird holding a water cannon instead of a sack. In the same game, a series of shops are spread across the Paldea region called "Delibird Presents", which specializes in selling items for battles and merchandise.

Delibird has appeared in various spin-off video games. Pokémon Stadium 2 features a minigame called "Delibird's Delivery", where each player controls a Delibird that must collect and deliver presents. It was introduced to Pokémon Go in December 2017, with the Pokémon only reappearing in exclusive holiday events. It has also made appearances in New Pokémon Snap, Pokémon Masters EX, and Pokémon Sleep. Delibird has also made multiple appearances in other Pokémon-related media; appearing in the Pokémon Trading Card Game, multiple episodes of the Pokémon anime, in one of many shorts from the Pichu & Pikachu's Winter Vacation 2001 collection, as well as in Pokémon the Movie: The Power of Us. In the anime it is voiced by Katsuyuki Konishi in Japanese, and in English by SungWon Cho.

== Reception ==
Media outlets negatively compared Iron Bundle (left) to Delibird (right), feeling its strengths only emphasized the weaknesses of the latter

Delibird has received a generally negative reception. Robert Grosso from TechRaptor, stated "It's hard to find a starting point as to why Delibird simply fails as a design", finding the character's core appearance of a penguin combined with Santa Claus imagery to be "off putting". Moreso however he criticized how it appeared to be built around the singular Present move, and that attack's randomness combined with its unreliability further hampered Delibird even in casual gameplay, making it "a poor Pokémon on all fronts". Devin Ellis Friend, writing for Screen Rant, called Delibird "a complete joke" since its introduction, attributing it to its lack of an evolution and how its typing weaknesses made the Pokémon "one of the worst single-stage Pokémon in the series". Daniel Dockery of Crunchyroll News described Delibird as being "useful almost none of the time" for situations involving attacking opponents. He recalled an experience from a childhood playthrough of Pokémon Crystal where he found Delibird during a hunt for Ice-type Pokémon in order to resist a Dragon-type user, becoming confused to find that Delibird's only form of attacking was completely randomized. While describing it as a "cute Santa penguin", GamesRadar+'s Jordan Gerblick nevertheless asserted that Delibird was "the butt of the joke in the Pokémon community". He was surprised that Iron Bundle, a robotic Pokémon based directly on Delibird, was so much stronger than the original that it had been banned from several fan-made competitive Pokémon battling scenes such as Smogon. Friend similarly commented on the contrast between Delibird and Iron Bundle, describing the power gap as "almost comical in its scale".

Conversely, Screen Rant's Jack O'Keeffe described Delibird as "the gambler's Pokémon". He believed that Present's random nature made the Pokémon a fun addition to a player's team and that it could add "drama and suspense" to more boring Pokémon battles. TheGamer's Joshua Robertson expressed sadness at the community overlooking Delibird, stating that it went against the Pokémon's purpose to spread cheer for Christmas. Kayleigh Partleton, in an article for Pocket Tactics, praised Delibird for its cute design an caring nature, rhetorically asking "Who doesn't love Delibird?" Eva Padilla of RPGFan commented on their podcast how unusual and "strange" Delibird was due to its abilities and how much it stood out amongst the game's roster as a result. She attributed that such characters were bound to be made in casts as large as Pokémon's, to which the other website staff agreed. In an article for Kotaku, Gita Robinson reported on a player who found a creative use for Delibird in one of the series' recurring minigames, finding that due to its design and gameplay, it was inherently well adapted for such events compared to battling.

Due to the tail's design, it has often led many in the Pokémon community to believe it was just a sack separate from its body, with some exclaiming it took them years to correct the misconception. Robertson called it a "cute little penguin", but TheGamer's Editor in Chief, Stacey Henley, expressed disgust at the design of Delibird's sack like-tail. She commented on Delibird's nature of storing food in its tail and handing it out to passers-by, describing the act as gross. Additionally, she noted on the fact that Delibird often creates the presents it hands out to people from its tail, calling this aspect weird and equating the presents to its droppings. Henley was also particularly critical of Delibird's overall design. She felt that because Delibird is based on penguins, it should not be described as a Christmas Pokémon, denying Delibird the title outright. Instead of Delibird, she chose Pokémon Stantler and Fletchling; Pokémon based on reindeers and robins respectively, which she claims are animals more commonly associated with Christmas.

Starting in 2013, following the release of Pokémon X and Y, a community of Pokémon players founded Operation Delibird, a campaign where they would trade rare Pokémon to others on Christmas and Boxing Day. The campaign was created to fight back against negativity in the community as well as a previously similar troll campaign involving the Pokémon Zubat. The decision to choose Delibird as the face of the campaign was due to its association with Christmas and giving gifts to others.

In 2020, a collaborative marketing campaign between The Pokémon Company and Japanese food delivery service menu, called "Pokémon Delivery", was introduced and featured Delibird as its mascot due to its association with delivering gifts.
