= Tsunekazu Ishihara =

President of The Pokémon Company

- Born: November 27, 1957 (age 68); Toba, Japan
- Education: University of Tsukuba
- Occupation: Game producer
- Years active: 1991–present
- Employer(s): Ape Inc. (1991–1995); Creatures Inc. (1995–2023); The Pokémon Company (1998–present)
- Known for: EarthBound; Pokémon

Tsunekazu Ishihara (Japanese: 石原 恒和, Hepburn: Ishihara Tsunekazu; born November 27, 1957) is a Japanese video game designer, director, producer and businessman who is the president and Chief executive officer of The Pokémon Company.

Prior to working with the Pokémon franchise, Ishihara was part of Ape Inc. and worked on titles such as EarthBound, and then years later he founded Creatures Inc.

Ishihara's work with Pokémon, in which he was involved since early development stages during the 1990s, had him as a producer from Creatures while he also heavily focused on licensed and spin-off products such as the Pokémon Trading Card Game, with him founding The Pokémon Company to handle such business activities. He was also crucial in the development of Pokémon Go, having supported the concept of a location-based Pokémon game.

== Career ==
Ishihara was born on November 27, 1957, in the city of Toba. In 1983, he completed a Master's in Art and Design at the University of Tsukuba. After his graduation, he joined Ape Inc. in 1991, where he worked in the development of various video games, among others Mario & Wario (1993), and EarthBound (1994). In 1995, after leaving Ape Inc., Ishihara founded the development company Creatures Inc., with assistance from Satoru Iwata.

=== Pokémon ===
When the planning and development for the Pokémon series began in 1990, Ishihara worked with Game Freak as a producer at Creatures to develop the Red and Green titles, at one point with Creatures providing a cash infusion during the company's financial difficulty to help them in the development of the game. Following the title's release, Ishihara founded the Pokémon Center Company—today The Pokémon Company—and became its Representative Director.

Before Red and Green's release, Ishihara initiated the development of the Pokémon Trading Card Game. In an interview, Satoru Iwata noted that people involved with Creatures Inc. would refer to Ishihara as "The King Of Portable Toys" due to Ishihara's extensive involvement on licensed Pokémon products—including the trading cards, anime, and movie; according to Ishihara, his involvement and focus on the licensed products was to ensure that the next titles in the series—which he was again involved in—were successful.

Ishihara stated that he had initially expected Gold and Silver to be his final Pokémon games intending to leave the series after the two games were finalised; however, following their success, increased requests for licensed Pokémon products prompted a joint venture between Nintendo, Game Freak and Creatures Inc. to establish The Pokémon Company in 2000, which was meant to take licensing and brand management tasks away from Game Freak, which was to focus on working on the next titles. Ishihara was then placed as president and CEO of the new company. During the development of FireRed and LeafGreen, Ishihara and Iwata convinced Game Freak to use the Wireless Adapter for trading in the games, instead of trading Pokémon through cables like in previous titles. Ishihara was also involved with the tie-in "Pokéwalker" in HeartGold and SoulSilver.

In 2014, following an April Fools prank on Google Maps involving users "catching" Pokémon on the app, Ishihara began to negotiate licensing of Pokémon characters for an augmented reality game with Niantic Labs. Ishihara had been an avid player of Niantic's Ingress title, and he endorsed the planned game—which secured support from Iwata. Upon its release in 2016, the title Pokémon Go was considered a massive success, with Ishihara referring to its cultural impact as a "Pokédemic", comparing it to the peak popularity of Pokémon in the late 1990s.

During an interview with Bloomberg, Ishihara noted that he was initially skeptical of the Nintendo Switch's success, doubting the prospects of a video game console with the abundance of smartphones. Despite this, they naturally started development on several Nintendo Switch games as a Nintendo affiliate. Later, in 2019, Ishihara announced the title Pokémon Sleep slated for a 2020 release, which he stated was to make "players to look forward to waking up every morning".

In April 2023, Ishihara stepped down as CEO of Creatures Inc., a position he held for decades while still working at The Pokémon Company as its president and CEO. Ishihara continues to serve as President of The Pokémon Company.

== Works ==
=== Video games ===
| Year | Title | Role |
|---|---|---|
| 1990 | Knight Move | Producer |
| 1991 | Yoshi | Producer |
| 1991 | Tetris 2 + Bombliss | Producer, puzzle problem creator |
| 1992 | Super Tetris 2 + Bombliss | Bombliss supervisor, puzzle problem creator |
| 1993 | Monopoly (Super Famicom) | Director |
| 1993 | Sanrio World Smash Ball! | Director |
| 1993 | Mario & Wario | Producer |
| 1994 | EarthBound | Line producer, special effects artist |
| 1995 | Mario's Picross | Director |
| 1995 | The Monopoly Game 2 | Project manager |
| 1995 | Tetris Blast | Supervisor |
| 1995 | Mario's Super Picross | Director, screen graphic designer |
| 1996 | Pokémon Red and Blue | Producer |
| 1996 | Picross 2 | Director |
| 1998 | Pocket Monsters' Stadium | Producer |
| 1998 | Pokémon Yellow | Producer |
| 1998 | Hey You, Pikachu! | Producer |
| 1998 | Pokémon Trading Card Game | Producer |
| 1999 | Pokémon Snap | Producer |
| 1999 | Pokémon Pinball | Producer |
| 1999 | Pokémon Stadium | Producer |
| 1999 | Pokémon Gold and Silver | Producer |
| 1999 | Custom Robo | Producer |
| 1999 | Doshin the Giant | Executive producer |
| 2000 | Pokémon Puzzle Challenge | Producer |
| 2000 | Pokémon Puzzle League | Licensing supervisor |
| 2000 | Custom Robo V2 | Supervisor |
| 2000 | Pokémon Crystal | Producer |
| 2000 | Pokémon Stadium 2 | Producer |
| 2001 | Pokémon Card GB2: Great Rocket-Dan Sanjō! | Producer |

=== Other ===
| Year | Title | Role |
|---|---|---|
| 1997–present | Pokémon the Series | Production supervisor |
| 2019 | Pokémon Detective Pikachu | Executive producer |

== Awards ==
- CEDEC Awards 2011 – Special Award.
- Minister of Economy, Trade and Industry Award 2011.
- Japan Innovators Award 2016 – Soft Power Award (along with John Hanke).
