= Pokémon Stadium =

1999 video game

- North American box art featuring Blastoise (left) and Charizard (right)
- Developer: Nintendo EAD
- Publisher: Nintendo
- Director: Takao Shimizu
- Producers: Kenji Miki; Tsunekazu Ishihara; Satoru Iwata; Shigeru Miyamoto
- Composers: Kenta Nagata; Hajime Wakai; Toru Minegishi
- Series: Pokémon
- Platform: Nintendo 64
- Release: JP: April 30, 1999; NA: March 6, 2000; AU: March 23, 2000; EU: April 7, 2000
- Genre: Turn-based strategy
- Modes: Single-player, multiplayer

Pokémon Stadium, known as Pokémon Stadium 2 (Note: Japanese: ポケモンスタジアム2, Hepburn: Pokemon Sutajiamu 2) in Japan, is a 1999 strategy video game developed and published by Nintendo for the Nintendo 64. The gameplay revolves around a 3D turn-based battling system using the 151 Pokémon from the Game Boy games Pokémon Red, Blue, and Yellow, with several in-game challenges for players to overcome. The game includes four "Cups", each of which is a series of three-on-three Pokémon battles against an ordered lineup of opponents. The "Gym Leader Castle" mode involves battles against several boss opponents who appeared in the Game Boy games. Pokémon Stadium also features mini-games and numerous features available through its compatibility with Pokémon Red, Blue, and Yellow. Using the Transfer Pak accessory that was bundled with the game, players are able to view, organize, store, trade, and battle using Pokémon uploaded from Pokémon Red, Blue, and Yellow.

It was the first Stadium title released in Western regions, succeeding the Japan-only 1998 Nintendo 64 release Pocket Monsters Stadium. Pokémon Stadium was released in Japan in 1999, before being released in Australia, Europe and North America in 2000. Pokémon Stadium became one of the best-selling Nintendo 64 titles, selling one million copies before the end of the year. Critics praised the game's visuals and the connectivity with the Game Boy games but criticized the games' audio quality and repetitive gameplay. A sequel, Pokémon Stadium 2, released in 2000, supporting connectivity with the games Pokémon Gold, Silver, and Crystal. Stadium was re-released on the Nintendo Classics service on April 12, 2023.

== Gameplay ==
Unlike the previous games in the series, Pokémon Red, Blue, and Yellow, Pokémon Stadium does not have storyline-driven gameplay. Stadium takes a more battle-focused approach with its gameplay, which functions similarly to Red, Blue, and Yellow. Players select teams of six Pokémon to battle. These are either Pokémon collected from Pokemon Red, Blue, Yellow usable via the Nintendo 64 Transfer Pak, or Pokémon with pre-determined movesets included in Pokemon Stadium. Six Pokémon are chosen as the party. Only three of them can be chosen for individual battles. Pokémon are depicted in 3D and have unique animations in-battle. The game also features an announcer, who says voice lines in response to actions that occur in battle.

The game challenges the player to succeed in trainer battles at the Stadium, a tournament consisting of four in-game tournaments that last eighty battles in total, with each tournament having its own rules and restrictions. Another mode, the Gym Leader Castle, has the player battle the eight Kanto Gym Leaders, the Kanto Elite Four, and the Champion, who previously appeared in the Game Boy games. Defeating the mode allows players to obtain rare species of Pokémon. When all Cups have been won and the Gym Leader Castle is completed, a six-on-one battle against Mewtwo is unlocked. Defeating Mewtwo unlocks another round of Stadium, Gym Leader Castle, and the Mewtwo battle, but with higher difficulty.

=== Other features ===
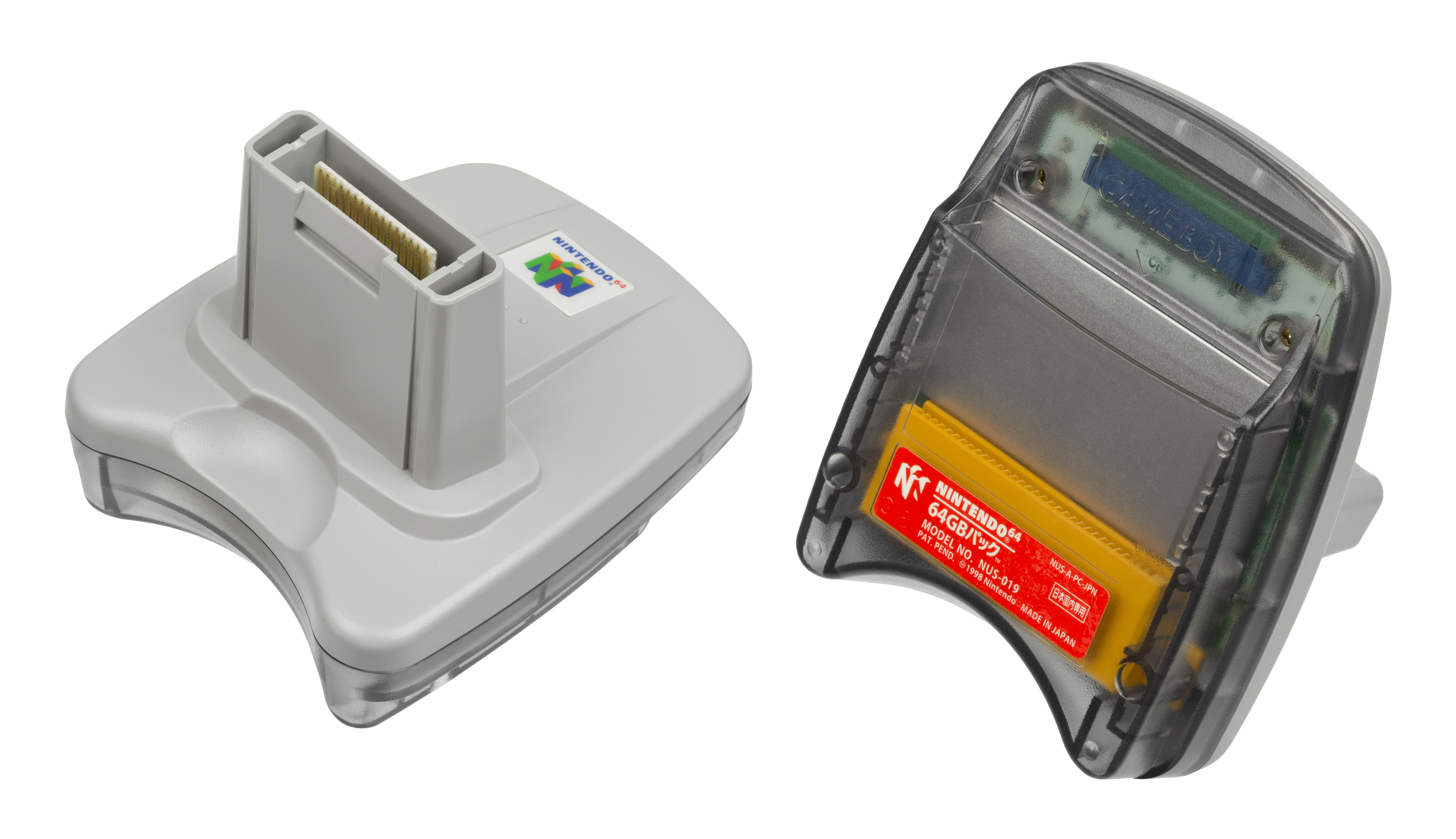
A Nintendo 64 Transfer Pak, used to send data from Pokémon Red, Blue, and Yellow to Pokémon Stadium

Pokémon Stadium features other game-modes. The Pokémon Lab feature allows players to connect with Pokémon Game Boy game cartridges via the Nintendo 64 Transfer Pak. A player's stored Game Boy Pokémon can be organized and traded in the Lab, and players can view Pokedex information and models for particular species. Players can store Pokémon and items from the Game Boy games in Stadium, and allows players to transfer Pokémon stored on Pokémon Red, Blue, and Yellow Game Boy cartridges to Stadium, where they can be used in Stadium's battle modes. Players can play the Game Boy games through Stadium via the connection. The Lab also allows players to receive Pokémon species as gifts, with the species available being species obtainable only as part of a one-time choice in the Game Boy games, allowing for players to more easily complete their Pokedex in the Game Boy games.

The Kids Club feature allows players to play mini-games, which deviate from standard gameplay to Mario Party-styled mini-games. Nine mini-games are included in Pokémon Stadium, and each game allows up to four players, who all play as Pokémon. If any of the four player slots are not taken, the CPU takes over the excess slots. There are a large variety of games, such as a game based on Simon Says featuring Clefairy, and a game based on ring toss featuring Ekans.

== Development ==
Pokémon Stadium was developed by Nintendo EAD. Producer Shigeru Miyamoto explained in 1997 that Nintendo EAD was then a group of 20 to 30 staff each devoted to every title. Within EAD, a programming group called SRD involved a separate company of about 200 people working exclusively for Nintendo. Nintendo EAD had previously produced Pocket Monsters Stadium, the prior entry in the series. Pocket Monsters Stadium was initially set for release on the cancelled 64DD console and was planned to feature every Pokémon from the Game Boy games. This number was reduced to 40 during development and eventually released on cartridge for the Nintendo 64.

Pokémon Stadium was initially released in Japan as Pokémon Stadium 2, acting as a sequel and expansion to the Japan-exclusive Pocket Monsters Stadium. Unlike the prior release, Stadium allowed the usage of all 151 species of Pokémon instead of the limited pool of 40 used prior, and greatly expanded on various different gameplay features that were in the prior game. For the US releases of Pokémon Stadium, the Gallery mode was included, Pikachu's voice was altered, and changes were made to the tournaments used in the game. In the international releases of the game, the in-game announcer is portrayed by Ted Lewis, while Pikachu is portrayed by Ikue Ōtani.

== Release and promotion ==
=== Japan ===
Pokémon Stadium was announced in the December 1998 issue of the Japanese magazine The 64Dream. In March and April, Nintendo held a tournament involving the game as part of the Pokemon Festival '99, an event to promote Stadium, Pokémon Snap (1999) and Pokémon Pinball (1999).

Pokémon Stadium was released to retail on April 30, 1999, for the Nintendo 64. Nintendo Official Magazine reported in July 1999 that Pokemon Stadium was the number one best-selling game in Japan, followed by Pokemon Pinball in second place. The magazine commented that it had been "a long time since Nintendo featured so well in Japanese charts. That's the power of Pokémon." It was the 10th best-selling video game of the year in Japan by August 1999. Nintendo reported to have sold 1,370,000 copies of the game by December 1999 in the region.

=== Outside Japan ===
Sales for the Nintendo 64 console fell 12.5% in the United States in the year prior to the release of Pokémon Stadium, with Enrique Rivero of Video Business describing sales as being "softer-than-expected". The report stated that this was largely due to consumers purchasing Pokémon games for the Game Boy instead. Nintendo's Pokémon franchise was at a high point of popularity in the United States by late 1999, with the franchise having a high-selling VHS tape, top-viewed kids television show, and over seven million Pokémon game cartridges sold.

On March 6, 2000, Nintendo launched a $7 million Pokémon Stadium advertising campaign on television, print, and online media as part of a wider $30 million Pokémon promotion. Nintendo released a promotional Pokémon Stadium bundle featuring a Nintendo 64 console, two differently colored Nintendo 64 controllers, a poster, a journal, and a "Cool Porygon" promo card for the trading card game.

Nintendo of America promoted the game through a national tour between March 11 and April 9 titled the Pokémon 2000 Stadium Tour, allowing them play Pokémon Stadium. Nintendo embarked on its first online marketing push for the franchise specifically for the United Kingdom, launching an official Pokémon Stadium website specifically for a UK audience.

In celebration of the game's North American release, Nintendo and Blockbuster partnered for a promotion in which the first Pokémon Stadium game cartridges delivered to Blockbuster contained a coupon for a limited-edition Pokémon Stadium sticker poster and a free "Pokémon Smart Card", which could be used to redeem up to sixteen stickers at Blockbuster locations. The Smart Cards were previously available in Blockbuster's 1999 promotion for Pokémon Snap.

The game was released in the United States on March 6 and in Europe on April 7, 2000. It sold over 100,000 in the United Kingdom. By April, Nintendo of America announced that Pokémon Stadium sold over 1 million copies. It became the best-selling console game in the region during the year 2000. Anne Sherber of Supermarket News wrote that Nintendo had the biggest share of the American console video game market in 2000, with sales of the Nintendo 64 being driven by the release of Pokémon Stadium. Games magazine reporting that 12% of video games sold in 2000 were Pokemon-related titles. A Nintendo representative posited that the sales were due to their new series of N64 featuring translucent case colors, while Quang Hong of Gamasutra inferred sale may have been due to Pokémon Stadium release.

Nintendo of America announced that it would be released as a Player's Choice title, a well-selling game with a lower suggested retail price, on December 26, 2000. At least more than 3.97 million copies have been sold, including 3.16 million in the United States, 710,765 in Japan, and more than 100,000 in the United Kingdom. The book Pikachu's Global Adventure: The Rise and Fall of Pokemon stated that the while the game's innovative features helped elevate it to a level of success, Stadium was unable to replicate the success of the Game Boy games before it.

== Reception ==
Reception

Aggregate score
Aggregator	Score
GameRankings	78.60%

Review scores
Publication	Score
Famitsu	9/10, 8/10, 8/10, 8/10
GameFan	89/100
GameRevolution	6/10
GameSpot	5.7/10
IGN	8.2/10
Nintendo Power	8.8/10
RPGamer	5/10

Pokémon Stadium received mostly positive reviews from critics, attaining a score of 78.60% on review aggregator GameRankings based on 26 reviews. The connectivity features between Pokémon Stadium and Pokémon Red, Blue, and Yellow were considered highlights of the game, with GameSpot writer Jeff Gerstmann stating it to be the game's "main hook". IGN writer Peer Schneider felt that the main appeal was seeing Pokémon in 3D, and highlighted other features, such as being able to play the Game Boy games on a television, but elaborated that, without Pokémon transferred from the Game Boy games, the battles felt meaningless to him. Game Revolution staff also felt the reliance on Game Boy features made battles feel more hollow, as otherwise players were forced to rely on unreliable rental Pokémon. RPGamer writer Ben Martin was critical of the game for similar reasons, criticizing the game as being an "add-on" to the Game Boy games.

Game Revolution staff believed that the game expanded upon the competitive mechanics of the main series games, but also felt that the gameplay quickly became repetitive. They felt that players would lose interest unless they played Pokémon series games "religiously". Martin felt that while it was easy to understand for young players, the lack of a plot or significant goal made battles quickly lose meaning. The mini-games received negative reception from critics such as Gerstmann and Schneider, who found them too simple, with Gerstmann comparing them negatively to the mini-games in the Mario Party series, while Schneider felt some games were better than others. Game Revolution staff were more positive, stating that they the games were fun despite their simplicity. Martin enjoyed the mini-games, but felt that they were too limited, wishing that the mini-games present could be customized and for further mini-games beyond the available selection.

The player's Dragonite faces off against the opponent's Parasect. GameSpot writer Jeff Gerstmann complimented the models in the game, but said the background visuals were "lackluster".

The visuals were praised by critics; Gerstmann felt they were a step up from the models used in Pokémon Snap, though noted that the animations were a "little drab" due to the animations being limited to performing their attacks and reacting to attacks, wishing that they would have had physical contact between the two Pokémon. Despite this misgiving, he felt the attack effects were well done. Despite finding the background visuals lackluster, Schneider enjoyed the Pokémon models, appreciating how closely they resembled their anime counterparts and how Pokémon species' size differences were illustrated. GameFan and Nintendo Power also highlighted the quality of the visual effects. Reviewers in Famitsu complimented the game's animations, particularly for its characters. One reviewer stated that while they thought all the worthwhile to use Pokémon were in the first game, seeing the animations of all 151 of them in Stadium was a joy to behold.

The audio received negative reception from contemporary critics. Gerstmann felt that the game would have benefited from using the Pokémon voices from the anime series, and criticized the announcer for being too repetitive. He also criticized the sound, stating that due to being at a low frequency scale, it sounded "tinny and muffled." Schneider was disappointed by the sound, having been initially excited due to Factor 5's involvement, only to realize that they were just involved for voice compression for the announcer, whom he found repetitive and annoying. Like Gerstmann, he bemoaned the use of Game Boy Pokémon cries instead of anime cries, as well as the music quality. Game Revolution staff felt it would not have been hard to reproduce the anime Pokémon cries, but appreciated being able to turn the announcer off. Nintendo Power staff felt that the announcer was repetitive, calling the music and sound effects "nothing special." Martin found the music forgettable, and also disliked the announcer, criticizing how repetitive and limited his dialogue was and appreciating that he could disable it.

Inverse writer David Grossman felt that the Nintendo Switch re-release was a "total nostalgia bomb," stating that the novelty had worn off due to 3D battles being the norm, but still enjoyed playing it again. While he noted that contemporary critics found the announcer annoying, he appreciated how hearing the voice brought him back to his childhood. Despite this, he criticized it for lacking several Game Boy compatibility features. Nintendo Life writers Arjun Joshi and Alana Hagues were mixed on this release; Joshi felt hard-pressed to recommend it due to the lack of Transfer Pak support, but still felt that, if a person was an "OG fan," there would be something to enjoy with it. Hagues, meanwhile, found it strange that they brought it to Nintendo Switch without the Game Boy features, saying that requiring only rental Pokémon made it more challenging but not more fun. Both believed that it was a nostalgic game, appreciating the announcer and mini-games in particular.

During the 4th Annual Interactive Achievement Awards, Pokémon Stadium received a nomination for the "Console Family" award by the Academy of Interactive Arts & Sciences.

== Sequel and legacy ==
Months after its debut, a follow-up to Pokémon Stadium, tentatively titled Pokémon Stadium Gold/Silver, was announced by Nintendo. The game was released in 2000 as Pokémon Stadium 2, featuring every Pokémon from Stadium as well as those released in Pokémon Gold and Silver. Transfer Pak compatibility is included for Pokémon Gold, Silver, and Crystal as well as Pokémon Red, Blue, and Yellow.

The Stadium series was not officially continued following the release of Stadium 2, though games with similar gameplay were released, including Pokémon Colosseum (2003), Pokémon XD: Gale of Darkness (2005), and Pokémon Battle Revolution (2006). According to Game Freak employees Shigeru Ohmori and Junichi Masuda, the Stadium series' main feature of allowing for Pokémon battles in 3D was not considered as "impressive" as it was before, primarily due to the release of Pokémon X and Y, the first mainline Pokémon games to feature entirely 3D graphics. They stated it would require "some sort of new invention" to justify the series' return.

The game was re-released on the Nintendo Classics service on April 12, 2023. The re-release functions identically to the original game, but transfer and connectivity capabilities with the Game Boy are not available. The Nintendo Classics emulator's built in online features allow players to play with others through Nintendo Switch Online.
