= Ted Lewis (voice actor) =

American voice actor (born 1969)

- Born: Edmund Paul Lewis; October 18, 1969 (age 57)
- Other name: Ed Paul
- Occupation: Voice actor
- Years active: 1990–present

Edmund Paul Lewis (born October 18, 1969), better known as Ted Lewis, is an American voice actor who does work for 4K Media Inc, Central Park Media, TAJ Productions, DuArt Film and Video and NYAV Post. He primarily works as an anime dub voice actor, and is best known as the voices of King Dedede and Escargoon from Kirby: Right Back at Ya!, the stadium announcer from both Pokémon Stadium and Pokémon Stadium 2, Ryo Bakura from Yu-Gi-Oh! Duel Monsters, Jack Atlas from Yu-Gi-Oh! 5D's. In 2018, Lewis won two Behind the Voice Actors Awards, both for 'Best Vocal Ensemble in an Anime Feature Film/Special' (for Yu-Gi-Oh! The Dark Side of Dimensions), though one was a People's Choice award.

== Filmography ==
=== Anime dubbing ===
- Battle Arena Toshinden – Eiji Shinjo
- Birdy the Mighty (OVA) – Hikawa
- Detonator Orgun – Tomoru Shindo/Orgun
- Emma – A Victorian Romance – William Jones
- Genshiken – Manabu Kuchiki
- Giant Robo (NYAV Post dub) – Kalho, Kusama, Shutsu
- Gokudo – Prince Niari
- Gokusen – Teruo Kuma Kumai
- Guardian of Darkness – Koichi
- Here Is Greenwood (CPM dub) – Kazuya Hasukawa
- His and Her Circumstances – Atsuya, Kei Arima
- Hi no Tori – Nielsen (Resurrection chapter)
- Ikkitousen: Dragon Destiny – Koukin Shuuyu
- Irresponsible Captain Tylor – Lt. Harold Katori, additional voices
- Jungle Emperor Leo: The Movie – Ham Egg
- Kirby: Right Back at Ya! – King Dedede, Escargoon, additional voices
- Now and Then, Here and There – Shuzo "Shu" Matsutani
- One Piece – Dalton, Merry
- Magical DoReMi – Ferdagio The Great, Charlie
- Ping Pong Club – Principal, additional voices
- Pokémon – James (Episodes 1–8), Giovanni, Tracey Sketchit, Gengar, additional voices
- Record of Lodoss War – Etoh
- Revolutionary Girl Utena – Mitsuru Tsuwabuki
- Shaman King – Mikihisa Asakura, Anatel Pokki, Goldva, Allen
- Slayers – Zangulus (14–26)
- Slayers NEXT – Zangulus
- Slayers Revolution – additional voices
- Sonic X – Nelson Thorndyke, Yellow Zelkova, President
- The King of Braves GaoGaiGar – Isamu Amami
- Tamagotchi: The Movie – Papamametchi
- Yu-Gi-Oh! – Bakura Ryou/Yami Bakura/Thief King Bakura, Bandit Keith, Alister, Croquet, Gozaburo Kaiba
- Yu-Gi-Oh! GX – Chumley, Admiral, Howard X Miller, Neo Spacian Grand Mole
- Yu-Gi-Oh! 5D's – Jack Atlas, Mitch, Rex Goodwin (young), Fake Jack Atlas
- Yu-Gi-Oh! Zexal – Dempsey Crossit, Cameron Clix
- Yu-Gi-Oh! Arc-V – Jack Atlas
- Yu-Gi-Oh! The Dark Side of Dimensions – Bakura

=== Animation ===
- Fireflies – Ray Banner
- Funky Cops (4Kids dub) – Additional voices
- G.I. Joe: Sigma 6 – Torch

=== Video games ===
- Pokémon Stadium – Stadium Announcer
- Pokémon Stadium 2 – Stadium Announcer
- Red Dead Redemption 2 – Danbury
- Yu-Gi-Oh! Capsule Monster Coliseum – Yami Bakura, Ryo Bakura
- Yu-Gi-Oh! Destiny Board Traveler – Yami Bakura
- Yu-Gi-Oh! Duel Links – Yami Bakura, Bandit Keith, (DSOD) Bakura, Jack Atlas, Alister

=== Script adaptation ===
- Funky Cops (4Kids dub)
- Ikki Tousen: Dragon Destiny
- Kirby: Right Back at Ya!
- Magical DoReMi
- Mew Mew Power
- Pokémon Chronicles
- Sonic X

=== Production assistant ===
- K.O. Beast

=== Voice director ===
- Pokémon (Season 5)
- Yu-Gi-Oh!
- Transformers: Cyberverse (Season 4)
