= The World Is Not Enough (GBC video game) =

2001 action-adventure game

- North American box art
- Developer: 2n Productions
- Publisher: Electronic Arts
- Series: James Bond
- Platform: Game Boy Color
- Release: NA: September 17, 2001; UK: September 28, 2001
- Genre: Action-adventure
- Mode: Single-player

The World Is Not Enough is a 2001 action-adventure video game developed by 2n Productions and published by Electronic Arts for the Game Boy Color. The game was the final release of the video games based on the 1999 James Bond film The World Is Not Enough starring Pierce Brosnan, following the Nintendo 64 and PlayStation versions of the game. The game was released in North America on September 17, 2001 and in Europe on September 28, 2001.

== Gameplay ==
The game is presented from a top-down oblique projection. The player's health and equipped weapon are displayed at the bottom of the screen.

The World Is Not Enough is an action-adventure game based on the 1999 James Bond film of the same name, where the player must control James Bond from a top-down oblique projection through eight mission-based levels. The game closely follows the plot of the film and its levels take place in film locations such as London and a Russian submarine. In each level, the player must complete many objectives and then escape. Objectives range from collecting keycards to gaining access to restricted areas of a level or using high-tech gadgets such as remote mines to destroy objects.

Bond has a limited amount of health which decreases when attacked by enemies, but the player can collect health-recovery items to restore a portion of his health. The player can also use several weapons to neutralize enemies, ranging from pistols to submachine guns, a grenade launcher, and a taser. If Bond dies, the player must start the level again from the beginning. Passwords must be used to restore the game to a specific level.

== Development and release ==
The World Is Not Enough was developed by 2n Productions, a video game developer based in Redwood City, California, and published by Electronic Arts for the Game Boy Color handheld console. The game was released on a 16-megabit cartridge in North America on September 17, 2001, and in the United Kingdom on September 28. The game was initially announced to be compatible with the Transfer Pak accessory, allowing players to transfer multiplayer character data to its Nintendo 64 counterpart depending on how far they reached in the game; however, this feature was dropped before release.

== Reception ==
Reception

Review scores
Publication	Score
AllGame	3.5/5
Nintendo Power	2/5
Consoles +	78%
Nintendo Acción	77/100

The World Is Not Enough received generally mixed reviews from critics, who unfavorably compared it to the 2000 Game Boy Color game Metal Gear Solid. AllGame praised the game for its diverse level designs and soundtrack, but noted the game's difficulty. Nintendo of America's official print magazine, Nintendo Power, criticized the game's clumsy controls, noting that the player cannot walk and shoot at the same time, while the French video games magazine, Consoles +, felt that the graphics lacked details. The Spanish official Nintendo magazine, Nintendo Acción, criticized the game's artificial intelligence, stating that enemies stop following the player if they are only a few steps away, and remarked that, due to the game's lack of graphic details, it is occasionally difficult to determine the objects that can be interacted with.
