= Pocket Monsters Stadium =

- Cover art depicting four Pokémon: (top to bottom) Charizard, Blastoise, Venusaur, and Pikachu. The bottom advertises the included Transfer Pak and its features.
- Developer: Nintendo EAD
- Publisher: Nintendo
- Director: Takao Shimizu
- Producers: Kenji Miki; Tsunekazu Ishihara; Satoru Iwata; Shigeru Miyamoto
- Programmer: Yasunari Nishida
- Composers: Kenta Nagata; Toru Minegishi; Mitsuhiro Hikino
- Series: Pokémon
- Platform: Nintendo 64
- Release: JP: August 1, 1998
- Genres: Turn-based strategy, RPG
- Modes: Single-player, multiplayer

Pocket Monsters Stadium (Note: Japanese: ポケモンスタジアム, Hepburn: Poketto Monsutā Sutajiamu) (also known as Pocket Monster Stadium or Pokémon Stadium in English) is a 1998 strategy role-playing video game developed and published by Nintendo and released in Japan for the Nintendo 64. Its gameplay is based upon the Pokémon battle formula previously introduced in the Game Boy games Pokémon Red and Green, though only 40 of the games' 151 Pokémon are available to use in gameplay. Originally intended for the 64DD, it was later developed into a standard console game. Using the Transfer Pak accessory that was bundled with the game, players are able to view, organize, store, and battle with Pokémon from the Game Boy games.

Pocket Monsters Stadium received mixed responses. Though it received positive reception for its Pokémon species animations, it was criticized for its lack of content, especially for those lacking a Game Boy to use the Transfer Pak features. A follow-up game, titled Pokémon Stadium 2 in Japan, was announced in 1998, and later released as Pokémon Stadium internationally.

== Gameplay ==
Battles in Stadium function similarly to battles in the Game Boy Pokémon games, with players using different moves to battle Pokémon used by opponent trainers. Pocket Monsters Stadium uses connectivity with the Nintendo 64 Transfer Pak to connect with the Game Boy games Pokémon Red, Green, Blue, and Yellow. Using the "Registration" feature, players can import Pokémon, and then use them in battles against CPU controlled opponents or other players. If players do not have access to a Game Boy, they can use rental Pokémon with pre-determined sets of moves. In the game's "Tournament" mode, players assemble a team of six Pokémon, then select three Pokémon from their team for each battle against a CPU opponent. The opposing Trainers in Tournament mode are based on the finalists of official Pokémon championships held in Japan between 1996 and 1998. Tournament mode is split into two "divisions" based on the level of the opponents' Pokémon: one for levels 1–30, and one for levels 50–55. A "Free Battle" mode allows players to battle CPU opponents or other players using a full team of six Pokémon with no level restrictions.

The game features several game mode options. The "Computer" option allows players to store their Pokémon in Stadium, with a "Picture Book" option allowing players to create a "photo album" and organize the stored Pokémon, allowing players to view their models. The "Quick Look" option allows players to view the stats and information related to an individual Pokémon, while a "Collection" feature lets players view information about any given species to find strategies for facing them. Players can also emulate a connected Pokémon game through their television using Stadium's "GB" function.

For the first time in the Pokémon franchise's history, Pokémon utilized three-dimensional models. An announcer commentates over battles. Completing either tournament division with a Pikachu transferred from the Game Boy games allows players to teach that Pikachu the move Surf, a move it cannot learn otherwise. This can in turn be used to unlock a special minigame in Pokémon Yellow.

=== Playable Pokémon ===
Only 40 different Pokémon are available to use in the game, though an in-game encyclopedia function allows players to view all 151 species of Pokémon available in the Game Boy games. The following Pokémon are available for use in battles:

- Venusaur
- Charizard
- Blastoise
- Beedrill
- Fearow
- Pikachu
- Nidoqueen
- Nidoking
- Dugtrio
- Primeape
- Arcanine
- Alakazam
- Machamp
- Golem
- Magneton
- Cloyster
- Gengar
- Onix
- Hypno
- Electrode
- Exeggutor
- Chansey
- Kangaskhan
- Starmie
- Scyther
- Jynx
- Pinsir
- Tauros
- Gyarados
- Lapras
- Ditto
- Vaporeon
- Jolteon
- Flareon
- Aerodactyl
- Snorlax
- Articuno
- Zapdos
- Moltres
- Dragonite

== Production and release ==
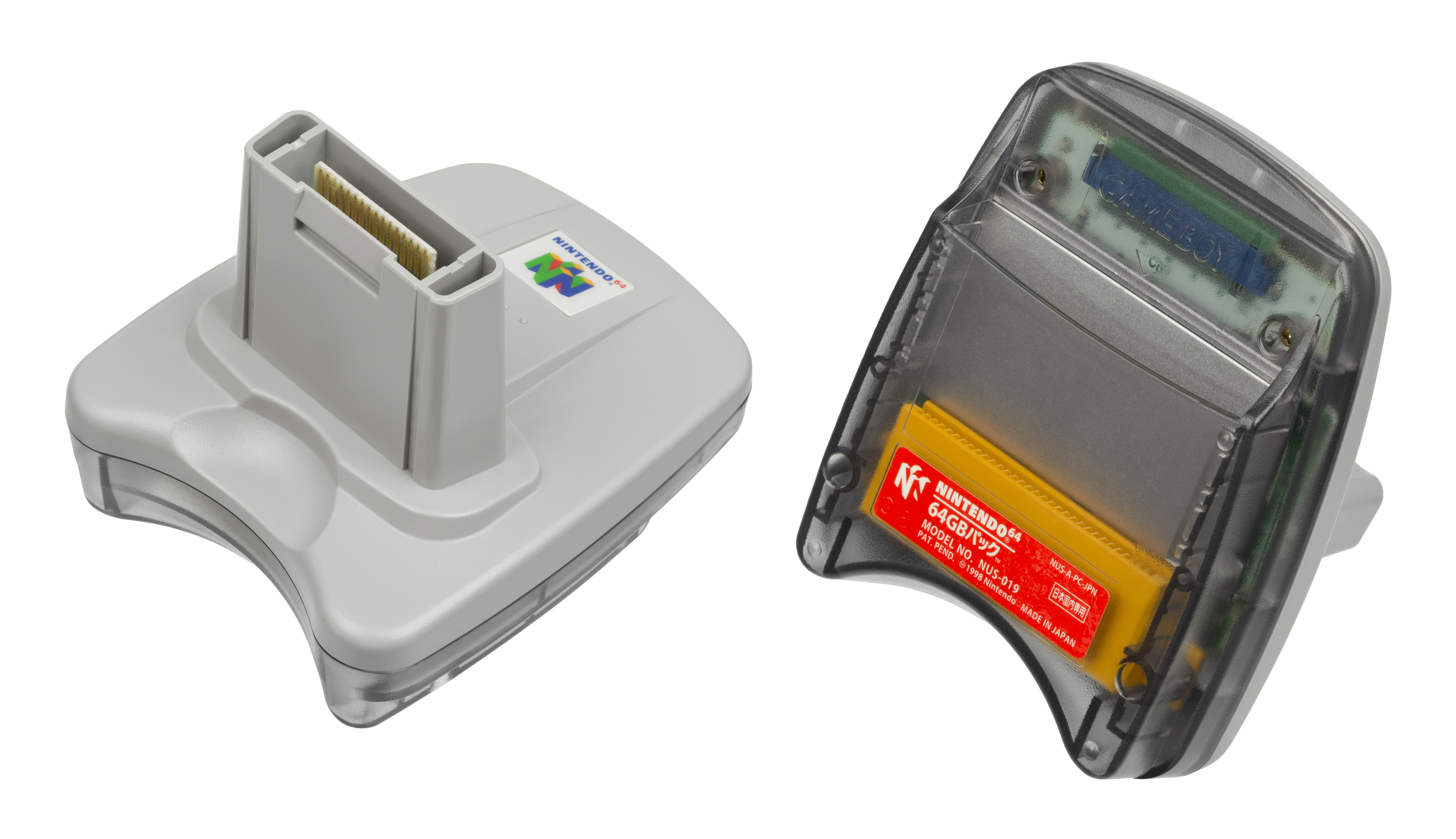
Pocket Monsters Stadium was bundled with the Transfer Pak on its release in Japan.

Connectivity with the Pokémon Game Boy games is available using the Transfer Pak (bundled with the game) in the same way as the internationally released Pokémon Stadium. HAL Laboratory president Satoru Iwata, who would later head Nintendo itself, ported the battle system to the Nintendo 64, taking a week to read the entire Game Boy source code before converting designer Shigeki Morimoto's programming from the Pokémon games. Iwata fixed compatibility issues with the Game Boy games and Stadium single-handedly. Because of technical limitations, only 40 Pokémon are available for battles, instead of the full 151 Pokémon from the Game Boy versions as originally planned. Most of these 40 were chosen based on their use in official Pokémon tournaments, while others were added to ensure each of the game's types were represented.

Once intended as a 64DD launch title with a March 1998 release date, the game was intended to take advantage of the 64DD's functionalities by allowing players to use Pokémon both on the go and at home. Stadium was eventually converted to a standard Nintendo 64 game on a 32 MB cartridge. Stadium was planned to have an initial Nintendo 64 release in Japan with a 64DD release later that year. No plans for other region releases were confirmed. Pocket Monsters Stadium was released only in Japan on August 1, 1998. GameSpot reported that it had 1.4 million pre-orders by June 1998. A reported 270,000 copies of the game were sold in its first month of release, and it accumulated 400,000 copies by October of the same year.

== Reception and legacy ==
A review in the 64 Magazine highlighted the personality present in the Pokémon species models and animations, but criticized the game's lack of content, especially if a player lacks access to the Game Boy games. A review in Gamers highlighted the game's graphical qualities, comparing it positively to N64 game Banjo-Kazooie. A review in Joypad considered the game fun for Pokémon fans and owners of the Game Boy games but a weaker title for those unfamiliar with the series. Peer Schneider, in a review for IGN, stated that the game was not worth importing for US audiences due to the release of Pokémon Stadium, which Schneider stated had significantly more content than Pocket Monsters Stadium.

Pocket Monsters Stadium was not released outside Japan. A sequel, dubbed Pokémon Stadium 2 in Japan, was announced in 1998. The game was released internationally as Pokémon Stadium. A follow-up game, titled Pokémon Stadium Gold/Silver in Japan was released as Pokémon Stadium 2 internationally.
