= Transfer Pak =

Accessory for the Nintendo 64

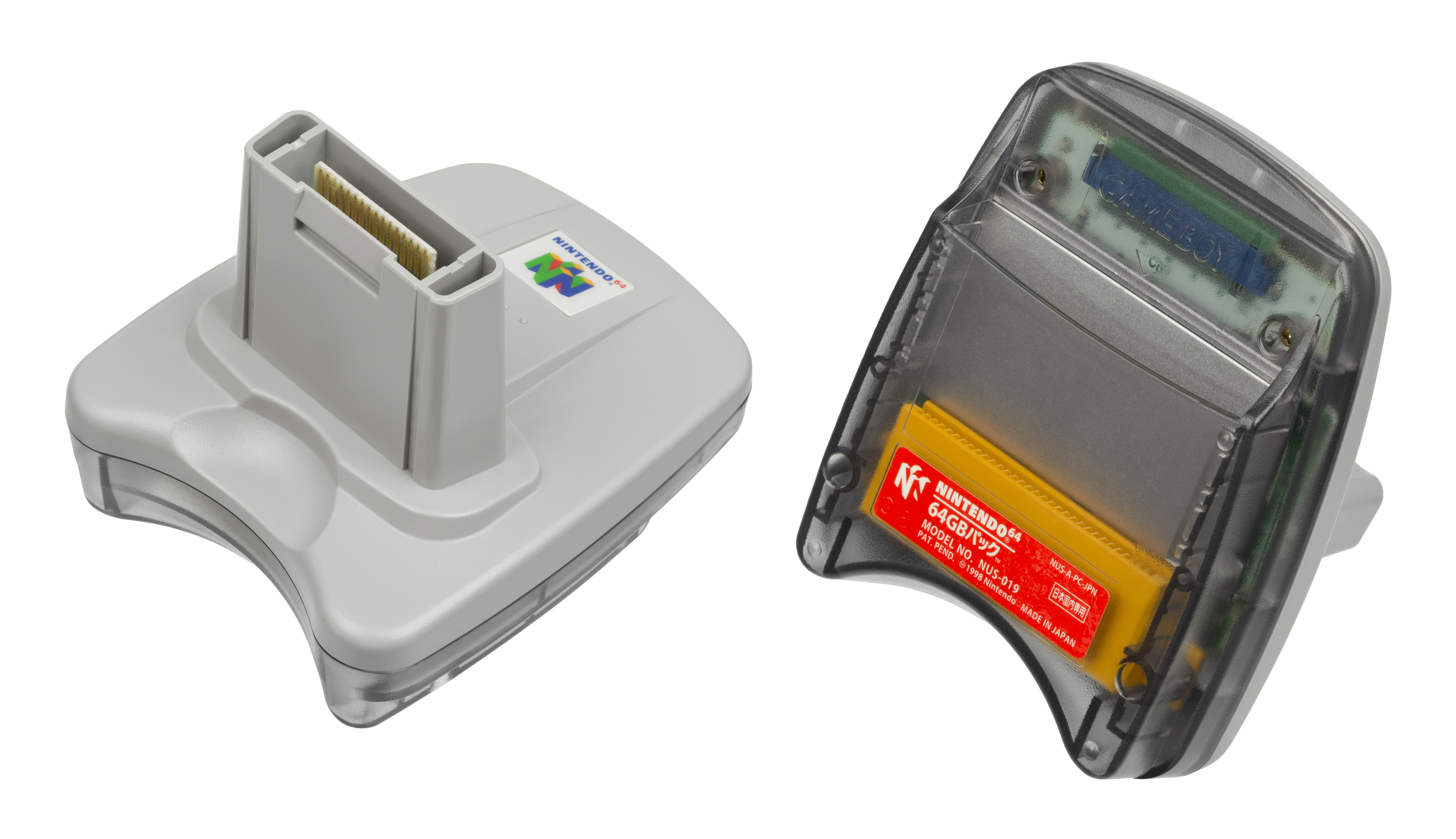
- The Japanese 64 GB Pack
- Also known as: NUS-019; 64 GB Pack
- Manufacturer: Nintendo
- Type: Data transfer device
- Generation: Fifth
- Released: JP: August 1, 1998; NA: March 6, 2000; EU: April 7, 2000
- Introductory price: ¥1,400; US$29.99
- Media: Game Boy Game Pak
- Connectivity: Nintendo 64 controller expansion port
- Dimensions: 78 mm × 93.4 mm × 69 mm (3.07 in × 3.68 in × 2.72 in)
- Weight: 88 g (0.194 lb)

The Transfer Pak, known in Japan as the 64 GB Pack, (Note: Japanese: 64GBパック, Hepburn: Rokujūyon Jī Bī Pakku) is an accessory manufactured by Nintendo that plugs into the Nintendo 64 (N64) controller. It allows for the transfer of data between supported N64 and Game Boy or Game Boy Color (GBC) games to access additional content. The Pokémon Stadium games, which the accessory was initially bundled with, also use it to emulate Game Boy Pokémon games on the N64.

The Transfer Pak is recognized as one of the first examples of connectivity between Nintendo's home and handheld consoles. It was supported by only twenty games released for the N64 and its 64DD expansion between 1998 and 2000, the majority of which were not released outside Japan. Several games that were initially planned to support the accessory were either cancelled or had the functionality removed before release. Digital re-releases of games with Transfer Pak support have also been inconsistent in retaining these features. As a result, retrospective coverage of the accessory has found it largely unnecessary. A similar accessory, the 64 GB Cable, (Note: Japanese: 64GBケーブル, Hepburn: Rokujūyon Jī Bī Kēburu) was designed to use the GBC as a second screen when playing 64DD games, but it was never released.

== History ==
The Transfer Pak was developed by Nintendo R&D3, and was first revealed at Nintendo's Space World 1997 trade show. Nintendo game designer Shigeru Miyamoto cited it as one of several devices the company was exhibiting at the show that allowed for games with non-traditional gameplay, along with the Voice Recognition Unit and the Game Boy Camera. It was initially released in Japan as a pack-in with the game Pocket Monsters Stadium (1998), which required the Transfer Pak for many of its features. In North America and Europe, the Transfer Pak was similarly bundled with Pokémon Stadium (1999) for its English-language release in 2000, and received a standalone release shortly thereafter.

=== 64 GB Cable ===
At Space World 1997, in addition to the Transfer Pak, a similar accessory called the 64 GB Cable was announced by Marigul Management, a joint venture between Nintendo and Recruit. It was designed for use with the 64DD, a rewritable disk drive peripheral for the N64 that would eventually release in 1999. The cable would connect from an N64 controller port to a dedicated GBC cartridge, allowing players to transfer data between the GBC and a 64DD storage disk. Additionally, players would be able to use the GBC as a sub-screen for certain 64DD games.

The 64 GB Cable was first publicly exhibited at Space World 1999 alongside DT Bloodmasters, a trading card game developed by Game Studio and directed by Masanobu Endō. DT Bloodmasters was planned to use the cable to exchange cards between the two systems and allow players to privately view their cards on the GBC screen. The cable and DT Bloodmasters were ultimately never released due to the 64DD's poor sales, with the game being reworked into a standalone GBC game, DT: Lords of Genomes, released in May 2001. The N64 horse racing simulation game Derby Stallion 64 (2001), originally planned as a 64DD release, was intended to support the 64 GB Cable. The game would have used the GBC as a second screen to place private bets on horse races, but this feature was removed during its transition to a standard N64 release. The cable was also planned for use in an untitled Capcom game being developed in collaboration with anime director and Gundam creator Yoshiyuki Tomino. Another unreleased accessory from Marigul, the GB Socket, was designed to interface with the 64 GB Cable and allow Game Boy Color games to similarly connect to games on the Sega Dreamcast, such as connecting Sakura Wars GB (2000) to Sakura Wars 3 (2001).

== Functionality ==
The Transfer Pak plugs into the expansion port on the back of a Nintendo 64 controller, similar to other accessories for the system such as Controller Pak memory cards and the Rumble Pak force feedback device. It features a cartridge slot compatible with Game Boy and GBC Game Paks; when a Game Pak is properly inserted into this slot, compatible N64 games can read and exchange data with the connected portable game. While the device itself is physically compatible with all Game Boy and GBC games, most N64 games with Transfer Pak support can only connect to games from the same region.

Unlike the Super Game Boy peripheral, which allowed Game Boy games to be played on the Super Nintendo Entertainment System, the Transfer Pak's primary use is not to play Game Boy games on the N64. Nintendo and Intelligent Systems developed a separate accessory for playing Game Boy games on the N64, the Wide-Boy64, which was not released to the public; it was available only to game developers and members of the gaming press, and was used to capture footage and images from Game Boy games more easily. Datel also released an unofficial Game Boy player for the system in 1998 called the Game Booster, also known as the GB Hunter, which was poorly received. However, the Pokémon Stadium games include a built-in Game Boy emulator, allowing users to play compatible Pokémon games on the N64 by inserting them into the Transfer Pak. The emulation software is based on the Super Game Boy, including applying the same borders and color palettes during gameplay.

=== Supported games ===
The Transfer Pak is supported by a total of twenty games, comprising eighteen N64 games and two 64DD games. The majority of these games were not released outside of Japan, with only six games released in Western markets that support the accessory. Games use the device for different purposes, including transferring progress between N64 and Game Boy, unlocking hidden content, and triggering special effects based on the connected Game Boy game. The following is a complete list of all compatible N64 and 64DD games, along with the corresponding Game Boy and GBC games.

Transfer Pak compatible games
Nintendo 64 game	Game Boy (Color) game	Features
Choro Q 64 2: Hachamecha Grand Prix Race (1999)	Choro Q Hyper Customable GB (1999)	Each player's maximum speed is increased in Hachamecha Grand Prix Race if their controller is connected to Hyper Customable GB.
Jikkyō Powerful Pro Yakyū 6 (1999)	Power Pro Kun Pocket (1999)	Baseball players can be transferred from GBC to N64; a password can also be used in place of the Transfer Pak.
Jikkyō Powerful Pro Yakyū 2000 (2000)	Power Pro Kun Pocket 2 (2000)	Baseball players can be transferred from GBC to N64; a password can also be used in place of the Transfer Pak.
Mario Artist: Paint Studio (1999)	Game Boy Camera (1998)	Players can take photographs with the Game Boy Camera during gameplay and import them into the 64DD game's creation suite.
Mario Artist: Talent Studio (2000)	Game Boy Camera (1998)	Players can take photographs with the Game Boy Camera during gameplay and import them into the 64DD game's creation suite.
Mario Golf (Note: Worldwide release) (1999)	Mario Golf (1999)	The player characters from the GBC version's story mode can be temporarily transferred to the N64, allowing them to gain experience points through gameplay that are transferred back to the GBC version. The GBC version also allows players to view their high scores from the N64 game.
Mario Tennis (2000)	Mario Tennis (2000)	The player characters from the GBC version's Mario Tour mode can be transferred to the N64, allowing them to gain experience points through gameplay that are transferred back to the GBC version. When the two versions are connected, Yoshi, Wario, Waluigi, and Bowser are unlocked as playable characters in the GBC game, along with their respective minigames. Connecting both versions again after completing these minigames unlocks additional tennis courts in the N64 game.
Mickey's Speedway USA (2000)	Mickey's Speedway USA (2001)	Connecting the two versions unlocks Huey as a playable character in the N64 release.
Nushi Tsuri 64 (1998)	Umi no Nushi Tsuri 2 (1998)	Players can transfer data from their in-game notebooks on GBC to N64. Sea fish that are normally only present in Umi no Nushi Tsuri 2 can also be added to the fishing pond in Nushi Tsuri 64
Nushi Tsuri 64: Shiokaze Ninotte (2000)	Kawa no Nushi Tsuri 4 (1999)	Players can transfer data from their in-game notebooks on GBC to N64.
PD Ultraman Battle Collection 64 (1999)	Any	Players will unlock different characters for play based on which Game Boy game is inserted, similar to the use of CDs in Monster Rancher.
Perfect Dark (2000)	Perfect Dark (2000)	Connecting the two games immediately unlocks four cheats in the N64 release—Cloaking Device, Hurricane Fists, R-Tracker, and All Guns—which would normally require players to complete several difficult in-game objectives to unlock them. Prior to release, the N64 game featured a mode called "Perfect Head", through which players could transfer photos from the Game Boy Camera to create characters with real-life faces for use in multiplayer matches. This mode was removed during development as a result of both technical issues and a wave of anti-violent video game sentiment after the Columbine High School massacre.
Pocket Monsters Stadium (1998)	Pocket Monsters Red, Green, Blue, and Yellow Versions (1996–1998)	By connecting to a Game Boy Pokémon game, players can view and organize their Pokémon, transfer them from the Game Boy games to Stadium for storage and use in battle, trade them between Game Boy games, or emulate the Game Boy games for play on their television, the speed of which can be doubled or tripled through unlockable settings. Players can also teach a transferred Pikachu the move "Surf" in Stadium, which can be used to unlock a secret minigame in Yellow.
Pokémon Stadium (1999)	Pokémon Red, Green, Blue, and Yellow Versions (1996–1998)	In addition to retaining all the Transfer Pak features from Pocket Monsters Stadium, players can unlock special prize Pokémon to send to the Game Boy game.
Pokémon Stadium 2 (2000)	Pokémon Red, Green, Blue, Yellow, Gold, Silver, and Crystal Versions (1996–2000)	In addition to the Pokémon transfer and emulation functions from the previous games, Stadium 2 allows players to transfer items, play as transferred Pokémon in its minigames, view and customize the player character's room from Gold, Silver, and Crystal in 3D, and receive special items in Gold, Silver, and Crystal using the "Mystery Gift" option. The Japanese release could also connect to Crystal to watch prerecorded battles downloaded from the Mobile System GB networking service prior to its shutdown in 2002.
Puyo Puyo~n Party (1999)	Pocket Puyo Puyo Sun (1998)	Players can view a gallery in Party of special illustrations earned in Sun, some of which can only be unlocked by connecting the two games.
Robot Ponkottsu 64: Nanatsu no Umi no Caramel (1999)	Any Robot Ponkottsu Sun, Star, and Moon Versions (1998–1999)	Connecting to any game will generate a special food item in Nanatsu no Umi no Caramel, which can be fed to the player's Robopon to increase their stats. The food and its effectiveness will vary based on which game is connected. Connecting to any of the Robot Ponkottsu GBC games also allows players to exchange and battle their Robopon between GBC and N64. Only the 45 Robopon species that appear in Nanatsu no Umi no Caramel can be transferred between games.
Super B-Daman: Battle Phoenix 64 (1998)	Super B-Daman: Fighting Phoenix (1997)	Items can be transferred from Fighting Phoenix to Battle Phoenix 64.
Super Robot Taisen 64 (1999)	Super Robot Taisen: Link Battler (1999)	Players can transfer character experience between games, as well as unlock playable units in each game that are otherwise exclusive to the other. Players who link the two games can unlock up to 4 additional units in 64, along with a set of maps featuring these additional units, and up to 21 additional units in Link Battler.
Transformers: Beast Wars Metals 64 (Note: While released in North America as Transformers: Beast Wars Transmetals, only the Japanese Metals 64 release features Transfer Pak compatibility.) (1999)	Any Kettō Transformers Beast Wars: Beast Senshi Saikyō Ketteisen (1999)	In the Japanese version, the player's default health and energy capacity can be positively or negatively affected based on the connected game. Kettō Beast Wars grants the greatest possible boost and unlocks the secret boss Megatron X as a playable character.

=== Cancelled support ===
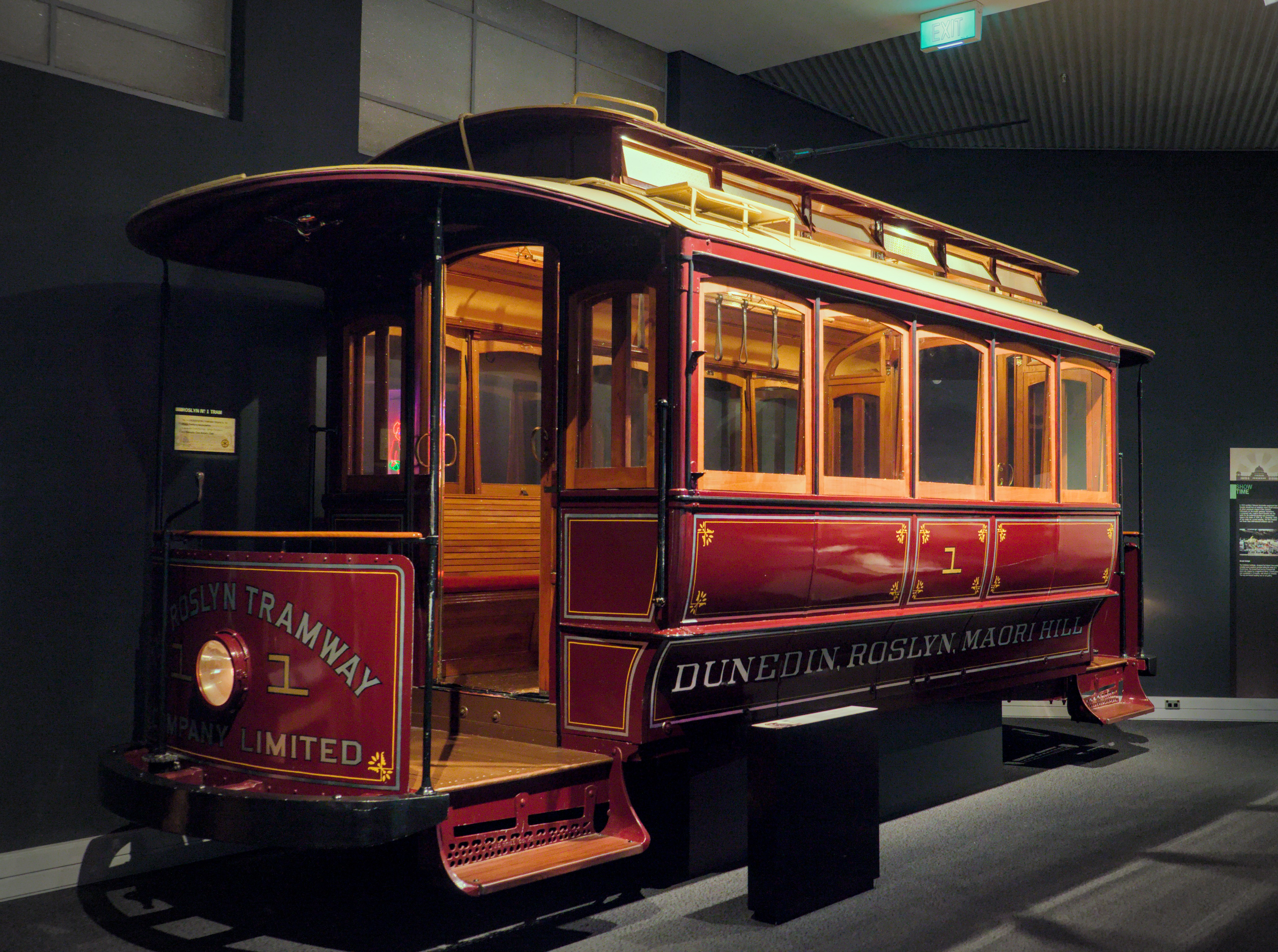
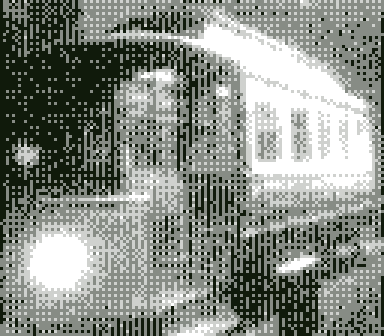
Plans to use the Transfer Pak in Pokémon Snap were abandoned due to the Game Boy Camera's lower image quality (below).

Some games were intended to include Transfer Pak features, only for them to be removed prior to release, which contributed to the low number of compatible games. During the development of Pokémon Snap (1999), Satoru Iwata experimented with transferring photos to the Game Boy Camera so that they could be printed using the Game Boy Printer; however, the development team found the quality of the resulting image to be insufficient, and the feature was abandoned in favor of printing stickers through print stations at specific retailers. The GBC version of The World Is Not Enough (2000) was initially reported to feature Transfer Pak connectivity with its N64 counterpart, allowing players to strengthen their characters in the N64 game's multiplayer mode, but this was dropped before release. WWF No Mercy (2000) was meant to use the Transfer Pak to import points earned in its GBC counterpart, allowing them to be spent on rewards in the N64 game's "SmackDown Mall". However, this feature was removed following the cancellation of the GBC version.

Other games with planned Transfer Pak support were never released in any form. One of these was Cabbage, a 64DD breeding simulator game, which would have featured the Transfer Pak as a major gameplay component. The game was planned to let players transfer their virtual pet to the Game Boy and continue nurturing it throughout the day. Another unreleased game was 64 Wars, a planned N64 entry in Nintendo's Wars series of strategy video games. The unreleased entry was intended to feature the same battle maps as Game Boy Wars 2 (1998), and would have allowed players to transfer their progress between the two games.

== Reception ==
Reviews of the Pokémon Stadium games praised their use of the Transfer Pak, with outlets such as IGN, GameSpot, and Eurogamer believing that players who did not use it would find the appeal and features of the games severely limited. Similarly, Peer Schneider of IGN considered the Transfer Pak functionality in PD Ultraman Battle Collection 64 to be the game's sole redeeming feature. Some members of the press later identified the Transfer Pak as an influence on later examples of connectivity between Nintendo's home consoles and handhelds, most notably the GameCube–Game Boy Advance link cable. David Craddock of Shacknews called the device "ahead of its time", noting the novelty of interconnectivity between game systems at the time of its release. When reviewing the Wii Virtual Console re-releases of Mario Golf and Mario Tennis, Lucas M. Thomas, another IGN writer, expressed disappointment with the removal of Transfer Pak functionality, lamenting the games' incompleteness due to the inaccessibility of their Transfer Pak-exclusive content.

In the years since the N64's discontinuation, the Transfer Pak has been largely regarded as an underutilized and unnecessary add-on. Den of Geek's Daniel Kurland considered the Transfer Pak to be "a frivolity rather than something fundamental", particularly given the meager number of games that supported it. Writing for GamesBeat, André Bardin also found the Transfer Pak largely useless due to its lack of support, particularly outside of Japan. Gavin Lane stated in a retrospective for Nintendo Life that the Transfer Pak, while interesting, never truly reached its full potential. Many players misinterpreted the Transfer Pak as a device for playing Game Boy games on the television like the Super Game Boy, leading to disappointment, according to Brett Elston of GamesRadar+. Elston also described most games' Transfer Pak integration as "an afterthought, with features that were barely worth the hassle of digging it out of the closet."

== Legacy ==
Games with Transfer Pak-exclusive content have generally not retained these features when digitally re-released on later platforms, such as through the Virtual Console storefront on Wii, Nintendo 3DS, and Wii U, or the Nintendo Classics subscription service on Nintendo Switch and Nintendo Switch 2. There have been some exceptions: The 2010 remaster of Perfect Dark for Xbox 360 unlocks the same selection of cheats if the game detects a Perfect Dark Zero (2005) save file on the console. In the 2024 re-release of Mario Tennis (GBC) for Nintendo Classics, the Transfer Pak-exclusive characters and minigames are accessible by default.

Other unofficial examples of Transfer Pak functionality have been developed since the N64's discontinuation. In 2019, an independent software developer created a ROM hack of Pokémon Stadium 2 that expanded the emulator's compatibility, allowing players to emulate other Game Boy games connected via the Transfer Pak. Hero of Law, a 2025 ROM hack of The Legend of Zelda: Ocarina of Time (1998), can connect to the Game Boy The Legend of Zelda games—Link's Awakening (1993), Link's Awakening DX (1998), Oracle of Seasons, and Oracle of Ages (2001)—to unlock extra bonus content, including an additional story segment; the player's progress in Link's Awakening affects the presentation of the extra story. In December 2023, as part of its update to add N64 support, the Polymega aftermarket console implemented Transfer Pak functionality, allowing players to use the device to dump their Game Boy games and save files to the system's memory for play.

== See also ==
- Nintendo 64 accessories
