= Pokémon Stadium 2 =

2000 video game

- North American box art featuring the legendary Pokémon Ho-Oh (left) and Lugia (right)
- Developer: Nintendo EAD
- Publisher: Nintendo
- Director: Takao Shimizu
- Producers: Kenji Miki; Tsunekazu Ishihara; Satoru Iwata; Shigeru Miyamoto
- Programmer: Tsutomu Kaneshige
- Artist: Tatsuya Hishida
- Composer: Hajime Wakai
- Series: Pokémon
- Platform: Nintendo 64
- Release: JP: December 14, 2000; NA: March 26, 2001; AU: April 7, 2001; EU: October 10, 2001
- Genre: Turn-based strategy
- Modes: Single-player, multiplayer

Pokémon Stadium 2, known in Japan as Pokémon Stadium Gold & Silver, (Note: Japanese: ポケモンスタジアム金銀, Hepburn: Pokemon Sutajiamu Kin Gin) (Note: Also known in Japan as Pokémon Stadium Gold, Silver & Crystal Version (Japanese: ポケモンスタジアム 金銀 クリスタルバージョン, Hepburn: Pokemon Sutajiamu Kin Gin Kurisutaru Bājon)) is a strategy video game developed and published by Nintendo for the Nintendo 64. It is the third game in the Pokémon Stadium series, following prior releases Pocket Monsters Stadium and Pokémon Stadium. It features all 251 Pokémon from the first and second generations of the franchise, and allows for players to battle either with other players or against computer-controlled opponents. Like its predecessor, Pokémon Stadium 2 is compatible with the Transfer Pak accessory, allowing players to use Pokémon trained in the three original Game Boy Pokémon games (Pokémon Red, Blue, and Yellow) and the three Game Boy Color games (Pokémon Gold, Silver, and Crystal).

Pokémon Stadium 2 was produced as a result of the popularity and strong sales of the series' prior entry, Pokémon Stadium, and demonstrated publicly during the 2000 Nintendo Space World trade show. Several publications considered its release to be part of marketing for the series' popularity at the time. The game was released in 2000 in Japan and 2001 worldwide.

The game received largely positive reviews from critics, who highlighted its graphics and the amount of content available, though many found the game similar to its predecessor. Criticism was directed to the fact that many felt it was better suited to fans of the series than a casual audience, and that a full experience of the game necessitated the use of Transfer Pak capabilities.

Following the release of the game, no further games in the Stadium series were released, though games with similar gameplay to the series were released afterward. The game was re-released on the Nintendo Classics service in 2023.

== Gameplay ==
A battle between the player's Graveler and the opponent's Ekans. Pokémon statistics are displayed in the boxes in opposing corners.

Like prior entries in the series, Pokémon Stadium 2 utilizes turn-based RPG gameplay. Teams of up to six fictional creatures called Pokémon can be used in battle, either against computer controlled opponents or against other players. Players can use these creatures' special moves against an opposing Pokémon, with these moves having many effects, such as doing damage or by inflicting status conditions; for example, a Pokémon can be poisoned, which causes it to take small amounts of additional damage each turn. Pokémon can also be affected by elemental "types", which modify damage taken by a species from a given attack. For example, a Grass-type Pokémon takes more damage from a Fire-type attack than it would another move. Players may switch out their active Pokémon for another in their team, though this uses up their turn.

Pokémon Stadium 2 does not have a storyline. Progress can be made by winning trophies in the Stadium, a tournament mode consisting of four "Cups", as well as completing the Gym Leader Castle, where the player earns badges by defeating Gym Leader characters who first appeared in the various Game Boy Pokémon games, culminating in a battle against the character Red. When all Stadium trophies have been won and the Gym Leader Castle is completed, the player's rival will want to battle. Defeating the rival will unlock Round 2, in which the player must re-challenge the Stadium, Gym Leader Castle, and the Rival at a higher difficulty level. Players can also utilize the "Battle Now!" mode to engage in quick battles with random Pokémon, while Free Battle mode allows players to either practice on their own or against another player. Up to four players can battle each other, though players must share control of a team with another player if more than two participate. If players play as a tag team, players select three Pokémon each from a team of six; players can only swap Pokémon out with their partner's, at which point the partner controls the Pokémon on the field.

=== Additional features ===
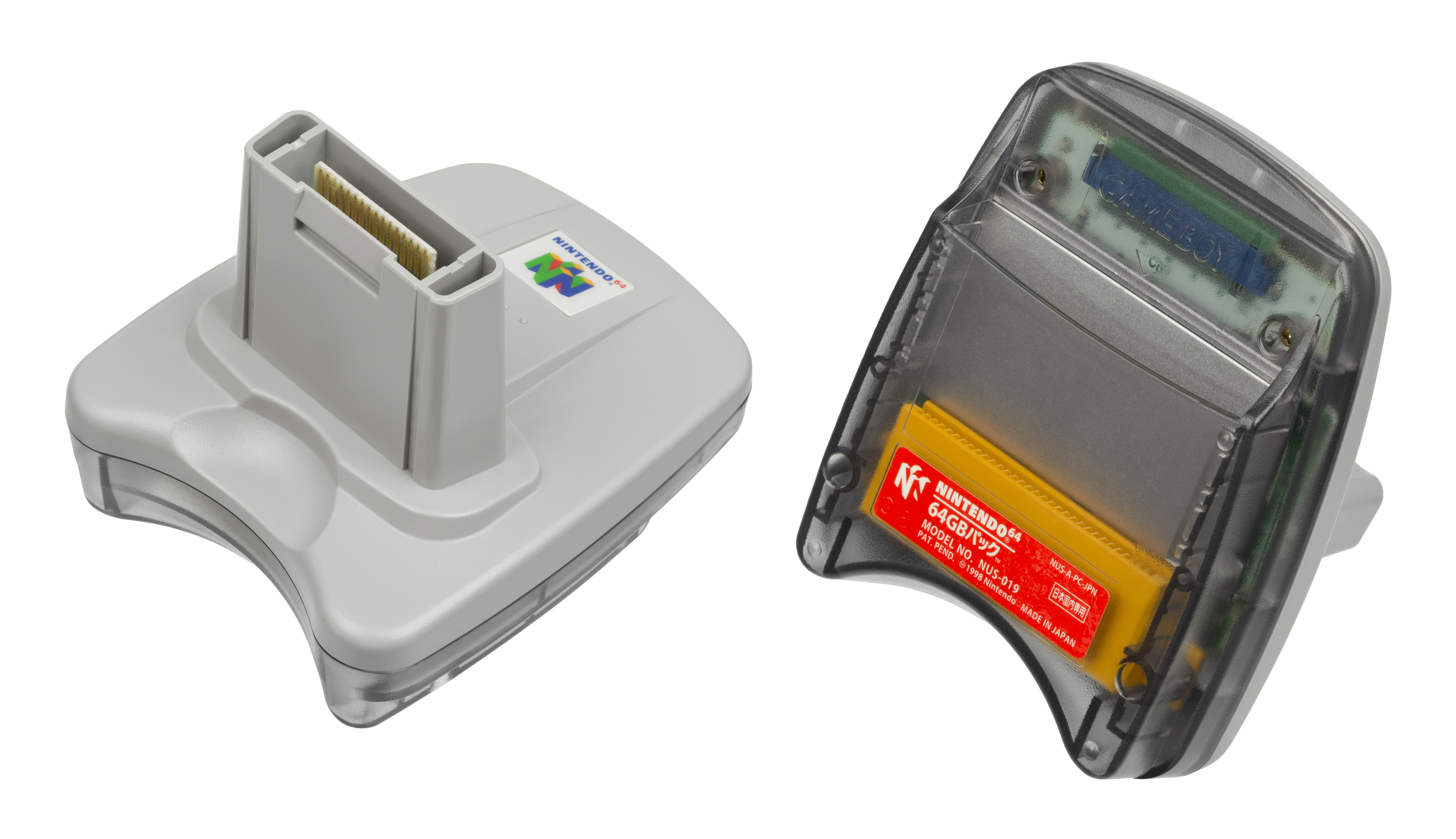
Pokémon Stadium 2 makes use of the Nintendo 64 Transfer Pak (pictured) to communicate with the Game Boy Pokémon games like its predecessor.

The Mini-Game Park mode allows up to four players to play twelve different Pokémon-themed mini-games. Examples include a game where a top-like Pokémon named Hitmontop must be used to knock other Hitmontop off of the arena, and a game where a Pokémon named Delibird must sort and deliver gifts, with the player who delivers the most gifts being crowned the winner. Players can use their Pokémon from the Game Boy games in these mini-games instead of the standard species; for instance, a player can use their own Scizor in the species' respective mini-game. A new mode, called "Mini-Game Champion", allows players to play these mini-games while also attempting to collect coins, with the player with the most coins being crowned the winner. Mini-Game Champion also features event-based mechanics, similarly to the Mario Party series; one event is capable of causing players to lose some of their coins and give them to other players. Stadium 2 also introduces quizzes, which allow players to answer Pokémon-themed questions to see how many can be answered while under a time limit. Quizzes can also be played with multiple players, and difficulty options for questions can be selected.

The Game Boy Tower feature returns from the prior entry, Pokémon Stadium. Using the Transfer Pak, players can connect to the games Pokémon Gold and Silver, Pokémon Crystal, and Pokémon Red, Blue, and Yellow and transfer their Pokémon from those games into Stadium 2. Once transferred, players can use these Pokémon in battles in Stadium 2. Additionally, players can use the Pak to play the Game Boy games on the Nintendo 64 console. The Pokémon Laboratory mode also returns, which allows players to organize their Pokémon storage in the Game Boy games through Stadium 2 as well as view 3D world maps of the Game Boy games and all 251 species' 3D models. Players can also use the lab to trade Pokémon between the Game Boy games without the need for a Game Link Cable.

Other features include Earl's Pokémon Academy, which teaches players about battling mechanics; My Room, in which players can view and decorate their bedroom from Gold, Silver, or Crystal in 3D; and the Mystery Gift function, which allows players with Stadium 2 to send items to Gold, Silver, or Crystal once a day. In the Japanese version of Pokémon Crystal, players could use the Mobile Adapter GB peripheral to battle other players remotely over the Mobile System GB network service; replays of these battles could then be recorded and transferred to Pokémon Stadium 2's "Mobile Stadium" mode to be viewed in 3D.

== Development and release ==
Pokémon Stadium, known in Japan as Pokémon Stadium 2, sold highly and was popular enough to be included in bundles for the Nintendo 64 console. The success led to the development of a third entry. Scheduled for a late 2000 release, the game was demonstrated publicly at the 2000 Nintendo Space World festival. It was considered by IGN to be part of a large franchise-wide marketing push, coupled alongside the release of Pokémon the Movie 2000, and Nintendo Life considered the game to be part of a larger push to capitalize on the success of the Pokémon franchise's first generation.

By July 20, 2000, the game's title was changed from Pokémon Stadium 3 to Pokémon Stadium Gold/Silver. Nintendo announced more information on October 3, including the dates of the Japanese release and official tournaments. On October 25, Nintendo set the game's North American release date for March 26, 2001. The game was released in Japan on December 14, 2000, and later released in 2001 globally. The game had a marketing budget of $7 million. Following its release, the game became the 18th best-selling Nintendo 64 video game, with a reported shipment of 2,540,000 units. It was the tenth highest selling video game of 2001.

== Reception ==
Reception

Aggregate scores
Aggregator	Score
GameRankings	73.31%
Metacritic	78 of 100

Review scores
Publication	Score
Electronic Gaming Monthly	5/10, 6/10, 6.5/10
Eurogamer	6 of 10
Famitsu	31 of 40
Game Informer	6 of 10
GamePro	4.5 of 5
GameSpot	7.2 of 10
IGN	7.5 of 10
Nintendo Power	4/5
Dengeki Nintendo 64	8/10, 9/10, 9/10

Pokémon Stadium 2 holds a 78% score on the review aggregate website Metacritic, indicating "generally favorable reviews". GameRankings rated it 73.31% based on 18 reviews.

GamePro stated that the game would be an enjoyable experience for fans of the series, finding the game to be an upgrade to its predecessor's. Gerald Villoria, in a review for GameSpot, found the game to require the Game Boy compatibility to get a complete experience, but was a strong release alongside the Game Boy games. He highlighted several aspects of the game, such as its accessibility for new players and the animations and models for the Pokémon, though criticized the game's lackluster soundtrack, sound effects, and announcer. Electronic Gaming Monthly's three-person review stated that the game was a strong release for fans of the series, but those without a Transfer Pak or a strong attachment to the series would not be as interested in the game. They also found its gameplay incredibly similar to the previous entry in the series. Reviewers in Dengeki Nintendo 64 found the game highly useful for fans of the Game Boy game as it was useful for organizing items and its guide for in-depth game material such as egg groups and secondary effects of attacks. One reviewer commented that while it all comprehensive, they with there was a new scenario for those who wanted a new narrative along with the battles.

Eurogamer's Tom Bramwell found the game's gameplay to be highly repetitive, and that only those who deeply enjoyed the series and its gameplay would enjoy it. He highlighted Earl's Battle Academy and the ability to play the Game Boy games on the television as positives for the game. IGN's Chris Carle stated that while the game had a large number of options available to the player, and that the release was improved greatly from the previous installment, players without the Transfer Pak would lack much excitement with the game. He also criticized the game's announcer, finding it to be a negative carried across from the previous entry. In a retrospective review from Nintendo Life, writer Arjun Joshi stated that nearly every part of the game included in Stadium was improved in some way in the sequel, though he felt that the game's soundtrack was a downgrade, and that the game featured a lack of revamped graphics from its predecessor.

Pokémon Stadium 2 was a nominee for "11th Annual GamePro Readers' Choice Awards" for "Best Action Game of the Year", but lost to Grand Theft Auto III for PlayStation 2.

== Legacy ==
Following the release of Stadium 2, no other games in the Stadium series were released, though games with similar gameplay followed such as Pokémon Colosseum. According to Game Freak employees Shigeru Ohmori and Junichi Masuda, the Stadium series' main feature of allowing for Pokémon battles in 3D was not considered as "impressive" as it was before, primarily due to the release of Pokémon X and Y, the first mainline Pokémon games to feature entirely 3D graphics. They stated it would require "some sort of new invention" to justify the series' return. Stadium 2 was later re-released via the Nintendo Classics service in 2023. The re-release functions identically to the original, though players are unable to use the game's Transfer Pak features.
