= Pokémon Crystal =

2000 video game

- Box art for Pokémon Crystal, depicting the legendary Pokémon Suicune
- Developer: Game Freak
- Publisher: Nintendo
- Directors: Satoshi Tajiri; Junichi Masuda
- Producers: Satoru Iwata; Satoshi Yamamoto; Shigeru Miyamoto; Tsunekazu Ishihara
- Designers: Junichi Masuda; Koji Nishino; Toshinobu Matsumiya
- Programmers: Shigeki Morimoto; Tetsuya Watanabe; Takenori Ohta
- Artist: Ken Sugimori
- Writers: Junichi Masuda; Koji Nishino; Toshinobu Matsumiya
- Composers: Go Ichinose; Junichi Masuda; Morikazu Aoki
- Series: Pokémon
- Platform: Game Boy Color
- Release: JP: 14 December 2000; NA: 30 July 2001; AU: 30 September 2001; EU: 2 November 2001
- Genre: Role-playing
- Modes: Single-player, multiplayer

Pokémon Crystal Version (Note: Japanese: ポケットモンスター クリスタルバージョン, Hepburn: Poketto Monsutā Kurisutaru Bājon; lit. 'Pocket Monsters: Crystal Version') is a role-playing video game developed by Game Freak and published by Nintendo for the Game Boy Color, released in Japan in December 2000 and internationally throughout 2001. Serving as an enhanced edition of the 1999 titles Pokémon Gold and Silver, it is the final entry in the second generation of the Pokémon game series. The game introduced several new features, including additional story elements, a Battle Tower area, the option to play as a female protagonist, animated Pokémon sprites during battles, and various minor improvements. The Japanese version of the game also utilized the capabilities of the Mobile Adapter GB, a peripheral that allowed players to trade and battle over cell phones and a paid subscription service called "Mobile System GB". These enhancements were made possible by the Game Boy Color's improved hardware, making Crystal the first game in the series to be incompatible with the original Game Boy.

Although Pokémon Crystal is the lowest-selling main series Pokémon game to date, it still ranks among the top ten best-selling Game Boy titles. Critics praised Crystal for its additional features and improvements but noted that many of these features were less significant in the non-Japanese versions, which lacked Mobile Adapter GB support. Retrospective reviews have been highly positive, with many acknowledging Crystal's introduction of features that would become commonplace in later iterations of the Pokémon series, and its role in maintaining interest during a waning period for the franchise.

== Gameplay ==
Similar to Pokémon Gold and Silver, Pokémon Crystal is a role-playing video game where players navigate a fictional world by capturing, training, and battling with Pokémon. In addition, Crystal enhances aspects of Gold and Silver, providing cosmetic and gameplay improvements. The visual presentation of Crystal is enhanced through the animation of Pokémon sprites when first encountered in battle, the inclusion of signposts appearing on the screen when entering a new area, and a range of minor graphical enhancements to various locations in the game. It includes the ability to select one of two player characters, adding Kris, a female trainer, with a unique sprite. The game introduces a Battle Tower, a new stadium that allows players to battle a series of seven trainers with three Pokémon set at customizable maximum levels to win prizes.

=== Mobile System GB ===
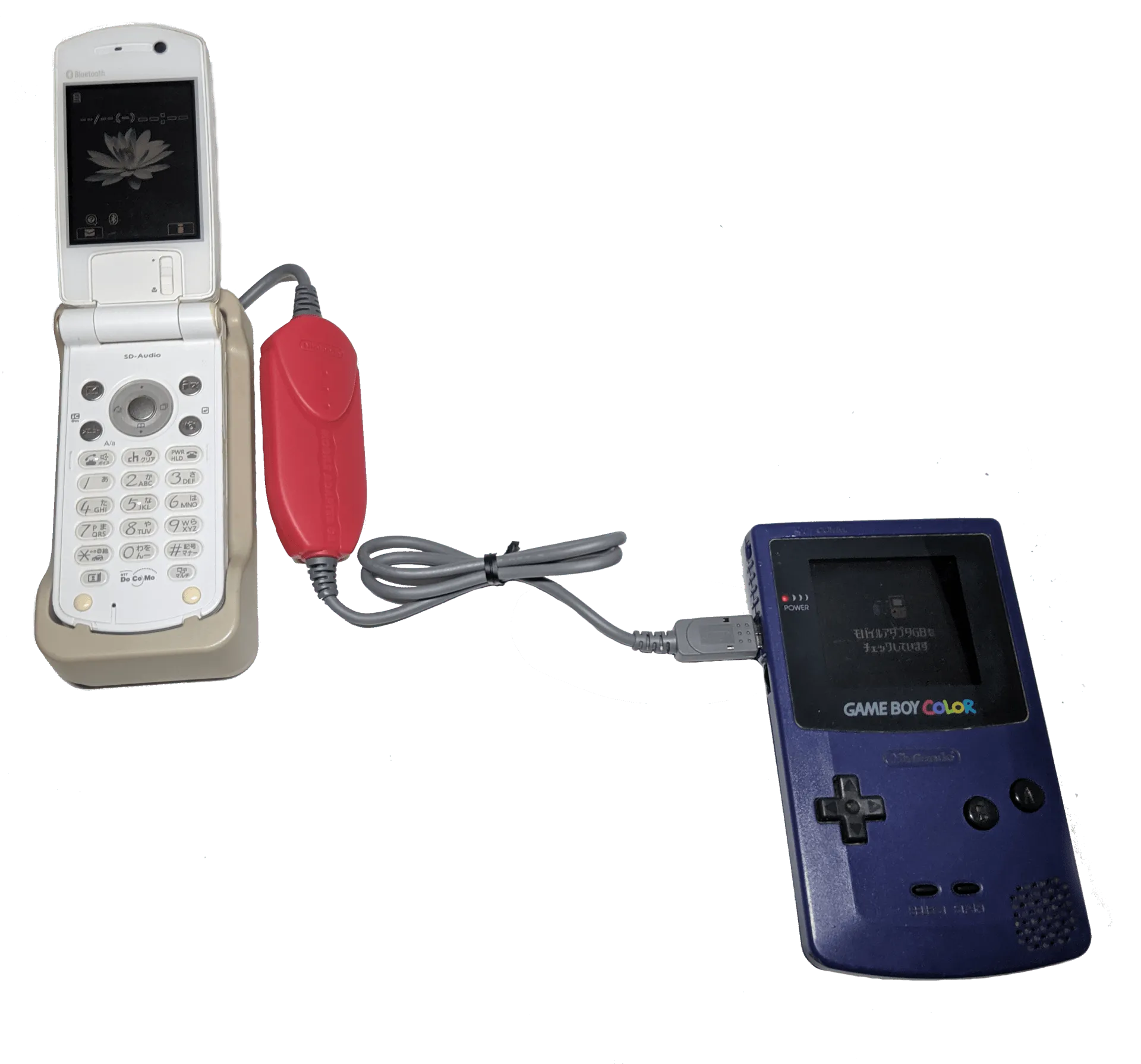
Players with the Mobile Adapter GB adapter could connect to the Mobile System GB service to trade and battle Pokémon online

The Japanese release of Pokémon Crystal supported the Mobile Adapter GB, a peripheral device enabling wireless connectivity between a Game Boy Color or Game Boy Advance and a mobile phone for online interactions using the Mobile System GB service. Pokémon Crystal players were provided with various interactive features, including the ability to battle and trade online, access news updates, participate in quizzes, and engage in minigames. Players could also create or download battle replays, which could be transferred to Pokémon Stadium 2 on the Nintendo 64 using a Transfer Pak. A special item was also distributed via Mobile System GB that allowed players to catch the rare Pokémon Celebi. Users were charged a per-minute connection fee, with additional charges ranging from ¥10 to 100 for accessing specific online features, such as battling, trading, and downloading content.

Nintendo had planned to release the Mobile Adapter GB and launch the Mobile System GB service alongside Pokémon Crystal in December, but delays establishing the service pushed the launch back to 27 January 2001. The online interactions of Pokémon Crystal were highly promoted and the game was expected to be the "killer app" for the service.

However, Mobile Adapter GB would prove to not be a commercial success, selling 80,000 units in its first year on the market. Nintendo opted against an international release of the accessory. The Mobile System GB service was discontinued after less than two years on 18 December 2002. Users could continue to use the peer-to-peer functions of game enabled by the Mobile Adapter GB that did not require connecting to the Mobile System GB service.

== Plot ==
The setting and story of Crystal remains largely the same as in Gold and Silver, with the player seeking to raise and battle Pokémon to defeat the Johto Gym Leaders and Elite Four to be the Johto League Champion. However, several encounters and additional characters are introduced to the overarching narrative. Crystal features a greater role for Legendary Pokémon, with the player awakening Suicune, Entei, and Raikou, and encountering them at various stages of the game. The plotline features a new character, Eusine, who has been searching for Suicune, providing the player with a more direct and narrative pathway to battling and capturing Suicune and the remainder of the game's Legendary Pokémon. Crystal also includes minor changes to how the player encounters the Gym Leader Clair, and additions to the role of the Pokémon Unown in the Ruins of Alph, with players able to complete additional puzzles to receive rewards and messages from the Unown.

== Development and release ==
Crystal was developed by Game Freak in 1999 following the release of Pokémon Gold and Silver. Crystal was the first Pokémon game to feature Junichi Masuda as a lead director, who had previously been a composer for the Pokémon franchise and sub-director for Gold and Silver. Nintendo initially announced development of Crystal and the Mobile Adapter GB in December 1999, with the game developed under the working title of Pokémon X. Artist Ken Sugimori stated that Crystal was primarily developed to support Nintendo's launch of the Mobile System GB service. Masuda noted that the title of the game was intended to be associated with the "crystals used in electronic transmissions". Nintendo president Hiroshi Yamauchi stated that "Pokémon, which incorporates elements of exchange and 'collection', would be the best way to get people to understand the new genre of games that use mobile phones."

Nintendo first previewed Crystal and the Mobile Adapter GB at Space World in August 2000. Crystal was released in Japan on 14 December 2000. Nintendo previewed the release of Crystal for North America at E3 in May 2001, and released the game in North America on 30 July 2001, Australia on 30 September 2001, and Europe on 2 November 2001. Promotional releases of Crystal in North America included packaging of the game with lime green models of the Game Boy Color, sold as the Pokémon Crystal Bundle.

Crystal was made available on the Nintendo eShop for the Nintendo 3DS line of handheld consoles on 28 January 2018.

== Reception ==
Reception

Aggregate score
Aggregator	Score
GameRankings	80%

Review scores
Publication	Score
Electronic Gaming Monthly	7.0 / 7.5 / 3.5
Famitsu	9/10, 8/10, 8/10, 9/10
GameSpot	8.4/10
IGN	9/10
Nintendo Life	9/10
Nintendo Power	4/5
RPGFan	70%
Game Boy Xtreme	80%
Nintendo Gamer	88%
Pocket Games	8/10

Critical reception to Pokémon Crystal upon release was generally positive, with reviewers praising the variety of additional features added to the game. Writing for GameSpot, Frank Provo stated that the game's additions provide "a great deal of value", highlighting the features that "enhance and broaden the game's overall variety", including timed events, quality of life improvements and visual embellishments. Nintendo Power highlighted the addition of the Battle Tower, finding the feature a "truly challenging" addition that would appeal to "hard-core fans". Kelly Starr of Nintendo Gamer found "enough little differences" to make the game a "worthwhile addition," directing praise at the ability to play as a female trainer, the inclusion of location signs, and the enhanced animations.

Many critics considered the additions to Crystal insubstantial and difficult to distinguish from Gold and Silver. Craig Harris of IGN noted the game featured improvements to the overall design," but found the cosmetic changes to be "very little", expressing frustration that the title was the "same game engine" that had been used for several years. Simon Brew of Game Boy Xtreme found "little else on offer" for long-time players, remarking that the game "stretched the traditional formula as far as it could go". Chris Johnston for Electronic Gaming Monthly stated the additions "don't alter the game-playing experience at all," suggesting the changes should have been part of the original game. Chris Thompson of Pocket Games conceded that the game was an "excellent" introduction for new players, but its additions were insufficient to justify a repeat purchase.

=== Sales ===
Although Pokémon Crystal was not as commercially successful as Gold and Silver and remains the lowest-selling main series Pokémon game to date, partly due to reduced interest in enhanced versions, it still achieved notable sales, ranking among the top ten best-selling Game Boy titles. Across all markets, Crystal sold 6.3 million units compared to the 23.7 million copies of Gold and Silver.

Upon its release in Japan, the game topped weekly sales charts and sold a total of 1,871,307 copies, making it the second-best-selling Game Boy Color game in the country. Internationally, Crystal was the best-selling Nintendo title for Game Boy consoles in January 2002, and remained in Nintendo Power top ten charts throughout the year. In the United States, it reportedly sold 600,000 units within the first two weeks of release.

== Legacy ==
Retrospective reviews of Crystal have praised the game as one of the best titles in the Pokémon franchise. Darryn Bonthuys of GameSpot stated Crystal was "the definitive Pokémon game of the Game Boy era" and one of the best Game Boy Color titles, highlighting its "revolutionary" animations and story. Chris Tapsell of Eurogamer praised Crystal as "the best Pokémon game" due to its "peerless artistry", and the "quaint, restricted painterly presentation" of its animations. Arjun Joshi of Nintendo Life remarked that Crystal "(added) even more life to an already vibrant game", praising the game's animations and "captivating and memorable" additions to the game's plot.

Many reviewers have also observed that Crystal pioneered features that would become standard in successive Pokémon games, including the pattern of an enhanced version following the release of the primary games in a generation, the selection of the player character's gender, an overarching narrative featuring chosen one themes, and the inclusion of a Battle Tower feature. Tomas Franzese of Dual Shockers notes that the game was important in establishing "multiple precedents" for the series and its future direction. Nintendo Power commented that whilst the innovation of the Mobile Adapter GB was confined to the Japanese market, its design also served as a major influence for portable networking features of later Nintendo products, including the Game Boy Advance Wireless Adapter and Nintendo DS.

Some writers have also expressed that Crystal assisted the franchise to maintain appeal during a transitional period. Arana Judith of Well Played characterised Crystal as the end point of the original vision and design for the franchise due the end of the Game Boy Color life cycle and the increasing fatigue with Pokémon in popular culture. This fatigue was reflected by contemporary critics who had predicted that Crystal arrived at a waning point of interest in the franchise. Judith wrote that whilst Ruby and Sapphire would reinforce the longevity of the series, the game was released in the context of the general public "seeing Pokémon merchandise fade from shelves" suggesting that "the Pokémania that had swept those last years of the 20th century was truly on its way out". Rhiannon Bevan of TechRaptor considered the game's additions were bold and laid the groundwork for what allowed the series to retain enduring popularity.

Crystal has received retrospective praise for the inclusive impact of a player character with a selectable gender. Writing for Polygon, Juno Stump stated Pokémon Crystal and Kris "impacted [girls] greatly, allowing us to finally see ourselves in a video game and on our very own Pokémon adventure." Clare McBride of Syfy Wire believed the game was impactful for women, stating "Instead of having to name a clearly male character our names and just roll with it, we got explicitly invited into the Pokémon space we'd already been inhabiting." Although the intent of the feature was to "appeal to cisgender girls", Anya Archer of Wired commented on the appeal to transgender audiences of being able to play as a character whose gender does not reflect the one assigned at birth.

On 2 March 2014, Crystal was played by Twitch Plays Pokémon, an interactive experience allowing users of the video game live streaming service Twitch to influence the play of the game through input commands in the chat box. The game featured the same protagonist and Pokémon to develop a continuity with the previous stream. The stream experienced criticism due to the involvement of players attempting to imitate high-stakes moments in the first stream, such as the release of Pokémon using the PC, as well as the temporary introduction of features that were abandoned, including changes to the "Democracy" and "Anarchy" modes. The stream of Crystal was completed in 13 days and 2 hours.
