= Nintendo 64 accessories =

Video game console accessories

Nintendo 64 accessories are first-party Nintendo hardware—and third-party hardware, licensed and unlicensed—intended for use with the Nintendo 64, which was released in 1996. Nintendo's first-party accessories are mainly transformative system expansions: the 64DD Internet multimedia platform, with a floppy drive, video capture and editing, game designer, web browser, and online service; the controller plus its own expansions for storage, data transfer, and vibration; and the RAM-boosting Expansion Pak for improvements in graphics and gameplay. Third-party accessories include the essential game developer tools built for Nintendo by Silicon Graphics, Intelligent Systems, Kyoto Microcomputer Co.,Ltd. and SN Systems, an unlicensed SharkWire Online service, and unlicensed cheaper counterparts to first-party items.

== First-party ==
First-party Nintendo 64 accessories have a product code prefixed with NUS, short for the console's pre-release name, "Nintendo Ultra Sixty-four".

=== Controller ===
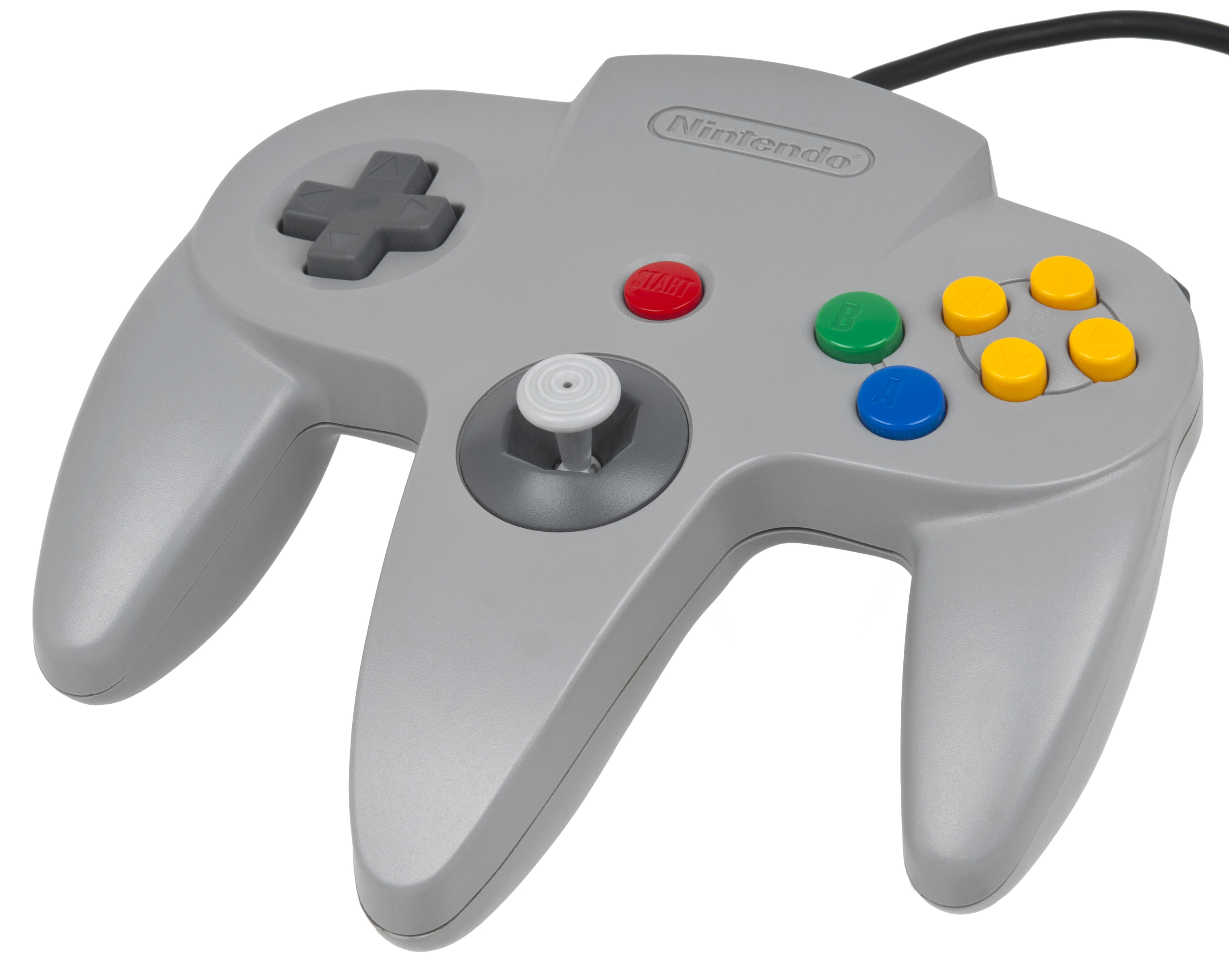
A gray Nintendo 64 controller

The Nintendo 64 controller (NUS-005) features a distinctive "M"-shaped design, with a "control stick", making Nintendo the first manufacturer to include a thumbstick as a standard feature in its primary controller. It is functionally identical to an analog stick, but the control stick is digital, with the inner mechanism working more like a ball mouse.

The controller includes a D-pad and ten buttons: a large A and B button, a Start button, four C-buttons (Up, Down, Left, and Right), two shoulder buttons (L and R), and a Z trigger positioned on the back. A port on the bottom of the controller allows users to connect other accessories, including the Controller Pak, the Rumble Pak, and the Transfer Pak.

=== AC Power supply ===
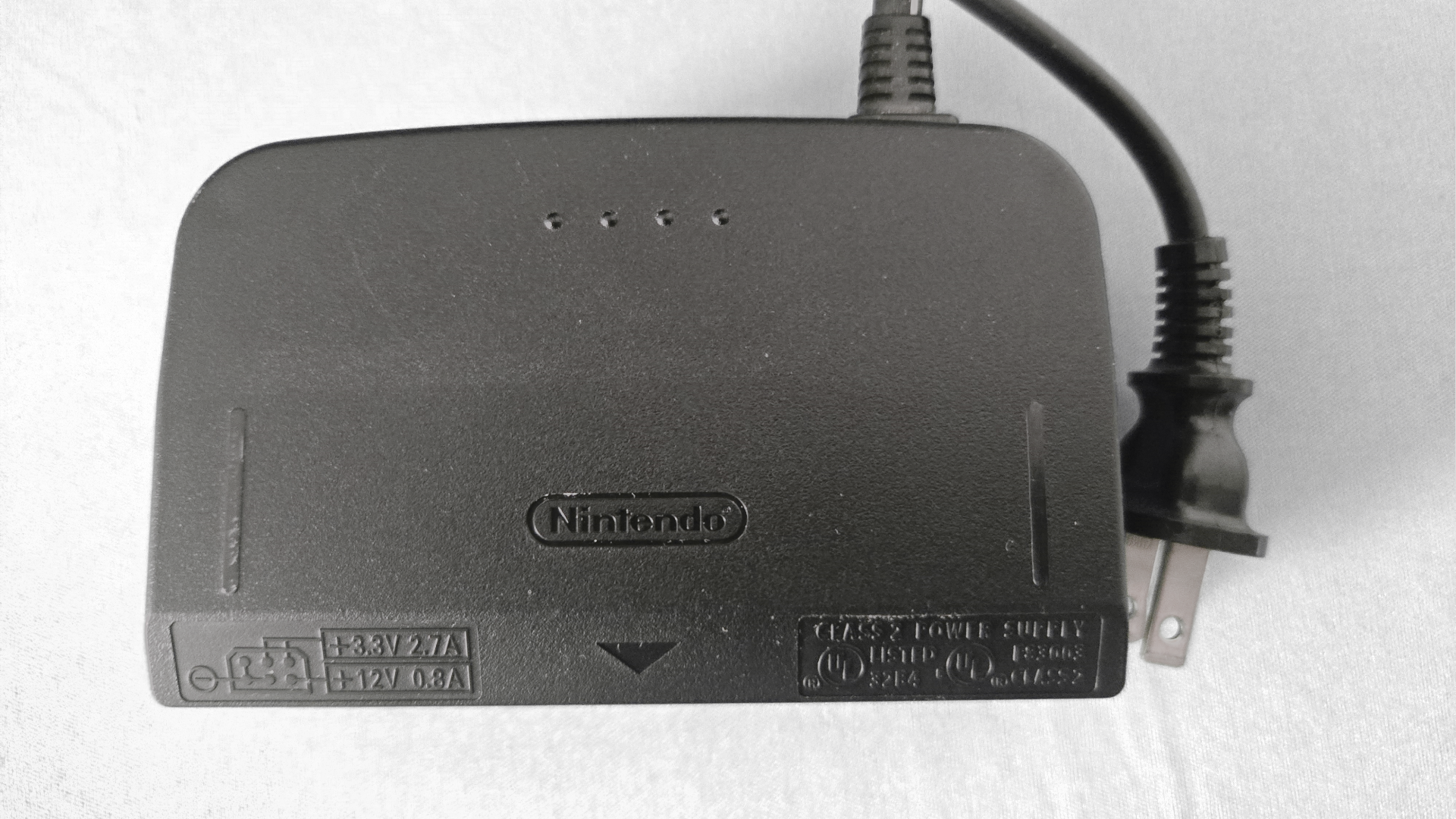
North American AC Power Supply

The AC Power Supply (NUS-002, UKV-EUR-AUS-JPN-USA) is packaged with the Nintendo 64 and provides electricity to the Control Deck.

=== Jumper Pak ===
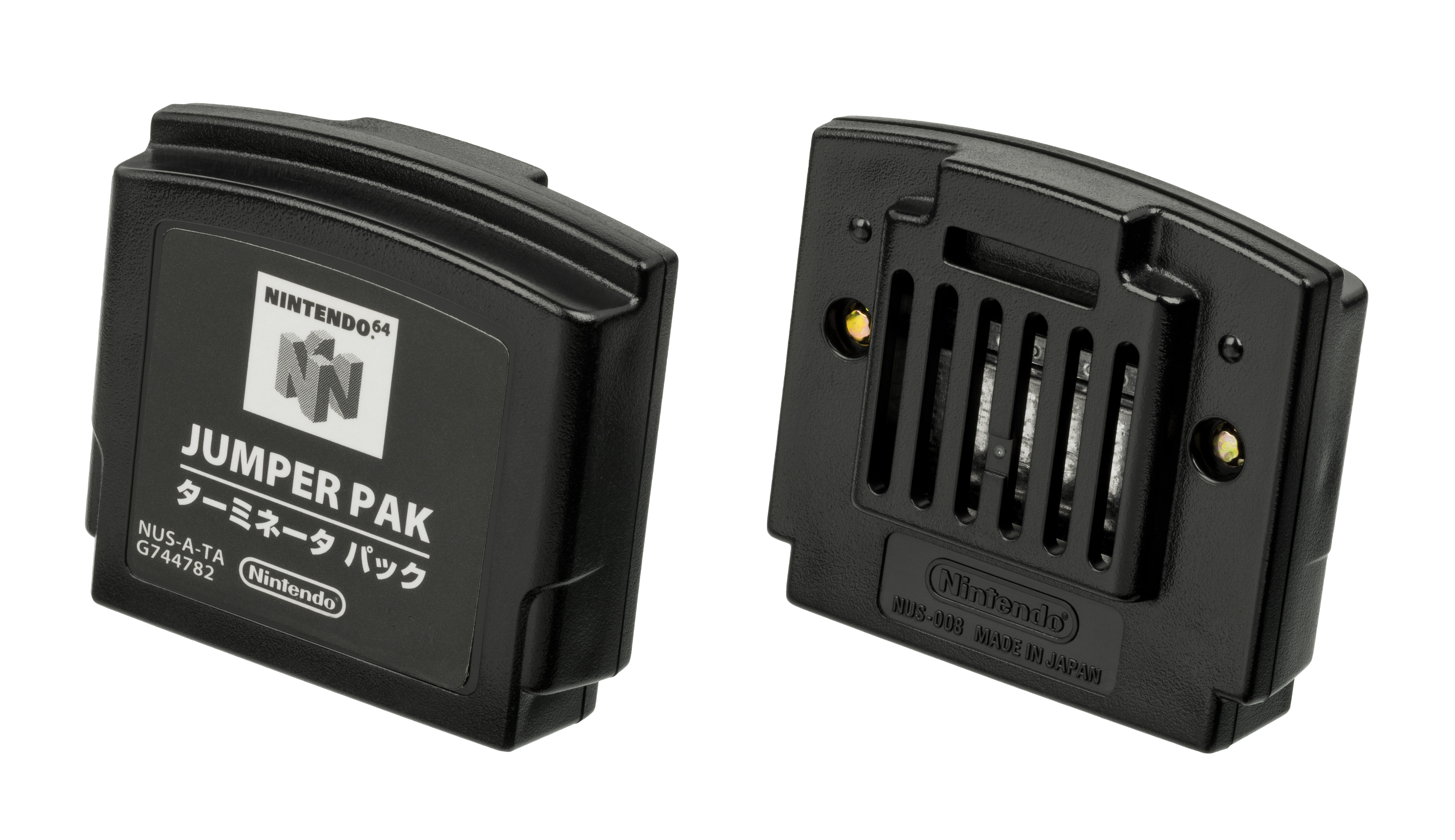
Jumper Pak

The Jumper Pak (Note: Known in Japan as Terminator Pack (ターミネータ パック, Tāminēta Pakku)) (NUS-008) is a filler module that plugs into the Nintendo 64's memory expansion port. It serves no functional purpose beyond terminating the RDRAM (Rambus DRAM) bus when the Expansion Pak is not installed. The console will not boot if a Jumper Pak or Expansion Pak is not present.

Rambus memory controllers require memory modules to be installed in pairs, with any unused slots needing continuity modules like the Jumper Pak. These modules do not provide additional memory; instead, they ensure proper signal propagation by directing signals to termination resistors. Without them, signals would reflect, causing instability.

Most Nintendo 64 consoles were shipped with the Jumper Pak pre-installed.

=== RF Switch and RF Modulator ===
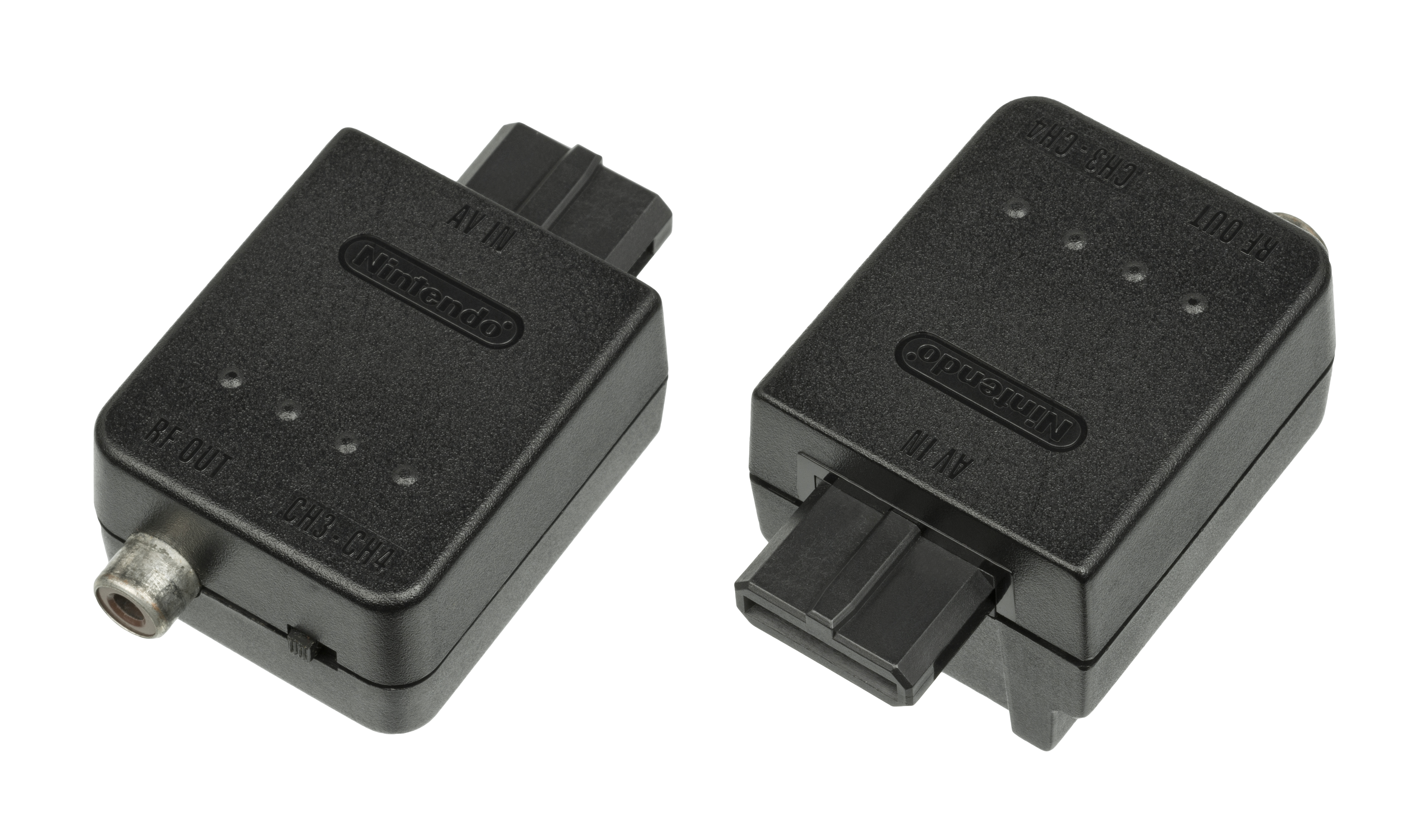
RF Modulator for SNES, Nintendo 64, and GameCube

The RF Switch and RF Modulator (NUS-009 and NUS-003) connect the Nintendo 64 to the television through RF. They are primarily intended for older televisions that lack AV cable support. The accessories are also compatible with the NES, SNES, and GameCube.

=== Controller Pak ===
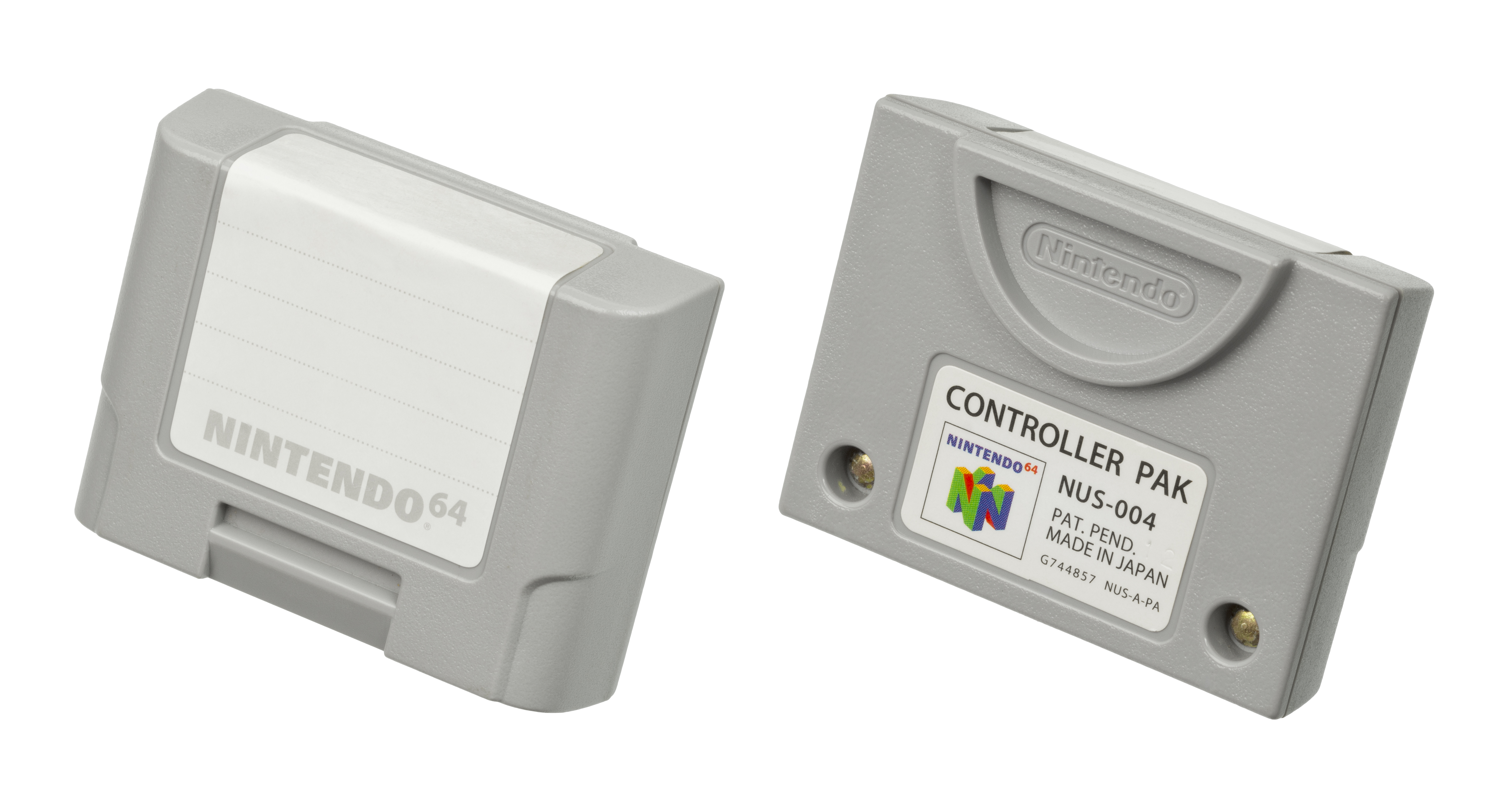
Controller Pak

The Controller Pak (Note: コントローラパック, Kontorōra Pakku) (NUS-004) is the console's memory card, comparable to those of the PlayStation and GameCube. Compatible games can save player data to the Controller Pak, which plugs into the bottom of the Nintendo 64 controller, as do the Rumble Pak and Transfer Pak. The Controller Pak was marketed for exchanging data between Nintendo 64 owners, because data on the game cartridge cannot be transferred.

The original models from Nintendo have 256 kilobits (32 kilobytes) of CR2032 battery backed SRAM, split into 123 pages, but third-party models have much more, often in the form of multiple selectable memory banks of 32 KB. Games occupy varying numbers of pages, sometimes using the entire card.

Upon launch, the Controller Pak was initially useful, and even necessary for early games. Over time, the Controller Pak lost popularity to the convenience of a battery backed SRAM or EEPROM in some cartridges. Because the Nintendo 64 Game Pak format also allows saving data on supported cartridges, few first-party and second-party games use the Controller Pak. The vast majority are from third-party developers, most likely due to potentially increased production and retail costs caused by including storage chips on the cartridge. Some games use it to save optional data that is too large for the cartridge, such as Mario Kart 64 (1997), which uses 121 of the total 123 pages for storing ghost data, or International Superstar Soccer 64 (1996), which uses the entire cartridge's space for its save data. Tony Hawk's Pro Skater (2000) uses 11 pages. Quest 64 (1998) and Mystical Ninja Starring Goemon (1997) use the Controller Pak exclusively for saved data. The Japan-only game Animal Forest (2001) uses the Controller Pak to travel to other towns. Animal Forest can also play Famicom games from a Controller Pak, though only one game, Ice Climber, was released via this method through magazine giveaways.

Following the 1996 Christmas shopping season, Next Generation reported "impressive sales of the memory pack cartridges despite the lack of available games to take advantage of the $19.99 units".

=== Euro Connector Plug ===
The Euro Connector Plug is an adaptor packaged with European releases of the console, which converts RCA composite and stereo cable inputs to Composite SCART.

=== Rumble Pak ===
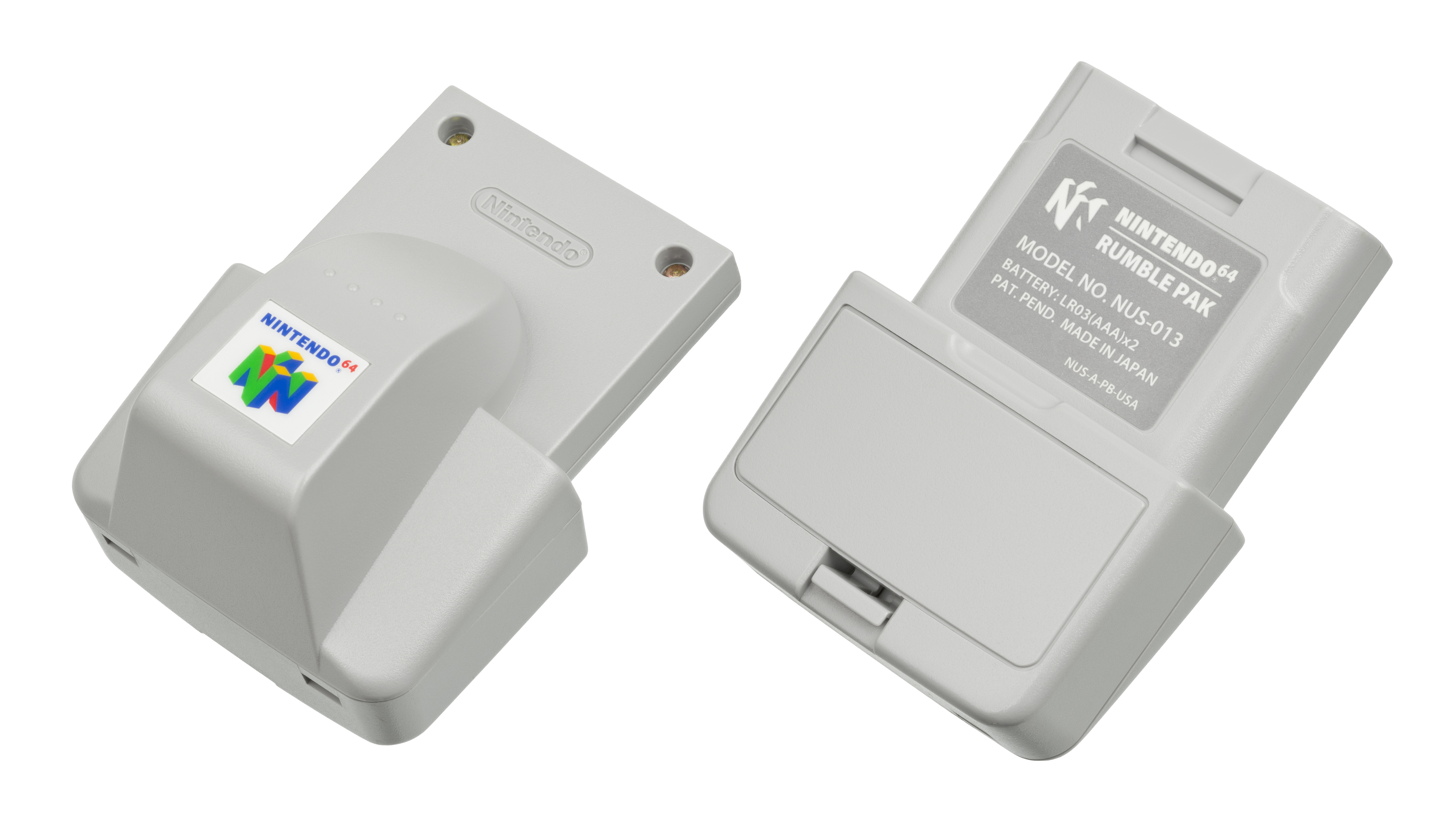
Rumble Pak

The Rumble Pak (Note: 振動パック, Shindō Pakku) (NUS-013) provides haptic vibration while playing video games, enhancing player immersion by delivering vibration at key moments, such as when firing a weapon or taking damage. It was released alongside Star Fox 64 (1997), with which it was originally bundled, and later became available as a stand-alone accessory. Like the Controller Pak and Transfer Pak, it plugs into the expansion port on the bottom of the Nintendo 64 controller.

=== Cleaning Kit ===
The cleaning kit (NUS-014, NUS-015, and NUS-016) contains materials to clean the connectors of the Control Deck, controllers, Game Paks, Rumble Paks, and Controller Paks.

=== Transfer Pak ===
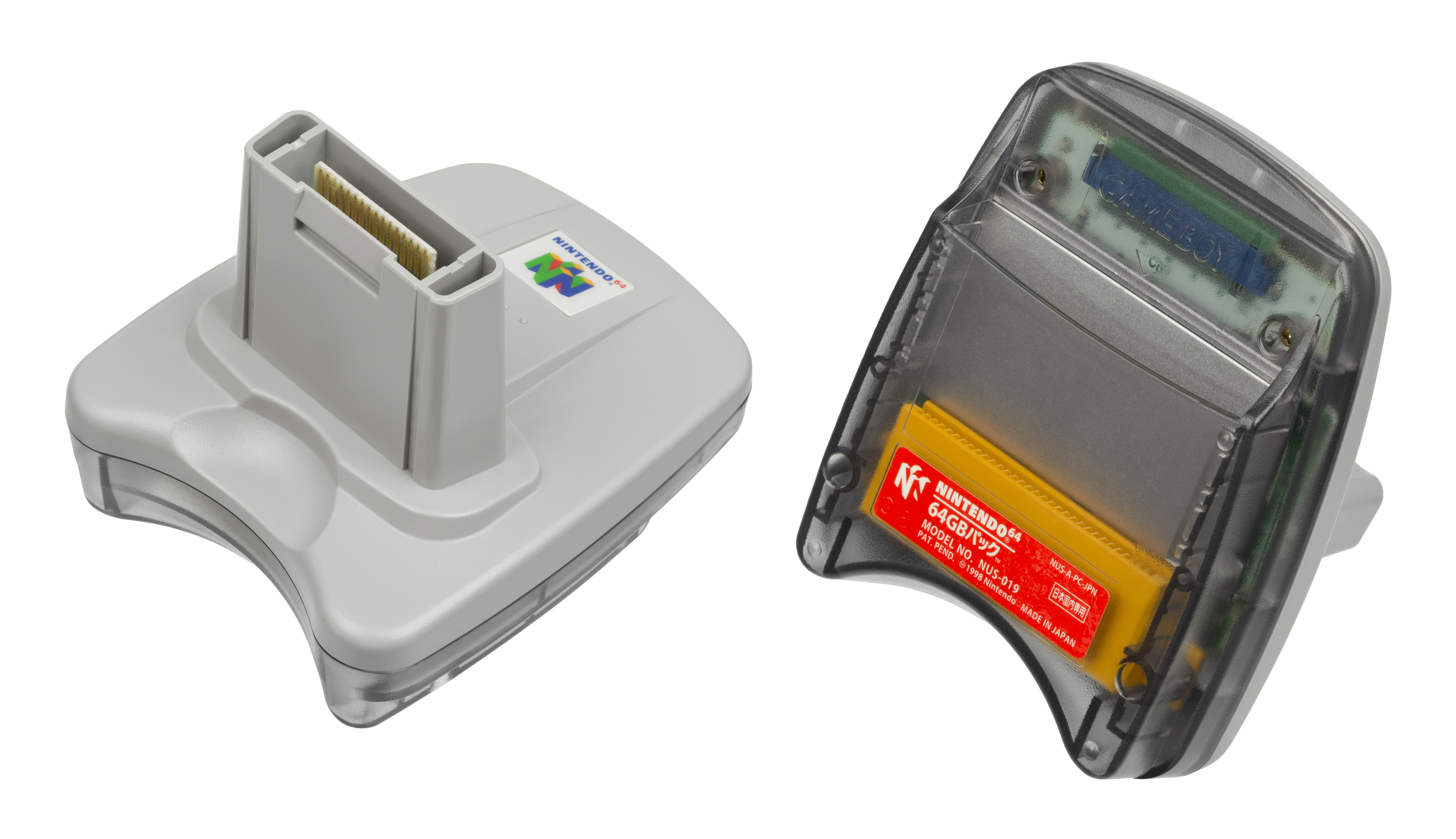
Transfer Pak

The Transfer Pak (Note: Known in Japan as 64 GB Pack (64GBパック, Rokujūyon Jī Bī Pakku)) (NUS-019) plugs into the controller to transfer data between supported Nintendo 64 games and Game Boy or Game Boy Color games. It was released in Japan in August 1998, bundled with the game Pocket Monsters' Stadium, and in North America and Europe in March and April 2000 respectively, where it was similarly bundled with Pokémon Stadium.

=== VRU ===
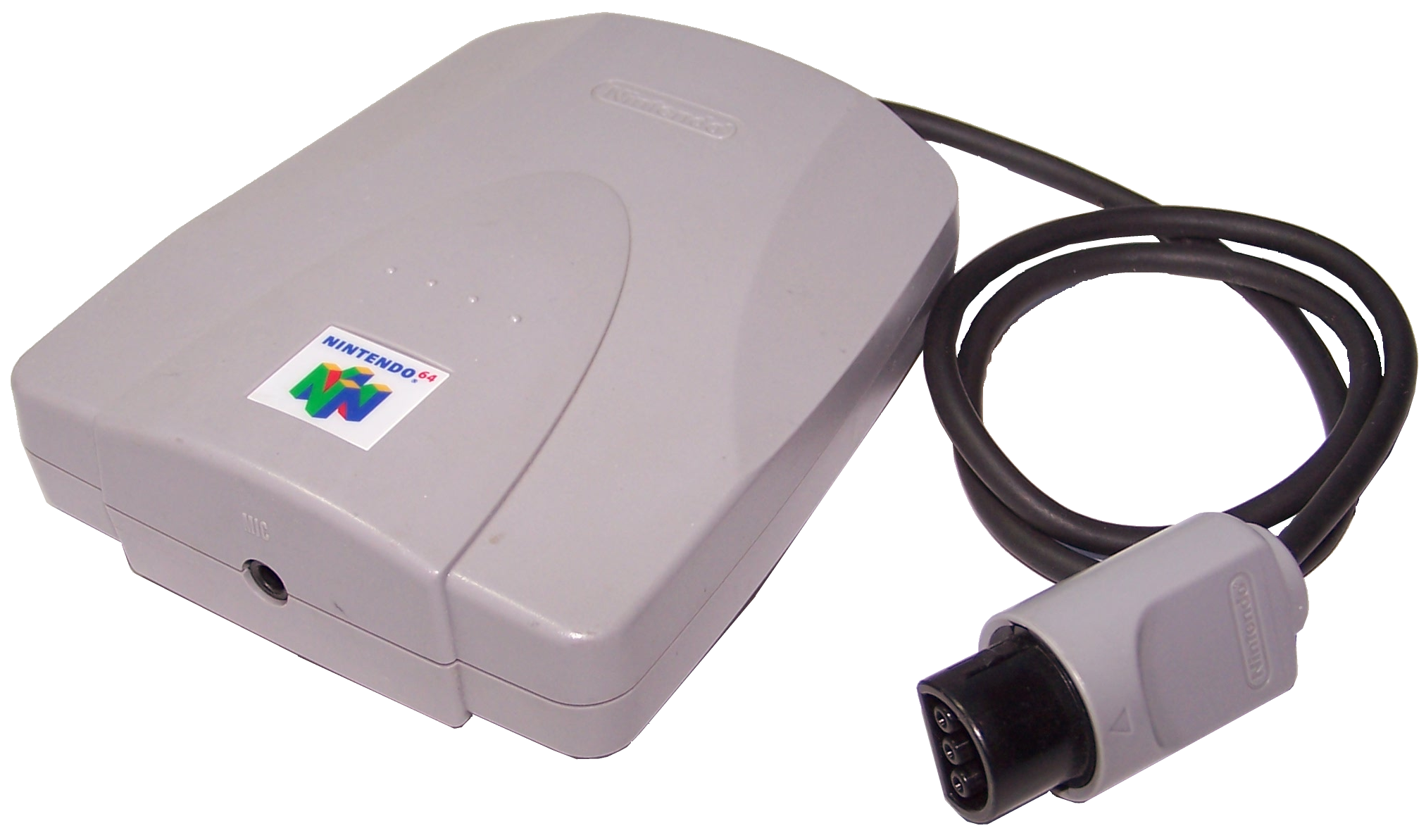
The VRU (Voice Recognition Unit) ballast

The Voice Recognition Unit (VRU), known as the Voice Recognition System (VRS) in Japan, is compatible with only two games: Hey You, Pikachu! (1998) and Densha de Go! 64 (1999). Both games were packaged with the VRU, but Hey You, Pikachu! is the only game requiring it. The VRU consists of a ballast (NUS-020) connected to controller port 4, a microphone (NUS-021), a yellow foam cover for the microphone, and a clip for clipping the microphone to the controller (NUS-025, bundled with Hey You, Pikachu!) or a plastic neck holder for hands-free usage (NUS-022, bundled with Densha de Go! 64). The VRU is calibrated for best recognition of a high-pitched voice, such as a small child's, and other voices are less likely be recognized properly by the VRU. The Legend of Zelda: Majora's Mask (2000) was originally intended to include VRU functionality, but this feature was removed from the final game. The accessory was also planned to be used by the cancelled games VRS Racer and Teo 64DD. Some fan projects have introduced custom VRU support into games.

VRUs are region dependent, and foreign region VRUs are not detected by the games. No VRU compatible game was launched in the EUR region (PAL, Europe), so there is no EUR-region VRU. Microphone accessories would be released for later Nintendo systems, including the GameCube Microphone and Wii Speak, while other systems such as the Nintendo DS and Nintendo 3DS would have a microphone built in.

=== Expansion Pak ===
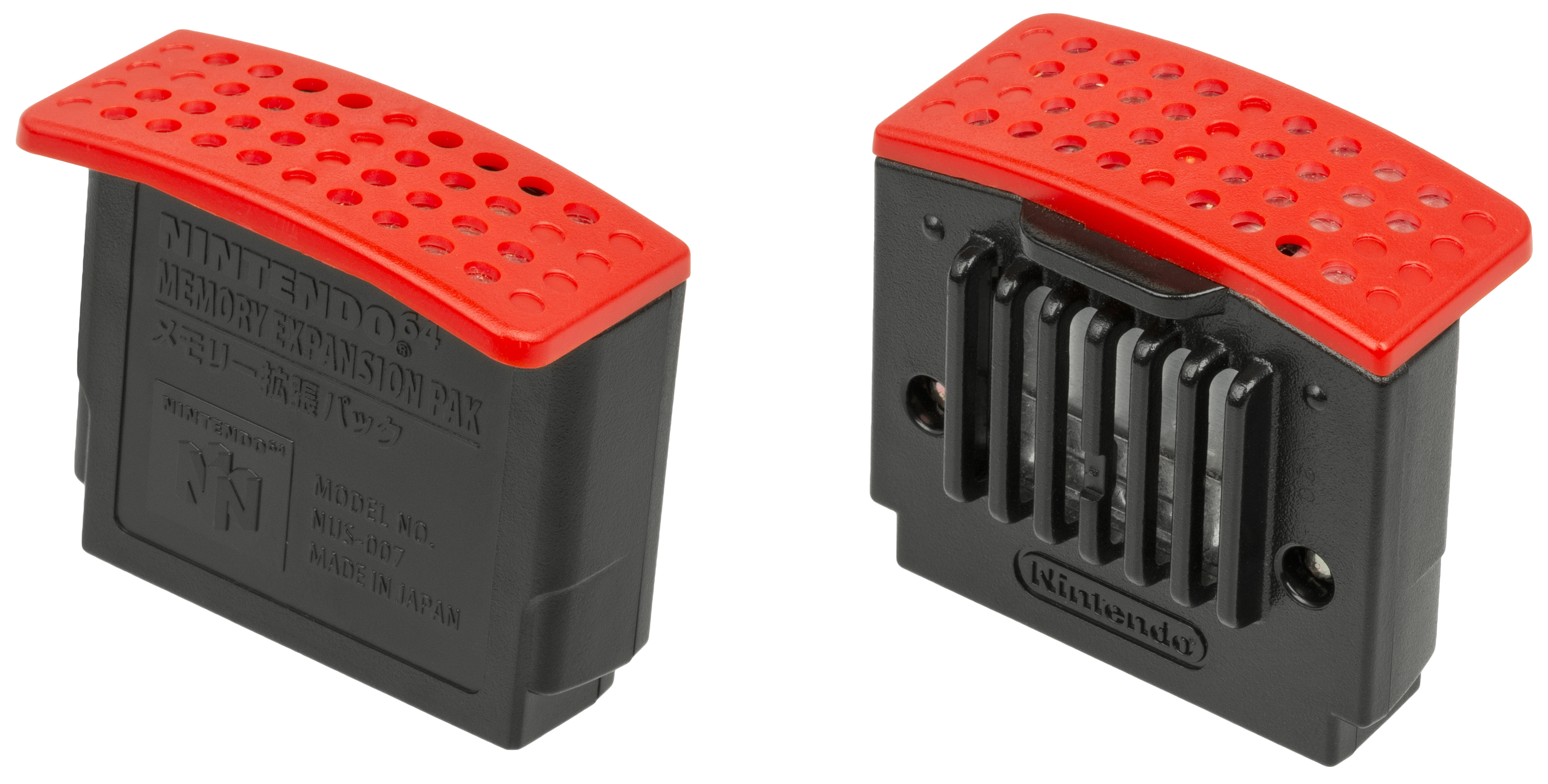
The 4 MB memory Expansion Pak

The Expansion Pak (Note: 拡張パック, Kakuchō Pakku) (NUS-007) adds 4 MB of RDRAM (Rambus DRAM), the same type of memory as the console's onboard RAM, doubling the system's total memory from 4 MB to 8 MB. It installs into the console's memory expansion port, replacing the pre-installed Jumper Pak.

The Expansion Pak was initially developed for the 64DD to support its multimedia applications, but was instead released separately in late 1998, and was later bundled with the 64DD's delayed launch in Japan in December 1999. The accessory was bundled with Donkey Kong 64 (1999) and Japanese versions of The Legend of Zelda: Majora's Mask (2000) and Perfect Dark (2000).

The Expansion Pak was packaged with an ejector tool (NUS-012) to assist in removing the original Jumper Pak.

Game developers leveraged the increased memory for improved visuals, gameplay, and performance. Some games require the Expansion Pak, including Donkey Kong 64, The Legend of Zelda: Majora's Mask, and all 64DD software. Others restrict access to certain content without it. For example, the Expansion Pak is necessary to play the single-player campaign in Perfect Dark, with the game's packaging stating that only "approximately 35%" of the game is available without it. In StarCraft 64 (2000), the Expansion Pak is required to play the Brood War expansion.

IGN praised the Expansion Pak for delivering an "immediate and noticeable" impact on supported games, making it one of the most influential add-ons for the Nintendo 64.

However, the Expansion Pak can introduce compatibility issues in some games. Space Station Silicon Valley (1998) may crash in certain areas when the Expansion Pak is installed.

Games that support the Expansion Pak
Title	Pak required	Notes
40 Winks	No	Adds high-res letterbox (480×232i) and high-res (480×360i) modes.
Aidyn Chronicles: The First Mage	No	Enables a "high resolution" setting, changes certain music tracks, and adds foliage to maps. Its absence enables behind-the-scenes memory management features.
All-Star Baseball 2000	No	Enables longer replays in the replay feature.
All-Star Baseball 2001	No	
Armorines: Project S.W.A.R.M.	No	Adds high-res letterbox (480×232i) and high-res (480×360i) modes, accessible from pause menu.
Army Men: Air Combat	No	
Army Men: Sarge's Heroes	No	
Army Men: Sarge's Heroes 2	No	
Battlezone: Rise of the Black Dogs	No	
Castlevania: Legacy of Darkness	No	Enables the option to turn on "Hi-Res" mode (490×355i).
Command & Conquer	No	Makes the "high" battlefield resolution option in in-game options menu available, which engages a high-res interlaced mode.
Daikatana	No	Adds a "hi-res" interlaced letterbox mode, accessible from main menu.
Donald Duck: Goin' Quackers	No	Enables high resolution mode.
Donkey Kong 64	Yes	Marketed as improving the frame rate and object rendering at a distance. According to Rare programmer Chris Marlow, the company could not resolve a bug that occurred without the Expansion Pak and thus was forced, at great expense, to bundle the game with it. However, lead artist Mark Stevenson called Marlow's story a "myth" and said that the Expansion Pak was committed to early in development. Though such a bug did exist towards the end of development, according to Stevenson, "the Expansion Pak wasn't introduced to deal with this and wasn't the solution to the problem." Nintendo said that the bundle would avoid consumer confusion.
Duke Nukem: Zero Hour	No	Adds interlaced medium and high-res modes, accessible from main menu options.
Excitebike 64	No	Enables high-res mode. Only the PAL version signifies its Expansion Pak compatibility on the box.
F-1 World Grand Prix II	No	Enables a full race replay.
FIFA 99	No	Enables an unadvertised "Super High" resolution mode of 640×480i.
Gauntlet Legends	No	Required for 4-player multiplayer.
Hybrid Heaven	No	Enables high-res letterbox and high-res (640×474i) modes, accessible from main menu options.
Hydro Thunder	No	Required for 3 and 4 player multiplayer.
Indiana Jones and the Infernal Machine	No	Enables high-res mode of 400×440i and unlocks level 13, "King Sol's Mines".
International Superstar Soccer 2000	No	Enables high-resolution textures but at reduced performance.
International Track & Field 2000	No	
Jeremy McGrath Supercross 2000	No	
Ken Griffey, Jr.'s Slugfest	No	Enables high-res mode.
The Legend of Zelda: Majora's Mask	Yes	One of the two released non-64DD game completely designed for the Expansion Pak, to increase texture detail, remove fog that is prevalent in Ocarina of Time, increase number of on-screen models, and add effects such as motion blur.
Madden NFL 2000	No	
Madden NFL 2001	No	
Madden NFL 2002	No	
NBA Jam 2000	No	Only the PAL version signifies its Expansion Pak compatibility on the box.
NFL Quarterback Club '99	No	
NFL Quarterback Club 2000	No	
Nuclear Strike 64	No	Adds a progressive "medium" resolution mode, accessible from main menu options.
Perfect Dark	Required for story mode	The Expansion Pak is required for the single player, co-operative, and counter-operative campaigns, and most multiplayer features. It also adds an optional high-res mode accessible via pause menu, increasing the resolution to 640×222p (from 320×222p) in NTSC, and 448×268p (from 320×268p) in PAL. However, the Japanese version fully requires the Expansion Pak.
Pokémon Stadium 2	No	States "Expansion Pak Detected" on the Start screen, increases render resolution to 640×480i, and improves resolution of some textures.
Quake II	No	Increases framebuffer color depth, removes dithering, turns off screen blur, and slightly increases framerate.
Rayman 2: The Great Escape	No	Adds a progressive high-res mode, accessible from pause menu.
Re-Volt	No	Adds an interlaced "medium resolution" mode, accessible from pause menu.
Resident Evil 2	No	Increased resolution and texture detail, switching between various progressive and interlaced resolutions on a per-screen basis.
Road Rash 64	No	Adds letterboxed, widescreen, and high-res progressive modes, accessible from main menu.
Roadsters	No	
San Francisco Rush 2049	Required for some content	Required for track 6, the Advanced Circuit, changeable rims, some cars and music during Arcade races.
Shadow Man	No	Adds an interlaced high-res mode, accessible from main menu.
Spider-Man	No	
South Park	No	Enables interlaced high-res letterbox and high-res mode options; increases frame rate in low-res mode.
StarCraft 64	Required for some modes	Required for the Brood War missions and the two player split-screen mode.
Star Wars: Episode I: Battle for Naboo	No	Enables high-res mode, which increases resolution to 400×440i.
Star Wars: Episode 1 Racer	No	Enables high-res mode at 640×480i with higher-resolution textures, and increases the framerate in low-res mode.
Star Wars: Rogue Squadron	No	Enables high-res mode at 400×440i.
The World Is Not Enough	No	Adds a "hi-color" mode, accessible from pause menu, which switches to a higher progressive resolution and turns off the screen noise effect.
Tony Hawk's Pro Skater	No	
Tony Hawk's Pro Skater 2	No	Increases framerate, especially noticeable during multiplayer games.
Tony Hawk's Pro Skater 3	No	
Top Gear Hyper Bike	No	
Top Gear Overdrive	No	Adds "half" and "full" high-res (640×240p) options to main menu setup.
Top Gear Rally 2	No	
Turok 2: Seeds of Evil	No	Adds high-res letterbox (480×232i) and high-res (480×360i) modes, accessible from pause menu.
Turok 3: Shadow of Oblivion	No	Adds high-res letterbox (480×232i) and high-res (480×360i) modes, accessible from pause menu.
Turok: Rage Wars	No	Adds high-res letterbox (480×232i) and high-res (480×360i) modes, accessible from pause menu.
Vigilante 8	No	Adds a high resolution mode (480×360i), accessible from pause menu. A hidden "ultra" mode (640×480i) is added by entering "MAX_RESOLUTION" in the password screen.
Vigilante 8: 2nd Offense	No	Adds a high resolution mode (480×360i), accessible from pause menu. A hidden "ultra" mode (640×480i) is added by entering "GO_MAX_REZ" in the password screen, which is accessed by selecting "Game Status", pressing A twice, then pressing L+R.
Xena: Warrior Princess: The Talisman of Fate	No	

=== 64DD ===
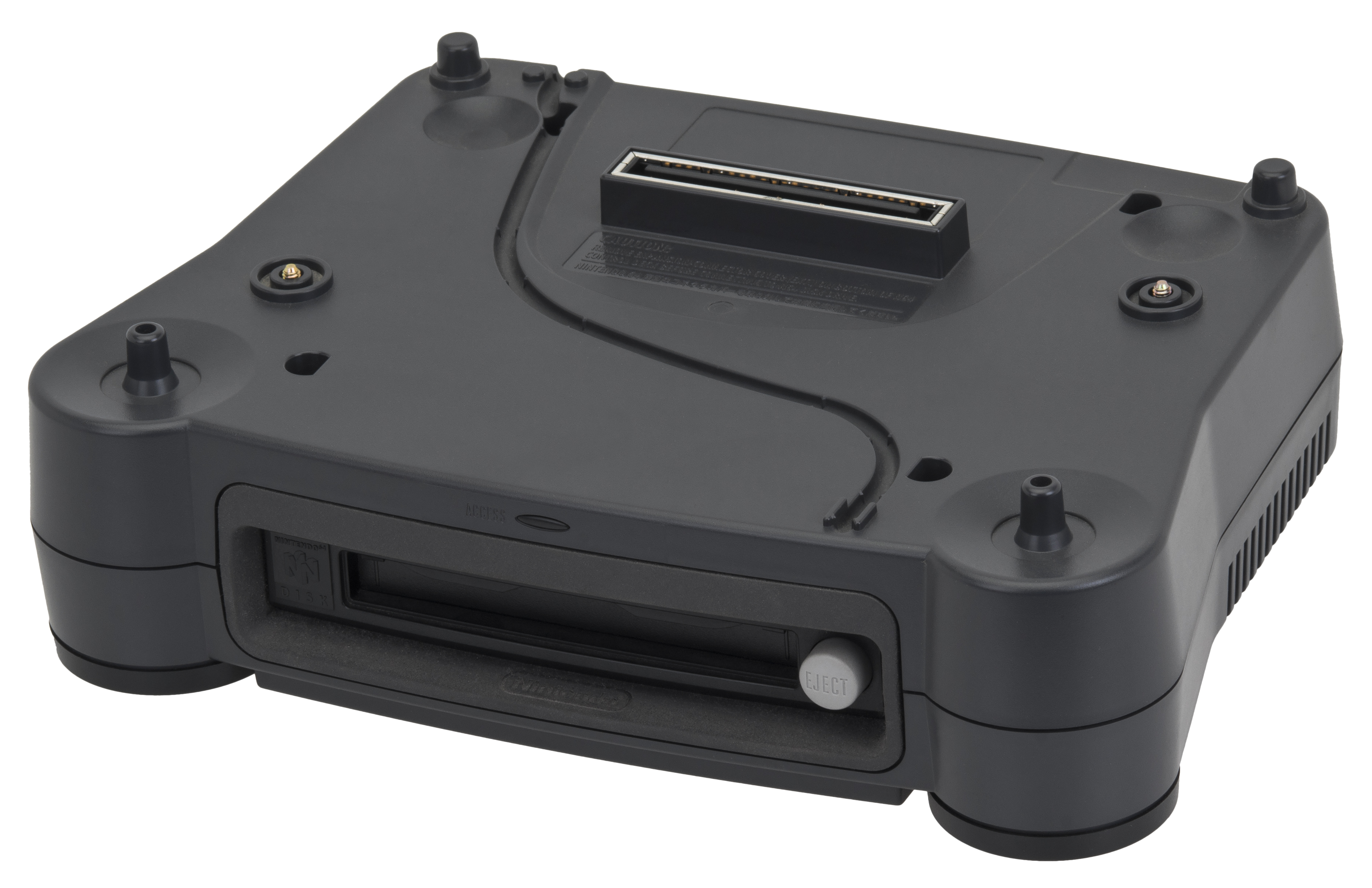
64DD, unattached

The 64DD (NUS-010) is a 64 MB floppy drive with real-time clock, font and audio library in ROM, and a bundle of other accessories and custom games. The peripheral was initially announced in 1995, planned for release in 1997, and repeatedly delayed until its release in December 1999. It was launched alongside a now-defunct online service called Randnet. With nine games released, it was a commercial failure and so was never released outside Japan.

=== Modem ===
The modem cartridge (NUS-029) is a specialized N64 cartridge with a built in modular connector port. It connects at up to 28.8 kbit/s, for the defunct Randnet service and compatible 64DD games and web browser.

=== Mouse ===
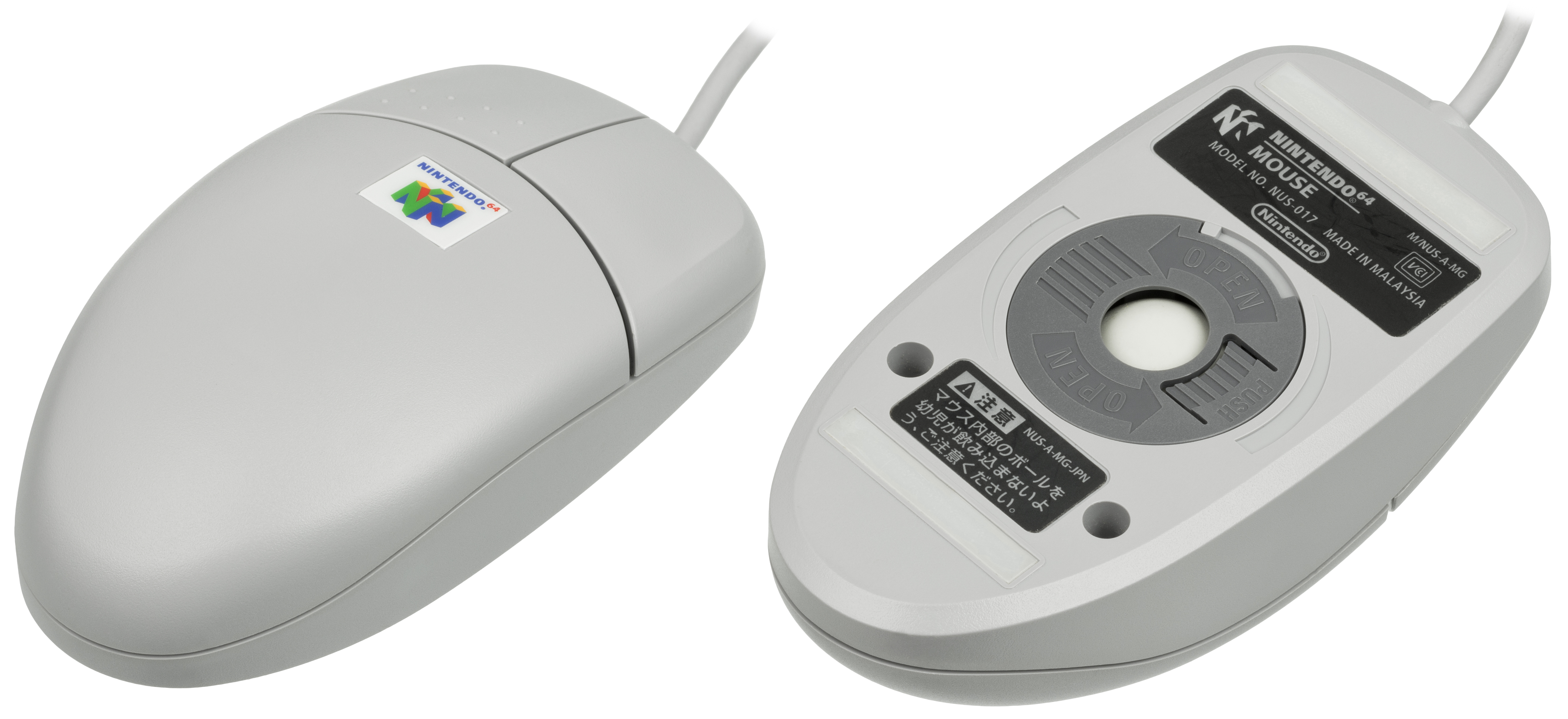
Nintendo 64 mouse

The Nintendo 64 Mouse (NUS-017) was manufactured by Mitsumi and was released only in a bundle with a 64DD launch game, Mario Artist: Paint Studio (1999). It functions similarly to a standard computer mouse and was developed for the 64DD's GUI-based games and applications, such as the Mario Artist suite, SimCity 64 (2000), and the web browser for Nintendo's defunct online service Randnet. Mouse movement imitates the N64 controller's analog stick, and the mouse buttons act as the A and B buttons. This makes the mouse technically compatible with every N64 game, but its functionality is limited due to the missing buttons and method of analog control.

=== Capture Cassette ===
The Nintendo 64 Capture Cassette (NUS-028) is a special Nintendo 64 cartridge with RCA connector audio/video jacks and a phone connector port on the back, which are used to import images and audio into the Mario Artist suite from devices like a VCR or a microphone. It was bundled with the 64DD game Mario Artist: Talent Studio (2000).

=== Keyboard ===
The compact keyboard (RND-001) is for the Randnet service and compatible 64DD games.

=== SmartMedia ===
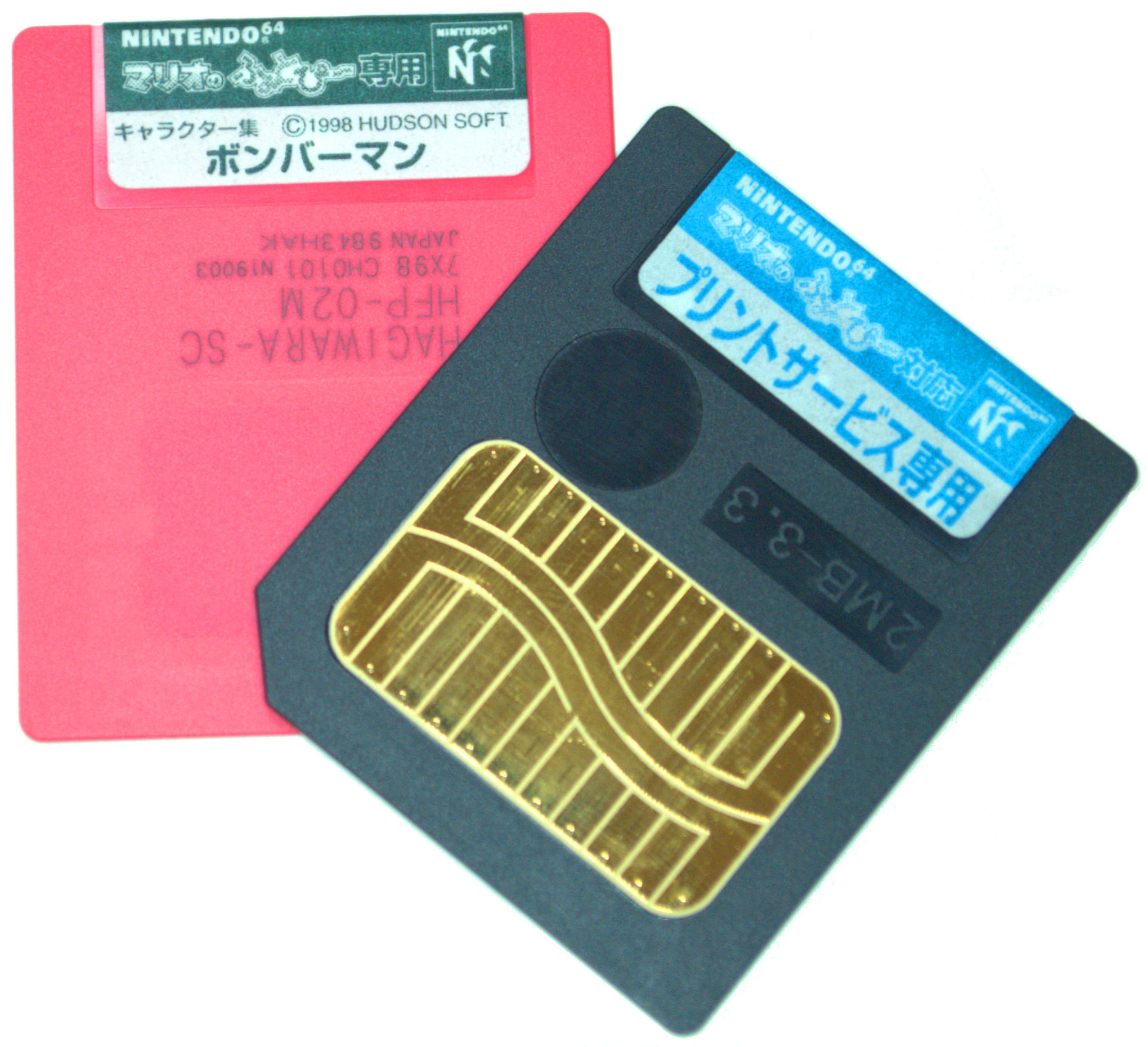
SmartMedia cards plug into the custom Mario no Photopi cartridge.

A set of 10 SmartMedia memory cards were released for Mario no Photopi (1998), containing images, backgrounds, borders, and other media assets for editing the user's photos. They connect to the game via two card slots in the top of the cartridge. The following cards were released:

- Characters collection – Bomberman
- Characters collection – Card Captor Sakura
- Characters collection – Hello Kitty
- Characters collection – Himitsu no Akko-chan
- Characters collection – The Legend of Zelda: Ocarina of Time
- Characters collection – Medarot
- Characters collection – Sylvanian Families
- Characters collection – Yoshi's Story
- Illustrations – Funny accessories
- Illustrations – Postal cards

The cards are all 3.3 V 2 MB SmartMedia memory cards manufactured by Hagiwara Sys-Com. Mario no Photopi was bundled with an empty memory SmartMedia card for storing players' creations.

== Licensed ==
=== Bio Sensor ===
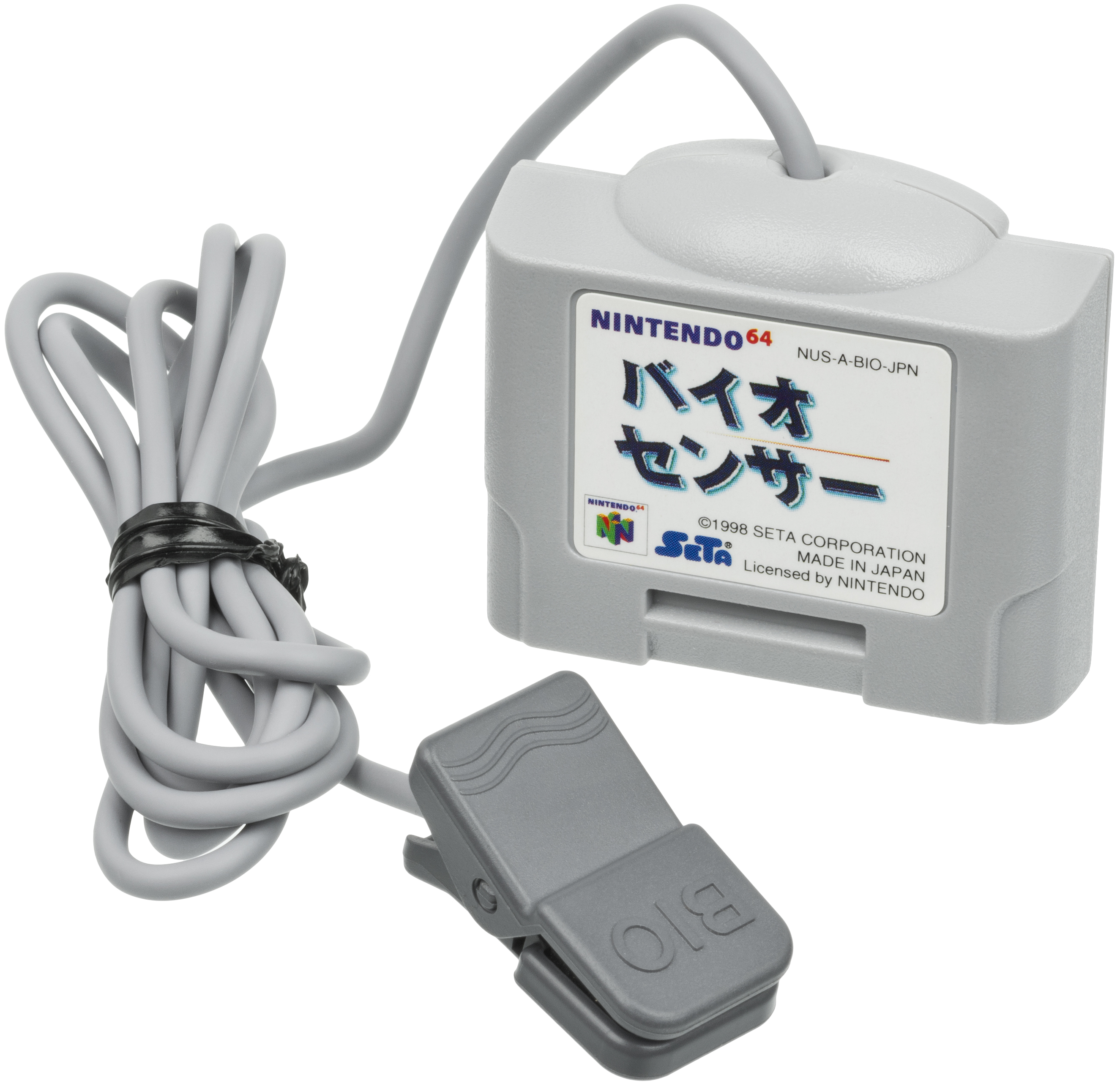
Bio Sensor

The Bio Sensor (Note: バイオセンサー, Baio Sensā) is an ear clip manufactured by SETA that plugs into the Controller Pak slot of the controller to measure the user's heart rate. It is compatible only with the Japanese-exclusive Tetris 64 (1998), which causes simpler or more complex shapes to drop depending on how fast the player's heart is beating. This device is similar to the unreleased Wii Vitality Sensor.

=== ASCIIWHEEL 64 ===
The ASCIIWHEEL 64, manufactured by ASCII Corporation in 1999, is an alternate controller shaped as a steering wheel for driving games, with an accessory port.

=== Densha de Go! 64 controller ===
Taito released a train controller that is compatible with just one game, Densha de Go! 64 (1999). It is similar to Densha de Go! controllers released on other platforms such as Dreamcast and PlayStation.

=== Hori Mini Pad 64 ===
The Hori Mini Pad 64 is an alternate controller manufactured by Hori. It features a smaller two-pronged form factor and a larger, more resilient analog stick.

=== Tsuricon 64 ===
The Tsuricon 64 (Note: つりコン64) is a fishing controller released by ASCII Corporation. It is compatible with a few Japanese fishing games, including Bass Rush: ECOGEAR PowerWorm Championship (2000), Nushi Tsuri 64: Shiokaze Ninotte (2000), and Itoi Shigesato no Bass Tsuri No. 1 Definitive Edition (2000).

=== Dance Dance Revolution dance pad ===
A Disney-branded dance pad was released by Konami for Dance Dance Revolution Disney Dancing Museum (2000).

=== System Organizer ===
Nintendo licensed A.L.S. Industries to make two types of black wooden system organizers. Both feature a plastic drawer, bearing a Nintendo 64 sticker, with slots designed to hold Nintendo 64 game cartridges, controllers, and Controller Paks.

=== Traveling accessories ===
The Messenger Bag is a black bag to be carried on the left side of the body. It comes with zippered compartments on the outside and inside and with mesh pockets, for a few games and a controller.

Nintendo licensed a Traveling Case—a black bag, with the Nintendo 64 name stitched on the front. Two plastic buckles on the front keep the bag closed. It carries the Nintendo 64 console, controllers, games, and accessories. A standard black backpack has the Nintendo 64 logo on the top and a zippered compartment on the front.

== Development and backup ==
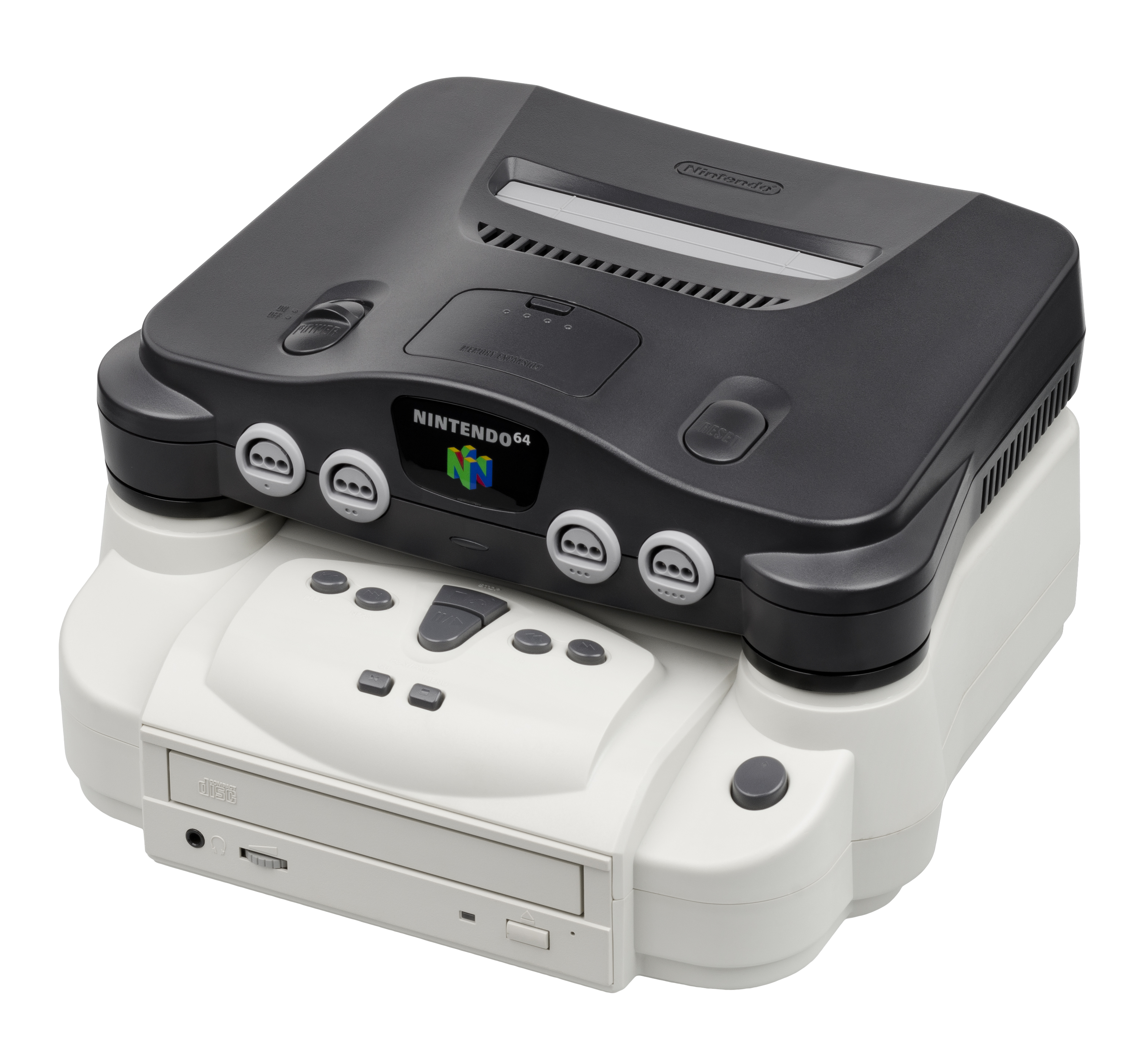
Doctor V64

The initial official development platform for the Nintendo 64 was developed and sold by SGI in the form of its Onyx supercomputer, priced at up to $250,000 (equivalent to $543,000 in 2025). Each system was equipped with a $50,000 (equivalent to $109,000 in 2025) RealityEngine2 graphics board and four 150 MHz R4400 CPUs. By July 1995, as the Nintendo 64's hardware neared finalization, the Onyx supercomputer was replaced with a more affordable development kit that consists of a console simulation board hosted on a low-end Indy workstation.

By 1999, the SGI systems were supplanted by the SN Maestro 64, a development kit built under license by SN Systems. This kit has a cartridge connecting a standard Nintendo 64 console to a PC via cable. Third-party development kits include the IS-VIEWER 64, Partner-N64 and the Monegi Smart Pack which enabled real-time development on the console. The Doctor V64 by Bung Enterprises loads games from CD, and the more affordable Doctor V64 Jr. connects to the PC through a parallel port. Bung produced the DX 256 Super Game Saver and the DS1 Super Doctor Save Card. Similar devices include the CD 64 (a CD-ROM drive by UFO/Success Company) and the Mr. Backup Z64, a ZIP drive for backups and cartridge playback. DexDrive connects a Nintendo 64 Controller Pak to a PC for save game sharing. Modern alternatives like the Everdrive 64 and SummerCart64 use SD cards or USB for ROM storage and file transfer.

== Wide-Boy64 ==
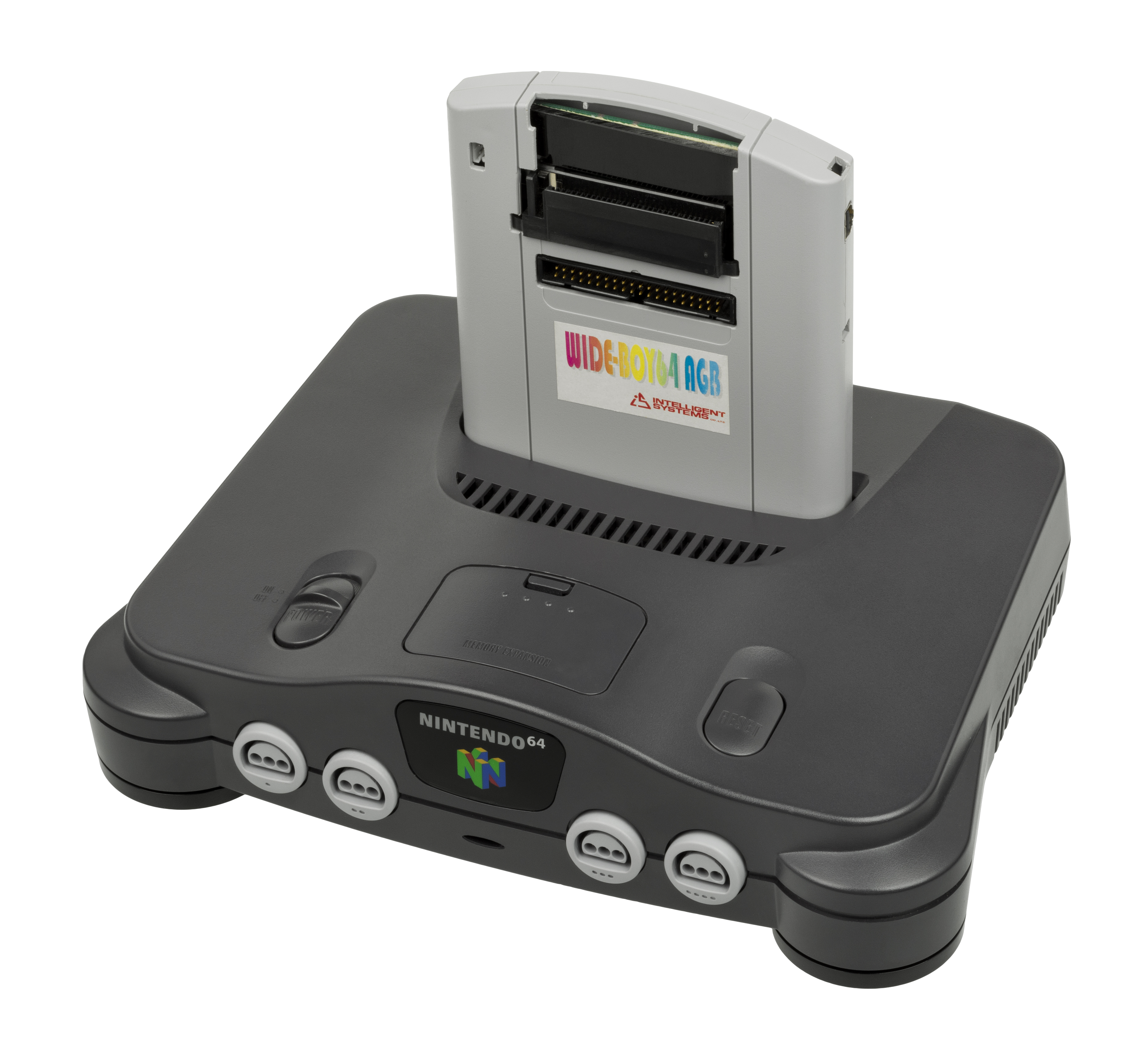
The Wide-Boy64 AGB is the last version of the Wide-Boy64 that can play Game Boy Advance games.

The Wide-Boy64 is a series of adapters, similar to the Super Game Boy, that allow Game Boy games to be played on a Nintendo 64. It is the successor to the Wide-Boy, a similar Famicom accessory. Like the Wide-Boy, the Wide-Boy64 was never sold at retail to general consumers but was exclusively available to developers and gaming press outlets, who could purchase it directly from Nintendo for $1,400 (equivalent to about $2,700 in 2025).

The Wide-Boy64 was developed by Intelligent Systems, a longtime Nintendo partner known for creating Game Boy software development kits. It is primarily used for capturing screenshots and video clips more efficiently, and displays the game screen with a border resembling the portable system.

Internally, the Wide-Boy64 contains Game Boy hardware, to run games natively rather than through emulation. Two major versions were released: the CGB model, which supports Game Boy and Game Boy Color games, and the updated AGB model, which added support for Game Boy Advance Game Paks.

== Unlicensed ==
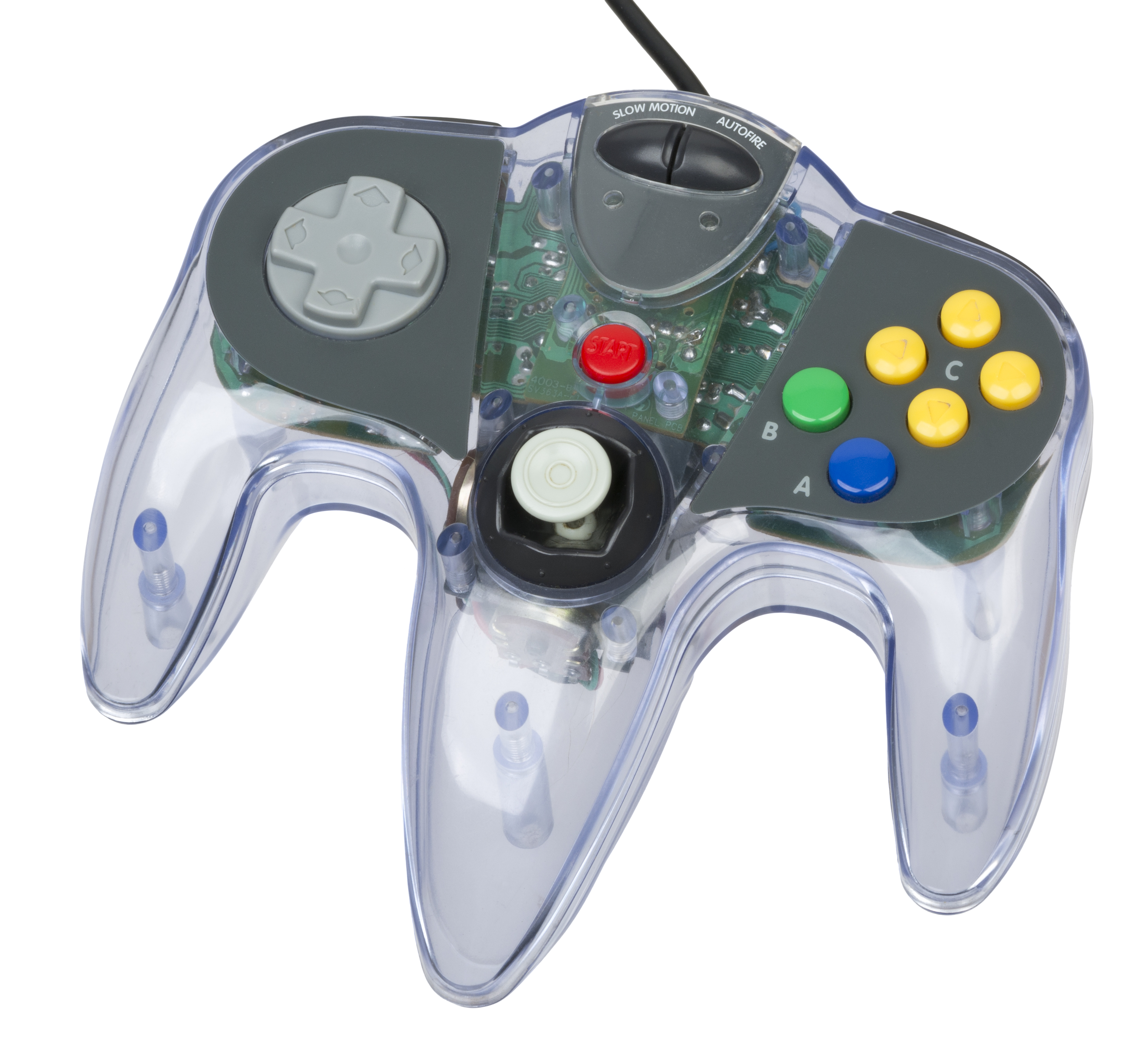
The SharkPad Pro

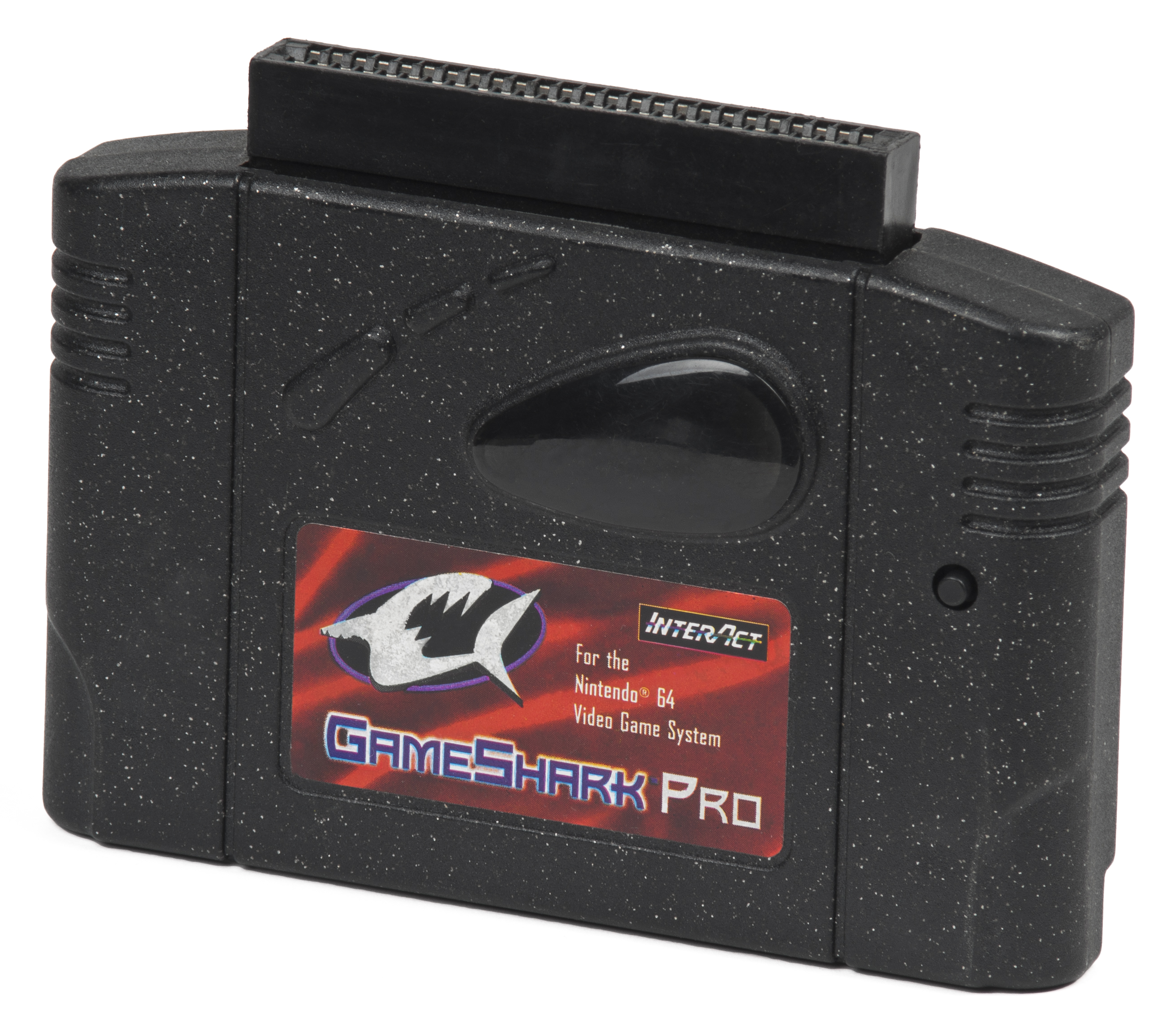
The GameShark Pro

The SharkPad Pro is a third-party controller from InterAct, with slow motion and autofire capabilities.

The Arcade Shark is an arcade-style joystick controller from InterAct with slow motion and autofire buttons.

The Flight Force Pro 64 is a flight stick from InterAct.

The GameShark, or Action Replay in Europe, is an unlicensed cheat device similar to the Game Genie, made by InterAct and Datel in two versions. The first version has an LED display and a slot on the back of the unit for an expansion card that was never made. The second version (known as the "Pro" series, versions 3.2 and up) has a parallel port on the back for connecting to a computer for game downloads.

The Memory Card is a series of third-party Controller Pak alternatives by InterAct, distributed by Datel in Europe. Later revisions, such the Memory Card Plus and Mega Memory Card, feature more memory than a standard Controller Pak.

The TremorPak is a third-party rumble expansion by InterAct, which can toggle between two levels of vibration strength. A second version, the TremorPak Plus, added an expansion port for an included InterAct Memory Card to be plugged in, with a switch to toggle between the two accessories' functionality.

The Advanced Control Pad is a Mad Catz gamepad with the same form and controls as the standard Nintendo 64 controller, plus a turbo button.

The Mad Catz Steering Wheel is a set consisting of an analog steering wheel that turns 270 degrees, two foot pedals, and a stick shift.

The Power Wheel is a steering wheel with a foot pedal module, produced by Game Source.

The Joycard 64 is a controller released by Hudson Soft with built in turbo controls, allowing players to trigger rapid inputs just by holding a button. Hudson hid secret features in games like Bomberman 64 (1997) and Bomberman Hero (1998) that could only be accessed using this rapid-press function.

The UltraRacer 64 is a vertically-oriented controller designed by InterAct for racing games. It features a radial dial in place of the analog stick and a trigger that functions as both the A and B buttons.

The GameBooster, or GB Hunter in the United States, is a Game Boy player developed by Datel, similar to the first-party Super Game Boy for the SNES. It has a built in cheat device and allows players to adjust screen size, color, and borders. However, not all games are compatible and it cannot reproduce the games' sound, instead playing a single looping music track.

The V3 Racing Wheel is a steering wheel with foot pedals produced by InterAct. It has vibration and includes an expansion port for an InterAct Memory Card. It does not support the Rumble Pak due to its redundancy and the risk that it would grate on the player's crotch.

The Glove, made by Reality Quest, is a wearable glove-like controller similar to the Power Glove with buttons like a normal controller. It is usable in any game.

The Nyko Hyper Pak Plus contains internal memory and a rumble feature.

The N64 Passport is an adaptor and cheat device by E.M.S. that bypasses games' region lock, with a few exceptions.

The Act Labs RS is a racing wheel that includes a pedal attachment. It is cross-compatible with Sega Saturn, PlayStation, and PC through the use of conversion cartridges that were sold separately.

The Tilt Pak is a rumble feedback and motion sensor made by Pelican.

The High-Rez Pack is Mad Catz's less expensive version of the Expansion Pak. There were reports of overheating due to inadequate cooling/venting, and the unit suffered from poor build quality.

SharkWire Online is a GameShark with modem and PC-style serial port for keyboards. It allowed emailing and Game Shark updates through the now discontinued sharkwire.com dial-in service.

The Tristar 64 is a third-party adaptor by Future Laboratory enabling NES and SNES games on Nintendo 64. The device expands the cartridge slot into three total slots for each cartridge type.

The Forever Pak 64 is a memory card developed by 4Layer Technologies. It has 256 kilobits of storage, but unlike the Controller Pak, it uses non-volatile memory to hold data indefinitely.

== Unreleased ==
InterAct reportedly had two Nintendo 64 light guns "packed and ready to ship" in 1997, one of them with built-in force feedback, but never released them due to the complete lack of light gun shooters for the console.

The 64 GB Cable (Note: 64GBケーブル, Rokujūyon Jī Bī Kēburu) was designed by Marigul Management to connect the 64DD to a Game Boy Color, allowing data to be transferred between the two as well as using the GBC as a second screen, similar to the GameCube – Game Boy Advance link cable. It was demonstrated at Space World 1999, but was never released, presumably due to the failure of the 64DD. Another unreleased accessory from Marigul, the GB Socket, was designed to interface with the 64 GB Cable and allow Game Boy Color games to similarly connect to games on the Sega Dreamcast.
