= Code Breaker =

Video game cheat device

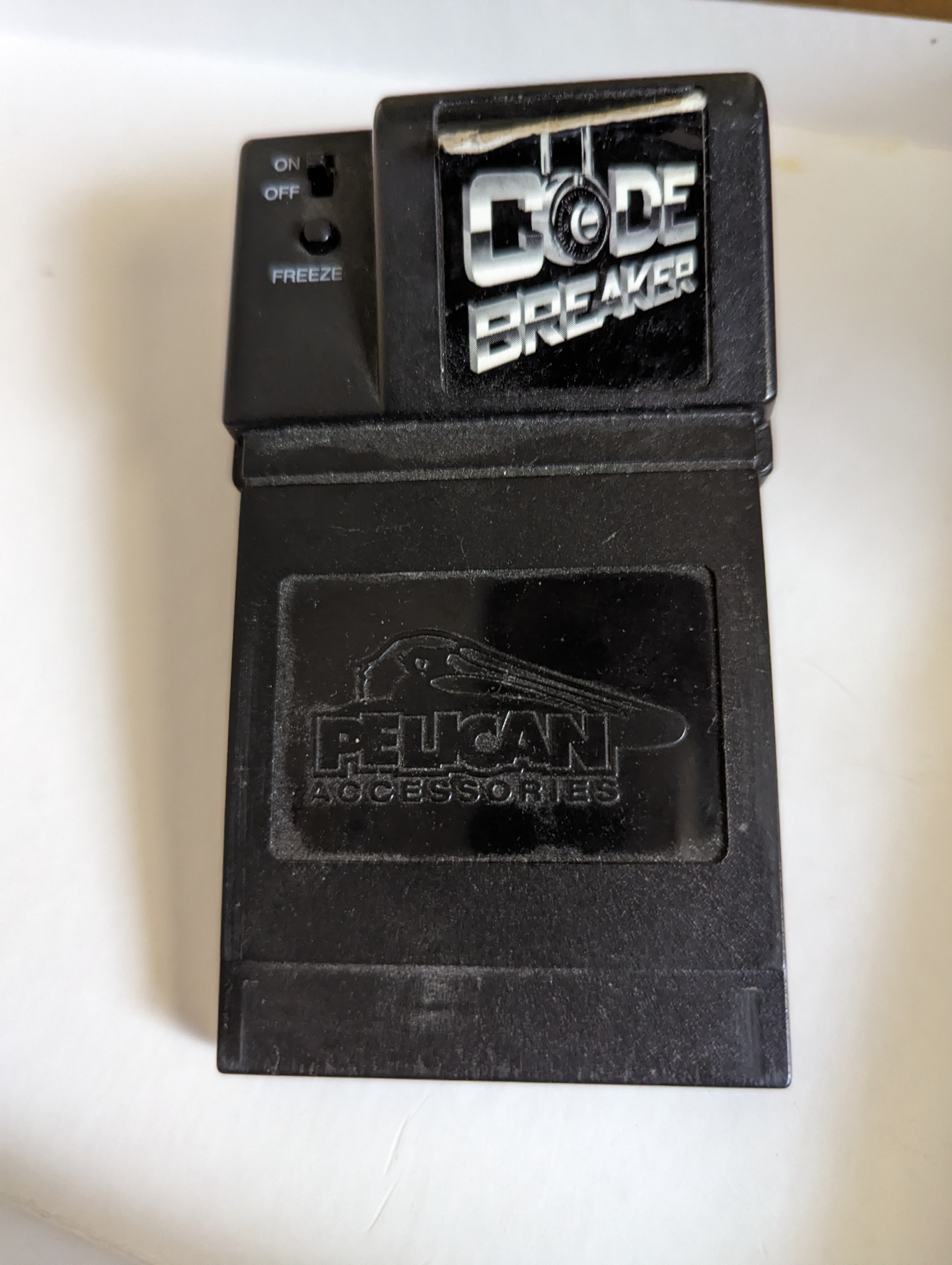
Code Breaker for Game Boy Color takes a game cartridge and includes a battery-powered rumble.

Code Breaker was a cheat device developed by Pelican Accessories, available for PlayStation, PlayStation 2, Dreamcast, Game Boy Color, Game Boy Advance, and Nintendo DS. Along with competing product Action Replay, it is one of the few currently supported video game cheat devices.

== History ==
Originally developed by the Fire International Group and distributed by Pelican Accessories as the NTSC/UC (North American) counterpart to the PAL (European) Xploder cheat device, the CodeBreaker first appeared on the Dreamcast relatively late in the console's lifecycle. Soon after the Dreamcast version was released, development began on a PlayStation 2 version.

After version six hit the market, Fire International abruptly broke off their partnership with Pelican to develop the newly Mad Catz-acquired GameShark. It was also at this time that the Game Boy Advance Code Breaker was discontinued. Pelican Accessories put together an internal development team and proceeded with future versions of CodeBreaker. Their original site was www.codebreaker.com, but Codetwink bought it and had a new site. Day1 is a feature that allows you to get codes from online and import them into Codebreaker with a USB Flash drive, and the codes were removed, but CodeTwink brought them back a while after.

== Features ==
Though previous versions of the PlayStation 2 Code Breaker were plagued by limited functionality, later versions were lauded for features such as a simple, uncluttered menu and "typing" systems. Version 9 added support for USB keyboards.

Unlike other cheat devices which store cheat codes on proprietary storage devices, the PlayStation 2 Code Breaker stored codes on memory cards, thus cutting down on manufacturing costs. Saves could also be copied from USB flash drives. The device's official web site, Codetwink, ran by CodeMasterX, (who also coded the entire cheat engine and cheat code types in the product) provides codes posted by the former Game Shark Code Creators Club. Codes can be downloaded from the official web site using the device's "Day1" feature. Later versions include support for the PlayStation 2's Broadband Adapter and internet chat.

== Current events ==
Using the Code Breaker device, one could access a feature named Day1 and import/export Saves. In some cases, one could avoid typing number by number using cheats import. However, Pelican Accessories no longer supports this. Since the last version of Codebreaker, Codebreaker 10.1, has www.codebreaker.com set as the Codebreaker site, the device can no longer connect to the Internet with it to get codes, nor use Codebreaker chat because of this site change, and because Code Breaker has been discontinued.

As of May 2012, www.codetwink.com uses a vBulletin type site format, but still had the Codebreaker Day1 files available for download to people who register for an account. As of June 2013, the Day1 files were unavailable. The codetwink.com server was moved and the hard drive was damaged. As of April 2017, a mirror of the old Codetwink site was hosted by Wes Castro, developer of the Cheat Device project. CodeMasterX had also returned to hosting and maintaining a modern Codetwink site that also sells the "Game Genie" game save editor for PlayStation 3 consoles.
