= ProDG =

ProDG can refer to:

- ProDG (Belgium), a political party active in the German-speaking community of Belgium
- ProDG (software), a suite of development tools produced by SN Systems
