= SharkWire Online =

Internet service for Nintendo 64 consoles

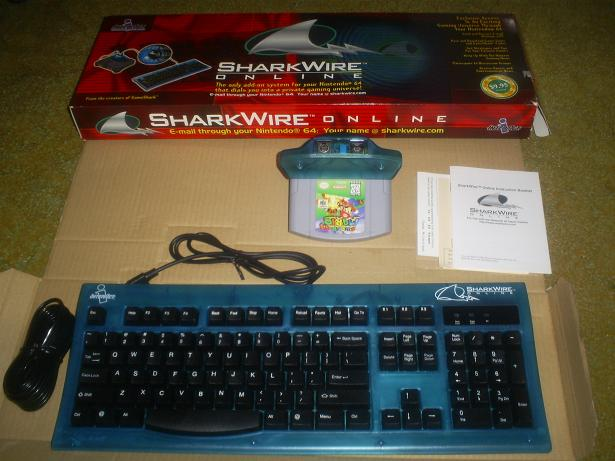
- SharkWire Online kit, showing the included keyboard and modem with Super Mario 64 Game Pak inserted to override the anti-piracy system
- Developer: InterAct · Spyglass, Inc.
- Type: Video game cheating, dial-up web browser
- Generation: Fifth
- Released: US: January 1, 2000
- Discontinued: US: 2003
- Media: Nintendo 64 Game Pak
- Input: Keyboard
- Connectivity: 14.4 kbps dialup modem
- Platform: Nintendo 64
- Related: 64DD · Morita Shogi 64
- Website: Archived March 4, 2000, at the Wayback Machine

SharkWire Online is a specialized GameShark device for Nintendo 64 with a serial port and modem added, accompanied by a now-defunct dialup Internet portal service. Launched in January 2000, it was sold only in the US. It was made by InterAct which is most famous for its GameShark and Dexdrive. This unlicensed platform was the only Nintendo 64 online service to have been released other than Nintendo's official Randnet service which had already been released only in Japan in December 1999.

== History ==
The SharkWire Online's Nintendo 64 accessories were developed by Datel in the UK, for InterAct to sell in the US. The now-defunct dialup portal system was developed between InterAct and its communications partners: Spyglass, Inc. for its Mosaic web browser application; D3 Networks, an Internet service provider (ISP) for game devices, which built and operated the SharkWire Online dialup network and content portal; and GTE Internetworking for its local dial-up access via its DiaLinx network and Global Network Infrastructure (GNI) backbone.

The SharkWire Online was presented to the public at the Electronic Entertainment Expo (E3) in Los Angeles on May 13–15, 1999. A PlayStation version was preannounced but canceled in development. Later in 1999, it was test marketed in Atlanta, Georgia, Dallas, Texas, Minneapolis, Minnesota, but not released to the rest of the US until January 1, 2000. The company considered the possibility of eventually supporting online multiplayer gaming, and opening up access to the wider Internet beyond their proprietary portal.

The company ran a $5–10 million advertising campaign created by advertising agency J. Walter Thompson across TV, print, radio, direct, and interactive media. It portrayed an aggressive image of a teenager "hacking" versus the FBI, which "gives kids a feeling of control and power over the establishment".

In 2003, SharkWire Online and all other trademarks of GameShark were sold to Mad Catz, and InterAct ceased operations.

== Usage ==
The SharkWire Online product is based on a Nintendo 64 cartridge, which contains a modem and the Mosaic web browser licensed by Spyglass, Inc. The product's operation requires Nintendo's Expansion Pak for RAM. Because the SharkWire Online cartridge is unlicensed by Nintendo, a security workaround is achieved when the user inserts a Nintendo 64 video game cartridge into the SharkWire's rear slot, with the label facing up. The keyboard and telephone cords are plugged directly into the SharkWire Online cartridge. To navigate the menus, Controller 1 must be attached to the Nintendo 64 console.

The accompanying dialup service was intended as a safely proxied and customized Internet access method for children aged 7 to 14 years. The service allowed the player to upload and download game save data via their Controller Pak, and to download cheat codes directly into the SharkWire cartridge. The portal contained copies of articles which had already been published on the Internet by InterAct's content partners. These partners included Fox Sports, Electronics Boutique, GamePro, Prima, Eidos, Capcom USA, Jones Soda, Airwalk, UPN, and Arnette Sunglasses.

However, due to the continual updating of Nintendo's security chips to lock out unlicensed products, even since the time of the product's release, it is incompatible with the following games:

- The Legend of Zelda: Ocarina of Time
- Yoshi's Story
- Major League Baseball Featuring Ken Griffey, Jr.
- Kobe Bryant in NBA Courtside
- F-Zero X
- Diddy Kong Racing
- Cruis'n World
- Banjo-Kazooie
- 1080° Snowboarding

To bypass these lockouts, would require the re-manufacturing of the SharkWire cartridge's hardware. While subsequent GameSharks were released for the N64, the SharkWire Online cartridge was not updated, and more Nintendo 64 games were produced that it is unable to unlock and play with.

== Reception ==
A review by Oklahoma City television station KOTV's news operation found the online portal content to be well-written and suitable more for young children, although very limited in content and scope and less suitable for more mature gamers. The review found the email functionality to be good once the faulty keyboard was replaced, and also well suited for children.

== See also ==
- 64DD
