= Hybrid Heaven =

1999 video game

- European box art
- Developer: Konami Computer Entertainment Osaka
- Publisher: Konami
- Director: Yasuo Daikai
- Producer: Kazuhiko Uehara
- Designers: Yasuo Daikai; Tatsuya Shinkai; Tetsuya Matsui; Keiji Matsukita
- Composers: Nobuyuki Akena; Yusuke Kato
- Platform: Nintendo 64
- Release: JP: August 5, 1999; NA: August 31, 1999; EU: September 24, 1999
- Genre: Action role-playing
- Modes: Single-player, multiplayer

Hybrid Heaven (Note: ハイブリッドヘヴン) is a 1999 action role playing game developed by Konami Computer Entertainment Osaka and published by Konami for Nintendo 64. This game is most notable for its peculiar mix of genres: it has aspects of both role-playing video games and action-adventure games. It is also one of the few Nintendo 64 titles to support a widescreen mode.

== Gameplay ==
Hybrid Heaven takes many elements from standard 3-D action-adventure games, such as Tomb Raider. The player can move in any direction, jump, crawl, climb, and shoot. The player must solve puzzles by disabling electronic weapons or through skillful maneuvering.

However, when battling a monster (called a "biological weapon" in Hybrid Heaven), the game switches to a completely different mode. The player is constrained to a small room and can no longer jump, crawl, or climb. The monster and the player move around for strategic position in the room. When they are close enough, and have built up sufficient energy, one or the other will decide to attack. At that point, time freezes and a single round similar to a role-playing video game ensues. The attacker picks an attack from a list, the defender picks a defense, and the results are displayed. After the attack, the monster and the player return to fighting for position in real-time.

The Vs. Battle Mode plays like a regular 3D fighting game, but with some unique RPG elements. In addition to regular punching, kicking, and grappling attacks, energy can be saved up to five times to allow for combos, achieved by either the player editing their own during a fight (one move at a time), or by choosing preset or saved combos. The battle system of Hybrid Heaven has a strong emphasis on leveling up. Experience using an offense or a defense directly correlates with the player's statistical abilities when performing that move in the future, with separate statistics for each limb, the torso, and the head. A body part can become injured, which makes it harder to battle a monster.

The game includes Rumble Pak and Expansion Pak support.

== Plot ==
The player assumes the role of Mr. Diaz, a synthetic human hybrid created by aliens. In the introduction, he turns on his masters when he kills a synthetic human intended to replace the President's bodyguard, Johnny Slater. Diaz finds himself in a massive underground installation created by the aliens beneath Manhattan. As the game progresses, it is revealed that the player is actually assuming the role of Slater, who was disguised as Diaz by the Gargatuans. The Gargatuans are an alien race around three feet tall who, after being betrayed by a member of their species that awoke from hypersleep and piloted the ship to Earth, are forced to help the traitor with his genetic experiments. The alien creates clones and hybrids (a genetic mix of human and Gargatuan DNA, resulting in extra-powerful creatures) and intends to conquer the earth through a replacement of its leaders, beginning with the United States. A few Gargatuans have escaped the traitor, and secretly conduct an underground resistance. They found Johnny after he had been cloned and disguised him as Diaz, who they incapacitated and kept unconscious. Johnny regains his memories, which were blocked while he was disguised. The player then must travel even further down the bunker in the hopes of stopping the aliens from replacing the president with a clone and by request of the Gargatuans to defeat the traitor. Johnny's personal motive to help him stay focused is that he must make it back in time to meet his girlfriend under the Christmas tree on the White House lawn.

Enemies included clones (unremarkable creations, created mainly for menial labor), agents (resemble the public perception of the secret service, men in black suits with sunglasses), mutants (genetic experiments that resulted in vicious creatures, presumably for military), robots (mostly humanoid, but some were mechs), and hybrids. One hybrid, created to replace the Secretary of Defense (or possibly State), is Johnny's antagonist for much of the game, before a final showdown wherein the alien creature explains most of the plot.

== Development ==
Hybrid Heaven took roughly three years to develop, with the battle system being the most time-consuming element. Konami Computer Entertainment Osaka designed Hybrid Heaven as an answer to Konami Computer Entertainment Japan's Metal Gear Solid, an attempt to better their fellow Konami team's top tier title in development. Elements of the game were inspired by the film Blade Runner.

The team wanted the battle system to capture real fighting's combination of thought and action.

== Reception ==
Reception

Review scores
Publication	Score
AllGame	3.5/5
Electronic Gaming Monthly	7/10, 7.5/10, 7.5/10, 8/10
Famitsu	30/40
GameSpot	4.1/10
IGN	7/10
N64 Magazine	83%
Next Generation	3/5
The Sydney Morning Herald	2/5

As games of this genre were rarely seen on the Nintendo 64, the game carried a certain amount of hype to it. For instance, N64 Magazine gave Hybrid Heaven many multipage previews and devoted two covers to it. The game was met with mixed reviews ranging from decent scores, such as the 7/10 it received from IGN, to low scores such as the 4.1 it received from GameSpot.

Next Generation stated that, "Had Konami thrown in some variety, such as a city scene, the game could have been so much more than just an interesting hybrid with great graphics and sound. As it is, it's certainly fun, but not quite excellent."
