= GameShark =

Brand of video game cheating devices

- Original authors: InterAct Accessories (United States), Datel (United Kingdom)
- Release: US: 1996
- Platform: N64, PSX, Saturn, DC, PS2, GCN, Xbox, GB/GBC, GBA, PSP
- Available in: English
- Type: Cheating device
- Website: GameShark.com

GameShark is a brand of video game cheat devices originally developed for home and handheld consoles. Introduced in the mid-1990s, it became one of the most popular cheat platforms in North America, offering gamers the ability to modify game behavior using codes that alter memory addresses.

== History ==
=== Origins and UK development ===
The GameShark brand originated in the United Kingdom, developed by Datel, a UK-based company specializing in video game peripherals and software modification tools. Datel had previously created the similar Action Replay device.

=== U.S. introduction and InterAct Accessories (1996–2003) ===
In 1996, InterAct Accessories, Inc., a U.S.-based gaming accessory company founded by Todd Hays, acquired the exclusive rights to distribute GameShark in North America and Trademarked the GameShark brand. InterAct rebranded Datel’s hardware for the U.S. market and began marketing GameShark products for platforms like the Sony PlayStation, Nintendo 64, and Game Boy.

InterAct operated as a subsidiary of Recoton Corporation, a large consumer electronics firm. Under InterAct, GameShark quickly became a dominant brand in the U.S. gaming accessory market and was widely sold in retail outlets such as Toys “R” Us, Walmart, and Electronics Boutique.

=== Recoton bankruptcy and Mad Catz acquisition (2003–2012) ===
In 2003, Recoton filed for bankruptcy, and InterAct's assets, including the GameShark brand, were acquired by Mad Catz, a U.S.-based manufacturer of gaming peripherals. Mad Catz continued to sell GameShark products across various platforms including the PlayStation 2, Xbox, and Game Boy Advance.

However, as game consoles implemented more secure hardware and software ecosystems, cheat devices like GameShark declined in popularity. GameShark-branded products were no longer sold in the U.S. after 2012, marking the end of the brand’s active commercial presence.

=== Dormancy and legacy (2012–present) ===
Though Mad Catz continued operations until filing for bankruptcy in 2017, the GameShark brand was already dormant. No new official GameShark products have been released since 2012. The device remains a nostalgic symbol of late 1990s and early 2000s gaming, especially among retro gaming enthusiasts and collectors.

== Products ==
When the original GameShark was released, it came with 4,000 preloaded codes. Codes could be entered, but unlike Game Genie, codes were saved in the onboard flash memory and could be accessed later rather than having to be reentered. The cartridges also acted as memory cards, with equal or greater storage capacity to the consoles' first-party memory cards. It was originally released for the Sega Saturn and Sony PlayStation consoles in January 1996. It was a runner-up for Electronic Gaming Monthly's Best Peripheral of 1996 (behind the Saturn analog controller). A GameShark was released for the Nintendo 64 in late August 1997. The Nintendo 64 GameShark also bypasses the console's regional lockout, allowing games from any region to be played on the same unit. A GameShark was released for the PlayStation 2 in 2002.

== See also ==
- Action Replay
- Code Breaker
- DexDrive
- Game Genie
- Multiface
- MaxDrive
- SharkWire Online
- Xploder
- Equalizer (Datel)
