= Action Replay =

Brand of video game cheating devices

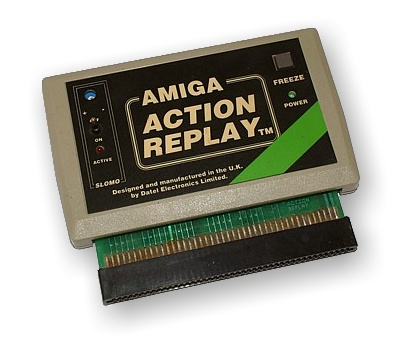
Action Replay cartridge for the Amiga 500

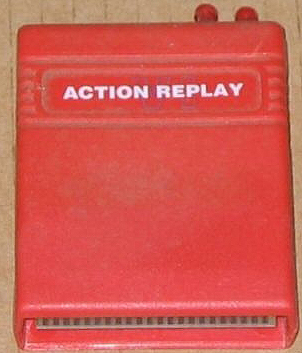
Action Replay cartridge for Commodore 64

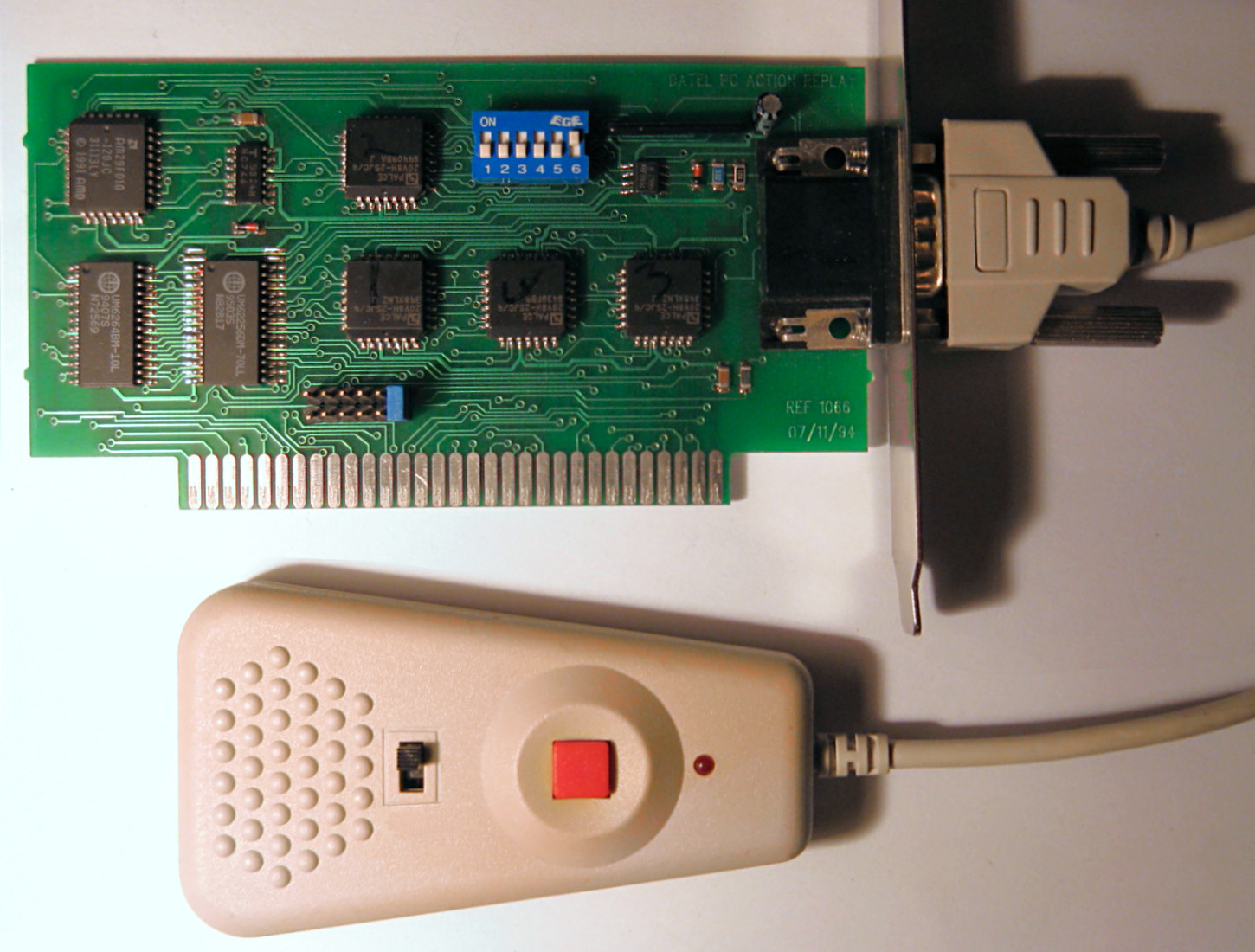
Action Replay ISA card for PC 1994

Action Replay is the brand name of a cheating device (such as cheat cartridges) created by Datel. The Action Replay is available for many computer and gaming systems including Commodore 64, Amiga, IBM PC, Nintendo DS, Nintendo DSi, Nintendo 3DS, PlayStation Portable, PlayStation 2, GameCube, Game Boy Advance, and the Xbox. The name is derived from the first devices' signature ability to pause the execution of the software and save the computer's state (the complete contents of the memory) to disk or tape for future "replay". The ability to manipulate the contents of memory in this paused state permitted the cheat functions for which the brand is now better known.

== Typical features ==
Typical cheating options include:

- Making the player character stronger, such as with infinite lives, invulnerability, permanent power-ups, no collision detection, walk through walls, one-hit kills, super-high jumps, infinite money, etc.
- Warping directly to specific levels.
- The ability to download, upload, import and export saved games from and to the Internet or a storage device.
- Allowing the player to save the game state to disk, so that the game can be restarted from that point even if it does not support saving.
- Region-free operation.
- Loading of third-party or homebrew applications/games.
- Display of internal game data which are not normally seen by the player.

== Action Replay DS and DSi ==
Also known as Action Replay for the Nintendo DS system, this device is a part of the main series created by Datel. The device usually comes with a cartridge, a software disc, and a cable to connect the device to a computer. Unlike future iterations, these versions communicate directly with the game's memory in real time. Because of this, the desired game needs to be inserted within the cartridge and then inserted into the system. Codes are created using the hexadecimal numbering system, and while Datel supplies a rich base of codes, users are given the ability to create their own codes.

== Power-Saves ==
Power-Saves by Action Replay are a related series of video-game cheat devices. Unlike the main Action Replay series, which cheats by modifying the game code itself, Power-Saves store the game saves created by Datel, allowing users to cheat without modifying the game code being executed. Power-Saves are available for game systems such as the Wii on an SD card and the Nintendo 3DS.

== Versions for computers ==
- Commodore 64
  - Action Replay
  - Action Replay MK II
  - Action Replay MK III
  - Action Replay MK IV (1988)
  - Action Replay MK V (1989)
  - Action Replay MK VI
- Amiga
  - Action Replay (A500 cart / A2000 CPU card)
  - Action Replay (A1200 card)
  - Action Replay MK II (A500 cart / A2000 CPU card)
  - Action Replay MK III (A500 cart / A2000 CPU card) (1991)
- IBM PC compatibles
  - Action Replay PC (ISA card) for MS-DOS (1994)
  - Action Replay PC for Windows 9x (1998)

The ISA-based Action Replay needs memory-resident drivers for both the real and protected mode. The card has a grabber, a trainer, and a slowdown feature. It can also interrupt the current game or save it to disk (freezer).

Models running firmware 4.0 and beyond use EEPROM instead of ROM and thus are upgradeable.

In December 1998, Datel released a version for Windows 95/98.

== Versions for video game consoles ==
=== Third generation ===
- Nintendo Entertainment System
  - Pro Action Replay
- Master System
  - Pro Action Replay

=== Fourth generation ===
- Mega Drive/Genesis
  - Action Replay
  - Pro Action Replay
  - Pro Action Replay MK2
  - Pro CDX (Action Replay) for the Mega-CD
- Super NES
  - Pro Action Replay
  - Pro Action Replay MK2
  - Pro Action Replay MK3

=== Fifth generation ===
- Saturn
  - Pro Action Replay
  - Pro Action Replay 4M (with 4 MB RAM)
  - Pro Action Replay 4M Plus (Same as the 4M, but with manual choice of the needed RAM)
- PlayStation
  - Action Replay (1995)
  - Pro Action Replay (1996)
  - Action Replay CDX (1997)
  - Action Replay 2 V2 (2001) [As Bonus Disc With PS2 Action Replay 2 V2]
  - Equalizer
  - Equalizer CDX
  - Equalizer Extreme
- Nintendo 64
  - Action Replay
  - Action Replay Professional (1999)
  - Equalizer (Datel)

=== Sixth generation ===
- Dreamcast
  - Action Replay CDX (2000)
  - Equalizer Extreme
- PlayStation 2
  - Action Replay 2 (2000)
  - Action Replay 2 V2 (2001)
  - Action Replay MAX (2003)
  - Action Replay MAX EVO (2004)
  - Action Replay MAX EVO (2009)
- Xbox
  - Action Replay MAX
  - Action Replay MAX 360 Power-saves (2009)
- GameCube
  - Action Replay (2003) [Note: The latest Wii firmware blocks this on Wii consoles running in GameCube mode.]
  - Action Replay MAX (2004)
  - Action Replay (2006, works on Wii)
  - Action Replay Power-saves (2007)

=== Seventh generation ===
- Wii
  - Wii Action Replay Power-saves (2010)
  - Action Replay Wii (2012)

== Versions for hand-held consoles ==
- Game Gear
  - Pro Action Replay
- Game Boy, Game Boy Pocket, Game Boy Color
  - Pro Action Replay
  - Action Replay Professional (1997)
  - Action Replay Pro (1999)
  - Action Replay Online (2000)
  - Action Replay Extreme (2001)
- Game Boy Advance, Game Boy Advance SP, Game Boy Micro
  - Action Replay GBX (November 2001)
  - Action Replay (2003)
  - Action Replay MAX (2004)
  - Action Replay MAX DUO (March 2005)
  - Action Replay Ultimate Codes for use with Pokemon (2006)
- Nintendo DS, Nintendo DS Lite
  - Action Replay MAX DUO (March 2005)
  - Action Replay DS (July 2006) [last firmware v1.71, games released later are not compatible]
    - NDS Trainer Toolkit (February 2007) [available only online]
  - Action Replay DS Media Edition (September 2008) [available only online]
  - Action Replay DS EZ (February 2009)
- Nintendo DSi, Nintendo DSi XL
  - Action Replay DSi (October 2009); Later system software updates to the DSi and 3DS include a 'white list' which prevents unlicensed games from booting, this stops older Action Replays from loading on updated DSi and 3DS handhelds, however older Action Replays will continue to work on original DS and DS Lite handhelds.
  - Action Replay DS "3DS/DSi/DS/Lite Compatible" (September 2011)
- Nintendo 3DS, Nintendo 3DS XL
  - Action Replay Power Saves for 3DS (June 2013). The Action Replay Power Saves for 3DS can alter saves of 3DS games and has some codes for 3DS games.
- PlayStation Portable
  - Action Replay MAX including 64 MB Memory Stick (August 2005) [Power-saves only]
  - Action Replay for PSP including 64 MB or 1 GB Memory Stick [Power-saves only]
  - Action Replay PSP including 1 GB Memory Stick (October 2008)
  - Action Replay PSP Online (December 2009)

== See also ==
- Game Shark
- Game Genie
- Multiface
- Code Breaker
- Xploder
