= SN Systems =

British software company

SN Systems Limited
- Type: Subsidiary
- Industry: Software development Video games
- Founded: 1990; 36 years ago
- Founder: Andy Beveridge; Martin Day
- Defunct: April 1, 2025; 18 months ago
- Fate: Integrated into Sony Interactive Entertainment
- Headquarters: Bristol, England, United Kingdom
- Key people: Andy Beveridge (director); Martin Day (research director)
- Products: ProDG; SNC Compiler; SN-DBS (Distributed Build Server)
- Parent: Sony Interactive Entertainment (2005–2025)
- Website: snsystems.com at the Wayback Machine (archived 2025-02-24)

SN Systems was a provider of Windows based development tools for games consoles and virtual reality headsets, including the PlayStation VR2, PlayStation 5, PlayStation VR, PlayStation 4, PlayStation 3, PlayStation 2, PlayStation, PlayStation Vita, and PSP.

The company had provided tools for the Atari ST, Amiga, Sega Saturn, Sega Genesis/Mega Drive, Super NES, Nintendo 64, GameCube, Game Boy Advance, and Nintendo DS.

== History ==
The company was founded in 1990 by Martin Day and Andy Beveridge. Both directors have backgrounds of developing game console software development tools, such as SNASM and Psy-Q, at Cross Products and later Psygnosis.

SN Systems' long association with the PlayStation line of consoles began in 1993, when PlayStation manufacturer Sony acquired Psygnosis, who were publishing SN Systems' tools at the time. While Sony had provided MIPS R4000-based Sony NEWS workstations for PlayStation development, Psygnosis disliked the thought of developing on these expensive workstations and asked SN Systems to create a PC-based development system. At the 1994 Winter Consumer Electronics Show, Psygnosis arranged an audience for SN Systems with Sony's Japanese executives, and Sony were impressed enough with their development tools that they decided to abandon their plans for a workstation-based development system in favor of using SN Systems' development system exclusively.

In 1999, SN Systems won a Game Developer Magazine "Front Line Award" in the Programming Environment category for its Nintendo 64 development product called SN64. The company won again in 2005, this time for the ProDG for PSP suite.

SN Systems was acquired by Sony Computer Entertainment in 2005, to provide tools for the PlayStation 3, and future consoles.

Based in Bristol, England, the company had satellite offices in San Mateo, California and Dublin, Ireland.

On 5 February 2025, it was announced that SN Systems was to be fully integrated into Sony Interactive Entertainment on 1 April 2025.

== Products ==
Central to the SN Systems product line was the ProDG suite, comprising a compiler and integration with Microsoft Visual Studio, together with a debugger and additional build tools.
