= ProDG (software) =

Suite of development tools

ProDG (pronounced “prodigy”) by SN Systems is a suite of development tools produced for PlayStation 3, PlayStation 2, PSP, Nintendo DS, GameCube, and Game Boy Advance.

The phrase PRO-DG was originally registered as a UK trademark, but the hyphen was never used for a released version and the suite has subsequently been known as ProDG.

The suite consisted of console hardware-specific assemblers, a C/C++ compiler, ELF/DLL linkers, and a source-level debugger. The build tools could be controlled either from the command line or integrated with Microsoft Visual Studio.

The artist preview software tool, ProView, and Tuner, a profiler and performance optimizer, were also included in some versions of ProDG.

== Components ==
=== Compiler ===
From 2004 the suite included the SN Systems Compiler, SNC, tailored for specific hardware requirements, rather than a derivative of the compiler provided by the console manufacturer, frequently a variant of the GNU Compiler Collection. The SNC compiler was designed to improve code generation, reduce the size of debug data, provide console specific intrinsic functions and provide greater control in respect of program layout.

=== Linker ===
The linker allowed flexibility for object code management and the creation of dynamic linked libraries and overlays. It also identified and removed unused code and data.

=== Assemblers ===
Assemblers with additional, hardware specific instructions were provided for all processors.

=== Debugger ===
The debugger was designed for the specific target console. Windows are customizable and colour-coded and debug information was organized logically by processor. Multiple target views including CPU registers, memory, disassembly, source, local variables and watch points were supported. Also included was the colour-coded display of printf streams with optional auto-wrapping and configurable scrollback buffer sizes, as well as a templated registers pane supporting user-defined layouts.

=== Visual Studio Integration ===
All toolchain command-line switches could be added to the Project / Settings dialog in Visual Studio. Projects could be generated using custom App wizards, code could be edited, compiled and built in Visual Studio.

Visual Studio Integration provided a edit/build/debug cycle including, access to all Visual Studio features for the project, such as build dependencies, browse information, and Intellisense features when editing C and C++ source.

=== Target Manager ===
Managed connections to multiple development hardware kits on a network, allowing simultaneous debug sessions and sharing between teams of developers. Target Manager API provided target control for writing plug-ins and custom tools

== Versions ==
=== ProDG for Nintendo 64 ===
The ProDG development tools for Nintendo 64 nicknamed "SN64" were initially released in 1997.

=== ProDG for PlayStation 2 ===
The ProDG development tools were initially released for PlayStation 2 in 2000.

=== ProDG Plus for PlayStation 2 ===
ProDG Plus provided additional game development tools and debugging features which were not available in the standard ProDG for PlayStation®2.

These included:

- ProView – an artist and testing preview tool which used an IEEE 1394 connection.
- A built-in debugger scripting language. This made it possible to customize the debugger type displays, add new debugger windows and extend debugger menus. The script window also provided an immediate-mode command-line capability from which custom debug functions could be called.
- Tuner - a performance tuning tool.

In 2004 SNC for PlayStation 2 was released.

=== ProDG for Nintendo GameCube and ProDG for Game Boy Advance ===
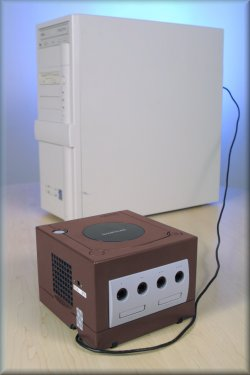
SN-TDEV connected to the developer-only brown GameCube

ProDG for Nintendo GameCube and ProDG for Game Boy Advance were released in 2001.

In 2002, DevLink and SN-TDEV for Nintendo GameCube were released. Devlink was a high speed communication tool for game developers using ProDG for Nintendo GameCube, which helped programmers debug their code on the NR-Reader. It could also be used by artists and level designers to download artwork or scene data from a PC to the NR-Reader. SN-TDEV was used with ProDG for Nintendo GameCube to build, debug, view and optimise games. The ProDG for GameCube is the only device which makes use of the second serial port featured on earlier GameCube hardware releases.

=== ProDG Plus for Nintendo GameCube ===
ProDG Plus for Nintendo GameCube was released on 24 February 2003. It included Tuner and additional debugger scripting features, which were not available in the standard ProDG suite. Based on an image from the PRO-DG website, this was the only product to ever utilize Serial port 2 on Nintendo GameCube.

=== ProDG for PSP ===
ProDG for PSP® was released in 2004, using SNC technology licensed from Apogee. It included the v2.0 debugger, SNC C/C++ Compiler and Tuner as standard.

The majority of North American launch titles for Sony Computer Entertainment's PSP® (PlayStation®Portable) were developed using the ProDG suite of tools. From a line-up of 24 game titles listed in the North American launch window for PSP, 20 were developed using SN Systems' ProDG for PSP® development tools.

In 2005, SN Systems won a Game Developer Magazine "Front Line Award" in the Programming Environment category for the ProDG for PSP suite.

In 2005, the ProView for PSP artist and testing preview tool was released, with USB and Wi-Fi connectivity.

=== ProDG for Nintendo DS ===
In conjunction with the Japanese software and hardware producer Hudson, SN Systems produced an official hardware development kit for the Nintendo DS and ProDG for Nintendo DS was released in 2005.

=== ProDG for PlayStation 3 ===
In 2005 Sony Computer Entertainment (SCEI) acquired SN Systems, the world leader in development tools for videogames platforms. Following this acquisition, the ProDG suite was central to Sony's plans to improve the development environment and tools for PlayStation 3.

ProDG for PlayStation 3 was released in 2006.

=== ProDG for PlayStation Vita ===
ProDG for Sony PlayStation Vita was released in 2011. The tools were integrated with Microsoft Visual Studio and Windows Explorer and included Razor Performance Analyzer.
