= DexDrive =

Personal computer peripheral

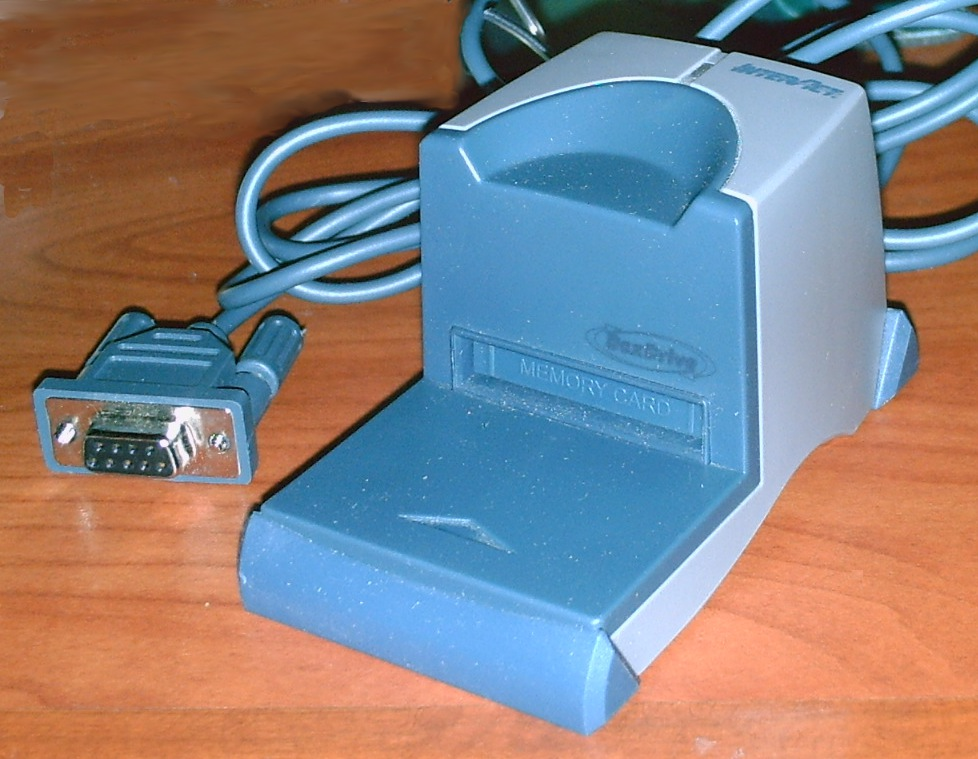
- DexDrive for PlayStation
- Date invented: 1996; 29 years ago
- Invented by: InterAct
- Connects to: Motherboard via: serial port; I/O card via: serial port

DexDrive is a discontinued line of home video game console memory card readers released in 1998, allowing saved game data transfer to a personal computer. It was made by now-defunct InterAct for use with PlayStation and Nintendo 64 memory cards. The company hosted a curated website to facilitate online sharing of saved game data.

== Overview ==
DexPlorer 1.0

The DexDrive is a personal computer peripheral to exchange saved game data from the memory cards of video game consoles. The two DexDrive models are for either PlayStation or Nintendo 64 memory cards, and each model retailed in 1998 for US$39.95 (equivalent to about $80 in 2024). That was about the cost of two memory cards, each with capacity far less than a floppy disk, so a PC's hard drive is much more cost effective for mass storage. As PC files, game data can be shared over the Internet or be used with console emulators.

The DexDrive connects to the PC via serial port and the DexPlorer driver application for Windows. Interact developed a way to use the Game Shark to share save data for Nintendo 64 games that use cartridge-based storage instead of memory cards. A USB version was reportedly in development.

== Reception ==
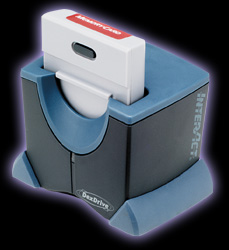
DexDrive for Nintendo 64

Core Magazine said the serial port is slow but hardware and software installation is simple. DexChange.net was curated by Interact employees who supply files for games that users have not, and new games were covered quickly, yielding "more saves available that you could ever want". The magazine summarized: "All in all, the DexDrive is a splendid idea, and worth its $39.95 retail price (which is, as Interact points out, the cost of a typical multi-page memory card). The DexDrive may wind up being one of the most novel gaming peripherals since the Analog controller."

== See also ==
- MaxDrive
