= Xploder =

Brand of cheat codes for game consoles

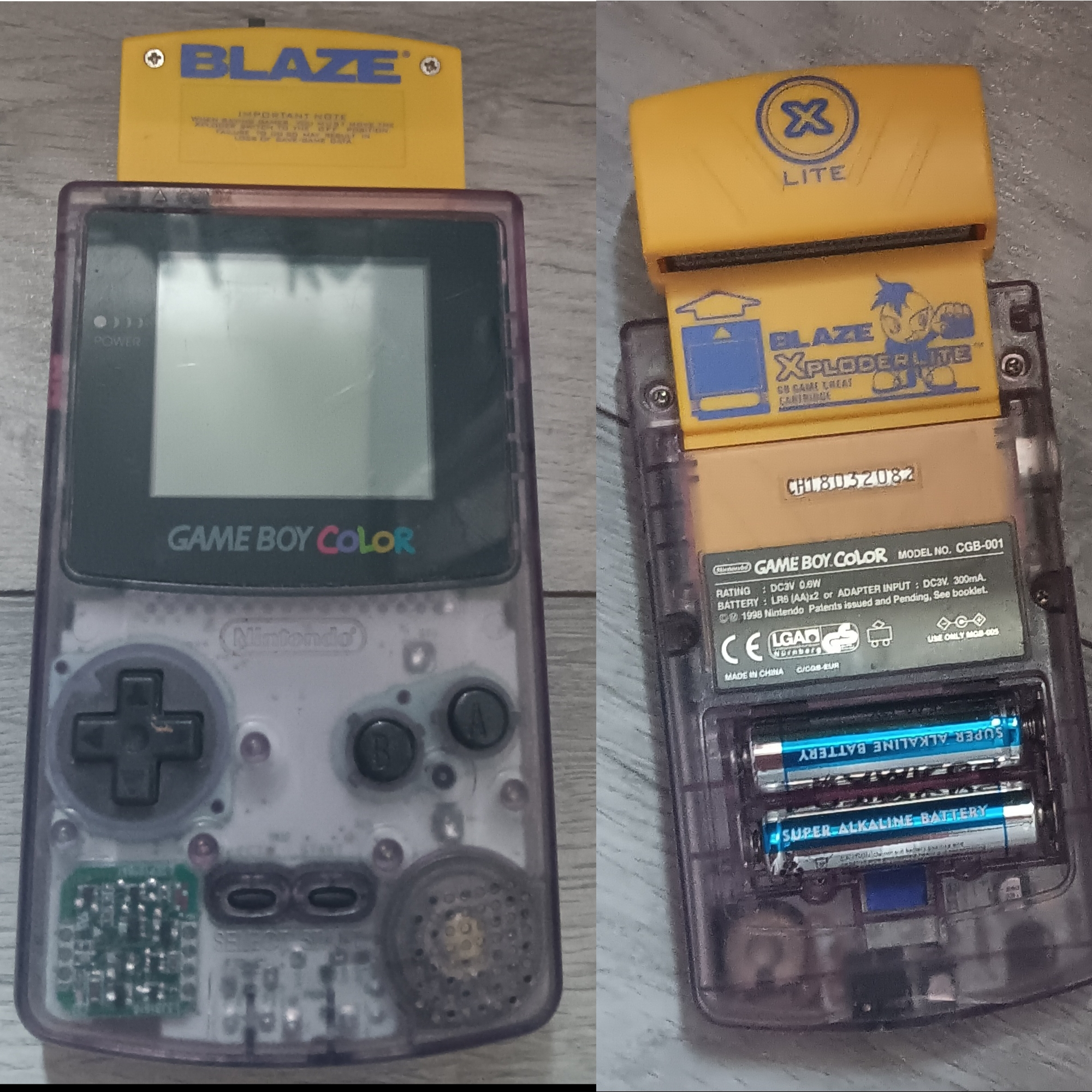
Front (left) and rear (right) view of a Blaze Xploder in a Game Boy Color

Xploder is a brand of game cheats and multimedia devices for games consoles, similar to Action Replay. Xploder products have been released for Dreamcast, PlayStation 2, PlayStation, PlayStation Portable, Xbox, GameCube, Nintendo 64, Game Boy, Game Boy Advance, PC and others. Support for the PS3, Xbox 360 and Nintendo Wii started in 2006–2007. Xploder products are often bundled with accessories for game consoles, such as Lexar's Memory Sticks for the PSP, or the X-Link cable with the PS2 V5 Media Centre version. Newer versions for the Xbox 360 and PlayStation 3 allow users to download saved games from the Internet.

Blaze Xploder released in c. 2001 for the use of the Game Boy. Another Game Boy Xploder device was released named Blaze Xploder Lite. Blaze Xploder Advance released for the use of Game Boy Advance.

In 2018, a version for PlayStation 4 was available as a free download.
