= List of cancelled Nintendo 64 games =

The Nintendo 64 (N64) is a video game console released by Nintendo in 1996. The console was a moderate success with 32.93 millions units sold; it was three times as much as one competitor, the Sega Saturn, but only a third of the sales of its other competitor, the original PlayStation. Third party game developers cancelled multiple games for the system, with commonly-cited reasons including its lower sales numbers compared to the PlayStation, its unconventional controller, and Nintendo's decision to stick with the game cartridge format, which was more costly to produce and featured far less storage than the PlayStation's CD-ROMs. Additionally, the brief lifespan and commercial failure of the 64DD, a Japan-only N64 add-on, led to many of its games being cancelled, reworked for release on the standard N64, or ported to its successor, the GameCube. This list documents games that were announced for the N64 at some point, but did not end up being released for it in any capacity. It also documents cancelled 64DD games that were not moved to N64, as well as unreleased 64DD-specific versions of other Nintendo 64 games.

== Games ==
There are currently 185 games on this list. (Note: This number is always up to date by this script.)

List of cancelled Nintendo 64 games
Title(s)	Notes/Reasons	Developer	Publisher
1080° Snowboarding 2	Pre-production planning was done on Nintendo 64 for a sequel to 1080° Snowboarding (1998), but it was cancelled early on in favor of moving development to the then-upcoming GameCube platform. While initially being worked on by Left Field Productions, Nintendo Software Technology later took over development, and the game was released as 1080° Avalanche (2003) for the GameCube.	Left Field Productions	Nintendo
3Sixty	In 1999, it was reported that the Windows release would be ported to the Nintendo 64 and PlayStation, though only the latter ever materialized.	Smart Dog	Cryo Interactive
40 Winks	A platformer in development for the Nintendo 64 and the PlayStation. The N64 version was far enough along to have review copies sent out to publications such as Nintendo Power, but just prior to the PlayStation version's 1999 release, financial troubles with the game's publisher, GT Interactive, and their subsequent buyout by Infogrames, led to the delay of the N64 version. That, combined with the PlayStation version's poor reviews, led to its cancellation. Twenty years later, Piko Interactive obtained the rights, raised money through a successful Kickstarter and released an unofficial, aftermarket N64 version of the game in 2019.	Eurocom	GT Interactive
64 Wars	An entry of Nintendo's Wars series was announced for the Nintendo 64. The game was to feature the same campaign stages as Game Boy Wars 2, with players able to share their progress with the Game Boy game via the Transfer Pak. Some game footage was briefly demonstrated at Nintendo Space World 1999, where it was shown to be developed by Hudson Soft instead of its usual developer Intelligent Systems, but little else was announced, and the game never materialized in any capacity.	Hudson Soft	Hudson Soft
7th Legion	A real-time strategy game released for Windows in 1997, it was reported that Nintendo was to work with the game's developers to create a 64DD version of the game, but this version never materialized.	Epic MegaGames	MicroProse
Actua Golf series entry / Actua Golf 4	IGN reported that multiple entries in the multiplatform Actua Golf series were scheduled to come to the Nintendo 64. Specifically, in 1999, they reported than an Actua Golf 4 was announced and in development for the N64. The title was planned on being the first to utilize the PGA European Tour license. However, later in the year, Gremlin Interactive was bought out by Infogrames and renamed to Infogrames Sheffield House, and no Actua Golf games were released on N64.	Gremlin Interactive	Gremlin Interactive
Addams Family Pinball	A video game adaption of the Addams Family pinball machine was announced to be in development for the Nintendo 64, but was never released in any capacity.	Digital Eclipse	GT Interactive
Adventure Racing 2	Work on a sequel to Beetle Adventure Racing (1999) was started shortly after the game's completion. During development, the team decided to drop the Volkswagen Beetle licensing and experiment with a number of other different non-licensed vehicles instead, leading to the name Adventure Racing 2. The game was eventually cancelled due to the original title's commercial failure.	Paradigm Entertainment	Electronic Arts
Airport Inc.	IGN reported that a Nintendo 64 port of the game was scheduled to begin production after the Windows version was finished, but this never materialized.	Krisalis Software	Telstar Electronic Studios
Animal Leader	Originally planned for the 64DD, the peripheral's failure led Animal Leader to shift its development to the Nintendo 64, for which it was presented at the Nintendo Space World 2000 trade show. The game eventually shifted development again to the GameCube, and was released in 2002. However, Nintendo chose not to localize the game for the North American market, with Atlus USA instead publishing it under the name Cubivore: Survival of the Fittest.	Saru Brunei, Intelligent Systems	Nintendo
Animaniacs: Ten Pin Alley	Released for the PlayStation in December 1998, ASC Games announced shortly thereafter that a port of the game would be coming to Nintendo 64. However, this version was never released.	Saffire	ASC Games
Aquaria	In 1997, Lobotomy Software announced their first Nintendo 64 game, Aquaria. Described as resembling an underwater version of Nights into Dreams, Enix was also said to be developing a port of the game for PlayStation. However, neither version ever released.	Lobotomy Software	
Assault	Released on the PlayStation in 1998, a Nintendo 64 version was planned but never released.	Candle Light Studios	Midway Games
Asylum	Former Monolith Productions programmer Nick Newhard developed a concept for a horror game set in an asylum that had been taken over by serial killers. When the company acquired a 64DD development kit, they decided to build a prototype of Asylum for the system in hopes that Nintendo would publish the game. While some production work was done, Nintendo rejected the pitch due to its excessively dark tone.	Monolith Productions	
Automobili Lamborghini Add-On	IGN reported Automobili Lamborghini (1997) as one of multiple Titus Interactive games to receive a separate 64DD release with additional content added from its standard Nintendo 64 release, though the 64DD version never released. While no reason was given, the standard version only released in the West, while the 64DD never released out of Japan.	Titus Interactive	Titus Interactive
BattleSport II / BioSwarm	A sequel to BattleSport (1997) was planned for the Nintendo 64 and PlayStation, but never released for any system.	Cyclone Studios	3DO
Blade & Barrel / Ultra Combat 64	Blade & Barrel, to be released as Ultra Combat 64 in the United States, was announced as a helicopter combat game set in urban environments, with an emphasis on competitive multiplayer. The game was cancelled in October 1997.	Software Creations	Kemco
Buggie Boogie	As a result of a strong partnership with Nintendo early in the Nintendo 64's development, Angel Studios began collaborating with designer Shigeru Miyamoto on the vehicular combat game Buggie Boogie. Miyamoto issued three-month contracts to the company, not retaining any documents and returning every three months to check on the game's progress. Angel Studios spent 45 days creating a "design bible" for its first meeting with Miyamoto, who rejected it and asked the studio to "find the fun" over the next three months. The game would have seen vehicles consume each other, absorbing their DNA to obtain their powers. After six to nine months, the title was canceled as Nintendo prioritized a prototype of Diddy Kong Racing (1997).	Angel Studios	Nintendo
Cabbage	A pet raising/breeding game in development by Nintendo employee Shigesato Itoi with Shigeru Miyamoto for the 64DD. The game featured a protracted development cycle between 1997 and 2000. The game was eventually cancelled without any footage ever being shown, but it was reported to have influenced the development and gameplay of future game series Animal Crossing and Nintendogs.	Nintendo	Nintendo
Caesars Palace 64	Following their acquisition by Crave Entertainment in 1998, Lobotomy Software began work on a gambling adventure game set in the Caesars Palace casino. In 1999, internal restructuring at Crave resulted in the shutdown of Lobotomy Software, and the game's release was indefinitely postponed. While it was initially reported that the game would be finished by Crave's internal development, Caesars Palace 64 ultimately never released.	Lobotomy Software	Crave Entertainment
Carnivàle: Cenzo's Adventure	A video game adaption of the 1999 animated film Carnivale in development for the Nintendo 64, the game was cancelled at about 50-60% complete after its developers suffered financial problems and layoffs that led them to be unable to complete the game. The game was demonstrated briefly at E3 1999, and in 2022, the E3 build leaked onto the internet.	Terraglyph Interactive Studios	Vatical Entertainment
Untitled Capcom game	In a 1999 report by Weekly Famitsu, Marigul Management confirmed three games were in development for the 64DD that would use their 64 GB Cable accessory: Derby Stallion 64 (2001), DT Bloodmasters, and an untitled game by Capcom being developed in collaboration with anime director and Gundam creator Yoshiyuki Tomino. The cable was never released, nor were any Capcom games released on the 64DD.		Capcom
Catroots	Appeared at E3 2000 at Nintendo's booth without even ever being previously announced. Even Nintendo of America reps at the event did not know any information beyond being instructed to show off the game at the event. Shigeru Miyamoto later gave a little background on the title — it was an N64 game in development from Marigul Management, a company Nintendo created and funded to help developers create more software for the N64. Footage shown depicted a mouse attacking a fleeing cat with lethal weapons. The game was never mentioned again after the event, not being released in any capacity.	Marigul Management	Nintendo
Cavalry Battle 3000	A racing video game announced in the late 1990s for the Nintendo 64. Little else was revealed about the game, and it never materialized in any capacity.	Japan System Supply	Japan System Supply
Centipede X	A 3D reinvention of Centipede (1981) was announced alongside several other similar arcade revivals by Midway Games, but was never shown or released in any capacity.	Midway Games	Midway Games
Championship Motocross featuring Ricky Carmichael	A Nintendo 64 version of the 1999 PlayStation release was announced to be in development by Pacific Coast Power & Light, who was previous responsible for the PlayStation to N64 conversions of Nuclear Strike 64 and Road Rash 64, but the N64 release of Championship Motocross never materialized.	Pacific Coast Power & Light	THQ
Chanbara Fighter	A 1-on-1 weapons-based fighting game featuring puppet characters was revealed in October 1999, but was never released.	Bottom Up	
Contra Spirits 64	Konami announced that an entry in their Contra series would be developed for the Nintendo 64, but by 1999, they stated that plans had been cancelled due to poor hardware sales in Japan.	KCEO	Konami
Cu-On-Pa	A Nintendo 64 version was announced in 1996, but was never released.		T&E Soft
DD Sequencer	A music creation game listed for the 64DD's Randnet online service. Little was revealed, and the game never materialized.	Nintendo	Nintendo
Dead Ahead	Dead Ahead was an adventure game that featured battles with 3D fighting game combat and music by film composer David Newman. Originally planned to launch in December 1997, the game was cancelled in October of the same year.	Optical Entertainment	Tomy
Deadly Honor	An action game featuring actor Steven Seagal announced for a late 1997 release for both the PlayStation and the Nintendo 64, the game was cancelled in its beta stages and never released in any capacity for either platform.	TecMagik	TecMagik
Dear Blue	In 1998, Konami announced a new RPG under the tentative title "Dear Blue". However, the title was never mentioned again.		Konami
Derby Day	In February 1999, IGN reported that Chunsoft was developing an RPG tentatively titled "Derby Day" for Nintendo 64, in addition to Fushigi no Dungeon: Fūrai no Shiren 2: Oni Shūrai! Shiren-jō!. However, this game was never fully revealed, and Fūrai no Shiren 2 was the company's only game released for the system.	Chunsoft	Chunsoft
Desert Island / No Man's Island / Super Real Island	Super Real Island was intended to be a hybrid RPG/simulation game for 64DD, with players cultivating an island to grow food and stay alive while contending with dangerous wildlife that emerge as a result. After being cancelled, the project later restarted development under the name Desert Island, with Imagineer considering releasing it for N64 cartridge or Dreamcast; however, the game was ultimately not released for any system.	Imagineer	Imagineer
DethKarz	A Nintendo 64 version of the 1998 Windows game release was announced, but never materialized.	Beam Software	Melbourne House
Dezaemon DD	A 64DD expansion for Dezaemon 3D was planned, which would have expanded the limits of the game's creation tools; however, this expansion ultimately never released.	Athena	Athena
Diablo	IGN reported that Nintendo had struck a deal with Blizzard Entertainment to publish Diablo (1997) on the Nintendo 64. However, this version never materialized.	Blizzard Entertainment	Nintendo
Die Hard 64	A video game adaption of the Die Hard films was never officially announced, but was reported as being in development by multiple publications, including a 1999 incident where screenshots were leaked and published by magazines. Publications reported it was scheduled for a 2000 release and classified it as a 3D first person shooter. In early 2000, the N64 version was quietly cancelled and the project was restarted for the GameCube, PlayStation 2, and Xbox, eventually releasing in 2002 as Die Hard: Vendetta.	Bits Studios	Fox Interactive
Dinosaur Planet	Originally started as an original IP for the Nintendo 64 in 1997, the game experienced a lengthy development process, which included a re-brand midway through, moving it into the Star Fox series of games. Eventually the Nintendo 64 version was cancelled in favor of moving the project to the GameCube, where it released as Star Fox Adventures (2002). A prototype of the Nintendo 64 version was leaked online in 2021.	Rare	Nintendo
Doom Absolution	After Doom 64 (1997) was completed, the development team began working on a sequel based around two-player deathmatches. In July 1997, Midway Games confirmed the project had been cancelled.	Midway Studios San Diego	Midway Games
Dragon Sword	Announced in 1997 as a The Legend of Zelda inspired game coming to the Nintendo 64 first, and Windows and the PlayStation sometime after, the game went through many changes over its multiple years of development, including a transition into a simpler, Golden Axe styled action game. Despite being near completion, the game was cancelled in 2001 due to its publisher pulling out, citing fears regarding its profitability. An early beta version leaked onto the internet in 2010. In 2019, Piko Interactive bought the rights to the game in hopes of selling an aftermarket unofficial version in the future, though this release has not materialized to-date.	Interactive Studios	MGM Interactive
Driver	According to Spanish video game magazine Magazine 64, GT Interactive was conducting development tests to see if they could get the PlayStation version of Driver (1999) on the Nintendo 64, though no such release ever materialized.	Reflections Interactive	GT Interactive
DT Bloodmasters	A game announced in relation to the formation of Marigul Management, a company co-founded by Nintendo to create more games for the Nintendo 64. It was a digital trading card game for the 64DD designed by Masanobu Endo that would have allowed for the transfer of cards to and from a Game Boy using Marigul's unreleased 64 GB Cable accessory. It also would have allowed for players to play the game on a television but hold their cards privately on their Game Boy screen. The game was cancelled due to the commercial failure of the 64DD, though its GBC counterpart, DT: Lords of Genomes, was released in 2001.	Marigul Management, Game Studio	Media Factory
Earthbound 64 / Mother 3	The third entry in the Mother video game series had an extensive 12 year development history plagued by platform changes. Originally conceived for the SNES, development was moved to the Nintendo 64 after being inspired by the 3D graphics and movement of Super Mario 64 (1996), where it went by the name Earthbound 64. However, the game's large scope, and the development transition to and from the 64DD, caused slow progress with the game, and it was eventually cancelled in favor of moving Nintendo's software teams to working on the GameCube in late 2000. Development was later restarted on Game Boy Advance, where it was reworked for its hardware and finally released, exclusively in Japan, in 2006.	HAL Laboratory	Nintendo
Echo Delta	Debuted and playable at Nintendo Space World 2000, the game was a real time strategy game with the premise centered around controlling a submarine to resurface sunken ships within a time limit. The game was reportedly 90% complete at the time, but was never officially released. In 2006, a prototype reportedly leaked and was being sold on eBay.	Marigul Management, Clever Trick	Nintendo
Emperor of the Jungle	At the Shoshinkai 1996 trade show, Nintendo announced they were developing a video game adaptation of Osamu Tezuka's Jungle Emperor manga, scheduled for release in 1998. Shigeru Miyamoto was said to be heading the project in collaboration with Tezuka's son, Makoto Tezuka. However, the game experienced development difficulties, partly due to Tezuka's busy schedule and unfamiliarity with producing video games, and was ultimately never released.	Nintendo	Nintendo
Eternal Darkness	Originally starting development in the mid/late 1990s for the Nintendo 64, the game was almost complete and playable at trade shows in 2000. A few months away from completion, Nintendo asked if developers Silicon Knights would move the project to the GameCube. Due to the request, the Nintendo 64 market starting to slow down by 2000, and the high cost of manufacturing cartridges, Silicon Knights agreed to cancel the N64 version in favor of releasing it on the GameCube in 2002. The developers described the N64 version as more of a "rough draft" of the final version; the GameCube version required significant reworking, and in that process, aspects like graphics and mechanics were refined and improved.	Silicon Knights	Nintendo
Final Fantasy VII	The earliest work on the game began on the SNES in 1994; a few months of pre-production and planning work was done, but was then dropped when much of the development staff was pulled away to finish Chrono Trigger (1995). When they returned to the project, they put together early plans on what the game could look like on the Nintendo 64 and its 64DD add-on, and did various technical tests with the N64 hardware, though no substantial work on it was finished, and the work was scrapped as they moved on to developing it for the PlayStation again, where the game released in 1997.	Squaresoft	Squaresoft
Fire Emblem 64 / Fire Emblem: Ankoku no Miko	An entry in the Fire Emblem series was reported to be in development for the Nintendo 64 and the 64DD as early as 1997. The game was in development for years, but was cancelled as a result of the commercial failure of the 64DD. Most of the game was scrapped, but a few elements were worked into the Japan-only release of Fire Emblem: The Binding Blade (2002) on the Game Boy Advance.	Intelligent Systems	Nintendo
First Samurai 64	A revival of First Samurai (1991) was announced in 1998, and was planned to emphasize 3D exploration and 1-on-1 combat. While the game was shopped to publishers, it ultimately never released.	Vivid Image	
Freak Boy	Originally announced at E3 1996 under the name "Stacker", Freak Boy was forced to undergo revisions and restart development multiple times due to management at Virgin Interactive believing the game would not appeal to the Nintendo 64 audience. The constant changes created development issues and left the game in an unstable state, forcing the project to be placed on "indefinite hold".	Zono	Virgin Interactive
Frogger	IGN reported that a port of Frogger (1997) was being considered by Hasbro Interactive, though this never came to pass.	SCE Studio Cambridge	Hasbro Interactive
Frogger 2: Swampy's Revenge	The sequel to Frogger (1997) initially began development for the Nintendo 64 in 1998, and underwent a lengthy development period. By the time the game released in 2000, the N64 version had been cancelled due to the cost of manufacturing N64 game cartridges, and instead released on CD-ROM based platforms including the PlayStation, Dreamcast, and Windows.	Interactive Studios	Hasbro Interactive
Gendai Daisenryaku: Ultimate War	An entry in the Daisenryaku series of war simulation games was presented for the 64DD at Nintendo Space World 1999. Development switched to the standard Nintendo 64 platform the following year, and was again present at Nintendo Space World 2000, though the game was never finished and never released in any capacity.	SETA Corporation	SETA Corporation
Ghouls 'n' Ghosts 64	In late 1996, a journalist at Edge was privately allowed by Capcom to play some of their games scheduled for 1997, one of which was a 3D entry in the Ghosts 'n Goblins series that played similarly to Super Mario 64. Despite an early playable build being present, the game was cancelled without any gameplay ever being released publicly. IGN speculated that Capcom scrapped it in favor of developing other titles for the PlayStation, which was Capcom's preferred platform through the late 1990s. While Capcom did return to the Nintendo 64 late in its lifespan for some PS1 ports like Mega Man 64 and Resident Evil 2, rather than revisiting the initial idea, a new idea Ghosts 'n Goblins spinoff, Maximo was started, but was cancelled as well, in favor of a PlayStation 2 release.	Capcom	Capcom
Glover 2	A sequel to Glover (1998) was announced in 1999 for a release within the following year for the Nintendo 64, intended to feature a multiplayer mode and a greater focus on story. The game was roughly 85% complete, but was cancelled after publisher Hasbro Interactive erroneously ordered far too many cartridges for the production of the original title, leaving significant unsold stock and causing the sequel to be considered a financial risk. A playable version of the game leaked onto the internet in 2011, and Piko Interactive, who acquired the Glover IP in 2018, have expressed interest in finishing and releasing the game.	Interactive Studios	Hasbro Interactive
Golden Sun 64	Shortly after the completion of Shining Force 3 (1998), Camelot Software Planning was recruited by Nintendo to develop games on the Nintendo 64. While the original request was to make another JRPG, Camelot wanted to create a simpler game while they learned how to develop for the N64's hardware, which led to the release of Mario Golf (1999). After its completion, the team returned to create a game design document for a new RPG for the N64. However, by then, they had heard about Nintendo's plan to succeed the N64 with what would be the GameCube in 2001, and knowing RPG's often have lengthy development periods, the company cancelled their plans to develop the game for N64. Instead, they developed another smaller project for the N64 with Mario Tennis (2000), and restarted their work on an RPG in what would become Golden Sun (2001) on the newly released Game Boy Advance.	Camelot Software Planning	Nintendo
Golgo 13	A video game adaption of the Golgo 13 manga series was announced in 1997, and scheduled for release in 1998, but was cancelled prior to release and never materialized in any capacity.	Vic Tokai	Vic Tokai
Gradius 64 / Gradius IV	A Nintendo 64 port of Gradius IV (1999) was planned for release in late 1999, but was cancelled due to the console's waning popularity; the game would receive a home port the following year as part of the Gradius III and IV compilation for PlayStation 2.	Konami	Konami
Grand Theft Auto	After the PlayStation version of Grand Theft Auto (1997) was released, work began on a Nintendo 64 port, which was planned to feature additional levels and improved graphics. Development of the port was ultimately cancelled in favor of allocating resources towards the game's sequel, Grand Theft Auto 2 (1999).	DMA Design	Rockstar Games
Harrier 2001	Originally announced as Flights of the U.N. at E3 1997, this flight combat game was delayed multiple times, changing its name twice to Harrier 2000 and Harrier 2001. Developer Paradigm Simulation placed the game on "indefinite hold" in November 1999, subsequently filing a lawsuit against publisher Video System alleging breach of contract in not providing sufficient support for the game's development.	Paradigm Simulation	Video System
Harry Potter and the Philosopher's Stone	In 1999, Nintendo of America sought to obtain the exclusive rights to produce games based on the Harry Potter series. Two teams within Nintendo Software Technology began developing Nintendo 64 prototypes to pitch to the rights holders, with one prototype based on the main narrative of the books while the other was based around Quidditch. The pitch was unsuccessful, with Electronic Arts ultimately obtaining the license, and no Harry Potter games were released for the N64.	Nintendo	Nintendo
Hype: The Time Quest	Released on Windows in 1999, console versions were scheduled for release across 2000 and 2001 for Nintendo 64, Dreamcast, and PlayStation 2, though only the PlayStation 2 port ever materialized.	Ubi Soft	Ubi Soft
Independence War 2: Edge of Chaos	Scheduled for release for the PlayStation, Dreamcast, Windows, and Nintendo 64, none of the console versions ever ended up releasing; only the Windows version released in 2001.	Particle Systems	Infogrames
Jeff Gordon XS Racing	The racing game Jeff Gordon XS Racing (1999) was initially planned for release on PlayStation, with versions for Nintendo 64, Windows, and Game Boy Color planned to follow. However, the PlayStation and N64 versions were cancelled, with only the Windows and GBC versions releasing.	Real Sports	ASC Games
Jest	Jest was a 3D platformer starring a trainee jester named Jax in the bizarre world of Humorous. The game was announced in 1998 for release later that year, but was pushed to 1999 before being quietly cancelled.	Curved Logic	Infogrames
Joust 64 / Joust X / Joust 3D	A 3D reinvention of the original Joust (1982) was announced as one of a number of arcade game revivals planned by Midway Games. However, the game was cancelled before any content was shown for the game, and it never released in any capacity.	Player 1	Midway Games
Jungle Bots	Details on Jungle Bots first emerged in March 1998, with the game described as a third person shooter set on a tropical island inhabited by mutated animal robots. In April 1999, it was announced that the game had been cancelled.	Conceptual Realities	Titus Interactive
Kameo	Shortly after completion of Donkey Kong 64 (1999), Rare started early work on Kameo for the Nintendo 64. By the time it was publicly announced at E3 2001, development had already shifted to the GameCube. In 2002, when Microsoft bought Rare, the GameCube version was cancelled and development was shifted to the original Xbox. The game experienced a lengthy four year development period from there, leading to it being cancelled on Xbox in favor of releasing as a launch title for the Xbox 360 in 2005.	Rare	Nintendo
Kaminari no Gotoku: Choukousoku Igo	A Go game for Nintendo 64 was announced by SETA in 1997, but was never released. A near-final prototype of the game was found and released online in 2026.	SETA Corporation	SETA Corporation
Killer Instinct	Killer Instinct (1994) was initially planned as a launch title for the Nintendo 64 in 1995, with its arcade release advertising the "Nintendo Ultra 64" home port in its attract mode. However, due to the delay of the console's launch, the game was instead ported to the SNES. A port of Killer Instinct 2 (1996), titled Killer Instinct Gold, was ultimately released shortly after the system's launch in western territories.	Rare	Nintendo
Killer Instinct 3	Developer Rare did early preliminary work on a third entry of their Killer Instinct series of fighting games for the Nintendo 64. Unlike prior entries, the game would have had fully 3D graphics, and would have been a prequel that focused on characters as children, similar to Virtua Fighter Kids (1996). However, the game was cancelled due to their belief that the popularity of fighting games was declining. A third Killer Instinct game would not see release until 2013 as a launch title for Xbox One.	Rare	Nintendo
Kirby Ball 64 / Kirby Bowl 64 / Kirby's Air Ride	Work on a sequel to Kirby's Dream Course (1994) began on the Nintendo 64 immediately after the original title's release, and was initially reported to be a launch title for the system. Early iterations of the game included controlling Kirby characters in snowboarding races and a battle mode in which player characters physically bump each other out of designated gameplay areas. Gameplay was shown at events like Nintendo Space World 1995 and E3 1996. By 1998, it was reported that the game was put on-hold while Nintendo concentrated on finishing up 1080° Snowboarding (1998). The concept was eventually reworked and released for the N64's successor, the GameCube, as Kirby Air Ride (2003).	HAL Laboratory	Nintendo
The Legend of Zelda: Ocarina of Time DD / Zelda 64 / Ura Zelda	The Legend of Zelda: Ocarina of Time (1998) was originally planned for release for the 64DD before moving development to the standard Nintendo 64 platform. After the move, Nintendo began work on an alternate, remixed version of Ocarina of Time for the 64DD called Ura Zelda. This version was completed, but the decision was made not to release it due to the 64DD's limited distribution and the cost of manufacturing N64 cartridges. The lower cost of printing optical discs led Nintendo to ultimately release the game for the GameCube in 2003 under the name The Legend of Zelda: Ocarina of Time Master Quest.	Nintendo	Nintendo
Lethal Encounter	Lethal Encounter was an arcade-style shooting game in which players controlled a tank battling alien invaders. While the game was demonstrated for journalists at Edge in 1998, it was ultimately never released.	Digital Image Design	
Looney Tunes: Space Race	The game was originally announced in March 1998 under the name of Looney Tunes Racing as one of Infogrames' first Looney Tunes titles shortly after obtaining the license. While the game was planned to be shown off at E3 1999, it was not listed in Infogrames' final lineup for the event and in August, the company announced that the game would be restarted as a title for the Dreamcast, effectively cancelling the Nintendo 64 version. Infogrames cited a lack of progress from the developer New Wave USA and an overly crowded market for racing games on the system. The revived version was developed under Infogrames Melbourne House and would be released in November 2000, with a PlayStation 2 version following in 2002.	New Wave USA	Infogrames
Luigi's Mansion	The earliest game planning and character design work was done for the Nintendo 64 late in its lifecycle, but development was moved to the GameCube very early on, where it released as a launch title.	Nintendo EAD	Nintendo
Magic Flute	A game announced for the Nintendo 64 by Sunsoft. Little is known beyond the fact that it was an action game and that it was never released in any capacity.	Sunsoft	Sunsoft
Major League Soccer / Acclaim Sports Soccer	A European-exclusive soccer game from Acclaim was announced early in the Nintendo 64's lifecycle, but was cancelled in 1999 after several delays, allegedly due to Acclaim's fears of strong competition from other soccer games on the system.	Probe Software	Acclaim Entertainment
Maker series	Outside of the Mario Artist series, Nintendo had three additional creation tools in development for the 64DD. These included Game Maker, Graphical Message Maker, and Video Jockey Maker. However, none of these three games were ever released.	Nintendo	Nintendo
Mario Artist: Sound Maker	Mario Artist was a suite of creative tools for the 64DD, which could be used in conjunction with one another to create and share art, animations, and 3D models. Four entries in the series were released between 1999 and 2000: Paint Studio, Talent Studio, Polygon Studio, and Communication Kit. A planned music-editing tool was removed from Paint Studio during development, with its functionality instead intended to appear in a fifth entry in the series, Mario Artist: Sound Maker, but this was never released.	Software Creations	Nintendo
Marionette	While never officially announced, Marionette was accidentally published on a list of titles in development by Nintendo at E3 2001; the developers would later give a few details on the project years later. The game was designed to utilize the Nintendo 64 controller in unconventional ways to control an in-game marionette puppet. Many gameplay tests were created, but it hit roadblocks in making it into a full-fledged game. With it being tied to the N64 controller, the game was cancelled in the company's transition to GameCube development later in the year.	Nintendo	Nintendo
Maximo: Ghosts to Glory	Development for the game, a sub-series of the Ghosts 'n Goblins series, originally began for the Nintendo 64, but development spanned beyond its lifespan, and Capcom made the decision to move it to the PlayStation 2 instead, where it released exclusively in 2002.	Capcom	Capcom
Mega Man 64 2 / Mega Man Legends 2	After Mega Man Legends (1998) was released on the Nintendo 64 as Mega Man 64 (2000), Capcom announced they would be doing the same with Mega Man Legends 2 (2000). However, the poor sales of Mega Man 64, coupled with the N64 approaching the end of its lifespan by the time they would have even begun porting the game in late 2000, led to its cancellation.	Capcom	Capcom
Metal Gear Solid	A version of Metal Gear Solid (1998) was reported to be in development for the Nintendo 64 in 2000, towards the end of its lifespan, by GameSpot. However, the poor hardware sales of the N64, coupled with the limited storage space of the N64 cartridges, led Konami to reconsider the plans, and nothing further on the N64 ever materialized; a remake, Metal Gear Solid: The Twin Snakes (2004), would later release on the N64's successor, the GameCube.	Konami	Konami
Metal Slader Glory 2	A prequel to Metal Slader Glory (1991) was planned for release on 64DD, but was cancelled before being officially announced, with Metal Slader Glory: Director's Cut (2000) being released for the Super Famicom instead. The game's existence was not known about until 2013, when director Yoshimiru Hoshi released a booklet detailing the original plans for the sequel.	HAL Laboratory	Nintendo
Metroid 64	Publications reported that a Metroid series game was in development for the Nintendo 64, but creator Yoshio Sakamoto struggled to figure out how Samus should move in 3D, and decided he should not be leading production on the game as a result. The project was offered to another unnamed developer, but they declined, believing they would not be able to create as good an experience as Super Metroid (1994). A 3D entry would not come until much later on the GameCube with the Retro Studios developed Metroid Prime (2002).	Nintendo	Nintendo
Michelin Rally Masters: Race of Champions / Test Drive Rally / Rally Masters	Originally announced as Rally Masters in 1999, the game saw a name change when original publisher Gremlin Interactive was bought out by Infogrames, to Test Drive Rally, and then again to its final name. Originally scheduled to release on Nintendo 64, Dreamcast, the PlayStation, and Windows, both the Nintendo 64 and Dreamcast versions were cancelled prior to the other versions' release in 2000, with Infogrames stating that those version were not meeting their internal standards, despite IGN previously previewing a playable build of the game and giving generally positive remarks.	Digital Illusions CE	Infogrames
Untitled Mickey Mouse game	In 1999, Nintendo announced a partnership with Disney to publish several games based on their properties over the next three years. This included two Nintendo 64 games, a racing game and an adventure game, both developed by Rare and starring Mickey Mouse. While the racing game was released as Mickey's Speedway USA (2000), the adventure game never came to fruition.	Rare	Nintendo
Mini Racers	A car racing game in the vein of R.C. Pro-Am announced for the Nintendo 64. The game was reportedly complete and submitted to Nintendo to publish in 2000, but its release was cancelled after the closure of its developer Looking Glass Studios. While never officially released, it reportedly leaked sometime in the mid-2000s.	Looking Glass Studios	Nintendo
Mission Impossible 64DD	A 64DD version of Mission Impossible (1998) was initially planned, but never materialized.	Infogrames	Ocean Software
Mission Impossible 2	A sequel to the original Mission Impossible (1998) Nintendo 64 game was announced, but was cancelled prior to release.	Infogrames	Ocean Software
Momotarou Festival	A spinoff entry in the Momotaro Densetsu series was initially announced for the Nintendo 64 at Nintendo Space World 2000, but only versions for the Game Boy Advance and PlayStation were released in 2001.	Hudson Soft	Hudson Soft
Monster Dunk	At E3 1995, Mindscape announced Monster Dunk, a 2-on-2 basketball game in the vein of NBA Jam that featured parodies of famous monsters as the players, such as Count Dunkula and Slamsquatch. However, the game was never released.	Mindscape	
Montezuma's Return!	A Nintendo 64 version of the 1997 Windows release was announced and entered early development, which included a new four-player split screen multiplayer mode similar to GoldenEye (1997), but the N64 version never released.	Utopia Technologies	WizardWorks
Moon Jelly / Space Jelly	A 3D platformer prototype initially designed by the Pickford Brothers, alternately titled Moon Jelly and Space Jelly, was produced and self-funded by Software Creations, but the company struggled to find a publisher and ultimately cancelled the game, along with several other projects. Previously unseen footage of the prototype later surfaced in 2022.	Software Creations	
Mortal Kombat: Special Forces	The Mortal Kombat spinoff Special Forces was initially announced for release on the Nintendo 64 and PlayStation. However, following several departures from the game's development team, including Mortal Kombat co-creator John Tobias, the Nintendo 64 version was cancelled and the PlayStation version underwent a rushed development cycle, releasing in 2000 to significantly negative reception.	Midway Games	Midway Games
Mystics	A real-time strategy game in the vein of Starcraft. It featured up to four players battling for territory of land, and used the elements in that space to create magic spells for attacking others in battle. The game never released in any capacity.	Realtime Associates	Nintendo
Myth: History in the Making	A revival of Myth: History in the Making (1989) was in development for Nintendo 64, PlayStation, Sega Saturn, and Windows. The release was delayed due to a legal dispute with Eidos Interactive, who were already releasing their own Myth series, and the game ultimately never materialized for any system.	System 3	
Need for Speed 64	Developer Electronic Arts was planning on bringing an entry in its Need for Speed series to the Nintendo 64 in 1997, but wished to develop a different sort of entry that would help it stand out from the already crowded market for racing games on the platform. Their efforts to make something different, coupled with their recent partnership with Volkswagen to make a game featuring their Volkswagen New Beetle vehicle, led to scrapping the Need for Speed title in favor of creating Beetle Adventure Racing (1999).	Paradigm Entertainment	Electronic Arts
NHL Blades of Steel 2000	Originally announced for the Nintendo 64 and the PlayStation, the N64 version was dropped from Konami's release schedule and the game only released on PlayStation in 2000. The N64 version was far enough along to have a review copy sent to Game Informer, which panned the game for having performance issues even worse than the PlayStation version.	Konami	Konami
NHRA Drag Racing	A drag racing game based on the NHRA license, unrelated to the 1998 game of the same name for Windows, was announced but never released.	Gremlin Interactive	Gremlin Interactive
Nightmare Creatures II	The game was announced for release on the Nintendo 64, Dreamcast, and the PlayStation, but the N64 version was delayed and eventually cancelled outright. Reportedly, the poor sales of the original Nightmare Creatures (1997) on the N64 led to it being the sole version cancelled.	Kalisto Entertainment	Activision/Konami
Nintendo Golf (tentative)	Nintendo had originally started development on a first party developed golf game for the Nintendo 64 while recruiting Camelot Software Planning to create a role-playing video game. Camelot desired to create a simpler game to get used to the N64's new hardware first; they previously developed Everybody's Golf, and decided to create a new golf game. Nintendo was so impressed with their prototype that they cancelled their first party golf game and assigned Camelot to develop Mario Golf (1999) instead.	Nintendo	Nintendo
O.D.T.	O.D.T. was released for PlayStation and Windows in 1998, with a Nintendo 64 port meant to follow one year later. However, while completed, this version was cancelled, though the finished build would later be leaked online. In 2020, Piko Interactive acquired the rights to the game, including the unreleased N64 version.	FDI	Psygnosis
On & Off Racing	A follow-up to MRC: Multi-Racing Championship (1997) was announced at the Nintendo Space World 1999 expo, but was never released.	Imagineer	
Onimusha: Warlords	Very early planning for the game started on the Nintendo 64, though development was later transitioned to the PlayStation 2, where it released in 2001, followed by the original Xbox the following year.	Capcom	Capcom
Oriental Blue: Ao no Tengai	A new entry in the Far East of Eden series was initially planned for release on the 64DD. However, due to development difficulties, the game was restarted and shifted to the Game Boy Advance, for which it released in 2003.	Red Company	Hudson Soft
OutSider	An open world game in which the player explores a futuristic city on motorcycle was in development, but was allegedly cancelled due to its similarities to the PlayStation game Felony 11-79 (1997). The game was never announced, and was not known about until one of its former developers shared images on social media in 2022.		
Panel de Pon 64	A sequel to Panel de Pon (1995) (Tetris Attack in English regions) was in development for the Nintendo 64, but was cancelled late in development. Alternate versions were later released in different capacities. In North America and Europe, it was reworked into a Pokémon-themed puzzle game for the Nintendo 64 called Pokémon Puzzle League (2000). In Japan, the N64 version was revived, completed, and released years later as part of the Japan-only GameCube game Nintendo Puzzle Collection (2003).	Nintendo Software Technology	Nintendo
Pikmin	The original Pikmin game started its development on the Nintendo 64, but eventually shifted to become a GameCube launch title because its stronger hardware was better for processing the large volume of characters on screen at once. The early N64 version had flat characters, similar to the style seen in Paper Mario games, to help processing on the weaker hardware.	Nintendo	Nintendo
Pilotwings 2 / Pilotwings 64 2	A sequel to Pilotwings 64 (1996) was announced in 1997 by developer Paradigm Simulation, and scheduled for a 1998 release. However, in 1998, Paradigm announced that while their pitch was positively received by Nintendo, they were unable to offer development resources to the game like they had in the prior title, and the game was cancelled. While they noted that it was possible to revive the project, another entry in the series would not be released until Pilotwings Resort (2012) for the Nintendo 3DS.	Paradigm Simulation	Nintendo
Pitfall 64	A modernized, 3D adaptation of the original Pitfall! (1982) was announced for the Nintendo 64, but never materialized. A game of a similar concept, Pitfall 3D (1998), was released for the PlayStation.	Activision	Activision
POD	Shortly after the release of POD (1997), a Nintendo 64 port of the game was announced, but ultimately was never released.	Ubi Soft	Ubi Soft
Powerslide	After its 1998 Windows release, versions for the PlayStation, arcades, and Nintendo 64 were announced, though none of the other versions ever materialized.	Ratbag Games	GT Interactive
Project Cairo	The tentatively-titled Project Cairo was an RPG that was said to utilize an unspecified major comic book license. While scheduled for a 1999 release on 64DD, the game never materialized.	Craveyard Studios	Crave Entertainment
Project Dream / Dream: Land of Giants	The game started development on the SNES as developer Rare's effort to use apply the faux-3D graphics implemented in their popular Donkey Kong Country series of platform games in a different genre. They prototyped a role-playing game, but its scope became too much for the SNES hardware to handle, and the game transitioned to the Nintendo 64. The game went through many changes with the added power of the new hardware, but ultimately, seeing Super Mario 64 (1996) made the team feel like their work would feel dated on the new platform, and they ended up cancelling the game. Some of its work would subsequently be used towards an attempt at a game more similar to Super Mario 64, which became Banjo-Kazooie (1998).	Rare	Nintendo
Puma Street Soccer	Initially released for the PlayStation and Windows in 1999, N64 Magazine reported that the release of the Nintendo 64 version would be dependent on its performance other platforms. In the end, it never released on N64.	Pixel Storm	SunSoft
Quest 2	A sequel to Quest 64 (1998) was announced in 1999. The story was set 100 years after the first game, following a new pair of heroes. However, the game was never released due to Imagineer's financial difficulties.	Imagineer	
Quest For Camelot	A video game adaption of the 1998 animated film Quest for Camelot was announced for both the Nintendo 64 and the 64DD, but both versions were cancelled due to the film's poor commercial performance. Only a radically different version for the Game Boy Color ever released.	Titus Interactive	Titus Interactive
Rampage Through Time	The game was originally planned for release on both PlayStation and Nintendo 64, though only the PlayStation version ever released.	Avalanche Software	Midway Games
Raze	Originally announced as Realms of Valor, Raze was a four-player 3D fighting game based in the Dungeons & Dragons Forgotten Realms setting. By 2000, the game had shifted development to the PlayStation, but was ultimately never released in any capacity.	Interplay Entertainment	Interplay Entertainment
Red Baron	A Nintendo 64 version of the 1990 Windows release was announced in 1995 as the first game for Nintendo platforms from developer Sierra Entertainment, but was cancelled the following year.	Dynamix	Sierra Entertainment
Resident Evil Zero	Development for the game started on the Nintendo 64 late in its lifespan, but due to the development team being unable to fit the game's data within an N64 cartridge, development transitioned to the GameCube, for which it was released in 2002. The final game retained the cancelled N64 version's premise and story, but was completely redone otherwise.	Capcom	Capcom
Rev Limit	The automotive racing game Rev Limit was first shown to members of the press at the Shoshinkai 1996 trade show. The game was later shifted to the 64DD, along with a version for the Aleck 64 arcade board, but was cancelled as a result of SETA's financial difficulties.	SETA Corporation	SETA Corporation
Riqa	Riqa was a third-person action game starring a female secret agent named Riqa. The game was announced in April 1999 and publicly shown by Nintendo at E3 later that year, drawing comparisons to Tomb Raider and Perfect Dark. Following multiple delays, the game was cancelled in 2000, with the development team at Bits Studios instead shifting to development of Die Hard 64 and Thieves World, both of which would also be cancelled for Nintendo 64 and released for sixth-generation consoles as Die Hard: Vendetta (2002) and Rogue Ops (2003) respectively. In 2024, a member of the development team released several of the game's development prototypes, including the most recent build of the game prior to its cancellation.	Bits Studios	Nintendo
Robotech: Crystal Dreams	GameTek obtained the license for the Robotech anime series in 1995 and began development on a flight simulator game set between the show's major storylines. The game was originally planned for a December 1996 release before being delayed one year. However, Crystal Dreams was ultimately cancelled due to GameTek filing for bankruptcy and being unable to find a new publisher for the game.	GameTek	
Ronaldo V-Soccer	A soccer video game featuring the likeness and endorsement of famous player Ronaldo was announced for the PlayStation and Nintendo 64; however, only the PlayStation version ever released.	PAM Development	Infogrames
Roswell Conspiracies: Aliens, Myths and Legends	A video game based on the 1999 animated series Roswell Conspiracies: Aliens, Myths and Legends began development for Nintendo 64, PlayStation, Dreamcast, and Game Boy Color, with Climax Studios developing the Dreamcast and N64 versions. While the Dreamcast version was on display at E3, the N64 version was not present due to development difficulties. Following publisher Red Storm Entertainment's acquisition by Ubi Soft, the Nintendo 64 version was cancelled, with IGN speculating this was due to the show's lack of popularity and the Nintendo 64's waning lifespan. Only the PlayStation and GBC versions were released in 2001.	Climax Studios	Red Storm Entertainment
Roto Gunners	A helicopter simulation game announced for the Nintendo 64 in 1997, with a release scheduled for the following year. It never released in any capacity.	TecMagik	TecMagik
Sea-Doo Hydrocross	Originally announced for Dreamcast, PlayStation, Nintendo 64, and Game Boy Color, only the PS1 version ever released.	Vicarious Visions	Vatical Entertainment
Seaman	Early in the planning of Seaman, game designer Yoot Saito presented the concept to longtime friend Shigeru Miyamoto, leading the two to have several discussions about producing the game for the 64DD. Ultimately, the decision was made to develop the game for the Dreamcast instead, for which it was later released in 1999.	Vivarium	Vivarium
Shadowgate Rising	Shortly before the release of Shadowgate 64: Trials of the Four Towers (1999), a sequel was announced to be in development, though this never materialized.	Infinite Ventures	Kemco
SimCopter 64	Maxis announced a Nintendo 64 port of their Windows flight game SimCopter (1996) at E3 1997. While initially a largely unchanged port of the Windows version, market trends and the limitations of the Nintendo 64 hardware led Maxis to heavily rework SimCopter 64 as a story driven action game. Originally planned for a 1998 release, conflicting ideas about the game's direction and shifting priorities at Maxis led to SimCopter 64 ultimately being cancelled.	Maxis	Maxis
The Smurfs 64	A 3D platformer based on The Smurfs was in development for several years, but never released. The game would have been separate from the concurrently developed Smurfs 2.5D platformer for the PlayStation, which released in 1999.	Infogrames	Infogrames
Snow Speeder 64DD	A 64DD port of Snow Speeder (1998), released as Big Mountain 2000 in North America, was announced in 1998 alongside two other 64DD games from Imagineer, but none of them were ultimately released.	Imagineer	Imagineer
South Park 2	A sequel to South Park (1998) was announced around the time of the release of the first game, with a prospective 2000 release date. However, it was cancelled prior to release, with the publisher instead focusing on cheaper, simpler releases in the franchise like South Park: Chef's Luv Shack (1999) and South Park Rally (2000).	Iguana Entertainment	Acclaim Entertainment
Space Bunnies Must Die!	Console versions of the 1998 Windows release were scheduled for the PlayStation and Nintendo 64, but never released, as the game was a serious commercial failure for its developers Ripcord Games, who were bought out by investors due to its poor performance. It was seen as a poor attempt to cash in on the popularity of the Tomb Raider franchise.	Jinx/Ripcord Games	Take-Two Interactive
Spooky	The adventure game Spooky would have featured a human protagonist summoned to another world and granted the ability to transform into different creatures. The game was announced in October 1997, but no further mention of the game was made after that point.	International Computer Entertainment	
Spy Hunter Returns	A new Spy Hunter game was announced in 1997, planned for release between late 1998 and early 1999. However, the Nintendo 64 version would go on to be cancelled, and the game would ultimately release for the subsequent console generation as SpyHunter (2001).		Midway
Street Fighter III	IGN reported that the 1997 arcade game was in development for the 64DD, but the only home version that ever materialized was for the Dreamcast in 1999.	Capcom	Capcom
Street Fighter EX	A Nintendo 64 version of their 1996 arcade game was announced, but was cancelled in favor of a 1997 PlayStation version.	Capcom	Capcom
Super Hornet F-18	A combat flight simulation game originally announced for the Nintendo 64 in 1998, the game only ended up releasing on Windows as F/A-18E Super Hornet (2000).	Titus Interactive	Titus Interactive
Super Mario 64 DD	A separate version of Super Mario 64 (1996) was announced and presented at Nintendo Space World 1996. However, the 64DD version was never released. Prototypes of the game leaked onto the internet years later, though they do not demonstrate any noteworthy differences from the original release.	Nintendo EAD	Nintendo
Super Mario 64 2	A proposed sequel for the original Super Mario 64 (1996) was mentioned by Nintendo as early on as 1997. Reports mentioned it being in development for either Nintendo 64 or the 64DD, and featuring more playable characters than just Mario, most notably Luigi. The game was never released, with Mario creator Shigeru Miyamoto stating that work done on the title was implemented into other games instead. Work on a follow-up continued until the title Super Mario 128, which also went unreleased, and a Super Mario 64 sequel would not arise until Super Mario Sunshine (2002) on the GameCube.	Nintendo EAD	Nintendo
Survivor: Day One	Announced at E3 1998, Survivor: Day One was a third-person action game in which a humanoid experiment must find his missing female companion and escape a sinking alien ship. The game received mixed reception from the press due to its poor controls and performance. In December 1998, Konami confirmed that the game had been cancelled.	Konami	Konami
Suul	Suul was an RPG for 64DD described as a "traditional Japanese adventure". It was announced in 1998, alongside two other 64DD games from Imagineer, but none of them were ultimately released.	Imagineer	Imagineer
Sydney 2000	A video game adaption of the Sydney 2000 Olympic Games was announced for the PlayStation, Dreamcast, Windows, Game Boy Color, and Nintendo 64. The N64 version was cancelled after it had been delayed past the event itself.	Attention to Detail	Eidos Interactive
Tenchu: Stealth Assassins	The original entry in the Tenchu series was initially planned for release on both the PlayStation and Nintendo 64, but developer Acquire decided to focus on only a single console in order to ensure the game's quality, leading the N64 version to be cancelled while the PlayStation version was released in 1998.	Acquire	
Teo 64DD	Publisher Hudson Soft announced that a follow-up to Fin Fin on Teo the Magic Planet (1996), a simulation game in the vein of Hey You Pikachu (1998), was scheduled for release on the 64DD. Like Hey You Pikachu, it was planned to support the Voice Recognition Unit accessory, though the game never materialized.	Fujitsu	Hudson Soft
Thieves World	Originally in development for Nintendo 64, the game would be heavily reworked and pushed to the next generation of consoles, eventually releasing for GameCube, PlayStation 2 and Xbox as Rogue Ops (2003).	Bits Studios	Kemco
Thrasher: Skate and Destroy	Originally announced for the PlayStation and Nintendo 64, only the PlayStation version ever materialized.	Z-Axis	Take 2
ToeJam & Earl III	After regaining the rights to the ToeJam and Earl IP in 1995, creator Greg Johnson expressed interest in bringing the series to a non-Sega console. In November 1998, GT Interactive signed a deal with Johnson to publish a new entry for the Nintendo 64. However, in April 1999, the deal was reported to have fallen through due to the Nintendo 64's waning popularity and GT Interactive's belief that the game would not be commercially successful in Europe. Development was subsequently restarted by Sega subsidiary Visual Concepts for the Sega Dreamcast, then shifted to the Xbox, for which it was released in 2002.	ToeJam & Earl Productions	GT Interactive
Tomb Raider	In 1997, Core Design opened negotiations with Nintendo to release a Nintendo 64 version of Tomb Raider (1996), and started work on the port in anticipation of the negotiations being successful. However, the team never received N64 development kits, and the port was scrapped when Sony finalized a deal to keep subsequent Tomb Raider games exclusive to PlayStation until the year 2000.	Core Design	Eidos Interactive
Tommy Thunder	Originally announced for the Nintendo 64, development later shifted to the PlayStation, though this version also went unreleased.	Player 1 Studios	ASC Games
Tonic Trouble Add-On	At E3 1997, Ubi Soft announced that a 64DD expansion of Tonic Trouble (1999) would be released some time after the cartridge version. However, the company stated the following year that they were not focusing on a 64DD version due to Nintendo not announcing a release date for the peripheral.	Ubi Soft	Ubi Soft
Toon Panic	Toon Panic was a 3D fighting game in the vein of the Power Stone series. The game was not widely known about until 2007, when a prototype version appeared online.	Bottom Up	
Top Gun 64	Prior to the Nintendo 64's American release, MicroProse announced an aerial combat game for the system based on the 1986 film Top Gun, but cancelled the game before beginning development, eventually developing Top Gun: Fire at Will (1996) for PlayStation instead. In 1999, Titus Interactive announced they had acquired the Top Gun license and were planning to release a new game for multiple consoles, including N64. However, this version was never released; Titus would later release Top Gun: Combat Zones for PlayStation 2, GameCube, Windows, and Game Boy Advance between 2001 and 2004.	Digital Integration	Titus Interactive
Transformers	In 1994, Takara announced the cancellation of a Transformers game being developed for SNES, and that the project would instead be released in 1995 on the next generation of consoles, including the Nintendo 64, then known as "Project Reality". However, these ports were also never released.	Argonaut Software	Takara
TrickStyle	The hoverboard racing game TrickStyle (1999) was announced for the Nintendo 64 under its early name of "Project Velocity", but only released on Dreamcast and Windows.	Criterion Games	Acclaim Entertainment
Turrican 64 / Thornado	A Nintendo 64 entry in the Turrican series was announced in 1997. By 1998, the game's name had been changed to Thornado. Around the year 2000, development transitioned to a GameCube release instead. Development progressed far enough along to have a short playable demo at Nintendo Space World 2000, but went silent in the years following. While a trademark was renewed in 2004, it never released in any capacity.	Factor 5	
UEFA Soccer '98	Ocean Software announced the development of a soccer game bearing the UEFA license in 1997, but the game was never released.	PAM Development	Ocean Software
Ultra Descent	After the Windows release of Descent (1995), a number of console versions were announced, including versions for the 32X, Sega Saturn, PlayStation, and Nintendo 64. The proposed N64 version went under the name Ultra Descent, an allusion to the platform's early name of "Ultra 64". Only the PlayStation version ever released; all other versions were cancelled due to development issues.	Interplay Entertainment	Interplay Entertainment
Ultra Genjin	A new entry in the Bonk series was planned for release on Nintendo 64. However, the development team struggled to figure out how to adapt the 2D Bonk games' mechanics into 3D, eventually leading the project to be cancelled. Work done on the game was later repurposed and adapted to create Bomberman Hero (1998).	A.I Co., Ltd	Hudson Soft
Unreal	A version of the 1998 Windows game was in development for the 64DD, with consideration towards a standard Nintendo 64 version as well, though they conceded it would be difficult with the limited storage space in its cartridges. The matter was further complicated by publisher GT Interactive's financial issues and the 64DD's lack of release outside of Japan, and neither version ever materialized.	Epic Games	GT Interactive
Vampire Circus	In the late 1990s, Ste and John Pickford began developing an action game with a focus on cooperative multiplayer similar to Gauntlet Legends. The two later set the game aside to focus on other projects, though they ultimately never returned to it. However, dynamic fluid techniques designed for Vampire Circus would inspire the creation of Wetrix (1998), while the game's engine would be reused for Taz Express (2000).	Zed Two	
Velvet Dark	In 2015, Rare developer Gregg Mayles revealed that after the completion of Perfect Dark (2000) for the Nintendo 64, the company had started work on a spinoff game called Velvet Dark, starring the sister of Perfect Dark protagonist Joanna Dark. While Mayles stated that development was proposed for the Nintendo 64, the shared design documents proposed Game Boy Advance connectivity, something only its successor the GameCube had hardware compatibility for, leading publications to believe it was in development for GameCube as well. In a 2016 retrospective, designer Duncan Botwood elaborated that while some pre-production work was done on Velvet Dark, the game was never approved for full production. A Perfect Dark sequel would not be released until Perfect Dark Zero (2005) for the Xbox 360.	Rare	Nintendo
Viewpoint 2064	A 3D sequel to the Neo Geo game Viewpoint (1992) was presented by Sammy Studios at Space World 1999, planned for release in November 2000. However, despite being close to completion, the game was ultimately cancelled due to undisclosed development issues. Prototypes of the game have surfaced since its cancellation, including a seemingly final ROM that was distributed online in 2025.	Racdym	Sammy Studios
VR Sports Powerboat Racing	A version of the 1998 Windows and PlayStation release was later planned for the Nintendo 64 as well. However, the port was cancelled prior to formal production due to the state of the market for the platform by the time they were looking to start work on in 2001.	Terra Glyph Interactive Studios	Vatical Entertainment
VRS Racer	A racing video game that would have utilized the Nintendo 64's Voice Recognition Unit accessory to give verbal commands as an input method in the game. Like many Marigul games, it was announced late in the console's lifespan, and never ended up releasing in any capacity.	Marigul Management	Nintendo
Wall Street 64	A stock market simulation game in development by Nintendo for the 64DD across 1999 and 2000. Little was revealed about the game other than it revolved around the buying and selling of stock, and it was never released in any capacity.	Nintendo	Nintendo
War: Final Assault	Home console ports of the arcade game War: Final Assault (1999) were announced shortly before its release, including one for the Nintendo 64, but these console versions were all cancelled.	Atari Games	Midway Games
Warball	The dodgeball game Warball was cancelled due to the closure of its developer, Looking Glass Studios.	Looking Glass Studios	
Waterworks	The puzzle game Waterworks was announced to be coming to Windows, with a Nintendo 64 version to follow, but never released.	Optimus	
Wet Corpse	Announced for the Sega Saturn and Nintendo 64 and present at E3 1996, very little was known about the title other than it was a survival horror game in the vein of Resident Evil (1996). Following its initial showing, the game never materialized in any capacity.	Vic Tokai	Vic Tokai
Wild Metal Country	The tank-based action game was originally announced for release on both Nintendo 64 and Windows, but only the latter version released in 1999, followed by a Dreamcast port in 2000.	DMA Design	Rockstar Games
Wild Water World Championships	The racing game Wild Water World Championships was first revealed for Nintendo 64 in 1999. Shortly thereafter, this version was cancelled, alongside a prospective Dreamcast port, with the game eventually releasing on PlayStation and Windows as Renegade Racers (1999).	Promethean Designs	Interplay Entertainment
WildWaters	WildWaters was a Kayak-based racing game first shown behind closed doors at E3 1999. While anticipated for a Q4 1999 release, the game failed to materialize.	Looking Glass Studios	Ubi Soft
X-Men: Mutant Academy	Following the release of X-Men: Mutant Academy (2000) on PlayStation, an expanded version was announced for the Nintendo 64, but was cancelled prior to release.	Paradox Development	Activision
Untitled X-Men game	In addition to X-Men: Mutant Academy, a second game related to the X-Men franchise was announced by publisher Activision for the Nintendo 64, though it never materialized in any capacity.		Activision
Xena: Warrior Princess	An action-RPG based on the 1995 TV series Xena: Warrior Princess was scheduled to begin development following the completion of Xena: Warrior Princess: The Talisman of Fate (1999). However, the game failed to materialize.	Titus Interactive	Titus Interactive
Yoshi Racing	After the success of the original Star Fox (1993), developer Argonaut Software pitched bringing the Super Mario series into 3D gameplay, with a game that took the Yoshi character and combined the gameplay of Super Mario World (1990) and Super Mario Kart (1992). However, Nintendo rejected the pitch, saying that they already had plans for the first 3D Super Mario. Argonaut instead stripped the Super Mario branding from the game and repurposed it into Croc: Legend of the Gobbos (1997), which released on the competing Sega Saturn and the PlayStation instead. A Nintendo 64 port of Croc would not be released until 2027.	Argonaut Software	Nintendo
Young Olympians / Saffire	A mission-based action game featuring characters from Greek mythology, it was later renamed Saffire and shifted to GameCube and PlayStation 2 once the N64 was nearing the end of its lifespan. The story was also set to be expanded through versions for Game Boy Color and Game Boy Advance and a comic miniseries from Image Comics. While the comics were released in April 2000, the game was cancelled early in both systems' console cycles, though some of the game's elements were later used in Barbarian (2002).	Saffire	Saffire
Zenith	Developed by DMA Design, Zenith was a competitive platformer featuring climbers racing to the top of a wall. However, due to the troubled production cycle of another DMA game, Body Harvest (1998), Zenith was cancelled and its team was moved to that project to assist in its completion.	DMA Design	
