= PGA Tour 97 =

1996 video game

- Developer(s): EA Sports
- Publisher(s): EA Sports
- Series: PGA Tour
- Platform(s): PlayStation, Sega Saturn
- Release: PlayStation: NA: October 3, 1996; EU: October 1996; Sega Saturn: NA: November 25, 1996; EU: December 6, 1996
- Genre(s): Sports
- Mode(s): Single-player, multiplayer

PGA Tour 97 is a sports video game developed and published by EA Sports for PlayStation and Sega Saturn in 1996.

== Development ==
The game was announced at E3 1996.

== Reception ==
PGA Tour 97 received mixed reviews. Reviewing the PlayStation version, Dr. Zombie of GamePro praised the challenge offered by the new courses, the new camera views, and the retention of the strong assets of the previous installment. He concluded that "Two new courses and some snazzy enhancements make PGA Tour '97 more of the same but better!" GameSpot's Glenn Rubenstein was more frustrated by the fact that the game was no more than a simple update of the previous installment, and argued that more radical change was needed. While acknowledging it to be "a complete golf package that updates 32-bit golfing as we know it", he scored it a 5.9 out of 10.

Reviewing the Saturn version, GamePro's Air Hendrix remarked, "At first glance, PGA '97 has all the right answers: 14 PGA pros; 2 PGA courses; responsive, details controls; and a full set of modes and features. But the long load times and sluggish frame rate require more patience than an afternoon of fishing. Even worse, the disappointing course graphics look almost 16-bit, though the player animations are excellent." He recommended Saturn owners get VR Golf '97 instead. Rob Allsetter of Sega Saturn Magazine gave it 68%, calling it "A decidedly lacklustre version of PGA Tour". He remarked that the loading times between shots disrupt the flow of the game, and the odd shading on the power bar makes it hard to judge when it is on the line. Echoing GamePro, he recommended readers get Actua Golf (the European title for VR Golf '97) instead.
