= Beetle Crazy Cup =

2000 video game

- North American cover art
- Developer: Xpiral
- Publisher: Infogrames
- Producer: Eric Guérin
- Composer: Laurent Lombard
- Platform: Microsoft Windows
- Release: EU: 11 February 2000; NA: 6 April 2000
- Genre: Racing
- Modes: Single-player, multiplayer

Beetle Crazy Cup, released as Beetle Buggin' in North America, and as Käfer Total in Germany, and as Radiсal Drive in Spain, is a 2000 racing video game developed by Xpiral and published by Infogrames for Microsoft Windows. The game features vehicles by Volkswagen as part of a licensing deal between Infogrames and the automotive company.

== Gameplay ==
The player begins the game with a standard 1960s Volkswagen Beetle; additional vehicles become available after the player wins races and earns points. The game features 20 race tracks that include environmental elements such as rain and bright sunshine, and includes 17 vehicles that come in more than 50 different styles. In addition to original and New Beetles, the game also features the Volkswagen Karmann Ghia, the Volkswagen Thing and Volkswagen buses as playable vehicles. The game includes three gameplay modes: Quick Race, Championship, and Beetle Challenge. Each mode is further divided into five racing modes, known as events, that vary the gameplay:

- Buggy: a beach race in which the player must avoid wet sand.
- Cross: a stadium with a dirt track consisting of dunes and slopes.
- Jump: a track in which the player uses "nitro boosters" to achieve a large jump.
- Monster: a track filled with obstacles in which the player's vehicle is transformed into a monster vehicle with four large tires. The player must smash other vehicles and cause destruction within a time limit, while avoiding traffic cones.
- Speed: a street race on a two-lane highway with no nitrous boosters or large obstacles.

Specific types of vehicles are used for each event. The game includes a multiplayer mode for two to six players, using a local area network.

== Development and release ==
Beetle Crazy Cup was developed by Xpiral and published by Infogrames. Miguel Tartaj, an executive producer at Xpiral, explained that the idea for the game's concept "came from doing all sorts of driving trials. VW had just announced the launch of the New Beetle and we are all 'classic' Beetle enthusiasts so we decided to focus on the Beetle and give it what it deserves: a great game dedicated just to it. The Beetle has always been very popular and people have done incredible things with it since it was first designed." Xpiral secured a publishing agreement with Infogrames after a few meetings.

Infogrames signed a licensing deal with Volkswagen to feature the automotive company's vehicles in the game. Xpiral worked on the game for two years. The game was developed with Ambush, an original 3D game engine that was created by Xpiral. The game was announced by Infogrames in December 1999. The game was released in Europe on 11 February 2000, and in the United States on 6 April 2000.

== Reception ==
Reception

Aggregate score
| Aggregator | Score |
|---|---|
| GameRankings | 72% |

Review scores
| Publication | Score |
|---|---|
| AllGame | 4.5/5 |
| CNET Gamecenter | 6/10 |
| Computer Games Strategy Plus | 3.5/5 |
| Computer Gaming World | 2.5/5 |
| Edge | 7/10 |
| EP Daily | 8/10 |
| GameSpot | 6.9/10 |
| GameSpy | 78% |
| IGN | 7.2/10 |
| Next Generation | 3/5 |
| PC Gamer (US) | 60% |

Beetle Crazy Cup received "average" reviews according to the review aggregation website GameRankings. Anthony Baize of AllGame called the game "a gem for racing fans and Volkswagen aficionados". Baize praised the game's graphics and its surf music, and wrote that the "best aspect" was the event modes. Tom Price of Computer Gaming World wrote that it "is a near-perfect replication of the unique sensation of owning and driving an older Volkswagon [sic]." Price noted the vehicles' "cartoony" graphics, "tinny and farty" sound effects, and wrote that they "handle like crap, just like a real VW," but stated that the game "has a weird fun factor" because of its various gameplay modes and diverse lineup of Volkswagen vehicles aside from Beetles.

Amer Ajami of GameSpot wrote that the different game modes keep Beetle Crazy Cup "fresh and enjoyable", but criticized the Jump and Monster events for difficulty relating to the controls. Ajami wrote that the vehicles "are modeled with a fair amount of detail and are skinned using adequate texture sizes. However, the tracks are somewhat lacking by comparison: The textures used along most of the courses are washed out, and sprite-based trees, crowds, and other outlying objects are typical throughout the entire game." However, Ajami noted that the game's graphics were "on par with similar racing games."

Jeff Nash of The Electric Playground called the game's controls "surprisingly solid" but criticized the small number of tracks offered in each racing event, and felt that the game did not offer enough vehicles. Because of the "sluggish" controls, Nash wrote that the Monster event was "a bore to play as the slow movement makes it very difficult to stay interested." Nash noted that the Speed mode "is by far the most fun" because of its "nice selection of tracks with just the right amount of twists and turns", and stated that the Buggy and Cross events "are both respectable, but the unimaginative track design in these modes makes their races wear thin too quickly." Nash wrote that the game's images "are very crisp, and the details around the track are well above average. The graphics do suffer where effects are concerned, however. Reflection, lighting, and smoke effects are all very bland, and often seem to have been thrown in just for the sake of having them there." Nash praised the sound effects, but wrote that the music "is so abysmal that it could drive almost anyone to the brink of insanity in no time."

Jim Preston of Daily Radar gave the game a positive "Hit" rating, but called the Monster event mode "the weakest of the five modes, as we really weren't interested in avoiding cones or mastering precision driving in a monster truck." Preston noted that the graphics "are, not surprisingly, ok. The cars are shiny and realistic, but there is no damage modeling, so plowing headfirst into a guard rail won't cause a scratch. And don't look for any icing on the cake; there are no realtime shadows, 32-bit color or colored lighting here. But the weather effects are fairly realistic, and the night drives through the gloom are actually rather pretty. The backgrounds during the Speed and Buggy modes are realistic and colorful, although not widely varied." Preston concluded that Beetle Crazy Cup was an "unpretentious little game that doesn't claim to be anything more than a budget title."

Rich Rouse of IGN wrote that the game had "quite possibly the most entertaining comedic intro in the history of PC racing games," and noted the use of the words "Beetle Racin'" several times in the introduction sequence, "as if to signify that this was the title of the game when it in fact should read 'Beetle Crazy Cup.' This little tidbit lends to the hypothesis that either the title was changed towards the end of production and there wasn't enough time to alter the intro, or that this was simply a glaring error of the quality assurance team." Rouse called the graphics "extremely impressive," but criticized the music: "Sounding like a cross between old school country and a circus clown melody, the orchestration here is more than disturbing. Conversely, it must be admitted that these tunes seemed oddly consistent with the general feel of the game."

Dave Kosak of GameSpy noted the "average" sound effects and "top notch" music, and praised the artificial intelligence, but criticized the game for a lack of customizable vehicles and multiplayer options, as well as the absence of a track editor and the inability to configure tracks. Kosak noted the large number of race tracks and game modes, and wrote that "the engine is fast and smooth, and the gameplay is a blast. In that respect, the game is a lot like the car it represents. It's not fancy, but it gets the job done, and it's got tons of style and personality." Steve Bauman of Computer Games Strategy Plus wrote, "A simple and fun race game like Beetle Buggin' amuses you for a few days, and after seeing everything you can possibly see, you'll put it on the shelf and occasionally dust it off for a bit more fun. It has little long-term value, but delivers plenty of short-term kicks." William Brown of The Daily Telegraph said he was disappointed by Beetle Crazy Cup and its "sluggish" and difficult controls, writing, "Never has steering been so difficult in a game that should be pure driving joy. The flower power nostalgia does not redeem what could have been a minor classic." Jim Preston of NextGen called it "Fun and colorful. It's the kind of game your mom would buy."

== See also ==
- Beetle Adventure Racing
