= Marigul Management =

Defunct Japanese video game company

Marigul Management Inc.
- Type: Defunct
- Industry: Video games
- Founded: July 1996; 30 years ago
- Defunct: May 2003
- Fate: Liquidation
- Headquarters: Tokyo, Japan
- Products: Games for Nintendo video game consoles

Marigul Management Inc. was a Japanese corporation created and jointly owned by video game company Nintendo Co., Ltd. (40%) and media company Recruit (60%). Its name is a combination of Nintendo's mascot Mario and Recruit's mascot Seegul.

Marigul was founded because the Nintendo 64 was not getting enough third-party support. Marigul would provide financing, to let game studios focus on making games. The only condition was that the studios would have a game ready in five years.

== Studios ==
Marigul provided services for the video game studios Ambrella, Clever Trick, Noise, Param, and Saru Brunei. Although Marigul was liquidated in May 2003, Noise continues to make games, as did Ambrella until it was disbanded in 2020. Many games financed by Marigul have not been localized or released in North America.

=== Saru Brunei ===
Saru Brunei is a Tokyo-based art studio that currently serves as the label used by artist Gento Matsumoto for his work. They worked in partnership with Nintendo between 1996 and 2003 as a part of Marigul Management.

Saru Brunei was responsible for the cancelled Nintendo 64 game, Doubutsu Banchou (lit. Animal Leader), which was coded by Intelligent Systems. The studio then ported the game to the GameCube as Cubivore: Survival of the Fittest in 2002. The game was published by Nintendo in Japan, but published by Atlus in North America. Other games include Pop-up Computer for computers and Jungle Park for a variety of platforms.

=== Clever Trick ===
Clever Trick was a video game development company that worked in partnership with Nintendo. Clever Trick was a part of Marigul Management.

== Cancelled games ==
Catroots appeared at E3 2000 at Nintendo's booth without even ever being previously announced. Even Nintendo of America reps at the event did not know any information beyond being instructed to show off the game at the event. Shigeru Miyamoto later gave a little background on the title - it was an N64 game in development from Marigul Management, a company Nintendo created and funded to help developers create more software for the N64. Footage shown depicted a Itchy and Scratchy dynamic between a cat and mouse character. The game was never mentioned again after the event, and was cancelled, not being released in any capacity.

DT Bloodmasters was a digital trading card game for the 64DD that would have allowed for the transfer of cards to and from a Game Boy using the 64 GB Cable. It would have allowed for players to play the game on a television but hold their cards privately on their Game Boy screen. The game was cancelled due to the commercial failure of the 64DD, though its Game Boy Color counterpart, DT: Lords of Genomes, was released in 2001.

Echo Delta debuted and playable at Nintendo Space World 2000, the game was a real time strategy game with the premise centered around controlling a submarine to resurface sunken ships within a time limit. Was reportedly 90% complete at the time, but the game was cancelled and never officially released. In 2006, the game reportedly leaked and was being sold on eBay.

VRS Racer was a racing video game that would have utilized the Nintendo 64's microphone add-on from Hey You Pikachu to give verbal commands as an input method in the game. It was announced in 1999, but never ended up releasing in any capacity.
