= Big Mountain 2000 =

1998 video game

- North American Nintendo 64 cover art
- Developer: Imagineer
- Publishers: JP: Imagineer; NA: SouthPeak Interactive
- Composers: Iku Mizutani; Hikaru Tamura; Kinuyo Yamashita
- Platform: Nintendo 64
- Release: JP: December 26, 1998; NA: October 10, 2000
- Genre: Skiing/snowboarding
- Modes: Single-player, multiplayer

Big Mountain 2000, known in Japan as Snow Speeder (スノースピーダー, Sunō Supīdā), is a skiing/snowboarding video game for the Nintendo 64.

== Gameplay ==
A screenshot of Big Mountain 2000 gameplay on a Nintendo 64 emulator

Big Mountain 2000 puts the player in control of one of six racers of varying abilities using either snowboard or skis. There are three different modes to choose from: a single-player Championship, a 2-player Multiplayer mode, and Time Attack. The player can edit their selected racer's loadout of snowboard/skis and clothing to compliment or detriment their various stats. There are three race types: Free Ride, slalom and Giant slalom. On top of trying to beat their own personal record, the player also has a countdown timer which will disqualify them from the race if it reaches zero. Time can be added by passing through one of the two Checkpoints on their selected stage during Free Ride or passing through the flags on the slalom courses. Players can perform tricks by moving the control stick and pressing the B button in mid-air. The player also has a stamina meter that decreases after wiping out, collision with another racer, or uneven landings from a jump, with longer time intervals between falling and getting up each time the racer falls over.

As the player progresses through the game, their Speed, Cornering, and Cool stat will increase. Once a certain level of Speed and Cornering is achieved (which vary on the racer's base skills), the Racer will rank up from Amateur to Semi-Pro, Professional, and Snow Speeder, unlocking six more pieces of gear per rank (one item for each racer that can be worn by any character excluding the unlockable characters).

After completing all race types using skis and snowboards in each of the four stages, a mirror mode Championship is unlocked. Upon completion of all 24 races again in the mirror mode, three bonus characters are unlocked (which are alluded to in the game's instruction manual).

== Development ==
The game was showcased at the Tokyo Game Show held on September 5-7, 1997.

== Release ==
The game was released in Japan under the title Snow Speeder in 1998 almost two years before its North American release.

== Reception ==
Reception

Aggregate score
| Aggregator | Score |
|---|---|
| GameRankings | 67% |

Review scores
| Publication | Score |
|---|---|
| GameSpot | 5.4/10 |
| GameZone | 9/10 |
| IGN | 6/10 |
| Nintendo Power | 5.8/10 |

The game received "average" reviews according to the review aggregation website GameRankings.
