= Actua Golf =

1996 video game

- European Saturn box art
- Developer: Gremlin Interactive
- Publishers: EU: Gremlin Interactive; NA: VR Sports
- Series: Actua Sports
- Platforms: PlayStation, Sega Saturn
- Release: PlayStation: EU: 18 October 1996; NA: 30 October 1996; Saturn: EU: October 1996; NA: 20 December 1996
- Genre: Sports (golf)
- Modes: Single-player, multiplayer

Actua Golf (released as VR Golf '97 in North America) is a 1996 golf video game developed and published by Gremlin Interactive for the PlayStation and Sega Saturn.

== Gameplay ==
Actua Golf features two fictional golf courses. The game includes various modes, such as four-ball, match, skins, and stroke. Options such as mulligans and gimmes are also available. The player can select the golfer's outfit and skin color. Selectable weather conditions include dry, damp, and wet. Various camera angles are also featured. The game has several golf commentators, including Peter Alliss and Pat O'Brien.

== Development and release ==
Actua Golf was developed and published by Gremlin Interactive. In Europe, it was released for the PlayStation on October 18, 1996, followed by a Sega Saturn release sometime in that same month. In North America, the game was released for the same consoles under the title VR Golf '97. The U.S. version was published by VR Sports, a division of Interplay. A Nintendo 64 version of VR Golf '97 was scheduled for release in late 1997, but it was cancelled. The game was released on Microsoft Windows on Steam by Pixel Games UK in December 2022.

== Reception ==
Reception

Review scores
Publication	Score
Computer and Video Games	5/5 (PlayStation)
Edge	7/10 (PlayStation)
GameSpot	5.7/10 (PlayStation)
IGN	8/10 (PlayStation)
Mean Machines Sega	92/100 (Saturn)
Sega Saturn Magazine	90% (Saturn)

GamePro reviewer "Air Hendrix" considered the PlayStation version a close competitor to PGA Tour 97. Reviewing the Sega Saturn version, Air Hendrix wrote that the game "has what PGA '97 doesn't have: fast, clean action and spectacular course graphics." The latter review concluded that while the game "has plenty of room to improve, it ranks at the top of this year's Saturn leaderboards." IGN stated that golf games "have never been a success for console systems" but that VR Golf '97 "beats the odds and successfully combines PC features and console gameplay." Two reviewers for Electronic Gaming Monthly (EGM) called the game addictive. A couple of reviewers for GameFan considered it among the best games available at that time, and two reviewers for Mean Machines Sega considered it the best golf game for the Saturn. Jeff Kitts of GameSpot, reviewing the PlayStation version, wrote that "there's nothing remotely 'VR,' as in virtual reality, about VR Golf '97." Kitts wrote, however, that the game "delivers just about everything, in terms of gameplay, one could ask for in a video game simulation."

The graphics received some praise. However, Kitts stated that the game did not take advantage of the PlayStation's capabilities and that it "fails miserably in the graphics department." Kitts stated that the environments were generic and "frightfully dull," and that the golfer "is downright droopy" and "a jagged-edged graphic disaster." Air Hendrix stated that the Saturn version was "a bit choppier" than its PlayStation counterpart, and wrote that the "smoothly moving players look far too elongated, which detracts from the realism." Edge considered the players to be "gangly".

The game's abundance of options was praised. The variety of camera angles received some praise as well. Air Hendrix considered the putting too easy, while Edge complained of inaccuracies regarding the putting system.

EGM's reviewers praised the commentary. Stephen Fulljames of Computer and Video Games wrote that Alliss "provides an accurate, and somewhat acerbic commentary throughout." Edge praised the inclusion of Alliss as commentator but stated that his remarks become repetitive. Kitts considered the commentary "boring and repetitive." Air Hendrix wrote that O'Brien "calls the play-by-play with accurate and often amusing commentary, though he does repeat himself a bit." In 1998, Saturn Power ranked the game 93rd in its Top 100 Sega Saturn Games.
