= Mission: Impossible (1998 video game) =

1998 video game

- European Nintendo 64 box art
- Developer: Infogrames
- Publishers: Ocean (N64); Infogrames (PS)
- Director: Benoit Arribart
- Producers: Arthur Houtman; Erwan Kergall
- Writers: Hubert Chardot; Andy Abrams
- Composer: Mike Pummell
- Platforms: Nintendo 64, PlayStation
- Release: Nintendo 64: NA: July 16, 1998; EU: September 25, 1998; PlayStation: EU: October 29, 1999; NA: November 22, 1999
- Genre: Action-adventure
- Mode: Single-player

Mission: Impossible is an action-adventure video game developed by Infogrames and loosely based on the 1996 film of the same name. It was originally released for the Nintendo 64 video game console in 1998. In the game, the player assumes the role of Ethan Hunt, an Impossible Missions Force (IMF) agent who must clear his name after a mole has infiltrated the IMF team. The game features 20 levels where the player must complete several mission objectives with the use of numerous high-tech gadgets.

Originally envisioned as an ambitious PC game by an Ocean team based in San Jose, California, Mission: Impossible was under development for three years and suffered a troublesome development cycle, partially due to an overestimation of what the Nintendo 64 could do. In 1997, after Infogrames bought Ocean, the company opted to put a new team based in Lyon in charge of its completion. Although the game features the same premise as the film, it is not meant to be a direct translation and has its own story.

Mission: Impossible was considered a commercial success and sold more than one million copies as of February 1999. The game received mixed reviews from critics and was frequently compared to Rare's 1997 game GoldenEye 007. Although its varied levels and objectives received some praise, the game was generally criticized for its inconsistent gameplay and slow controls. A port of the game, with lighting effects, voice acting, and other minor improvements, was released for the PlayStation console in 1999.

== Gameplay ==
Hunt holding the dartgun in the CIA Rooftop level. The player's health is displayed at the bottom of the screen.

Mission: Impossible is a single-player action-adventure game loosely based on the 1996 film of the same name, where the player controls Ethan Hunt from a third-person perspective through 20 levels. In each level, the player must complete a number of objectives that include collecting items, interacting with computers, setting explosives on targets, and neutralizing specific enemies. The game generally requires the player to exercise caution and restraint in carrying out these objectives. Outright use of violence is generally discouraged and it is easy to fail a level by accidentally shooting the wrong non-player character.

Many levels can be completed in a nonlinear order and require players to use numerous high-tech gadgets. For example, the Facemaker gadget disguises Hunt as another character, allowing the player to infiltrate restricted areas. Other notable gadgets like night vision glasses, smoke generators, and a fingerprint scanner are also featured. To neutralize enemies, the player can use a variety of weapons, including a silenced pistol, an Uzi submachine gun, a dartgun, an electroshock weapon, and a mini-rocket launcher. Combat takes place in real-time and the player is free to set on a manual aiming mode that uses an over the shoulder perspective. When the player is in aiming mode, Hunt becomes translucent and a crosshair is visible on the screen, allowing the player to shoot in any direction.

Three of the game's 20 levels are played in a special way. In one level, Hunt is attached to a cable and the player must help him go down while avoiding obstacles; in another level, the player assumes the role of a team member who must cover Hunt with a sniper rifle from a higher position; and in the last one, the player must control a cannon and destroy buildings while Hunt is on a gunboat. Hunt has a certain amount of health which decreases when attacked by enemies. If Hunt's health is fully depleted, the player must restart the corresponding level from the beginning. The game can be played in two difficulty modes: Possible (easy) and Impossible (hard). In the game's hard difficulty, Hunt is more vulnerable to enemy damage, enemies are more resilient, there are more objectives to complete in certain levels, and certain objectives are completed differently. The game supports the Nintendo 64 Rumble Pak.

== Plot ==
Jim Phelps, leader of the Impossible Missions Force (IMF), receives a message about a terrorist plot at an abandoned World War II submarine base in the 70th parallel north, where they plan to send missiles to a rival country. Phelps deploys IMF agents Ethan Hunt, John Clutter and Andrew Dowey to stop the terrorists' plans by infiltrating the base and destroying the submarine holding the missiles. While this is happening, Alexander Golystine, a worker at the Embassy of Russia in Prague, kidnaps IMF agent Candice Parker and steals one half of the CIA non-official cover (NOC) list, which holds the real and false names of all IMF agents. Although it is useless without the other half, the embassy possesses a powerful super-computer that may be capable of breaking the code to open the document. When IMF agent Robert Barnes goes missing after an attempted rescue mission, Phelps sends in Hunt to find and assemble the NOC list, rescue Candice Parker, and discover the fate of Barnes. After making his way through an underground warehouse and the KGB headquarters, Hunt finds Barnes dead in an office and saves Parker. Together, they recover the NOC list and escape using the cover of a fake fire.

Because the CIA suspects someone helped Hunt in Prague, he is taken to interrogation at the CIA headquarters in Langley, where he is accused of being a mole for a killer known as Max. With the help of Parker, Hunt escapes his captors and reaches the rooftop of the building. From there, he gains access to the IMF mainframe and steals the second half of the NOC list before escaping by helicopter. Hunt meets with the secretive Max in London Waterloo station, but she steals the NOC list and leaves her henchmen to execute him before boarding a train. With Parker's support and two former CIA agents, Hunt infiltrates the train and successfully neutralizes Max, taking back the NOC list. As he makes his way to the cargo area, he discovers that Phelps is the real mole. Hunt chases him onto the roof of the train and kills him, destroying his helicopter as he tries to escape. Afterwards, he returns to the CIA headquarters, where he is cleared of all suspicion. Now, as the IMF team leader, Hunt is informed that the terrorist group from the game's first mission has gone active again. With the help of Clutter and Dowey, Hunt stops their plans by destroying their base entirely. He then meets Parker and kisses her on top of a submarine before escaping.

== Development ==
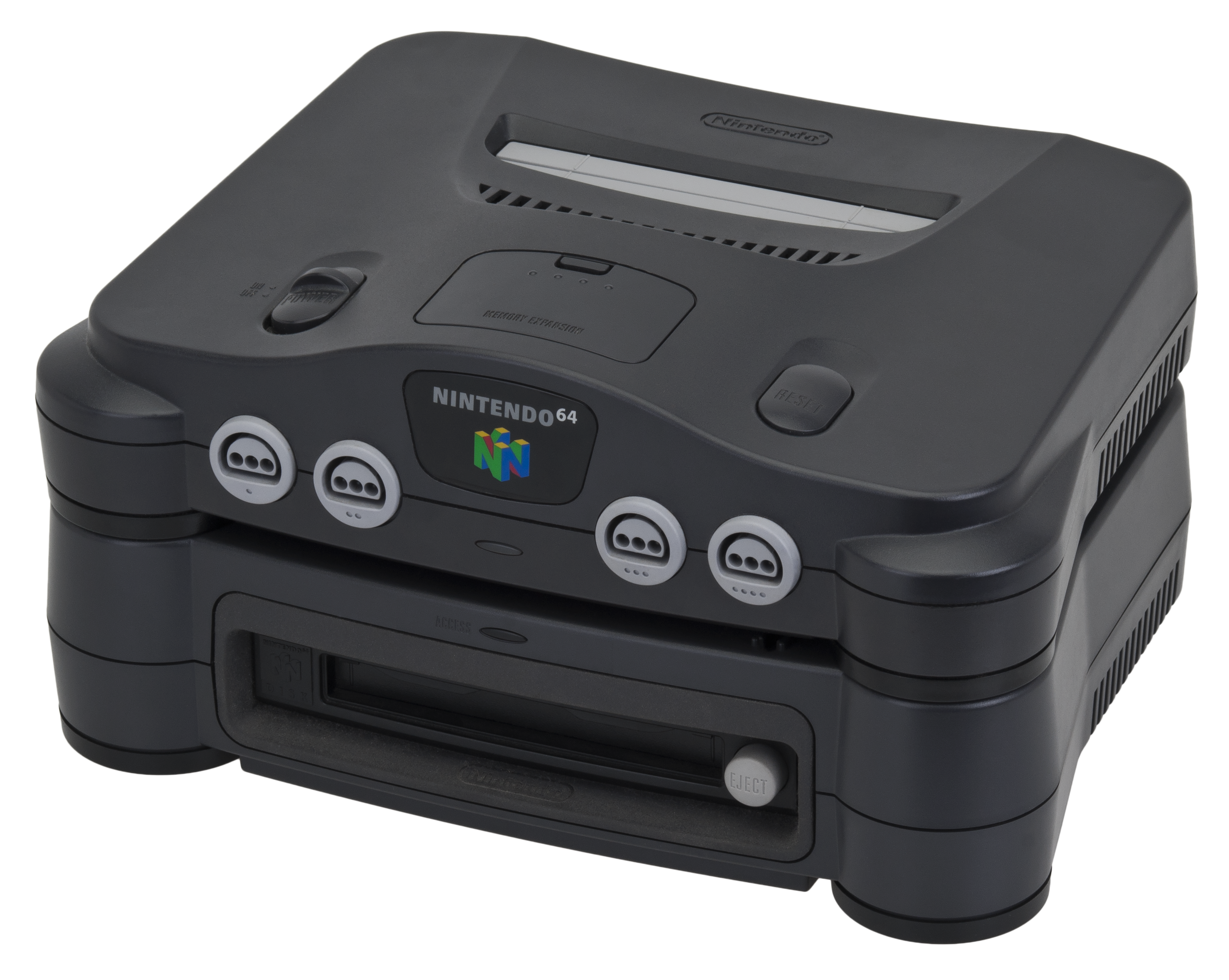
Developers originally intended to support Nintendo's 64DD floppy drive peripheral.

Mission: Impossible was announced in May 1996 as one of the first Nintendo 64 games, half a year before the console's launch. It was originally in development under a team from Ocean that was based in San Jose, California. Ocean, which was famous for creating numerous licensed video games, including successful games such as Batman and Jurassic Park, decided to create "a spy simulation" game that would be worthy of the Mission: Impossible film. Because the yet unreleased Nintendo 64 was a relatively unknown platform when production started, Mission: Impossible was initially envisioned as an ambitious PC game. Versions for the 32X, Mega Drive, Sega Saturn, and SNES were also planned. The 16-bit versions were reportedly similar to the 2D Flashback. Developer David Dixon, who previously worked on the Amiga version of the 1989 hit RoboCop, created the game's engine. An early version of the game featured character models that were assembled using up to 350 polygons. A new artificial intelligence, called SOOL, was also created, allowing computer-controlled characters to be governed by a complex set of prioritized instructions.

In San Jose, the development of Mission: Impossible was marred by an overestimation of what the Nintendo 64 could do, resulting in the game not materializing as intended. This, along with the fact that the developers refused to publish a substandard product, caused the game to be continually delayed. In late 1997, after acquiring Ocean, French video game company Infogrames put a new team in charge of the project. The new team was based in Lyon and was led by Benoit Arribart, who previously worked on the Saturn version of Alone in the Dark 2. When Infogrames took over production, the game was not in a playable state and only ran at 4 frames per second. As a result, the French team had to revise most of the American team's work and remodel the graphics in lower polygon count to improve the frame rate.

Nintendo's 1996 game Super Mario 64 and Rare's 1997 game GoldenEye 007 influenced the game's development. Developers had to differentiate the similarly themed Mission: Impossible and GoldenEye 007 as much as possible. A wristwatch interface was planned, but it was ultimately discarded after they saw it in GoldenEye 007. Originally, the player would be able to use the game's "swap" identity feature with any character in the game, but the idea was rejected because it required designers to plan every possible scenario. The game was originally intended to support Nintendo's 64DD floppy drive peripheral, which would allow players to access more levels. However, the plan was ultimately discarded because the developers did not have enough "time to really think about it".

Although the game features the same premise as the film, it is not meant to be a direct translation and has its own story. Viacom, the company that owns the rights of the film, forced the studio to limit the amount of violence and gunplay in the game, while actor Tom Cruise, who played Ethan Hunt in the film, did not want his face to be used in the game. The game's music and sound effects were created in MIDI format. A team in the United States helped the developers make the game sound as rich as possible. During the last months of development, the French team had to work between 16 and 20 hours a day, six days a week to fine-tune the game. The game's size is 12 MB. Overall, Mission: Impossible was developed over the course of three years. It was released in North America on July 16, 1998, and in Europe on September 25, 1998.

Mission: Impossible was ported by German developer X-Ample Architectures and released for the PlayStation console in Europe on October 29, 1999, and in North America on November 22, 1999. Unlike the Nintendo 64 version, the PlayStation version features FMV cutscenes, lighting effects, new music and sound effects, and voice acting for each character. Its release was accompanied by a US$2.5 million marketing campaign. A sequel for the Nintendo 64 was announced, but cancelled prior to release.

== Reception ==
Reception

Aggregate scores
| Aggregator | Score | |
| Aggregator | N64 | PS |
|---|---|---|
| GameRankings | 71% | 66% |
| Metacritic | 61/100 | N/A |

Review scores
| Publication | Score | |
| Publication | N64 | PS |
|---|---|---|
| AllGame | 3.5/5 | N/A |
| Computer and Video Games | 2/5 | N/A |
| Electronic Gaming Monthly | 5.75/10 | N/A |
| EP Daily | 6/10 | 6/10 |
| Game Informer | 8/10 | 8.25/10 |
| GameRevolution | B− | N/A |
| GameSpot | 6.6/10 | 4.4/10 |
| Hyper | 82/100 | 78/100 |
| IGN | 6.6/10 | 6.5/10 |
| N64 Magazine | 75% | N/A |
| Next Generation | 3/5 | N/A |
| Nintendo Power | 7.2/10 | N/A |

Mission: Impossible was considered a commercial success according to Infogrames chairman Bruno Bonnell; 1.13 million copies had been sold as of February 1999. In the US market, 550,000 copies had been sold as of October 1998. Mission: Impossible received generally mixed reviews from critics and was unfavorably compared to GoldenEye 007. Although some levels were praised for their variety and interesting objectives, the game was generally criticized for its inconsistent gameplay and slow controls. Next Generation explained that Mission: Impossible is not as polished as GoldenEye 007 because the game suffered from a difficult development cycle. Reviews of the PlayStation version noted minor improvements towards the graphics from the Nintendo 64 version, but was critical of the voice acting and its "poorly written" lines. Only Game Informer praised its inclusion for giving the game a more cinematic feel. In France, reviews were more positive, highlighting the game's blend of action with subtle gameplay.

Graphically, Mission: Impossible was criticized for its low frame rate, substantial distance fog, basic environments, and fuzzy graphical quality, especially when compared to GoldenEye 007. Critical reaction to the music and sound effects was usually mixed, with Peer Schneider of IGN remarking that the game sounds "a bit more muffled" and less believable than GoldenEye 007. However, the inclusion of "Theme from Mission: Impossible" and the game's fully-voiced cutscenes that describe certain missions were highlighted positively.

Several critics praised the gameplay for its gadgets variety and puzzle-solving elements. GamePro considered Mission: Impossible a smarter and more interactive game than other shooters of the time. The Facemaker gadget was seen as a fun item to use. Scott McCall of AllGame explained that it encourages players to play differently, stating that the enemies in the game will actually notice if players do something they are not supposed to do. The level where the player must cover Hunt with a sniper rifle was seen as an enjoyable addition to the game.

Criticism was targeted at the game's trial and error progression and unbalanced levels, with Tim Hsu of GameRevolution noting that it is sometimes difficult to know what to do in a given situation. Electronic Gaming Monthly acknowledged that Mission: Impossible has some interesting missions and locations, but ultimately concluded that most of the puzzles are tedious and that the game requires a lot of patience. The game's controls also frustrated critics. Tim Weaver, writing for N64 Magazine, said that the game has poor analog stick detection. He explained that Hunt "almost never walks because a touch in any direction just sends him scuttling into a full-paced sprint". Hyper's Cam Shea disliked the absence of moves such as crawling, strafing, a sidestep move outside of target mode, standing pressed against a wall, and sneaking. Other reviewers noted long delays when shooting enemies and that quick reactions are hampered by the game's low frame rate.
