= Fin Fin on Teo the Magic Planet =

1996 video game

- Developer: Fujitsu Interactive, Inc.
- Publishers: Fujitsu Interactive, Inc.
- Platform: Microsoft Windows
- Release: 1996
- Genre: Pet-raising simulation
- Mode: Single player

Fin Fin on Teo the Magic Planet (Note: Japanese: TEO-もうひとつの地球-, Hepburn: TEO - mō hitotsu no chikyū -) (stylized as fin fin: On TEO, the Magic Planet) is a 1996 computer game for Windows-based computers made by Fujitsu about a creature that is a hybrid of a bird and a dolphin which the user can communicate with via a microphone which came with the game, as well as with a webcam add-on called the SmartSensor. Fin Fin was produced by Makoto Tezuka.

Fin Fin responds to the player's volume and tone of voice. One reviewer described Fin Fin as a 'virtual mood ring'. 30,000 copies were sold in the first year in Japan.

Fin Fin is much like the popular Tamagotchi, but for a PC. If he is not fed or paid enough attention, he will sing a sad whistling song or sometimes fly away.

There are different versions of Fin Fin, each with a limited number of worlds available. There was a three-world version, a four-world version, a five-world version, and a six-world version (which has all the worlds).

Described as "experiential multimedia", it was reported that Fujitsu had invested "seven years of hardware and software research" in the general techniques of artificial life and "new graphics technology", the latter manifesting itself in this specific title through a claimed 40,000 polygons being used to animate Fin Fin at ten frames per second, with most screens in the game supposedly requiring one million polygons in their presentation. At the time, Fujitsu sought to broaden its business beyond hardware into multimedia software, reportedly making half of its $3.6 million research and development budget available to multimedia applications.

== Plot ==
The game's main goal is to win Fin Fin's friendship. There are many ways to communicate with Fin Fin. The first way is to press the 1 to 5 keys, which make a sound that attracts Fin Fin. The second way is to use a microphone and a whistle that come with the game, but if the player makes a loud sound or uses the whistle to scold Fin Fin, he will run away. In the 3, 4 and 5 world versions, the player can record their own voice using the Fin Fin sound recorder that comes with the game and a microphone. Their voice then plays back when they press the 6 to 0 keys.

There is also a separate sensor unit that informed Fin Fin whether the player was sitting in front of the screen. The sensor doesn't work in the German versions because of a faulty installation routine.

== Characters ==
Fin Fin - Fin Fin is the main character of the game. He is half dolphin and half bird. The player can watch him sing, fly, swim, play, 'talk' and interact with him in different ways in different locations.

Finnina - Fin Fin's wife. She can be seen in the Secret Inlet, Rem River Bank, and the Nest (which is only available in the six-world version).

Finfin Junior - Fin Fin's son. He can only be seen in the six-world version, at the Nest, when Finnina lays an egg and it hatches. He flies away from the Nest after a month.

Various flora and fauna - There are various animals and plants in the Planet Teo. Some plants only appear at night, and some only at day. Some animals are friendly to Fin Fin, while others want to eat him (but they never can).

== Weather ==
The game includes natural weather, from sunny days to cloudy days, rain or even thunderstorms. However, snowfall does not occur in the game because the areas in the game are close to the equator and so the temperatures are constantly in the warm to mild range. In addition to the weather, there are also annual events such as shooting stars and lunar eclipses, and natural weather phenomena such as rainbows or northern lights. Some could happen on a specific day (for example, on August 30, a double lunar eclipse would occur in the sky at a certain time) or on many days in a year.

== Places ==
There are six places to visit in the game. The three-world and four-world versions were released in Germany. The five-world version was only released in the US and the six-world version was exclusive to Japan and China.

=== Amile Forest ===
This place is available in all versions. It is quite high and there is a wide view over the surrounding forests to the "Ermes" mountain. In the foreground, there is a straightened branch. A "Yaika" tree, twisted in itself, with hanging leaves (similar to a willow or a birch), can be seen behind the branch. On the right, there are two palm-like trees.

The Amile Forest is Fin Fin's favorite place to be. Here he plays, eats and sleeps, and here one can observe him very well as he flies and practices his flying tricks, or sings. Here, the player can offer a "Lemo" berry by pressing the spacebar, which he accepts or rejects depending on whether or not he is hungry.

=== Lemo Valley ===
This place is available in the five-world version and above. Here grow the colorful "Lemo" fruit that Fin Fin often eats. The valley is surrounded by mountains, on which firs grow. The "Lemo" bushes, which always form new flowers and fruit, grow in the middle of the valley. In the foreground is a hill with many plants, musical flowers and two deciduous trees.

Fin Fin visits the valley to satisfy his hunger for fruit. Here one can observe the way he circles the bushes several times and looks for ripe fruit. If he finds one, he plucks it while hovering around the bush to eat afterwards. The player can also beat the neuro-drum by pressing the spacebar. If Fin Fin is not present, some plants start to play. After a while, animals appear at the concert. As soon as Fin Fin appears, the plants stop the music and the animals disappear one by one.

=== Tsubu Woods ===
This place is available in all versions. It is located on a small woodland, surrounded by tall trees. The trees look like coniferous trees, which bear golden-brown nuts, which can be seen sparkling in the wilderness on some nights. The shrubs, bushes and ferns on the clearing resemble jungle plants. On the floor of the clearing lies a hollow tree trunk and a large quantity of nuts or their shells.

Fin Fin visits the forest to satisfy his hunger for "Tsubu" nuts. Here one can observe him shaking the nuts from the trees by flying through the treetops. Then he eats the nuts lying on the ground.

=== Secret Inlet ===
This place is available in all versions. It is a small side course of the Remse river, which runs in the jungle. Here you can see two opposite broader banks, surrounded by dense banks. Between the plants are laubless trees, whose branches point in a different direction after each visit. There is a tree at the back with a hole in the trunk, forming a small cave.

Fin Fin comes to this bay to relax. Therefore, the player is recommended not to disturb him. However, the player can watch Fin Fin while swimming, playing and catching fish. If the player is lucky, Fin Fin's wife will also appear at this location for a brief moment.

=== Rem River Bank ===
This place is available in the four-world version and above. In the foreground is a cave inside the water. In the background of the upper part of the place, one can see the opposite plant-rich bank.

This place is the only one that shows the underwater world of Teo, and only here can the player watch Fin Fin diving and hunting for fish. Fin Fin's wife rarely comes to this place. If both are present, the player can watch the two doing a short underwater dance.

=== Nest ===
This place is only available in the six-world version. At the left part of the foreground is a bush of many different plants. In the center is the nest of Fin Fin and Finnina, which can be in one of three stages: construction, final or decayed. In the background is a narrow waterfall that ends in a small river. The place is surrounded by a forest of tall trees.

In this place, the player can observe the rearing of Finfin Junior by Fin Fin and his wife Finnina. By pressing the spacebar, a loud Fin Fin call will sound, which can cause various things. It is supposed to scare away an enemy named Gminfly (flying orca), if the latter has approached the nest too much. When the "call" is exercised, a certain plant is always frightened in the foreground, blooming in a jerky manner and changing its color. Over time, it calms down again and takes its old form. If the player presses it while Fin Fin is in the foreground, he will start to cry.

== Spinoffs ==
Animated Storybook: To Teo and Back with Jack is a short point-and-click game. In it, a man travels with a boy named Jack to the planet Teo to search for Fin Fin. Jack wants to bring Fin Fin back with him.

TanTan TEO was released in Japan and Korea. In the game, Fin Fin would like to participate in a music festival, but he must first improve his rhythm with the help of his friends. It is a music game in which the player controls Fin Fin with two keys and has to reach a certain amount of correct key combinations in the time limit in order to pass a level.

A follow-up game for the 64DD was announced in 1998, with plans to support the Voice Recognition Unit accessory, but was never released.

== See also ==
- Hey You, Pikachu!
- Seaman
