= Beetle Adventure Racing! =

1999 video game

- North American cover art featuring a Volkswagen New Beetle
- Developers: Paradigm Entertainment; EA Canada
- Publisher: Electronic Arts
- Producers: Jim Galis; Scott Blackwood
- Designers: Scott Blackwood; Scott Jackson
- Artists: Shawn Wright; Scott Jackson
- Composers: Phil Western; Scott Blackwood; Brenden Tennant
- Platform: Nintendo 64
- Release: NA: March 23, 1999; EU: September 4, 1999; AU: 1999
- Genre: Racing
- Modes: Single-player, multiplayer

Beetle Adventure Racing! is a racing game released for the Nintendo 64 in 1999. It was developed by Paradigm Entertainment and EA Canada, and published by Electronic Arts. Each vehicle in the game is a Volkswagen New Beetle, which was released the previous year. The gameplay involves racing other players on unlocked tracks, finding and destroying crates, and collecting colored ladybugs while battling other players. The single-player championship offers three circuits and a secret bonus circuit with new vehicles and tracks available upon completion.

In addition to its original release, the game was released in Australia as HSV Adventure Racing. This version replaced the Beetles with models from Holden Special Vehicles (HSV).

Beetle Adventure Racing received critical acclaim for its graphics, level design, car models, multiplayer mode, and scenery, though with criticisms being made on the limited selection of tracks and cars.

== Gameplay ==
The gameplay is similar to Electronic Arts' own Need for Speed series.

Beetle Adventure Racing supports up to four players. Two-player races can be held in any of the tracks, provided they have been unlocked in the single-player championship. Two to four players can also take part in the "Beetle Battle" mode, a vehicular combat mode in which players compete to collect six differently colored ladybugs (HSV pendants in HSV Adventure Racing), attempt to destroy the other competitors, and race for the exit once all the ladybugs are collected.

Single-player has two modes, Single Race and Championship. Single Race is single-player racing against computer-controlled vehicles on any stage that has been unlocked in the Championship mode. The championship is considered the main game, where players are given three circuits starting with Novice, Advanced, and Professional, with a fourth secret circuit, the Bonus Circuit, which is unlocked after completing all previous circuits.

Upon completing each circuit, new vehicles and tracks will be unlocked. Two special vehicles are unlocked by completing both Professional and Bonus circuits, the Alien Beetle and the Police Beetle respectively. The Alien Beetle's horn consists of the words, "We come in peace", spoken in an alien voice. The Police Beetle uses a siren, which causes all other computer racers to stop and pull over upon hearing it.

Four different types of crates are scattered along each track in Championship mode. Three of them are Point Crates, which give the player either 2, 5, or 10 bonus points when broken, and which are mostly found off track in shortcuts. The bonus points are used to earn "Continues" during each race, with between 50 and 70 points required to earn the Continue (dependent on difficulty). Finding all point crates, which add up to 100 in total, gives players a new Arena In Beetle Battle Mode.

Upon smashing through Nitro crates, the player is given a temporary boost of speed. These crates are usually found on hidden paths and beside the main roads.

The fourth type crate is a Cheat Crate, three of which are hidden on each stage. Smashing one, the player hears the word "Groovy!". Smashing a Cheat crate the first time unlocks the Cheat Menu, which allows the player to toggle unlocked cheat codes in both Two-Player Racing and Beetle Battle. The Cheat Menu has an Easter egg in which the faces of the game's developers are scattered on the background of the menu.

== Development ==
In the late 1990s, EA Canada partnered with Paradigm to work on an entry in the Need for Speed series for the Nintendo 64. Need for Speed 64 would have exclusive tracks and vehicles, Rumble Pak support and the series' trademark gameplay mechanics. The game was cancelled after Electronic Arts signed a deal with Volkswagen to make a game around the New Beetle, in addition to the designers looking for something else to distinguish it from other racers, thus altering the project into Beetle Adventure Racing!. In Australia, the game was renamed HSV Adventure Racing, replacing all the Beetles with local HSV models to carry over the successful strategy of Need for Speed including Australian car brands. A PlayStation port was planned, but cancelled due to technical issues.

The soundtrack features breakbeat consisting of drums, organs, and guitars. The music was composed by Phil Western, Scott Blackwood, and Brenden Tennant.

== Reception ==
Reception

Aggregate score
Aggregator	Score
Metacritic	90/100

Review scores
Publication	Score
AllGame	4.5/5
Computer and Video Games	3/5
Electronic Gaming Monthly	9.125/10
Famitsu	28/40
Game Informer	8/10
GameFan	(S.T.) 96% 86%
GamePro	5/5
GameSpot	8.5/10
Giant Bomb	5/5
Hyper	92%
IGN	9.1/10
Next Generation	4/5
Nintendo Life	9/10
Nintendo Power	8.5/10

Beetle Adventure Racing received "universal acclaim" according to the review aggregation website Metacritic. In Japan, where the game was ported and published by Electronic Arts Square on November 26, 1999, Famitsu gave it a score of 28 out of 40.

An unnamed reviewer of Next Generation commended the gameplay, graphics, cars and tracks, and considered the title to be a competitive rival to other racing franchises like Top Gear and EA's Need for Speed.

Victor Lucas of The Electric Playground called the scenery around the tracks "stunning", saying that the environments in the game feel "alive". Lucas noted some graphical errors and felt that the game should have utilized the system's Expansion Pak for higher resolution, but considered only a minor nuisance. He also said that the music and sound effects are "perfectly" suited to the gameplay. Lucas concluded that Beetle Adventure Racing is the first "truly addictive" Nintendo 64 game of 1999.

Peer Schneider of IGN heavily praised the game's graphics, sound effects, detailed racing tracks, vehicle handling, and multiplayer mode, but wrote that the game has a relatively limited number of tracks and cars, and that, unlike EA's Need For Speed, the game has a license which is limited only to Volkswagen models. He was also critical to the game's music that is limited to "generic" 'drum and bass' tracks. Schneider ultimately called the Beetle Adventure Racing as one of the best racing games for Nintendo 64.

Shawn Sackenheim of AllGame praised the game's lengthy racetracks, its multiplayer mode, its "superb" use of various shortcuts, car models, the graphics and its overall presentation. GameSpot claimed the game is a "great deal of fun".

=== Sales ===
Beetle Adventure Racing sold over 320,000 units in the United States. According to senior producer Hanno Lemke, its sales numbers were small relative to other EA products, which he blamed on its "terrible box art and a virtually non-existent marketing presence”, as well as high competition from other racing games on the Nintendo 64.

== Cancelled sequel ==
A sequel was in development in 2000, but has never been released. Lemke said it dropped the Beetle license and was titled Adventure Racing 2, featuring a variety of non-licensed vehicles and more customization, but was cancelled due to the first game's low sales.

== See also ==
- Beetle Crazy Cup
