= Hey You, Pikachu! =

Virtual pet video game for the Nintendo 64

- North American cover art, featuring Pikachu
- Developer: Ambrella
- Publisher: Nintendo
- Producer: Tsunekazu Ishihara
- Composer: Miki Obata
- Series: Pokémon
- Platform: Nintendo 64
- Release: JP: December 12, 1998; NA: November 6, 2000
- Genres: Virtual pet, Simulation
- Mode: Single-player

Hey You, Pikachu! (Note: Known in Japan as Pikachū Genki Dechū (Japanese: ピカチュウげんきでちゅう). It is a pun on "Pikachu genki desu", meaning "Pikachu is fine", and the suffix "-chu" from Pikachu's name. The pronunciation "dechū" for "desu" is also used in Japanese affected speech intended to sound childish and cute, including baby talk.) is a virtual pet video game developed by Ambrella and published by Nintendo for the Nintendo 64. A spin-off in the Pokémon franchise, it was released in Japan on December 12, 1998, and in North America on November 6, 2000. The player is asked to help Professor Oak test the PokéHelper, a device that lets humans communicate with Pokémon. The game is set in the Kanto region between Pewter City and Viridian City, where the player is introduced to a wild Pikachu. The player is able to communicate with a 256-word database through the Voice Recognition Unit (VRU), a Nintendo 64 hardware accessory that, when paired with a microphone, can comprehend and analyze human speech. Along with speaking with Pikachu, the VRU allows the player to move around and gather items.

Hey You, Pikachu! is one of only two games to utilize the VRU, with the other being Densha de Go! 64. The game had a mixed reception from critics. Though no direct sequels have been made, the virtual pet game Pokémon Channel, first released for the GameCube in 2003, resembles Hey You, Pikachu! and shares similar gameplay, with the exception of the microphone peripheral.

== Gameplay ==
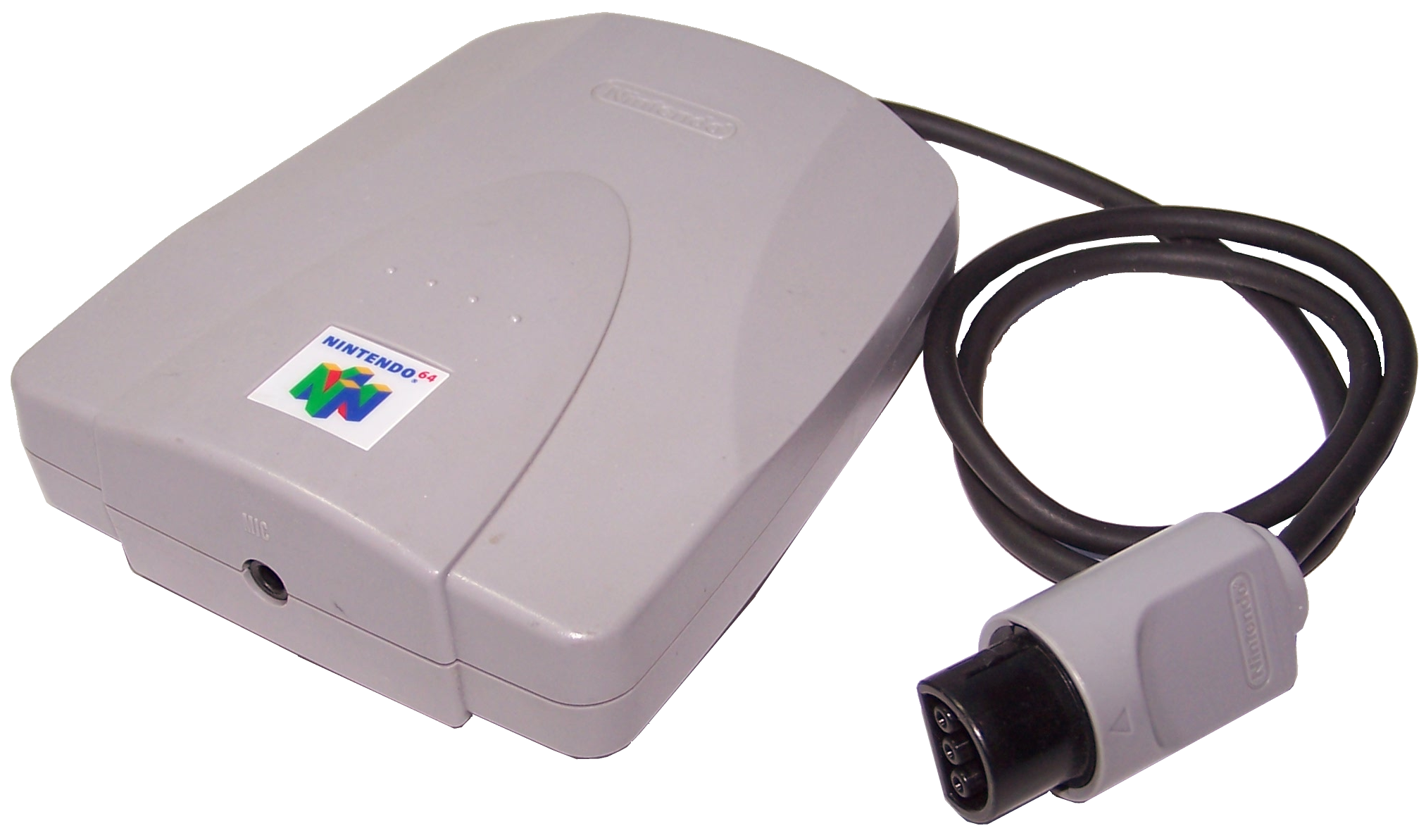
Pikachu, presenting a mushroom for the player to identify. The game requires the usage of the Nintendo 64 VRU peripheral in order to speak to Pikachu.

The main character is asked to test out the PokéHelper, a new device of Professor Oak's that is used to talk to Pokémon. The player then meets a wild Pikachu and befriends it. Once the player earns Pikachu's trust, it will come and live in the player's house. There are three different activity days: Pikachu's Daring Days, Discovery Days, and Play Days. Each day has a different objective (e.g. collecting food, going fishing) and the player can earn Pika Points, the currency used at Abra's Shop to unlock new items.

After 365 gameplay days, Professor Oak notifies the player that Pikachu, still a wild Pokémon, must be released. The player ventures to the woods to find Pikachu and repeatedly says "goodbye", upon which Pikachu realizes it must return to the wild. After the credits, while the player looks around the front yard and reminisces, Pikachu returns, and the game continues as if Pikachu was never released.

== Development ==
Hey You, Pikachu! was first demonstrated at Nintendo Space World '97. Originally, the game was to be titled Pikachu VRS in North America, but it was changed for marketability reasons.

== Reception ==
Reception

Aggregate score
| Aggregator | Score |
|---|---|
| Metacritic | 57/100 |

Review scores
| Publication | Score |
|---|---|
| AllGame | 3.5/5 |
| CNET Gamecenter | 5/10 |
| Electronic Gaming Monthly | 4.67/10 (Note: Three critics of Electronic Gaming Monthly gave the game each a score of 4.5/10, 3.5/10, and 6/10.) |
| EP Daily | 7.5/10 |
| Famitsu | 30/40 |
| Game Informer | 4/10 |
| GameFan | 84% |
| GameRevolution | D+ |
| GameSpot | 8.3/10 |
| IGN | 6/10 |
| N64 Magazine | (JP) 75% (US) 56% |
| Next Generation | 3/5 |
| Nintendo Power | 7/10 |
| X-Play | 2/5 |

Hey You, Pikachu! received "mixed" reviews according to the review aggregation website Metacritic. The Arizona Republic's Dustin Packwood commented that fans of the anime would enjoy this game. NextGen's Greg Orlando, however, said that the game "tastes just like chicken made of glucose." GamePro stated, "If you're a little kid or a big kid with a little kid's love for Pokémon, Hey, You, Pikachu is calling for you." (Note: GamePro gave the game two 3.5/5 scores for graphics and fun factor, and two 4/5 scores for sound and control.) In Japan, Famitsu gave it a score of 30 out of 40.

Retronauts cited the game as an example of a terrible Pokémon console game. UGO Networks listed the game on their list of the "Top 50 Games That Belong On the 3DS", stating "Using the 3DS' built-in microphone should make it simple to speak and interact with the wild Pokémon."

The game was nominated for the "Console Family" award at the Academy of Interactive Arts & Sciences' 4th Annual Interactive Achievement Awards; that award ultimately was given to Mario Tennis.

== Legacy ==
A spiritual sequel to Hey You, Pikachu!, Pokémon Channel, was first released on the GameCube in 2003 and was also developed by Ambrella. Another spiritual sequel, PokéPark Wii: Pikachu's Adventure, was first released on the Wii in 2009, which in turn had its direct sequel, PokéPark 2: Wonders Beyond, first released in 2011.

== See also ==
- Densha de Go! 64, the other game that uses the VRU.
- Fin Fin on Teo the Magic Planet
- Seaman (video game)
