= Pokémon Mini =

Handheld game console by Nintendo

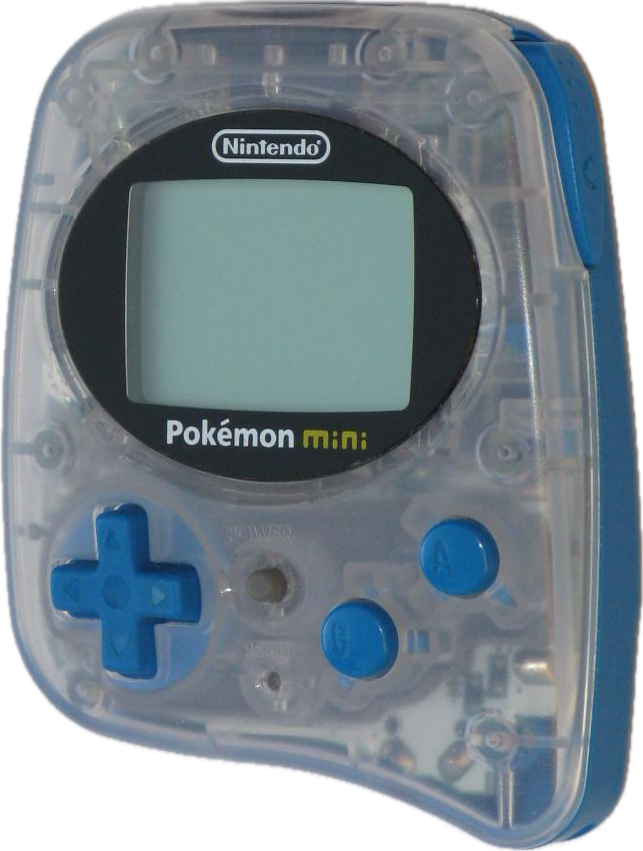
- Pokémon Mini in "Wooper blue"
- Manufacturer: Nintendo; The Pokémon Company
- Type: Handheld game console
- Generation: Sixth
- Released: NA: November 16, 2001; JP: December 14, 2001; EU: March 15, 2002
- Introductory price: US$40 (equivalent to $73 in 2025); ¥4,800 (equivalent to ¥5,389 in 2024); £40 (equivalent to £75 in 2025)
- Discontinued: 2002
- Media: ROM cartridge
- CPU: S1C88 @ 4 MHz
- Memory: 4 KB SRAM
- Storage: 4 KB BIOS ROM, 8 KB EEPROM (6 save "files")
- Display: Monochrome LCD, 96 × 64 px
- Power: 1 × AAA battery, up to 60 hours
- Dimensions: 74 × 58 × 23 mm (2.91 × 2.28 × 0.91 in)
- Weight: 70 g (2.5 oz) with cartridge and battery
- Related: Pokémon Pikachu

The Pokémon Mini (Note: Japanese: ポケモンミニ) (stylized as Pokémon mini) is a handheld game console designed and manufactured by Nintendo in Hardware collaboration with The Pokémon Company. It was originally released in North America on November 16, 2001; followed up with Japan the following month and Europe in March 2002. The system is themed around the Pokémon franchise, and is the smallest Nintendo system ever produced with interchangeable cartridges, weighing just under 70 grams (2.5 oz). Only 10 games were released for the system during its lifetime, with a small homebrew development scene forming in later years.

== Design and specifications ==
The Pokémon Mini features a monochrome dot-matrix display, a directional pad, three action buttons, a speaker, a real-time clock, an infrared data port for multiplayer gaming, a reed switch to detect when the device is shaken, and a motor for force feedback. The console was available in three color variants named after Pokémon characters: "Wooper Blue," "Chikorita Green," and "Smoochum Purple."

The device is powered by the 8-bit S1C88 CPU with 16-bit instructions, custom-designed by the Nintendo R&D3 team and manufactured by Epson. This processor, clocked at 4 MHz, manages game execution, user input, and graphical output.

The device features a monochrome dot-matrix display with a resolution of 96 × 64 pixels and a refresh rate of 30 frames per second. Unlike the Game Boy, it lacks the ability to display shades of grey and does not rely on a display driver. Instead, it uses a "Picture Rendering Controller" to transfer image data from memory to its internal framebuffer before outputting it to the screen.

Input is provided by a D-pad for movement, three action buttons labeled "A", "B", and the shoulder-mounted "C", a power button, and a reed switch called the "shock sensor" capable of detecting motion, allowing players to interact with certain games by shaking the device and allowed the device to function as a pedometer. The system includes a built-in rumble feature for haptic feedback. An infrared communication function capable of operating up to 1 meter (3 ft 3 in) away, enables multiplayer gaming between up to six Pokémon Mini devices. Game states can be saved to the 8 KB EEPROM, which provides six internal save files, though the number of files used per save varies by game.

Games are stored on Game Pak cartridges, which could have held up to 2 MB of game ROM, although all commercially available games are under 500 KB. Internally, the 4 KB BIOS ROM initializes the system and handles power management, as the console remains in a suspended state rather than fully powering off. The console includes 4 KB of internal static RAM, which is shared with video processing functions. A battery-backed real-time clock allows the device to function as a watch and enabled time-based features in games. Audio is produced by a single-channel square-wave generator with adjustable pulse width and three volume settings (0, 50, and 100 percent).

It is the smallest Nintendo system ever produced with interchangeable cartridges, measuring 74 millimeters (2.9 in) in height, 58 millimeters (2.3 in) in width, and 23 millimeters (0.91 in) in depth. With a cartridge and battery inserted, it weighs 70 grams (2.5 oz). Powered by a single AAA battery, Nintendo estimated a battery life of up to 60 hours of gameplay.

== Release and sales ==
The Pokémon Mini was first released in North America on November 16, 2001. The system was exclusively sold at Pokémon Center New York which opened on the same day. On November 19, it became nationally available as a launch item on the Pokémon Center website. it was Nintendo's least expensive console ever produced at US$45 (equivalent to $82 in 2025) and came bundled with the game Pokémon Party mini.

The system was later launched in Japan on December 14, 2001, and was sold at a specific lineup of retailers with a stand-alone version later being sold at a reduced price; and eventually in Europe on March 15, 2002.

Sales of the Pokémon Mini were poor, and only ten official games were produced, with five remaining exclusive to Japan, five released in Europe, and four in North America. In later years, hobbyists reverse-engineered the device, enabling homebrew development and emulation of official titles on other platforms.

== List of games ==
A total of ten games were officially released for the Pokémon Mini. While all were available in Japan, only four were released in North America and five in Europe. Due to low sales and limited interest in the system, later titles were not translated from Japanese. These titles would eventually receive fan translations. Games sold for US$10 (equivalent to $18 in 2025) in the United States and ¥1,200 (equivalent to ¥1,347 in 2024) in Japan.

Games were mostly developed by Denyusha or Jupiter Corporation and published by The Pokémon Company in Japan and by Nintendo in other regions.

Key
†	Game was bundled with Pokémon Mini console

Title	Genre	Developer	Release date		
Title	Genre	Developer	NA	JP	EU
Pokémon Party mini †	Mini games	Denyusha	November 15, 2001	December 14, 2001	March 15, 2002
Pokémon Pinball mini	Pinball	Jupiter	November 15, 2001	December 14, 2001	March 15, 2002
Pokémon Puzzle Collection	Puzzle	Jupiter	November 15, 2001	December 14, 2001	March 15, 2002
Pokémon Zany Cards	Card game	Denyusha	November 15, 2001	December 14, 2001	March 15, 2002
Pokémon Tetris	Puzzle	Nintendo	Unreleased	March 21, 2002	September 2002
Pokémon Puzzle Collection vol. 2	Puzzle	Jupiter	Unreleased	April 26, 2002	Unreleased
Pokémon Race mini	Platformer	Jupiter	Unreleased	July 19, 2002	Unreleased
Pichu Bros. mini	Mini games	Denyusha	Unreleased	August 9, 2002	Unreleased
Togepi's Great Adventure	Puzzle	Jupiter	Unreleased	October 18, 2002	Unreleased
Pokémon Breeder mini	Virtual pet	Jupiter	Unreleased	December 14, 2002	Unreleased

=== Pokémon Party mini ===
Pokémon Party mini (Note: Japanese: ポケモンパーティミニ, Hepburn: Pokemon Pāti mini) is a minigame collection developed by Denyusha. It includes six minigames which all take advantage of the system's capabilities and abilities:

- Hitmonchan's Boxing: As a Hitmonchan battling against a Machop in a boxing match, the player must shake the system to 'punch'.
- Pikachu's Rocket Start: As a Pikachu, the player must launch off a starting line before another Pokémon (A Rattata, Eevee and another Pikachu). Pikachu can run using the buttons or shaking the system. An Elekid gives the signals which is achieved through the system's rumble ability.
- Bellossom's Dance: A rhythm game. As a Bellossom playing against two other Bellossom, the player must match the right moves with the D-Pad, and shake the system to jump.
- Chansey's Dribble: A simple soccer dribbling game. As a Chansey, the player must use the D-pad to position the ball, and make sure Chansey kicks it into the finish line as quickly as possible.
- Slowking's Judge: As a Slowking, the player predicts if a tennis ball will land in or out of the court.
- Sneasel's Fakeout: A rock paper scissors-like game for two players. As two Sneasel, the players decide who is on defense and offense in a game of Basketball.

Additional modes include "Battlefield", where two to six players battle for the highest score in the aforementioned minigames, and "Celebi's Clock", a clock with date, alarm and stopwatch function.

=== Pokémon Pinball mini ===
A screenshot of Pokémon Pinball mini. The player must use the Diglett plunger, seen at the bottom, to bounce the Poké Ball into each of the open holes above.

Pokémon Pinball mini (Note: ポケモンピンボールミニ, Pokemon Pinbōru mini) is a pinball game developed by Jupiter. The player uses Pokémon such as a Diglett or a Pikachu as the 'bumping' mechanism. Along the way, players can catch more Pokémon for use, and other Pokémon can function as level obstacle elements. There are 70 "Quest" levels, and 10 levels each in Time Attack and Score Attack modes.

=== Pokémon Puzzle Collection ===
Pokémon Puzzle Collection (Note: ポケモンパズルコレクション, Pokemon Pazuru Korekushon) is a puzzle minigame collection developed by Jupiter. It features four different game types, which can unlock over 80 Pokémon in the game's "Minidex".

- Motion Puzzle: A sliding game where a moving image of a Pokémon has to be unscrambled by the player.
- Shadow Puzzle: The player must find different shapes and put them together to make an image of a Pokémon.
- Rescue Mission: A Pokémon is trapped, and the player must remove the blocks so they can access the rest of the maze.
- Power On: A Pipe Dream-like game where one has to connect a Pikachu to a light bulb, creating a circuit.

=== Pokémon Zany Cards ===
Pokémon Zany Cards (Note: ポケモンアニメカード大作戦, Pokemon Anime Kādo Daisakusen; lit. 'Pokémon Anime Card Great Strategy') is a card game compilation developed by Denyusha. It includes four playing card games featuring Pokémon-themed cards and characters from the Pokémon anime.

- Wild Match: The player battles against other characters from the Pokémon anime by making the most evolutionary matches, which at turn gives out coins, with the player who has the most coins winning.
- Special Seven: The player battling with other Pokémon anime characters must get rid of their hand of cards, which can be determined by suit or matching Pokémon.
- Card Duel: A two-player only game where the players must attempt to get each other's deck with the highest valued card.
- Four Kings: A single-player Solitaire-type game where cards must be stacked into a specific order, while Magikarp (which functions as the "King") must top the deck off.

=== Pokémon Tetris ===
Pokémon Tetris (Note: ポケモンショックテトリス, Pokemon Shokku Tetorisu; lit. 'Pokémon Shock Tetris') is a puzzle game developed by Nintendo. It plays like most versions of Tetris, but in addition to traditional piece rotation, shaking the system will cause falling pieces to flip horizontally. All of the Pokémon from Pokémon Gold and Silver can be "caught" and added to the in-game Pokédex, although rarer Pokémon can only be found on higher difficulty levels.

The game was not released in North America, but was rated by the ESRB under the title Pokémon Mini Shock Tetris, suggesting it was planned for release.

=== Pokémon Puzzle Collection Vol. 2 ===
Pokémon Puzzle Collection Vol. 2 (Note: ポケモンパズルコレクションVol.2, Pokemon Pazuru Korekushon Vol. 2) is a puzzle minigame collection developed by Jupiter, and is the sequel to Pokémon Puzzle Collection. In addition to the returning "Motion Puzzle" and "Shadow Puzzle" modes, two new modes have been added:

- Pick-Up Puzzle: The player clears Poké Balls on the field in a forward-only position, and can only move if Poké Balls are faced in the respective direction.
- Stretch Puzzle: The player, through a given number, must fill gaps in a grid by stretching bars.

The game was not released in Europe or North America, but was rated by the ESRB under the title Pokémon Mini Puzzle Collection Vol. 2, suggesting it was planned for release.

=== Pokémon Race mini ===
Pokémon Race mini (Note: ポケモンレースミニ, Pokemon Rēsu mini) is a platform racing game developed by Jupiter. Similar to the later-released Pokémon Dash, the player controls a Pikachu and races against other Pokémon including a Chikorita, Wooper, Pichu, and Sandshrew in a competition for the fastest Pokémon.

=== Pichu Bros. mini ===
Pichu Bros. mini (Note: ピチューブラザーズミニ, Pichū Burazāzu mini) is a minigame compilation developed by Denyusha, and is the sequel to Pokémon Party mini. It features six new minigames based on the Pichu Bros. specials:

- Skate Pichu: An endless runner game where as one of the Pichu Bros., the player must avoid obstacles by shaking the system.
- Magby's Hot-Air Balloon: As Magby, the player must land a hot-air balloon on an island without falling into the sea.
- Hoppip's Jump: The player must press the C button at the right time to make Hoppip jump.
- Teddiursa's Shaking Fruits: By shaking the system, the player must make Teddiursa eat a piece of fruit in the shortest amount of time.
- Smoochum's Angel Kiss: A whac-a-mole-type game where the player, as Smoochum, must attempt to kiss the Diglett that pop out of the holes by pressing the buttons at the right time.
- Cubone's Bone Club Fight: As Cubone, the player must shake the system to throw the bone and make sure it hits the target.

The "Battlefield" and "Clock" modes also return from the original.

=== Togepi's Great Adventure ===
Togepi's Great Adventure (Note: トゲピーのだいぼうけん, Togepī no Daibōken) is a top-down action puzzle game developed by Jupiter. The player guides Togepi out of maze-like levels in a tower while avoiding obstacles and other Pokémon. The game features over 200 levels spread across three towers.

=== Pokémon Breeder mini ===
Pokémon Breeder mini (Note: ポケモンそだてやさんミニ, Pokemon Sodateyasan mini) is a virtual pet game developed by Jupiter. The player is given an egg that hatches into a Treecko, Torchic or Mudkip. The player must keep the Pokémon happy by feeding it, playing with it, and using toys. Feeding the Pokémon with special Pokéblocks can improve its stats.

== Legacy ==
The 2003 GameCube game Pokémon Channel has an in-game Pokémon Mini that can be unlocked. Users can play emulated demo versions of some Pokémon Mini games, as well as an exclusive minigame, "Snorlax's Lunch Time." This official emulator was instrumental in helping a few hobbyist software engineers reverse engineer the handheld and create their own emulator. This allowed them to build new emulators to run the games on other devices, such as the PC, Dreamcast, Nintendo 3DS, and Analogue Pocket, among others. These efforts let hobbyists create homebrew games and tech demos. One of these demos, SHizZLE, was released at Breakpoint in 2005 and caused some excitement within the demoscene and media by showing off advanced graphics rendering techniques.
