= Wooper =

Pokémon species

- Pokémon character
- Wooper artwork by Ken Sugimori
- First game: Pokémon Gold and Silver (1999)
- Designed by: Ken Sugimori (finalized)

In-universe information
- Species: Pokémon
- Type: Water and Ground; Poison and Ground (Paldean)

Wooper (/ˈwuːpər/), known in Japan as Upah (Japanese: ウパー, Hepburn: Upā), is a Pokémon species in Nintendo and Game Freak's Pokémon media franchise. First introduced in Pokémon Gold and Silver, it was conceived by Game Freak's development team, with the design finalized by Ken Sugimori. Since Wooper's debut, it has appeared in multiple sequels and games related to the series including Pokémon Go, the Pokémon Trading Card Game, and has also appeared in various pieces of merchandise.

Classified as a Water and Ground-type Pokémon, Wooper is a creature resembling an axolotl, featuring blue skin, external gills, and an oval shaped tail. It eventually evolves into the Pokémon Quagsire. A beta version of Wooper was discovered in a leak of Pokémon Gold and Silver, showing a design that is chubbier and walks on four legs. In Pokémon Scarlet and Violet, a new variant was added called Paldean Wooper. It has black/brown skin and bones protruding from its head, and its typing is Poison and Ground. Instead of Quagsire, this variant's final form is Clodsire.

Wooper has received a generally positive reception for both of its forms, and the original form is considered a cute, funny and an iconic design. The Paldean Wooper form also received praise for its design, and the beta design of Wooper was also well-received upon leaking, with some preferring it to the final design.

== Concept and creation ==
Wooper is a species of fictional creatures called Pokémon created for the Pokémon media franchise. Developed by Game Freak and published by Nintendo, the Japanese franchise began in 1996, with the video games Pokémon Red and Green for the Game Boy, which were later released in North America as Pokémon Red and Blue in 1998. In these games and their sequels, the player assumes the role of a Trainer whose goal is to capture and use the creatures' special abilities to combat other Pokémon. Some Pokémon can transform into stronger species through a process called evolution via various means, such as exposure to specific items. Each Pokémon has one or two elemental types, which define its advantages and disadvantages when battling other Pokémon. A major goal in each game is to complete the Pokédex, a comprehensive Pokémon encyclopedia, by capturing, evolving, and trading with other Trainers to obtain individuals from all Pokémon species.

Wooper was first introduced in Pokémon Gold and Silver. When developing the games, around 300 individual Pokémon designs were drafted by various members of the development team, with each deciding their names and features, revising the drafts as needed. During this process the team actively tried to avoid vague design concepts, as they felt this had caused difficulty in creating completed Pokémon during Red and Blue development. As the team selected which Pokémon would be included, they were drawn and finalized by lead artist Ken Sugimori. To maintain balance, many of the newer species did not appear in the early stages of the game. Additionally, many of the Pokémon were designed with merchandise in mind, taking into account the related Pokémon toy line and anime series. As a result, designs often had to be kept simplistic, something that caused strain for Sugimori and affected his approach to the next subsequent Pokémon franchise titles, Pokémon Ruby and Sapphire.

Wooper is a blue Water and Ground-type Pokémon that resembles an axolotl with two legs and no arms. It also has a flat tail, external gills, three curved lines on its stomach, and gills protruding from its head. In the beta release of Gold and Silver, it has a chubbier design and walks on all fours. Its name comes from the term "wooper looper," a term coined in Japanese for pet axolotls. A feature introduced in Pokémon Diamond and Pearl saw certain Pokémon, including Wooper, given gender differences. Female Wooper have shorter gills. Another design was later introduced, dubbed Paldean Wooper. Unlike regular Wooper, it has a Poison and Ground typing, brown skin, the pattern on its stomach resembles a rib cage, and its gills make its head resemble a skull and crossbones. The original Wooper evolves into Quagsire, while Paldean Wooper evolves into Clodsire.

== Appearances ==
First featured as one of one hundred new Pokémon added to Gold and Silver, Wooper has appeared in many subsequent releases in the Pokémon series. It is a Water and Ground-type Pokémon, and this form evolves into Quagsire, which retains this type combination. In the base release of Pokémon Scarlet and Violet, Wooper does not appear outside of an in-game trade, and a regional Paldean variant appears instead. This form retains the Ground typing, but is Poison type instead of Water. Instead of evolving into Quagsire, this Pokémon evolves into Clodsire. Regular Wooper became readily available in a downloadable content expansion for Scarlet and Violet. Both forms of Wooper appear in Pokémon Go and the Pokémon Trading Card Game. A Pokémon mini themed after Wooper was also released.

Wooper has appeared in various spin-off video games. It appears in multiple entries in the Pokémon Mystery Dungeon series, including Pokémon Mystery Dungeon: Explorers of Sky and Pokémon Mystery Dungeon: Gates to Infinity, the latter which features it as one of a handful of Pokémon available that were not from the fifth generation of Pokémon species. It appears in Pokémon Mystery Dungeon: Adventure Team for WiiWare as a starter Pokémon in the Storm Adventure Squad version. A short animation was released by Studio Colorido that focuses on a Wooper-obsessed girl who wanted to see Woopers in the wild. Multiple Wooper appear in the Pokémon Concierge animated series.

Both forms of Wooper have received multiple pieces of merchandise, including stuffed animals, figurines, apparel, and jewelry. A large yawning Clodsire plush was also released, with buyers able to choose one that comes with two, five, or thirty Paldean Wooper.

== Reception ==
Paldean Wooper, nicknamed "Pooper" by fans, was positively received

Wooper is generally positively received, noted as a historically beloved Pokémon and the subject of frequent memes by IGN writer Rebekah Valentine. Inside Gamer writer Benjamin Ben considered Wooper among the best designs added to Pokémon Gold and Silver, praising its ability to make people happy with its simple smile. He also felt that its axolotl inspiration helped contribute to that. Following the leak of unused Pokémon in Pokémon Gold and Silver, Wooper's beta design became a particularly popular one, identified by Polygon writer Patricia Hernandez as the most popular who stated that some fans prefer the beta Wooper to the final design. Hernandez praised it for its cuteness and short stature, being unsurprised by its popularity and noting the large amount of fan art. HobbyConsolas writer Javier Escribano noted that, due to its chubbier design compared to Wooper, it has become a meme.

Wooper is so popular that fan pages have been created for it; for example, a Wooper fan page on Facebook has garnered over 10,000 followers and counting.

Upon being revealed in Pokémon Scarlet and Violet, Paldean Wooper became a popular Pokémon among fans, being given the nickname of "Pooper". Polygon writer Cass Marshall thought that Wooper was "always cute" due to its "silly expression." Game Rant writer Benjamin Jones suggested that its reveal was among the best at the time, noting how it being a Ground/Poison-type Pokémon was a notable change, arguing that the type combination was a powerful one, especially in combination with its ability, Water Absorb. GamesRadar+ writer Hope Bellingham also noted its Poison/Ground typing as a notable one, noting how it's the first time since Pokémon Red and Blue to have the type. They described it as a cute Pokémon, though noted that its type combination and abilities Poison Point and Water Absorb showed potential. Vice writer Renata Price noted that Wooper was a favorite Pokémon of theirs, appreciating that it got a new form that they made it a "dirty, grimy boy." Famitsu writer Count Tsukune appreciated the reveal, saying it was the cutest of the Pokémon revealed at the time, both in its game model and art. They stated that they decided to buy Scarlet and Violet after seeing Paldean Wooper. Despite the positive reception for Paldean Wooper, Fanbyte writer Imran Khan was critical of it, arguing that it was an example of a less inspired regional variant. He felt that Paldean Wooper was a less interesting idea for a Ground/Poison-type Pokémon than they could have done.

Critics have discussed the influences behind both Wooper and its Paldean form. Author Jean-Bruno Renard, while discussing fictional representations of axolotls, discussed Wooper, noting its various design and conceptual inspirations, citing its external gills and flat tail. While multiple authors noted that Wooper is based on an axolotl, GamesRadar+ writer Hope Bellingham argued that the Paldean form is based on the iberian ribbed newt. They argued that multiple design choices correlate between the two, including their brown skin, rib-like pattern, and their use of poison as a defense mechanism.
