= Bochi =

Bochi may refer to:

- Bochi (Pokémon), a character from generation IX of Pokémon games
- Bochi (deity), a deity in Georgian mythology
