= Chandelure =

Pokémon species

- Pokémon character
- Chandelure artwork by Ken Sugimori
- First game: Pokémon Black and White (2010)
- Designed by: Ken Sugimori
- Voiced by: EN: Faye Mata (Detective Pikachu game); JP: Misato Fukuen

In-universe information
- Species: Pokémon
- Type: Ghost and Fire

Chandelure (/ʃændəˈlʊər/), known in Japan as Chandela (シャンデラ), is a Pokémon species in Nintendo and Game Freak's Pokémon media franchise. Designed by Ken Sugimori, they were introduced in the video games Pokémon Black and White. Chandelure is the evolved form of Lampent and the final evolution of Litwick. Since their initial appearance, they have appeared in multiple games including Pokkén Tournament and Pokémon Unite.

Classified as both a Ghost and Fire-type Pokémon, Chandelure typically gives off the appearance of a ghostly chandelier with large, round eyes, a stitched mouth, purple flames, and swingable arms. Their rarer "shiny" form has orange instead of purple flames, that make it like a real chandelier, which the Pokémon is based on. In-game entries suggest that Chandelure is capable of using their flames to hypnotize and/or burn the spirits of opponents, cursing them to wander aimlessly.

The overall reception of Chandelure is mixed despite being considered a "fan-favorite" Pokémon. Critics state that the Litwick family line is uncreative because they take the form of inanimate objects, using criticisms also applied to other "object-based" Pokémon like Klefki. Supporters argue that Chandelure is amongst the most popular Pokémon, citing that its design is not comparable to other object Pokémon. Many of them consider it to be powerful gameplay-wise and praise its "cute" exterior and creepiness factor based on in-game entries of it. Its reveal in Pokkén Tournament as a playable character came as a surprise to many fans, but upon release of the game, it received positive receptions for its in-game potential despite not taking a traditional humanoid form typical of fighting games.

== Conception and design ==
Chandelure is a species of fictional creatures called Pokémon created for the Pokémon media franchise. Developed by Game Freak and published by Nintendo, the Japanese franchise began in 1996 with the video games Pokémon Red and Green for the Game Boy, which were later released in North America as Pokémon Red and Blue in 1998. In these games and their sequels, the player assumes the role of a Trainer whose goal is to capture and use the creatures' special abilities to combat other Pokémon. Some Pokémon can transform into stronger species through a process called evolution via various means, such as exposure to specific items. Each Pokémon has one or two elemental types, which define its advantages and disadvantages when battling other Pokémon. A major goal in each game is to complete the Pokédex, a comprehensive Pokémon encyclopedia, by capturing, evolving, and trading with other Trainers to obtain individuals from all Pokémon species.

Known in Japanese as "Chandela", Chandelure is the final stage of the Ghost and Fire-type Litwick family line, of which Chandelure evolves from the middle stage lamp Pokémon Lampent. Whereas Litwick evolves into Lampent after gaining enough experience, the latter evolves into Chandelure through use of the "Dusk Stone" item. As a Ghost and Fire-type Pokémon measuring 3 feet 3 inches (99 cm) tall, its form is of a ghostly chandelier with large, round eyes and a stitched mouth. The flames present in Chandelure are normally purple-colored, consistent with what is observed in that of Litwick. Rarer "shiny" forms of Chandelure have orange flames, which differ from the teal flame of the first-stage Litwick and the pink flame of the middle stage Lampent. The species also has swingable arms with flames, which it can use to hypnotize its opponents. Pokédex entries of the Litwick family suggest capabilities of soul consumption of their victims, with Chandelure burning their souls and cursing them to become restless. Chandelure received a Mega Evolution in Pokémon Legends: Z-A, with it taking on the appearance of a larger, more elaborate chandelier.

Chandelure was introduced in Pokémon Black and White, titles produced for the Nintendo DS. In contrast to previous entries, director Junichi Masuda wanted to "play up the coolness" of Pokémon introduced in the title, and to that end the designs gravitated more towards using angular and sharp lines instead of rounded ones. In an interview with Nintendo Power, Masuda additionally noted that improvements in gaming hardware had also impacted their approach compared to previous entries, as it allowed for more detailed designs. According to the concept artist Ken Sugimori, the Litwick family originally started off as a flame-candle-lamp evolutionary chain. He disliked the original idea and later remade the candle form as the first stage Pokémon Litwick. One possible hint at the origin of Chandelure is from a chandelier within the Game Freak company's office space at Carrot Tower, which Junichi Masuda did not directly disprove as being a possible inspiration. Chandelure's concept may have also derived from tsukumogami, or mythical spirits in Japanese folklore that possess tools. In the 2025 game Pokémon Legends: Z-A, Chandelure gains a "Mega Evolution", a temporary powered up form that can be used in battle. This form adds another set of candles to the chandelier body, as well as a crown-like headpiece.

== Appearances ==
Chandelure made its debut in the Pokémon Black and White mainline games, reappearing in subsequent mainline titles. For the Pokémon Scarlet and Violet games, it is only available via The Teal Mask DLC. It appears in the 2025 game Pokémon Legends: Z-A, where it gains the ability to Mega Evolve. It has also appeared in the trading card game, most notably in the Halloween-themed "Trick or Trade Booster Packs" in 2022 and 2023. Chandelure is available in Pokémon Go, Pokkén Tournament, and Pokémon Unite. The Pokkén Tournament director Haruki Suzaki explained his inclusion of Chandelure as a playable character as wanting a morphologically diverse roster. It also appears in Super Smash Bros. for Nintendo 3DS and Super Smash Bros. Ultimate, appearing as a trophy in the former and as a "Spirit" in the latter.

Outside of the games, Chandelure also made an appearance in several Pokémon anime episodes of the Pokémon the Series: Black & White season, its debut occurring in the episode "Battle for the Underground!" as a Pokémon belonging to the character Ingo. Misato Fukuen is credited for voicing Ingo's Chandelure in the Pokémon anime series in Japanese while the English dub voice actor is unconfirmed. It was also one of the featured Ghost-type Pokémon in the music video for the song "Ghost Dive" as performed by the Japanese rock band Polkadot Stingray.

== Promotion and reception ==
Chandelure has officially been featured in several forms of merchandise, although they are primarily intended for Japanese markets. The Pokémon has been included as figurines, plush toys, and cards for the Pokémon Trading Card Game. Motifs of Chandelure have been used in the 2013 merchandise set that includes lacquers, lamps, and accessory stands. As part of the official "Pokémon Fairy Tale" merchandise set in 2022, Chandelure is also featured as an LED light that has an iron base and is said to be usable as a reading light.

Overall opinions of Chandelure have varied from highly negative to highly positive mainly on the bases of its design as an "object" Pokémon and its gameplay attributes. The design and naming conventions of the species have been criticized by writers of several publications, especially in earlier years. For instance, Kyle Hilliard, writing for Game Informer, expressed his confusion that the Litwick line is recognized as a legitimate Pokémon line, that he felt that they better fit the Harry Potter franchise. Digital Spy author Sam Loveridge similarly expressed his dislike for the ghost Pokémon line due to them being "horror cliches". Brittany Vincent of GamesRadar+ also criticized the design of Chandelure, and though she acknowledged the lore of the Pokémon, she still considered it to be just a furniture piece. TheGamer writer Johnny Garcia acknowledged criticisms of Chandelure's design but instead expressed disapproval at it due to its apparent in-game frailness.

Chandelure has also been met with positive receptions. While Destructoid co-writer Wes Tacos criticized "object-based" designs, he reacted positively to Chandelure, citing that he found its "dumb and silly design" as a chandelier to be amusing. Chandelure was repeatedly reported by gaming site journalists as being a popular Pokémon in terms of both gameplay and design to the point where it is considered a "fan-favorite". In a 2020 poll by The Pokémon Company, Chandelure was selected as being the best Pokémon from the Pokémon Black and White games. In a 2023 Japanese poll with over 150,000 votes, Chandelure placed third in the popular Pokémon ranking, which TheGamer writer Joshua Robertson stated was a surprising result. Nicholas Fujii, writing for Comic Book Resources, praised Chandelure's design, citing that its association with chandeliers and haunted houses helped make the design feel more natural than other "object Pokémon" such as Klefki. The coloring schemes of the shiny variant of Chandelure in comparison received varied reactions, as some writers praised the orange colors of its flames while some others criticized it for being "boring" compared to the regular variant's coloring. Kevin Slackie and Moises Taveras of the magazine Paste expressed praise for the Pokédex entries of Chandelure consuming and cursing souls, citing it as an instance of ghost Pokémon "never disappoint[ing]" in the creepiness factor. Giovanni Colantonio of Polygon, stating that Chandelure was always one of his favorite Pokémon, similarly praised the Pokédex entry of Mega Chandelure in Pokémon Legends: Z-A for its spookiness and the designs of both Chandelure for its "visually pleasing purple and black design" and its Mega Evolution for its "even more extravagant lighting fixture".

Adam Snavely, writing for DotEsports, also highlighted the design, citing it as being the "rare" cute and friendly-looking object-based Pokémon with a logical evolutionary line and strong in-game stats. He considered the Litwick family to be the "Ghost Starter [line] that we never got." Eric Switzer, writing for TheGamer, heavily praised its design, stating that despite disliking Chandelure at first due to his inherent bias against object Pokémon to the extent that he failed to understand why his nephew considered it his favorite Pokémon over other popular choices, he grew to love it due to its personality and lore, most notably shown off via its appearance in Pokémon UNITE. Donald Theriault of Nintendo World Report expressed that Chandelure is his favorite Pokémon due to how powerful it is in the mainline games as well as its ominous-looking design. He anticipated the release of Pokkén Tournament so that he could play as the chandelier Pokémon. Many other fans expressed surprise at the reveal of Chandelure for Pokkén Tournament, given that its inclusion is subversive to typical humanoid forms of playable fighting game characters. Kotaku reviewer Mike Fahey posed curiosity regarding why Chandelure was picked over other popular Pokémon but considered it to be amongst the playable characters with superb gameplay qualities for Pokkén Tournament. Similarly, Ryan Bates of GameRevolution praised it for its in-game ranged and aerial capabilities, noting that he did not initially expect to have "started [his] love affair with Chandelure" going into the game. VentureBeat writer Willie Clark praised Chandelure's inclusion in Pokkén Tournament, highlighting that it, as an untraditional fighting game character, helped define the game's essence, capturing the "wild and crazy fun" spirit of the Pokkén world.
