= Tinkaton =

Pokémon species

- Pokémon character
- Tinkaton artwork by Ken Sugimori
- First game: Pokémon Scarlet and Violet (2022)
- Designed by: Megumi Mizutani
- Voiced by: Megumi Hayashibara

In-universe information
- Species: Pokémon
- Gender: Female-only
- Type: Fairy and Steel

Tinkaton (/ˈtiːŋkətʌn/), known in Japan as Dekanuchan (Japanese: デカヌチャン), is a Pokémon species in Nintendo and Game Freak's Pokémon franchise. A female-only species, Tinkaton is the evolved form of Tinkatuff and the final evolution of Tinkatink, all three designed by artist Megumi Mizutani at the request of Game Freak for the video games Pokémon Scarlet and Violet. Since Tinkaton's introduction, they have since appeared in other media and titles related to the Pokémon franchise, such as the Pokémon Trading Card Game and Pokémon Unite.

Classified as both a Fairy and Steel-type Pokémon, Tinkaton appears as a short pink creature with long light pink hair and a massive makeshift hammer it builds from scrap metal. Highly intelligent and daring, it steals items to bring back to its lair while using their hammer to launch projectiles, usually rocks, at their natural prey, the Flying and Steel-type Pokémon, Corviknight. As a result of this behavior, Corviknight is unable to provide taxi service for humans within the Paldea region where Tinkaton is native.

Since its introduction, Tinkaton has been positively received. In part, this is due to its design, which has been compared to character design tropes found in Japanese roleplaying games, but also to fictional races such as gnomes.

== Design and appearances ==
Tinkaton is a species of fictional creatures called Pokémon created for the Pokémon media franchise. Developed by Game Freak and published by Nintendo, the Japanese franchise began in 1996 with the video games Pokémon Red and Green for the Game Boy, which were later released in North America as Pokémon Red and Blue in 1998. In these games and their sequels, the player assumes the role of a Trainer whose goal is to capture and use the creatures' special abilities to combat other Pokémon. Some Pokémon can transform into stronger species through a process called evolution via various means, such as exposure to specific items. Each Pokémon has one or two elemental types, which define its advantages and disadvantages when battling other Pokémon. A major goal in each game is to complete the Pokédex, a comprehensive Pokémon encyclopedia, by capturing, evolving, and trading with other Trainers to obtain individuals from all Pokémon species.

Introduced in the 2022 video games Pokémon Scarlet and Violet and known in Japan as Dekanuchan, Tinkaton stands 2 feet 4 inches (70 cm) tall and is the third and final part of an evolution line designed by artist Megumi Mizutani at the request of Game Freak. A female-only species classified as both a Fairy and Steel-type, Tinkaton starts life as Tinkatink (カヌチャン, Kanuchan), a small Pokémon with a pink body, short light-pink hair extending from their scalp, silver eyes, a singular square shape tooth extending from their lower lip, and a metallic diamond on their chest. As metallurgists, they craft small rattle-like hammers from scraps of metal for protection, though these hammers are routinely stolen by other Pokémon species. After acquiring enough experience points, they evolve into Tinkatuff (ナカヌチャン, Nakanuchan), now slightly taller with a ponytail extending from their scalp, a second tooth also jutting from their upper lip and the diamond turned into a partial skirt over each thigh. The hammer has also grown in size from metal scraps gained from attacking other Steel-type Pokémon, and they test the effectiveness of their hammers by battling each other.

After evolving into Tinkaton, their hair is now let down and extends the length of their bodies, while a bow made of hair adorns the tops of their heads. In addition, their rearranged teeth now overlap their lower lip when they close their mouths, and their arms are now fully covered in light pink saved for their thumbs, with the hands ending in four short fingers. The hammer has also grown dramatically in size, which they wield with ease due to a metaphysical link to them despite the weapon's weight. In the game's lore, they have a daring disposition and are regarded as highly intelligent, stealing whatever catches their eye and bringing it back to their lair. They also use their massive hammers to launch stones at the flying Pokémon Corviknight. Tinkaton has been cited as Corviknight's Natural Predator due to being mentioned in Corviknight's Scarlet and Violet Pokédex entries that explain why the latter do not offer a taxi service to players in those titles like they did in the previous games. Tinkaton additionally gain an attack unique to them, "Gigaton Hammer", which is extremely strong but cannot be used twice in short duration under normal circumstances.

Tinkaton later appeared in Pokémon Unite during the game's anniversary event, featured in a new game mode called Panic Parade in which players must work together to protect it from a horde of attacking Pokémon. Cards featuring the species along with their evolution line have also appeared in the Pokémon Trading Card Game, with a deck that revolves around Tinkaton, and a special promotional card released to GameStop and Best Buy in 2023. Tinkaton and the rest of its evolution line were added to Pokémon Legends: Z-A in a post-launch update coinciding with the release of the Mega Dimensions downloadable content.

== Critical reception ==
Media outlets praised the character development from Tinkaton's evolution line, and their communal aspects

Tinkaton was positively received since their introduction. In a poll ran by Japanese website GameWith of the most popular Pokémon in Scarlet and Violet, they placed first, with publications voicing support of the results. Ryan Woodrow of USA Today described Tinkaton as a great representation of their typing, especially in light of the species' earlier evolutions, but also noted the while the design of a "small girl wielding a massive weapon" was a trope in Japanese roleplaying games, "it clearly works, because it makes Tinkaton a very endearing character." Dot eSports writer Yash Nair described the species as a "home run" concept-wise, further describing them as "probably one of the best concepts to come out of Pokémon Scarlet and Violet as a whole" in part due to their similarities between folklore of gnomes and dwarves, but also the strength and accuracy with which they used their massive hammers in light of their short stature.

The reaction to Tinkaton from players themselves was also positive, with the term Tinkaton becoming trending on the social media website Twitter. TheGamer's Joshua Robertson attributed this to the character's "seemingly innocent appearance, even though [...] it chooses chaos on a regular basis", additionally noting their perception as "an absolute menace to society" due to their role as Corviknight's natural predator within the game's setting. Kotaku's Sisi Jiang further elaborated on this, citing that fans "love the bloodthirsty aspect of Tinkaton's personality" through a variety of memes. However he noted that fans had also embraced the character as an underdog, due to Pokédex entries for their earlier form, Tinkatink, describing them as the victim of bullying by other Pokémon and stated "maybe it's fine that Tinkaton is ecologically inclined to bully Corviknight for fun. After all the effort it's put towards improving its hammer, it's earned it." Kevin Slackie and Moises Taveras and Paste magazine also heavily praised this aspect of their character, calling them one of the best Pokémon species in the franchise as a whole in particular due to being "so freaking funny" as a "hater" in regards to their dedication against Corviknight.

Jenni Lada of Siliconera in particular voiced significant praise for Tinkaton, describing them alongside their evolution line as "the best of the best" in Scarlet and Violet. While she praised the species's competitive abilities within the games, in particular in light of the unique Gigaton Hammer attack, more significant praise went to the character's aesthetic growth as they progressed, with the hammer growing in size to match their developing character. Additional praise was given to their Pokédex entries, which accented this further while also providing a sense of community amongst the evolution line, as well as a sense of personality to Tinkaton themselves that painted them as a "gremlin" and "a lovable nightmare" due to their rivalry with other Steel-type Pokémon and competitive nature amongst themselves. Lada closed by stating that while a case could be made for many of the new species in Scarlet and Violet to be considered the best, Tinkaton is "an example of great character design in a pair of games filled with winners".
