= Diglett and Dugtrio =

Pokémon species

- Pokémon characters
- Various Diglett and Dugtrio in the Pokémon TV series
- First game: Pokémon Red and Blue (1996)
- Created by: Shigeki Morimoto (Diglett)
- Designed by: Shigeki Morimoto (Diglett)

In-universe information
- Species: Pokémon
- Type: Ground; Ground and Steel (Alolan forms)

Diglett (/ˈdɪɡlət/; known in Japan as Digda (Japanese: ディグダ)) and its evolution Dugtrio (/dʌɡˈtriːoʊ/; ダグトリオ) are a pair of Pokémon species in the Pokémon franchise. Both Pokémon first appeared in Pokémon Red and Blue, going on to appear in almost every subsequent installment in the series. While Rhydon is the first Pokémon created, Pokémon designer Shigeki Morimoto stated that he originally created Diglett's design as a child. Diglett is a mole-like Pokémon that is almost exclusively seen in the ground. Dugtrio continues to remain in the ground, and adds two extra Diglett to make a trio. They are both Ground-type Pokémon, having simplistic designs, Diglett having two eyes and a nose and Dugtrio having three sets of these.

Variations of Diglett and Dugtrio have been created; in Pokémon Sun and Moon, regional variants called "Alolan" forms were added. Alolan Diglett got three golden strands of hair on its head, while each of Alolan Dugtrio's head has a different gold hairstyle made from Pele's hair. They both gained a Steel type in addition to their Ground type. In Pokémon Scarlet and Violet, a related Pokémon duo were introduced called Wiglett and Wugtrio. The duo are Water type rather than Ground, and are speculated to be convergent evolutions from a common ancestor of Diglett.

Diglett and Dugtrio's full body has been discussed and speculated by fans and writers, as well as how it uses claw-based attacks without visible claws. The Alolan Dugtrio form also received attention, identified by multiple critics as superior to the original form. In 2024, a promotion between The Pokémon Company and Mister Donut saw the release of donuts based on Diglett and Dugtrio, which proved popular. Unintentional variants of the Diglett donut got particular attention on social media, resulting in an apology from its management company, Duskin.

== Concept and creation ==
Diglett is a species of fictional creatures called Pokémon created for the Pokémon media franchise. Developed by Game Freak and published by Nintendo, the Japanese franchise began in 1996 with the video games Pokémon Red and Green for the Game Boy, which were later released in North America as Pokémon Red and Blue in 1998. In these games and their sequels, the player assumes the role of a Trainer whose goal is to capture and use the creatures' special abilities to combat other Pokémon. Some Pokémon can transform into stronger species through a process called evolution via various means, such as exposure to specific items. Each Pokémon has one or two elemental types, which define its advantages and disadvantages when battling other Pokémon. A major goal in each game is to complete the Pokédex, a comprehensive Pokémon encyclopedia, by capturing, evolving, and trading with other Trainers to obtain individuals from all Pokémon species.

Diglett's body is a "brown, oblong shape", and is always seen sticking out of the ground with its whole body unable to be seen. It also has two eyes and a round nose. Its evolved form, Dugtrio, is a composition of three Diglett put together. Diglett has a neutral expression, where Dugtrio's expression is either angry or similar to Diglett's. Both Pokémon have a rare form called a "Shiny" form. Both Pokémon's Shiny forms are a slightly lighter shade of brown with a blue nose. While Rhydon was the first Pokémon designed for the first games in the series, it is documented that Diglett was originally designed as a childhood sketch by designer Shigeki Morimoto, including an flip book animation.

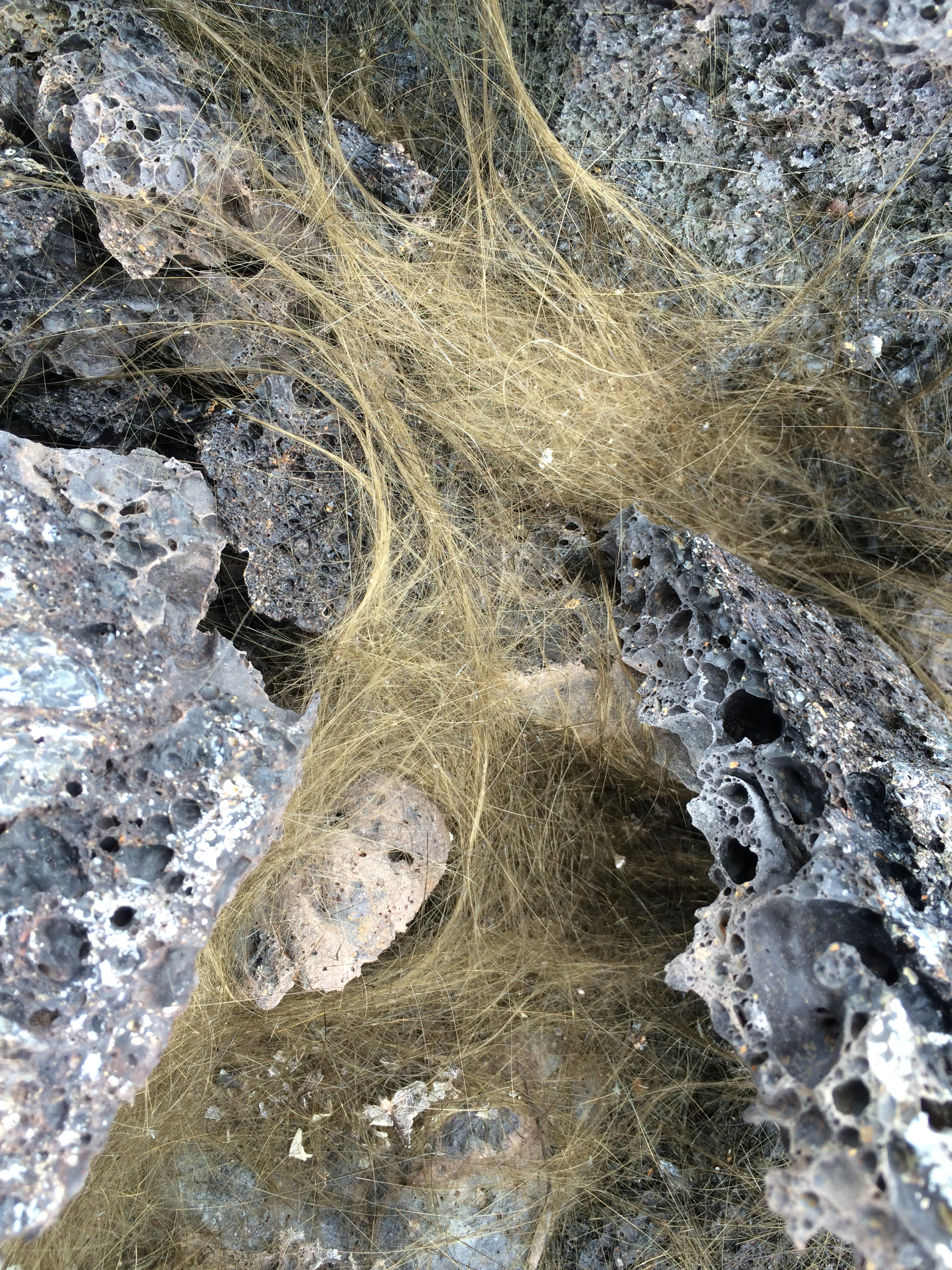
Alolan Dugtrio's hair is said to be Pele's hair, a type of volcanic glass formation that blows in the wind.

The 2016 games Pokémon Sun and Moon introduced new forms of Diglett and Dugtrio native to the games' main location, Alola. They are "regional forms" of Diglett and Dugtrio, and are variants that have adapted to living in the Alola region. Dubbed Alolan Diglett and Alolan Dugtrio, Alolan Diglett strongly resembles the original, though it now has three hairs growing from its head. These hairs are made of metal and act as sensors that can detect change in the environment. Alolan Diglett is sensitive to sunlight and thus spends most of its time underground. Alolan Dugtrio's hair has grown significantly, resembling blonde-haired wigs. The hair is said to be dazzling, and Alola's culture forbids taking Alolan Dugtrio's hair out of the region or the one who took it will receive divine punishment; many come back to Alola yearly to return this taken hair. Alolan Dugtrio's hair is Pele's hair, "glassy strands of cooled lava". It is carried on the wind, snagging on Dugtrio. Alolan Dugtrio is revered as an incarnation of the god of the land in Alola, and natives to Alola will often bow and kneel in its presence. It is also said a number will emerge from the ground when a volcano is about to erupt.

Another species of Pokémon named Wiglett was introduced in the 2022 games Pokémon Scarlet and Violet. In-universe, it's said to have a strong resemblance to Diglett, but that this resemblance is a coincidence, and it is not actually related to Diglett. Wiglett was speculated to be the series' attempt at representing convergent evolution. Wiglett resembles a garden eel, and can evolve into Wugtrio, a Pokémon resembling Dugtrio.

Due to a lack of official Russian content, an unofficial guide was made by combining several legitimate guides. This unofficial Russian Pokedex guide stated that Diglett and Dugtrio have explosive powers when emerging from the ground, leading to them being weaponized by the military as sentient landmines. Criminals often use the pair to rob banks, with promise of pay after the fact, but the criminals escape while they are in the ground.

== Appearances ==
Diglett and Dugtrio first appear in Pokémon Red and Green (Red and Blue in English). In the wild, they are found in Diglett's Cave, with Diglett being more commonly found than Dugtrio. Diglett and Dugtrio reappear in Pokémon Gold and Silver, as well as later entries in the series. Diglett and Dugtrio appear in the 2016 games Pokémon Sun and Moon, where Alolan Diglett and Dugtrio are introduced. Gym Leader and Team Rocket leader Giovanni has featured a Dugtrio on his team multiple times, including Red and Blue, Pokémon Stadium, and Pokémon Ultra Sun and Ultra Moon. They next appear in Pokémon Sword and Shield and its downloadable content expansion pass. In the DLC, a quest involves the player needing to track down Alolan Diglett scattered throughout an island. The player is rewarded at certain milestones of Alolan Diglett found, up to 150, at which point an Alolan Diglett is awarded to the player. Diglett and Dugtrio appear in the 2021 games Pokémon Brilliant Diamond and Shining Pearl, where they can be found in the "Grand Underground", a location underneath the games' main region of Sinnoh. The more Diglett and Dugtrio encountered by the player in the Underground, the greater the chance players can get better rewards. Diglett appears in Pokémon Scarlet and Violet, alongside Wiglett, a Pokémon greatly resembling Diglett.

Diglett and Dugtrio appear in the Pokémon anime series, first appearing in an episode titled "Dig Those Diglett!". In Pokémon the Series: Sun & Moon, an episode was aired centering around Alolan Dugtrio, where wore wigs similar to its hair. A Diglett also appears in the series Pokémon Concierge. Diglett and Dugtrio appear in the spin-off game Pokémon Go alongside their Alolan counterparts and Wiglett and Wugtrio. Diglett and Dugtrio also appear in Pokémon Snap, Pokémon Stadium 2, Pokémon Mystery Dungeon: Rescue Team DX, Pokémon Sleep, Pokémon Trading Card Game Pocket, and Pokémon Pokopia. Both also appear in the Pokémon Trading Card Game.

A fan-made minigame was created titled "Diglett", named after the Pokémon species, for the video game Halo Infinite, compared to the game Whac-A-Mole by Windows Central writer Brendan Lowry. This minigame tasked players with peeking out of holes to use their sniper rifles against opponents, though rendering them vulnerable. It was used by Halo Infinite developers to address aiming issues with the game.

== Merchandise ==
Diglett and Dugtrio have been featured in multiple pieces of merchandise; Diglett has multiple pieces of clothing, and a Diglett-themed umbrella stand, while both received plushies, An official Pokémon-themed cookbook was released, featuring a potato-based dish designing to resemble Diglett. The government of Fukuoka, Japan, partnered with The Pokémon Company to add Pokémon-themed manhole covers, one of which depicts Alolan Dugtrio.

In 2024, as part of a limited series of collaborations with Mister Donut, a Diglett-themed donut called "Pon de Digda" was released in Japan in November 2024, with sales scheduled to end in December 2024. The donut has a ring-shaped base which is topped with a mixture of chocolate crunch and custard cream. In the center, it has a caramel-flavored cream puff. They also did the Dugtrio Caramel Donut, which is filled with custard and whipped cream. Another donut based on Dugtrio was released called "Churro de Dugtrio". Like "Pon de Digda", this is designed to resemble Dugtrio, using a heart-shaped churro base and a choux pastry filled with whipped cream and coated with caramel-flavored chocolate. As part of this collaboration, Mister Donut also released various merchandise featuring Diglett and Dugtrio, including a bag, towel, and pouch. On social media, multiple users posted Pom de Digda donut variants, noting unusual shapes or designs. As a result of these variations, social media users started a trend of appreciating the variations and searching for unusual Diglett, leading to Pon de Digda being sold out. In response to the discussion surrounding it, a spokesperson for Duskin, the management company of Mister Donut in Japan, apologized, stating that the variations were not intentional and occurred due to a lack of guidance. Following this campaign, there have been attempts to recreate Pon de Digda by multiple people on social media and with different materials, such as by a Japanese confectionery shop.

== Reception ==
Diglett was covered as part of IGN's "Pokémon of the Day" series. In its piece, a writer, despite enjoying Ground-type Pokémon, stated that she had no appreciation for Diglett, being particularly critical of its nose. She felt that it was not competitively viable despite its high speed, stating that people who are not interested in Ground types tend to have an interest in Dugtrio due to its speed. GamesRadar writer Jake Magee was critical of Diglett's design, stating that lacked any discernible characteristics aside from its "brown, oblong shape" and describing it as "cartoony and useless-looking". He was more critical of Dugtrio's design, stating that the fact that it was just three Diglett made it worse and calling it the "epitome" of laziness in Pokémon designs. TechRaptor writer Robert Grosso considered Dugtrio among the worst designs in the first generation of Pokémon, stating that the design trend in this generation of three-headed Pokémon species was on the "lower-end of the best design criteria", but Dugtrio was the most generic of this concept. He felt that the design concept was clever, but the execution was generic, arguing that three-headed Pokémon like Dodrio and Magneton had more going for them. On its competitive viability, Grosso felt that, while it had good speed, it was too frail to find its way onto competitive teams. NintendoLife staff was similarly critical of Dugtrio; while they were more supportive of Diglett, they were critical of Dugtrio's design due to it just being three Diglett.

Its Alolan form was more well received. Following the release of the demo of Sun and Moon, it became a meme due to its hair. Robert Grosso was more fond of its Alolan form, stating that the redesign helped make the three heads more diverse, but still not as interesting as other Alolan Pokémon. Kotaku writer Ari Notis felt disappointed by getting an Alolan Diglett in Sword and Shield as a reward for collecting all the Alolan Diglett, stating that its type combination was particularly weak, and criticized Alolan Dugtrio for its hair.

The nature of Diglett and Dugtrio, particularly what they look like underneath the ground, has been the subject of discussion by critics. The ambiguity caused speculation and illustrations of Diglett's true form, particularly with how it is able to use claw-based attacks like Scratch, with critics such as Entertainment Weekly writer Jonathan Dornbush and Dot Esports writer Yash Nair stating that the mystery behind the Pokémon was a part of its appeal. Real Sound staff noted that a glitch in Scarlet and Violet allowed players to see Diglett from underground, showing it growing from a diamond-shaped rock. They believed that it was not intended to be seen, and thus the designers settled on this design. Screen Rant writer Brent Koepp stated that the nature of Diglett's nose was debated prior to Pokémon X and Y, with players debating whether it was a nose or a mouth. Despite noting that this had been settled in earlier 3D games and the anime, he felt that the debate was the product of players who never seen it in these.
