= List of generation IX Pokémon =

The international logo for the Pokémon franchise

The ninth generation (Generation IX) of the Pokémon franchise features 120 titular species of creatures introduced to the core video game series in the Nintendo Switch games Pokémon Scarlet and Violet. The first Pokémon of the generation were revealed on 27 February 2022 in a Pokémon Presents livestream presentation. Scarlet and Violet were released on 18 November 2022.

Pokémon are a species of fictional creatures created for the Pokémon media franchise. Developed by Game Freak and published by Nintendo, the Japanese franchise began in 1996 with the video games Pokémon Red and Green for the Game Boy, which were later released in North America as Pokémon Red and Blue in 1998. In these games and their sequels, the player assumes the role of a Trainer whose goal is to capture and use the creatures' special abilities to combat other Pokémon. Some Pokémon can transform into stronger species through a process called evolution via various means, such as exposure to specific items. Each Pokémon have one or two elemental types, which define its advantages and disadvantages when battling other Pokémon. A major goal in each game is to complete the Pokédex, a comprehensive Pokémon encyclopedia, by capturing, evolving, and trading with other Trainers to obtain individuals from all Pokémon species.

Pokémon Scarlet and Violet take place in Paldea, which is heavily based on Spain, as well as other areas in the Iberian Peninsula, with the game's DLC expansions The Teal Mask and The Indigo Disk taking place in the Kitakami region and the Blueberry Academy, respectively. Kitakami is based on Japan, while the Blueberry Academy is a school environment set in the Unova region, the main location of the 2010 games Pokémon Black and White. Scarlet and Violet also feature a special mechanic known as "Terastallization" which allow the player's Pokémon to change their types in battle. The game Pokémon Legends: Z-A is set in the Kalos region, the main location of 2013 games Pokémon X and Y. It also saw the return of the "Mega Evolution" mechanic which was first introduced in those games; Mega Evolutions are powerful forms of Pokémon that can be used during Pokémon battles.

== List of Pokémon ==
List of Pokémon species introduced in Generation IX (2022)
Name (Note: English and Japanese name, as well as National Pokédex number)	Type(s)	Evolves from	Evolves into	Notes
Sprigatito Nyaoha (ニャオハ) (0906)	Grass	—N/a	Floragato (#907)	Sprigatito is a cat-like Pokémon. Sprigatito has been a popular Pokémon since its debut, as well as being nicknamed "Weed Cat" by fans when it was first revealed to the public, and has attracted commentary in regards to its evolutionary line, primarily in regards to whether its evolutions would be bipedal or quadrupedal. Floragato is Sprigatito's evolution. It is a bipedal cat-like Pokémon. Meowscarada is a bipedal, humanoid, lynx-like Pokémon and the evolution of Floragato. Meowscarada has been a popular Pokémon since its debut, with critics noting that its design helped make it an appealing Pokémon despite initial concern over Sprigatito becoming bipedal by fans.
Floragato Nyarōte (ニャローテ) (0907)	Grass	Sprigatito (#906)	Meowscarada (#908)	
Meowscarada Masukānya (マスカーニャ) (0908)	Grass / Dark	Floragato (#907)	—N/a	
Fuecoco Hogēta (ホゲータ) (0909)	Fire	—N/a	Crocalor (#910)	Fuecoco is a crocodile-like Pokémon. The name "Fuecoco" stems from the Spanish words fuego, meaning "fire", and cocodrilo, meaning "crocodile". Fuecoco has seen significant popularity and praise since its debut, primarily for its appealing design. Polls conducted by Inside Games found Fuecoco to be popular due to its vacant expression and cute appearance. Crocalor is a larger, crocodile-like Pokémon that evolves from Fuecoco. It wears a burning nest with a large egg on its head, resembling a sombrero. Skeledirge is a crocodile-like Pokémon that evolves from Crocalor. Its appearance seems to draw influence from the holiday known as the Day of the Dead, and its name comes from the words "skeleton" and "dirge". The egg that it had as a Crocalor has now hatched into a small bird made of fire, which rests on its nose and morphs into a stand microphone when Skeledirge uses its signature move "Torch Song".
Crocalor Achigēta (アチゲータ) (0910)	Fire	Fuecoco (#909)	Skeledirge (#911)	
Skeledirge Raudobōn (ラウドボーン) (0911)	Fire / Ghost	Crocalor (#910)	—N/a	
Quaxly Kuwassu (クワッス) (0912)	Water	—N/a	Quaxwell (#913)	Quaxly is a duck-like Pokémon. It was described by Inside Games as having numerous sailor-motifs in its design. Quaxly's resemblance to Donald Duck became a brief internet meme. The gel secreted by its feathers repels water and grime. Quaxwell is a duck-like Pokémon and an evolution of Quaxly. Quaxwell evolves into Quaquaval, which also resembles a duck, with some additional apparent influence from peacocks. Quaquaval is believed to take inspiration from Carnival. Quaquaval is constantly dancing, which appears to be inspired by both Carnival and various samba dances. Its Fighting-type is believed to take inspiration from capoeira.
Quaxwell Werukamo (ウェルカモ) (0913)	Water	Quaxly (#912)	Quaquaval (#914)	
Quaquaval Wēnibaru (ウェーニバル) (0914)	Water / Fighting	Quaxwell (#913)	—N/a	
Lechonk Guruton (グルトン) (0915)	Normal	—N/a	Oinkologne (#914)	Lechonk is a pig-like Pokémon. Lechonk's English name is a combination of "lechón", a Spanish pork dish, "oink", an onomatopoeia for the sound of a pig, and "chonk", which itself is derived from "chunk(y)", slang for a fat animal. Oinkologne is a cologne-themed hog-like Pokémon that evolves from Lechonk, and has different appearances based on its gender.
Oinkologne Pafyūton (パフュートン) (0916)	Normal	Lechonk (#915)	—N/a	Lechonk is a pig-like Pokémon. Lechonk's English name is a combination of "lechón", a Spanish pork dish, "oink", an onomatopoeia for the sound of a pig, and "chonk", which itself is derived from "chunk(y)", slang for a fat animal. Oinkologne is a cologne-themed hog-like Pokémon that evolves from Lechonk, and has different appearances based on its gender.
Tarountula Tamanchura (タマンチュラ) (0917)	Bug	—N/a	Spidops (#918)	Tarountula is a tarantula-like Pokémon. It carries a ball on its back resembling a ball of yarn. Spidops is a spider-like Pokémon and the evolution of Tarountula. It has eight legs, though it stands bipedally. It traps other Pokémon inside of web traps for its own enjoyment.
Spidops Wanaidā (ワナイダー) (0918)	Bug	Tarountula (#917)	—N/a	Tarountula is a tarantula-like Pokémon. It carries a ball on its back resembling a ball of yarn. Spidops is a spider-like Pokémon and the evolution of Tarountula. It has eight legs, though it stands bipedally. It traps other Pokémon inside of web traps for its own enjoyment.
Nymble Mamebatta (マメバッタ) (0919)	Bug	—N/a	Lokix (#920)	Nymble is a small, grasshopper-like Pokémon. It evolves into Lokix, which more closely resembles locusts in particular. Both Pokémon have six legs, with their rear legs kept folded up. Nymble can unfold its rear legs to jump far distances; meanwhile, Lokix can unfurl and stand on its rear legs to enter a battle stance known as Showdown Mode, in which is can deliver exceptionally powerful attacks, but will quickly tire itself out if it remains in this stance for too long. Lokix appears to take inspiration from the titular heroes of the Kamen Rider franchise, with its tendency to use kick-based attacks seemingly being in reference to the "Rider Kick" finishing move used by Kamen Rider protagonists.
Lokix Ekusureggu (エクスレッグ) (0920)	Bug / Dark	Nymble (#919)	—N/a	
Pawmi Pamo (パモ) (0921)	Electric	—N/a	Pawmo (#922)	Pawmi, Pawmo, and Pawmot are marmot-like Pokémon. They highly resemble Pikachu in terms of design, which is part of a recurring series design tradition. Pawmi's cheeks contain weak electrical sacs that transfer static electricity to its palms. Pawmi evolves into Pawmo, and then Pawmot.
Pawmo Pamotto (パモット) (0922)	Electric / Fighting	Pawmi (#921)	Pawmot (#923)	Pawmi, Pawmo, and Pawmot are marmot-like Pokémon. They highly resemble Pikachu in terms of design, which is part of a recurring series design tradition. Pawmi's cheeks contain weak electrical sacs that transfer static electricity to its palms. Pawmi evolves into Pawmo, and then Pawmot.
Pawmot Pāmotto (パーモット) (0923)	Electric / Fighting	Pawmo (#922)	—N/a	Pawmi, Pawmo, and Pawmot are marmot-like Pokémon. They highly resemble Pikachu in terms of design, which is part of a recurring series design tradition. Pawmi's cheeks contain weak electrical sacs that transfer static electricity to its palms. Pawmi evolves into Pawmo, and then Pawmot.
Tandemaus Wakkanezumi (ワッカネズミ) (0924)	Normal	—N/a	Maushold (#925)	Tandemaus and Maushold are a pair of mouse-like Pokémon. Unlike most Pokémon, the pair are made up of multiple individuals, with Tandemaus consisting of a pair of Pokémon. When Tandemaus evolves into Maushold, Maushold gains either one or two children, nicknamed "Family of Three" and "Family of Four", respectively. Maushold's Family of Three form is more rare than its Family of Four form. They have been noted for their battling power, with Maushold's "Population Bomb" attack causing high damage in comparison to other attacks.
Maushold Ikkanezumi (イッカネズミ) (0925)	Normal	Tandemaus (#924)	—N/a	
Fidough Papimotchi (パピモッチ) (0926)	Fairy	—N/a	Dachsbun (#927)	Fidough is a dough-themed dog-like Pokémon. It is protected by chefs due to the valuable yeast it exhales. Fidough can puff up their bodies to make themselves more intimidating to opponents. Fidough was later made available in real life as a bread-based snack. Dachsbun is a pastry-themed dog-like Pokémon. It evolves from Fidough. Its name comes from "dachshund" and "bun". Fidough and Dachsbun were both designed by Mari Shimazaki, who is known for her work on the Bayonetta series.
Dachsbun Bauttseru (バウッツェル) (0927)	Fairy	Fidough (#926)	—N/a	Fidough is a dough-themed dog-like Pokémon. It is protected by chefs due to the valuable yeast it exhales. Fidough can puff up their bodies to make themselves more intimidating to opponents. Fidough was later made available in real life as a bread-based snack. Dachsbun is a pastry-themed dog-like Pokémon. It evolves from Fidough. Its name comes from "dachshund" and "bun". Fidough and Dachsbun were both designed by Mari Shimazaki, who is known for her work on the Bayonetta series.
Smoliv Minību (ミニーブ) (0928)	Grass / Normal	—N/a	Dolliv (#929)	Smoliv is an olive-like Pokémon. The fruit on top of its head stores a bitter, yet nutritious oil, which Smoliv produces in its body. Its name comes from "small" and "olive". Smoliv grew popular among fans due to its anxious personality and naming. Smoliv evolves into Dolliv, which then evolves into Arboliva. Arboliva, whose name comes from the Spanish árbol (tree) and oliva (olive), resembles an entire olive tree. A significantly larger Arboliva appeared in the Pokémon anime, where it was owned in the series' narrative by Lucius, a powerful trainer from the distant past.
Dolliv Orīnyo (オリーニョ) (0929)	Grass / Normal	Smoliv (#928)	Arboliva (#930)	
Arboliva Orīva (オリーヴァ) (0930)	Grass / Normal	Dolliv (#929)	—N/a	
Squawkabilly Ikirinko (イキリンコ) (0931)	Normal / Flying	No evolution		Squawkabilly is a parrot-like Pokémon. It comes with four different colors of plummage: green, yellow, blue, and white, with each color having their own individual personality. Each color also has different in-battle "abilities", passive skills that provide benefits in battle. Its name is a combination of the words "rockabilly" and "squawk". Flocks of Squawkabilly are used by the "Flying Taxi" service in-game, which allows players to fast travel to locations they have visited, replacing Corviknight, which took on the role in Pokémon Sword and Shield.
Nacli Kojio (コジオ) (0932)	Rock	—N/a	Naclstack (#933)	Nacli, Naclstack, and Garganacl are salt-like Pokémon. Their names are derived from "NaCl", the chemical formula for sodium chloride (table salt). Nacli evolves into Naclstack, and then into Garganacl. A salt shaker based on Nacli was later produced.
Naclstack Jiozumu (ジオヅム) (0933)	Rock	Nacli (#932)	Garganacl (#934)	Nacli, Naclstack, and Garganacl are salt-like Pokémon. Their names are derived from "NaCl", the chemical formula for sodium chloride (table salt). Nacli evolves into Naclstack, and then into Garganacl. A salt shaker based on Nacli was later produced.
Garganacl Kyojiōn (キョジオーン) (0934)	Rock	Naclstack (#933)	—N/a	Nacli, Naclstack, and Garganacl are salt-like Pokémon. Their names are derived from "NaCl", the chemical formula for sodium chloride (table salt). Nacli evolves into Naclstack, and then into Garganacl. A salt shaker based on Nacli was later produced.
Charcadet Karubō (カルボウ) (0935)	Fire	—N/a	Armarouge (#936); Ceruledge (#937)	Charcadet is a small, humanoid Pokémon which appears to be based on both charcoal and squires. It can evolve into two other Pokémon, Armarouge and Ceruledge, which require special items only found in Scarlet and Violet, respectively - the Auspicious Armor (found in Scarlet) will evolve it into Armarouge, which specializes in ranged projectile attacks, while the Malicious Armor (found in Violet) will evolve it into Ceruledge, which specializes in close-range blade attacks.
Armarouge Guren'aruma (グレンアルマ) (0936)	Fire / Psychic	Charcadet (#935)	—N/a	Charcadet is a small, humanoid Pokémon which appears to be based on both charcoal and squires. It can evolve into two other Pokémon, Armarouge and Ceruledge, which require special items only found in Scarlet and Violet, respectively - the Auspicious Armor (found in Scarlet) will evolve it into Armarouge, which specializes in ranged projectile attacks, while the Malicious Armor (found in Violet) will evolve it into Ceruledge, which specializes in close-range blade attacks.
Ceruledge Sōbureizu (ソウブレイズ) (0937)	Fire / Ghost	Charcadet (#935)	—N/a	Charcadet is a small, humanoid Pokémon which appears to be based on both charcoal and squires. It can evolve into two other Pokémon, Armarouge and Ceruledge, which require special items only found in Scarlet and Violet, respectively - the Auspicious Armor (found in Scarlet) will evolve it into Armarouge, which specializes in ranged projectile attacks, while the Malicious Armor (found in Violet) will evolve it into Ceruledge, which specializes in close-range blade attacks.
Tadbulb Zupika (ズピカ) (0938)	Electric	—N/a	Bellibolt (#939)	Tadbulb is a tadpole-like Pokémon resembling a light bulb. It evolves into Bellibolt, a frog-like Pokémon. It is able to expand and contract its elastic body to generate electricity. It has two large round objects on the side of its head, which resemble eyes; its real eyes are located just above its mouth. It was revealed prior to the release of Pokémon Scarlet and Violet during a mock livestream for the fictional, in-universe streamer Iono.
Bellibolt Harabarī (ハラバリー) (0939)	Electric	Tadbulb (#938)	—N/a	Tadbulb is a tadpole-like Pokémon resembling a light bulb. It evolves into Bellibolt, a frog-like Pokémon. It is able to expand and contract its elastic body to generate electricity. It has two large round objects on the side of its head, which resemble eyes; its real eyes are located just above its mouth. It was revealed prior to the release of Pokémon Scarlet and Violet during a mock livestream for the fictional, in-universe streamer Iono.
Wattrel Kaiden (カイデン) (0940)	Electric / Flying	—N/a	Kilowattrel (#941)	Wattrel is a bird-like Pokémon which resembles a storm petrel. It evolves into Kilowattrel, which resembles a frigatebird.
Kilowattrel Taikaiden (タイカイデン) (0941)	Electric / Flying	Wattrel (#940)	—N/a	Wattrel is a bird-like Pokémon which resembles a storm petrel. It evolves into Kilowattrel, which resembles a frigatebird.
Maschiff Orachifu (オラチフ) (0942)	Dark	—N/a	Mabosstiff (#941)	Maschiff is a dog-like Pokémon greatly resembling a mastiff. Maschiff evolves into Mabosstiff. Arven, one of the major characters in Pokémon Scarlet and Violet, has a Mabosstiff as his partner Pokémon. It was injured prior to the games' events, and is slowly healed as the player and Arven collect Herba Mystica, special herbs guarded by massive bosses known as Titan Pokémon.
Mabosstiff Mafitifu (マフィティフ) (0943)	Dark	Maschiff (#942)	—N/a	Maschiff is a dog-like Pokémon greatly resembling a mastiff. Maschiff evolves into Mabosstiff. Arven, one of the major characters in Pokémon Scarlet and Violet, has a Mabosstiff as his partner Pokémon. It was injured prior to the games' events, and is slowly healed as the player and Arven collect Herba Mystica, special herbs guarded by massive bosses known as Titan Pokémon.
Shroodle Shirushurū (シルシュルー) (0944)	Poison / Normal	—N/a	Grafaiai (#945)	Shroodle is a small, poisonous shrew-like Pokémon. It evolves into Grafaiai. Grafaiai is a graffiti-themed Pokémon based on an aye-aye with some elements of the slow loris; it was teased prior to the release of Pokémon Scarlet and Violet through a series of cryptic photos resembling the Oma forest on August 30, 2022.
Grafaiai Taginguru (タギングル) (0945)	Poison / Normal	Shroodle (#944)	—N/a	Shroodle is a small, poisonous shrew-like Pokémon. It evolves into Grafaiai. Grafaiai is a graffiti-themed Pokémon based on an aye-aye with some elements of the slow loris; it was teased prior to the release of Pokémon Scarlet and Violet through a series of cryptic photos resembling the Oma forest on August 30, 2022.
Bramblin Anokusa (アノクサ) (0946)	Grass / Ghost	—N/a	Brambleghast (#947)	Bramblin and Brambleghast are a pair of Pokémon based on tumbleweeds. Bramblin evolves into Brambleghast.
Brambleghast Anohoragusa (アノホラグサ) (0947)	Grass / Ghost	Bramblin (#946)	—N/a	Bramblin and Brambleghast are a pair of Pokémon based on tumbleweeds. Bramblin evolves into Brambleghast.
Toedscool Nonokurage (ノノクラゲ) (0948)	Ground / Grass	—N/a	Toedscruel (#949)	Toedscool and Toedscruel are a pair of Pokémon which resemble mushrooms, particularly of the woodear variety. The pair greatly resemble the Pokémon Tentacool and Tentacruel, which debuted in Pokémon Red and Blue, but are different species entirely; it is believed that their similar appearance is the result of convergent evolution.
Toedscruel Rikukurage (リククラゲ) (0949)	Ground / Grass	Toedscool (#948)	—N/a	Toedscool and Toedscruel are a pair of Pokémon which resemble mushrooms, particularly of the woodear variety. The pair greatly resemble the Pokémon Tentacool and Tentacruel, which debuted in Pokémon Red and Blue, but are different species entirely; it is believed that their similar appearance is the result of convergent evolution.
Klawf Gakegani (ガケガニ) (0950)	Rock	No evolution		Klawf is a crab-like Pokémon that resembles the horsehair crab. It lives on cliffs, usually hanging upside down while waiting for prey, but it cannot hang for long before its blood begins to rush to its head. One particularly large Klawf acts as a "Titan Pokémon", a boss Pokémon in the game. Klawf Sticks, made from ground up Klawf shells, are also food items in the game.
Capsakid Kapusaiji (カプサイジ) (0951)	Grass	—N/a	Scovillain (#952)	Capsakid are small plant Pokémon that evolve into Scovillain, a two-headed Pokémon. The two greatly resemble chili peppers. Scovillain's name references the scoville scale, a scale used to measure the spiciness of chili peppers.
Scovillain Sukoviran (スコヴィラン) (0952)	Grass / Fire	Capsakid (#951)	Mega Evolution	Capsakid are small plant Pokémon that evolve into Scovillain, a two-headed Pokémon. The two greatly resemble chili peppers. Scovillain's name references the scoville scale, a scale used to measure the spiciness of chili peppers.
Rellor Shigaroko (シガロコ) (0953)	Bug	—N/a	Rabsca (#954)	Rellor and Rabsca are beetle-like Pokémon, with Rellor resembling a dung beetle and Rabsca a scarab. Rellor evolves into Rabsca. Rellor rolls a ball of mud, composed of dirt and psychic energy. Rabsca's ball contains an infant.
Rabsca Berakasu (ベラカス) (0954)	Bug / Psychic	Rellor (#953)	—N/a	Rellor and Rabsca are beetle-like Pokémon, with Rellor resembling a dung beetle and Rabsca a scarab. Rellor evolves into Rabsca. Rellor rolls a ball of mud, composed of dirt and psychic energy. Rabsca's ball contains an infant.
Flittle Hirahina (ヒラヒナ) (0955)	Psychic	—N/a	Espathra (#956)	Flittle is a small bird Pokémon that evolves into Espathra, an ostrich-like Pokémon. Espathra's name references both Cleopatra and ESP.
Espathra Kuesupatora (クエスパトラ) (0956)	Psychic	Flittle (#955)	—N/a	Flittle is a small bird Pokémon that evolves into Espathra, an ostrich-like Pokémon. Espathra's name references both Cleopatra and ESP.
Tinkatink Kanuchan (カヌチャン) (0957)	Fairy / Steel	—N/a	Tinkatuff (#958)	Tinkatink is a small, pink Pokémon which wields a handmade metal hammer. It evolves into Tinkatuff, which later evolves into Tinkaton; as these Pokémon evolve, their hammers are reinforced to become stronger and larger. Tinkaton is said to have learned to upgrade its hammer with metals out of pure spite after being bullied by Steel-type Pokémon as Tinkatink and Tinkatuff, and it is able to throw boulders with its hammer to knock Corviknight – a large, metallic bird-like Pokémon – out of the sky. It has received a positive response from the community since its debut. A Tinkatink is owned by one of the main characters, Dot, in the anime series Pokémon Horizons: The Series.
Tinkatuff Nakanuchan (ナカヌチャン) (0958)	Fairy / Steel	Tinkatink (#957)	Tinkaton (#959)	
Tinkaton Dekanuchan (デカヌチャン) (0959)	Fairy / Steel	Tinkatuff (#958)	—N/a	
Wiglett Umidiguda (ウミディグダ) (0960)	Water	—N/a	Wugtrio (#961)	Wiglett is a garden eel-like Pokémon. It was revealed prior to the release of Pokémon Scarlet and Violet via a mock seminar that showcased wild Pokémon interacting with the world of Pokémon Scarlet and Violet. While bearing similarities to the Pokémon Diglett, it is a different species, with their similarities likely a result of convergent evolution. Wiglett has been commented on for its phallic appearance by both fans and critics. (Note: Supported by multiple sources:) Wugtrio is a garden eel-like Pokémon that evolves from Wiglett.
Wugtrio Umitorio (ウミトリオ) (0961)	Water	Wiglett (#960)	—N/a	Wiglett is a garden eel-like Pokémon. It was revealed prior to the release of Pokémon Scarlet and Violet via a mock seminar that showcased wild Pokémon interacting with the world of Pokémon Scarlet and Violet. While bearing similarities to the Pokémon Diglett, it is a different species, with their similarities likely a result of convergent evolution. Wiglett has been commented on for its phallic appearance by both fans and critics. Wugtrio is a garden eel-like Pokémon that evolves from Wiglett.
Bombirdier Otoshidori (オトシドリ) (0962)	Flying / Dark	No evolution		Bombirdier are stork-like Pokémon with apron-like appendages on their torsos, with which they carry rocks to drop from above. One particularly large Bombirdier acts as a "Titan Pokémon", a boss Pokémon in the game.
Finizen Namiiruka (ナミイルカ) (0963)	Water	—N/a	Palafin (#964)	Finizen is a dolphin-like Pokémon that evolves into Palafin. Palafin has two forms. The first is identical to Finizen in appearance except for a heart shape on its stomach, called the "Zero Form". The second is the "Hero Form" which takes on a muscular, superhero-esque appearance.
Palafin Irukaman (イルカマン) (0964)	Water	Finizen (#963)	—N/a	Finizen is a dolphin-like Pokémon that evolves into Palafin. Palafin has two forms. The first is identical to Finizen in appearance except for a heart shape on its stomach, called the "Zero Form". The second is the "Hero Form" which takes on a muscular, superhero-esque appearance.
Varoom Buroron (ブロロン) (0965)	Steel / Poison	—N/a	Revavroom (#966)	Varoom and Revavroom are engine-like Pokémon. Varoom evolves into Revavroom. Yūsuke Kozaki designed both Varoom and Revavroom.
Revavroom Burororōmu (ブロロローム) (0966)	Steel / Poison	Varoom (#965)	—N/a	Varoom and Revavroom are engine-like Pokémon. Varoom evolves into Revavroom. Yūsuke Kozaki designed both Varoom and Revavroom.
Cyclizar Mototokage (モトトカゲ) (0967)	Dragon / Normal	No evolution		Cyclizar is a bicycle-themed lizard-like Pokémon that was introduced in Pokémon Scarlet and Violet. Cyclizar has allowed people in the Pokémon universe to ride on its back since ancient times and depictions of this have been found in 10,000-year-old murals. Koraidon and Miraidon, two Legendary Pokémon in the game, are relatives of the Pokémon which hail from the past and future, respectively.
Orthworm Mimizuzu (ミミズズ) (0968)	Steel	No evolution		Orthworm is a species of Pokémon resembling a metallic earthworm. One particularly large Orthworm acts as a "Titan Pokémon", a boss Pokémon in the game.
Glimmet Kirāme (キラーメ) (0969)	Rock / Poison	—N/a	Glimmora (#970)	Glimmet and Glimmora are crystalline species of Pokémon. Their bodies are made of crystallized poisonous energy. Glimmet evolves into Glimmora.
Glimmora Kirafuroru (キラフロル) (0970)	Rock / Poison	Glimmet (#969)	Mega Evolution	Glimmet and Glimmora are crystalline species of Pokémon. Their bodies are made of crystallized poisonous energy. Glimmet evolves into Glimmora.
Greavard Bochi (ボチ) (0971)	Ghost	—N/a	Houndstone (#972)	Greavard is a small puppy-like Pokémon introduced in Pokémon Scarlet and Violet. It inadvertently absorbs the life force of people around it. It was revealed during a found footage stream by a member of the Ghost-Type Pokémon Club from Naranja Academy, the school the player goes to in Pokémon Scarlet. Houndstone is a Ghost-type Pokémon based on a hound, a type of dog. It is the evolved form of Greavard. It has a large tombstone on its head, replacing the candle in the head of Greavard.
Houndstone Hakadoggu (ハカドッグ) (0972)	Ghost	Greavard (#971)	—N/a	Greavard is a small puppy-like Pokémon introduced in Pokémon Scarlet and Violet. It inadvertently absorbs the life force of people around it. It was revealed during a found footage stream by a member of the Ghost-Type Pokémon Club from Naranja Academy, the school the player goes to in Pokémon Scarlet. Houndstone is a Ghost-type Pokémon based on a hound, a type of dog. It is the evolved form of Greavard. It has a large tombstone on its head, replacing the candle in the head of Greavard.
Flamigo Karamingo (カラミンゴ) (0973)	Flying / Fighting	No evolution		Flamigo is a Pokémon that resembles a flamingo. Flamigo was criticized by fans for its "bland" design, though it grew in popularity in Pokémon's competitive scene due to its strength. Flamigo also proved popular in the speedrunning community for Scarlet and Violet, in part due to its high stats and early obtainability in-game.
Cetoddle Arukujira (アルクジラ) (0974)	Ice	—N/a	Cetitan (#975)	Cetoddle is a terrestrial, whale-like Pokémon. Cetitan, its evolution, is covered in a thick layer of blubber, with strong muscles to support its blubber-like body. It can gather ice energy to make the surrounding area very cold. Yūsuke Kozaki designed both Cetoddle and Cetitan.
Cetitan Harukujira (ハルクジラ) (0975)	Ice	Cetoddle (#974)	—N/a	Cetoddle is a terrestrial, whale-like Pokémon. Cetitan, its evolution, is covered in a thick layer of blubber, with strong muscles to support its blubber-like body. It can gather ice energy to make the surrounding area very cold. Yūsuke Kozaki designed both Cetoddle and Cetitan.
Veluza Migarūsa (ミガルーサ) (0976)	Water / Psychic	No evolution		Veluza is a fish Pokémon resembling a hake. Veluza sheds flesh off its body, which is eaten by humans in-universe.
Dondozo Heirassha (ヘイラッシャ) (0977)	Water	No evolution		Dondozo and Tatsugiri are a pair of Pokémon biologically unassociated with each other, but have a symbiotic relationship. Tatsugiri resembles sushi, while Dondozo resembles a catfish. Tatsugiri has three different forms, each with different color schemes. A pair of them acted as "Titan Pokémon", special boss opponents in the Pokémon Scarlet and Violet's story. Dondozo and Tatsugiri were both designed by James Turner, who had previously worked as a character designer for the Pokémon franchise.
Tatsugiri Sharitatsu (シャリタツ) (0978)	Dragon / Water	—N/a	Mega Evolution	Dondozo and Tatsugiri are a pair of Pokémon biologically unassociated with each other, but have a symbiotic relationship. Tatsugiri resembles sushi, while Dondozo resembles a catfish. Tatsugiri has three different forms, each with different color schemes. A pair of them acted as "Titan Pokémon", special boss opponents in the Pokémon Scarlet and Violet's story. Dondozo and Tatsugiri were both designed by James Turner, who had previously worked as a character designer for the Pokémon franchise.
Annihilape Konoyozaru (コノヨザル) (0979)	Fighting / Ghost	Primeape (#057)	—N/a	Annihilape is the evolution of Primeape, a simian Pokémon which first appeared in Pokémon Red and Blue. Annihilape came to be when the anger built up by Primeape grew to a capacity that its body couldn't contain, causing a complete overflow of power and the consequent evolution into Annihilape.
Clodsire Doō (ドオー) (0980)	Poison / Ground	Wooper (#194)	—N/a	Clodsire is the evolution of Wooper's Paldean regional variant. It greatly resembles the Iberian ribbed newt, and mimics the newt's method of attack as it extends its ribs from its body.
Farigiraf Rikikirin (リキキリン) (0981)	Normal / Psychic	Girafarig (#203)	—N/a	Farigiraf is a giraffe-esque Pokémon introduced in Pokémon Scarlet and Violet that evolves from Girafarig, which was introduced in Pokémon Gold and Silver. Girafarig's tail synced with its mind as it evolved, and the two work in tandem to enhance its psychic power. Like Girafarig, Farigiraf's name is a palindrome, meaning it can be read the same backwards as it can forwards.
Dudunsparce Nokokotchi (ノココッチ) (0982)	Normal	Dunsparce (#206)	—N/a	Dudunsparce is an evolution of Dunsparce, a tsuchinoko-inspired Pokémon introduced in Pokémon Gold and Silver. It gains an additional body segment, but other Dudunsparce, known as the "Three Segment Form", have an additional body segment that is more rare than standard Dudunsparce.
Kingambit Dodogezan (ドドゲザン) (0983)	Dark / Steel	Bisharp (#625)	—N/a	Kingambit is an evolution of the Pokémon Bisharp, resembling a shogun.
Great Tusk Idainakiba (イダイナキバ) (0984)	Ground / Fighting	No evolution		Great Tusk, Scream Tail, Brute Bonnet, Flutter Mane, Slither Wing, and Sandy Shocks are Paradox Pokémon – Pokémon which hail from different time periods than normal Pokémon – which appear in Pokémon Scarlet and Violet. They hail from the distant past, and are sometimes dubbed "Ancient Pokémon". They are first mentioned in-game in special magazines known as "Occulture" which give additional rumor-based information on the species. The Paradox Pokémon are stated to hail from alternative realities in the DLC expansion for the game, The Indigo Disk. Great Tusk is an ancient Paradox Pokémon based on the Pokémon Donphan, an elephantine Pokémon. It appears as a "Titan Pokémon", a special boss opponent in-game. Scream Tail is an ancient Paradox Pokémon resembling the Pokémon Jigglypuff, a balloon-like Pokémon known for its singing voice. Brute Bonnet is an ancient Paradox Pokémon resembling the Pokémon Amoonguss, a mushroom-like Pokémon. Flutter Mane is an ancient Paradox Pokémon resembling the Pokémon Misdreavus, a ghost-like Pokémon. Slither Wing is an ancient Paradox Pokémon resembling the Pokémon Volcarona, a moth-like Pokémon. Sandy Shocks is an ancient Paradox Pokémon resembling the Pokémon Magneton, a trio of a Pokémon named Magnemite, which resemble magnets.
Scream Tail Sakebushippo (サケブシッポ) (0985)	Fairy / Psychic	No evolution		
Brute Bonnet Araburutake (アラブルタケ) (0986)	Grass / Dark	No evolution		
Flutter Mane Habatakukami (ハバタクカミ) (0987)	Ghost / Fairy	No evolution		
Slither Wing Chiohauhane (チヲハウハネ) (0988)	Bug / Fighting	No evolution		
Sandy Shocks Sunanokegawa (スナノケガワ) (0989)	Electric / Ground	No evolution		
Iron Treads Tetsunowadachi (テツノワダチ) (0990)	Ground / Steel	No evolution		Iron Treads, Iron Bundle, Iron Hands, Iron Jugulis, Iron Moth, and Iron Thorns are Paradox Pokémon – Pokémon which hail from different time periods than normal Pokémon – which appear in Pokémon Scarlet and Violet. They hail from the distant future, and are sometimes dubbed "Future Pokémon". They are first mentioned in-game in special magazines known as "Occulture" which give additional rumor-based information on the species. The Paradox Pokémon are stated to hail from alternative realities in the DLC expansion for the game, The Indigo Disk. Iron Treads is a futuristic Paradox Pokémon resembling the Pokémon Donphan, an elephantine Pokémon. Iron Treads acts as a "Titan Pokémon", a special boss opponent in-game. Iron Bundle is a futuristic Paradox Pokémon resembling the Pokémon Delibird, a bird-like Pokémon which resembles Santa Claus. Iron Hands is a futuristic Paradox Pokémon resembling the Pokémon Hariyama, a Pokémon resembling a sumo wrestler. Iron Jugulis is a futuristic Paradox Pokémon resembling the Pokémon Hydreigon, a Pokémon resembling a hydra. Iron Moth is a futuristic Paradox Pokémon resembling the Pokémon Volcarona, a moth-like Pokémon. Iron Thorns is a futuristic Paradox Pokémon resembling the Pokémon Tyranitar, a Godzilla-resembling Pokémon. Specifically, it may be a reference to Mechagodzilla, the robotic counterpart of Godzilla.
Iron Bundle Tetsunotsutsumi (テツノツツミ) (0991)	Ice / Water	No evolution		
Iron Hands Tetsunokaina (テツノカイナ) (0992)	Fighting / Electric	No evolution		
Iron Jugulis Tetsunokōbe (テツノコウベ) (0993)	Dark / Flying	No evolution		
Iron Moth Tetsunodokuga (テツノドクガ) (0994)	Fire / Poison	No evolution		
Iron Thorns Tetsunoibara (テツノイバラ) (0995)	Rock / Electric	No evolution		
Frigibax Sebie (セビエ) (0996)	Dragon / Ice	—N/a	Arctibax (#997)	Frigibax is a small dragon-like Pokémon. It evolves into Arctibax, which evolves into Baxcalibur. Baxcalibur is a large ice dragon Pokémon resembling a Spinosaurus and a kaiju, and belongs to the fanmade category known as "pseudo-legendary Pokémon", characterizing typically Dragon-type Pokémon with a three-stage evolution line and a high base stat total.
Arctibax Segōru (セゴール) (0997)	Dragon / Ice	Frigibax (#996)	Baxcalibur (#998)	Frigibax is a small dragon-like Pokémon. It evolves into Arctibax, which evolves into Baxcalibur. Baxcalibur is a large ice dragon Pokémon resembling a Spinosaurus and a kaiju, and belongs to the fanmade category known as "pseudo-legendary Pokémon", characterizing typically Dragon-type Pokémon with a three-stage evolution line and a high base stat total.
Baxcalibur Segureibu (セグレイブ) (0998)	Dragon / Ice	Arctibax (#997)	Mega Evolution	Frigibax is a small dragon-like Pokémon. It evolves into Arctibax, which evolves into Baxcalibur. Baxcalibur is a large ice dragon Pokémon resembling a Spinosaurus and a kaiju, and belongs to the fanmade category known as "pseudo-legendary Pokémon", characterizing typically Dragon-type Pokémon with a three-stage evolution line and a high base stat total.
Gimmighoul Korekurē (コレクレー) (0999)	Ghost	—N/a	Gholdengo (#1000)	Gimmighoul is a small Pokémon that hides in treasure chests. It has two forms: the chest form and a "Roaming Form" which leaves the chest and wanders by itself carrying a single coin. The Roaming Form can only be obtained via Pokémon Go. Prior to its reveal, a special website was made, depicting Gimmighoul's chest, which eventually opened up following Gimmighoul's reveal, serving as an information hub for information related to the Pokémon. Gimmighoul also appeared in Go prior to its announcement, where, following an in-game event, it followed players around the map. Gimmighoul evolves into Gholdengo when it is leveled up after a total of 999 Gimmighoul Coins are gathered by the player. Gholdengo is a golden-bodied Pokémon that often travels by summoning a golden board that it surfs on.
Gholdengo Sāfugō (サーフゴー) (1000)	Steel / Ghost	Gimmighoul (#999)	—N/a	
Wo-Chien Chionjen (チオンジェン) (1001)	Dark / Grass	No evolution		Wo-Chien, Chien-Pao, Ting-Lu, and Chi-Yu are a group of four Legendary Pokémon which appear in Pokémon Scarlet and Violet. The four were trapped in shrines due to their rampage and destruction, requiring the player to seek out "stakes" that keep the shrine sealed in order for the player to encounter the four. Wo-Chien is a snail-like Pokémon composed of a moss-like substance, with a "shell" of numerous wooden tablets on its back. In the game's lore, the tablets are said to contain the misdeeds of the Paldean King from a thousand years ago, with the writer's grudge causing Wo-Chien to be given life. It can drain the life force of plants, leading to areas surrounding it becoming barren of life. Chien-Pao is a snow leopard x Smilodon hybrid like Pokémon composed of snow and ice which has the broken halves of a sword acting as fangs. In the game's lore, the hatred of those slain by the sword caused Chien-Pao to be given life. It can control snow and plays on top of avalanches it causes. Ting-Lu is a deer or moose-like Pokémon composed of rock, with a jade-like vessel adorned on top of its head. In the game's lore, it's said that the fear humanity harbored for millennia was what caused Ting-Lu to be given life. It is strong enough to create fissures 160-feet deep. Chi-Yu is a goldfish-like Pokémon composed of fire. It has beads adorned around its eyes. In the game's lore, the beads are said to be filled with the envy of those who wanted to have them. Chi-Yu's body is capable of producing flames hot enough to melt rock.
Chien-Pao Paojian (パオジアン) (1002)	Dark / Ice	No evolution		
Ting-Lu Dinrū (ディンルー) (1003)	Dark / Ground	No evolution		
Chi-Yu Īyui (イーユイ) (1004)	Dark / Fire	No evolution		
Roaring Moon Todorokutsuki (トドロクツキ) (1005)	Dragon / Dark	No evolution		Roaring Moon and Iron Valiant are Paradox Pokémon – Pokémon which hail from different time periods than normal Pokémon – which appear in Pokémon Scarlet and Violet. Roaring Moon hails from the distant past, while Iron Valiant hails from the distant future. They are stated to hail from alternative realities in the DLC expansion for the game, The Indigo Disk. Roaring Moon is an ancient Paradox Pokémon resembling the Pokémon Salamence, a draconic Pokémon. It notably appears similar to Salamence's Mega Evolved form. Iron Valiant is a futuristic Paradox Pokémon resembling the Pokémon Gallade and Gardevoir, a pair of humanoid Pokémon.
Iron Valiant Tetsunobujin (テツノブジン) (1006)	Fairy / Fighting	No evolution		
Koraidon (コライドン) (1007)	Fighting / Dragon	No evolution		Koraidon and Miraidon are Legendary Pokémon that serve as the mascots of Pokémon Scarlet and Pokémon Violet, respectively. They are Paradox Pokémon, with Koraidon hailing from the past and Miraidon from the future. They both resemble Cyclizar. A specific Koraidon or Miraidon, depending on the player's version, serves as a major supporting character in-game. It is in a weakened state, and serves as the player's mount. It regains power throughout the game, and after defeating the games' final boss, the player will gain the ability to use the respective Pokémon in battle. Koraidon and Miraidon have additional forms, which are used for riding, gliding, and swimming. Another specific Koraidon or Miraidon, depending on the version, serves as an antagonist. It is aggressive, having defeated the player's Koraidon or Miraidon in a territorial struggle before the events of the games. It is eventually used in the final battle by the Professor's AI duplicates, and can be captured after defeating them. Their names hail from "Korai" and "Mirai", which mean past and future in Japanese, with the -don suffix being a reference to dinosaurs. Koraidon and Miraidon's character development and growth throughout the story of Scarlet and Violet has been praised.
Miraidon (ミライドン) (1008)	Electric / Dragon	No evolution		
Walking Wake Uneruminamo (ウネルミナモ) (1009)	Water / Dragon	No evolution		Walking Wake and Iron Leaves are Paradox Pokémon – Pokémon which hail from different time periods than normal Pokémon – which appear in Pokémon Scarlet and Violet. Walking Wake hails from the distant past, while Iron Leaves hails from the distant future. They are stated to hail from alternative realities in the DLC expansion for the game, The Indigo Disk. The pair were first announced as part of an event where players could battle one of the pair in special Tera raid battles depending on their version of the game. The event was later rerun multiple times. Walking Wake is an ancient Paradox Pokémon resembling the Pokémon Suicune, a Legendary Pokémon which first appeared in Pokémon Gold and Silver. Iron Leaves is a futuristic Paradox Pokémon which resembles Virizion, a Legendary Pokémon which first appeared in Pokémon Black and White.
Iron Leaves Tetsunoisaha (テツノイサハ) (1010)	Grass / Psychic	No evolution		
Dipplin Kamitchu (カミッチュ) (1011)	Grass / Dragon	Applin (#840)	Hydrapple (#1019)	Dipplin consists of two worm-like Pokémon inhabiting a large syrupy apple resembling a candy apple, which debuted in "The Teal Mask" DLC in Pokémon Scarlet and Violet. It evolves from Applin, a worm-like Pokémon that inhabits an apple, which debuted in Pokémon Sword and Shield. Dipplin evolves into Hydrapple.
Poltchageist Chadesu (チャデス) (1012)	Grass / Ghost	—N/a	Sinistcha (#1013)	Poltchageist is a matcha-like Pokémon that debuted in "The Teal Mask" DLC in Pokémon Scarlet and Violet. It was announced on August 22, 2023, through a trailer entailing a ghost story. According to Poltchageist's tale, it was created by a shunned tea master due to the master's strict lessons, with Poltchageist being created shortly after his death. Poltchageist uses its matcha to suck the life force of its victims. It bears similarities to Sinistea, which debuted in Pokémon Sword and Shield, but is a different species without biological association to Sinistea, their similarities likely a result of convergent evolution. It evolves into Sinistcha, which bears similarities to Polteageist, Sinistea's evolution.
Sinistcha Yabasocha (ヤバソチャ) (1013)	Grass / Ghost	Poltchageist (#1012)	—N/a	
Okidogi Iineinu (イイネイヌ) (1014)	Poison / Fighting	No evolution		Okidogi, Munkidori, and Fezandipiti are a trio of Legendary Pokémon. The three appear to reference the legend of Momotarō, as the three resemble the animals in the tale: Okidogi is a dog, Munkidori a monkey, and Fezandipiti a pheasant. In the region of Kitakami, the three are worshipped as "defenders" and dubbed the "Loyal Three" which protected them from the "ogre" Ogerpon. It is later revealed via a plot twist that the three were the attackers, and not Ogerpon. Pecharunt is stated to have bound them via a spell to obey it, and it ordered the three to steal Ogerpon's masks to satiate the desires of its foster parents. Ogerpon retaliated, killing the three. During the plot of The Teal Mask DLC for Pokémon Scarlet and Violet, they must be defeated by the player to get Ogerpon's masks back.
Munkidori Mashimashira (マシマシラ) (1015)	Poison / Psychic	No evolution		
Fezandipiti Kichikigisu (キチキギス) (1016)	Poison / Fairy	No evolution		
Ogerpon Ōgapon (オーガポン) (1017)	Grass	No evolution		Ogerpon is a mask-wearing Legendary Pokémon that debuted in "The Teal Mask" DLC in Pokémon Scarlet and Violet. It appears to be based on the oni in the legend of Momotarō. Ogerpon has multiple masks, which were made for it and its human friend by a kind mask maker in the distant past in order to disguise their appearances from the hostile people of Kitakami. The Loyal Three and Pecharunt sought to obtain the masks, but after they killed Ogerpon's friend while he was defending Ogerpon, Ogerpon killed them in retaliation. The battle led to Ogerpon being shunned as an evil being by the people of Kitakami. Ogerpon is idolized by the young boy Kieran, and the player's capture of Ogerpon angers Kieran to a point that he grows distant from them and his sister, Carmine. When Terastallized, Ogerpon can adopt a unique form depending on the Mask it holds.
Ogerpon Ōgapon (オーガポン) (1017)	Grass / Water	No evolution		Wellspring Ogerpon is the form Ogerpon takes while holding one of its masks, the Wellspring Mask. This changes Ogerpon's typing, and further changes its form when Terastallized.
Ogerpon Ōgapon (オーガポン) (1017)	Grass / Fire	No evolution		Hearthflame Ogerpon is the form Ogerpon takes while holding one of its masks, the Hearthflame Mask. This changes Ogerpon's typing, and further changes its form when Terastallized.
Ogerpon Ōgapon (オーガポン) (1017)	Grass / Rock	No evolution		Cornerstone Ogerpon is the form Ogerpon takes while holding one of its masks, the Cornerstone Mask. This changes Ogerpon's typing, and further changes its form when Terastallized.
Archaludon Burijurasu (ブリジュラス) (1018)	Steel / Dragon	Duraludon (#884)	—N/a	Archaludon is a bridge-like dragon Pokémon that debuted in The Indigo Disk DLC expansion in Pokémon Scarlet and Violet. It is the evolution of Duraludon, a Pokémon introduced in Pokémon Sword and Shield.
Hydrapple Kamitsuorochi (カミツオロチ) (1019)	Grass / Dragon	Dipplin (#1011)	—N/a	Hydrapple is the evolution of Dipplin, which was released as part of The Indigo Disk DLC expansion in Pokémon Scarlet and Violet. It is composed of seven individual serpentine Pokémon called "syrpents" inhabiting a large syrupy apple.
Gouging Fire Ugatsuhomura (ウガツホムラ) (1020)	Fire / Dragon	No evolution		Gouging Fire, Raging Bolt, Iron Boulder, and Iron Crown are Paradox Pokémon – Pokémon which hail from different time periods than normal Pokémon – which appear in Pokémon Scarlet and Violet. Gouging Fire and Raging Bolt hail from the distant past, while Iron Boulder and Iron Crown hail from the distant future. They are stated to hail from alternative realities in the DLC expansion for the game, The Indigo Disk. Gouging Fire and Raging Bolt are ancient Paradox Pokémon resembling the Pokémon Entei and Raikou, Legendary Pokémon which first appeared in Pokémon Gold and Silver. Iron Boulder and Iron Crown are futuristic Paradox Pokémon which resemble Terrakion and Cobalion, Legendary Pokémon which first appeared in Pokémon Black and White.
Raging Bolt Takeruraiko (タケルライコ) (1021)	Electric / Dragon	No evolution		
Iron Boulder Tetsunoiwao (テツノイワオ) (1022)	Rock / Psychic	No evolution		
Iron Crown Tetsunokashira (テツノカシラ) (1023)	Steel / Psychic	No evolution		
Terapagos Terapagosu (テラパゴス) (1024)	Normal	No evolution		Terapagos is a turtle-like Legendary Pokémon that debuted in "The Indigo Disk" DLC in Pokémon Scarlet and Violet. It is believed in-universe to have a special tie to the Terastal phenomenon, and can manipulate Terastal energy in-battle. It appears in three forms: a smaller "Normal Form", an in-battle "Terastal Form", and a more powerful form it uses when Terastallized known as the "Stellar Form". When encountered and caught, it unlocks a new Tera Type called "Stellar". A Terapagos appears in the anime series Pokémon Horizons: The Series, where it plays a major role.
Pecharunt Momowarō (モモワロウ) (1025)	Poison / Ghost	No evolution		Pecharunt is a peach-like Mythical Pokémon that debuted in a special, timed exclusive event Pokémon Scarlet and Violet. Pecharunt is based on the legend of Momotarō, with Pecharunt's purple peach-like appearance being based on the titular character. Pecharunt, like Momotarō, was raised from a peach by two elderly people. Pecharunt highly enjoyed their praise, and it fed them some of its mochi, which corrupted the elderly people and made them greedy. They had Pecharunt retrieve things for their desires, eventually leading to Pecharunt being told to steal Ogerpon's masks. Pecharunt went on a journey, recruiting Okidogi, Munkidori, and Fezandipiti in the process, eventually arriving in Kitakami. While stealing the masks, they accidentally killed Ogerpon's friend, leading to Ogerpon attacking in retaliation. While its companions were killed, Pecharunt was sent into dormancy by the attack. It reawakens during the events of the story, using its mochi to mind control the people of Kitakami to do its bidding before being captured by the player.

=== Paldean Forms ===
List of Paldean Pokémon forms introduced in Generation IX (2022)
Name	Type(s)	Evolves from	Evolves into	Notes
Tauros Kentarosu (ケンタロス) (0128)	Fighting	No evolution		This form of Tauros is known as "Combat Breed" Paldean Tauros. It and its other forms are believed to be inspired by bullfighting and the Osborne bull, a popular form of iconography depicting a bull. James Turner designed all three forms of Paldean Tauros.
Tauros Kentarosu (ケンタロス) (0128)	Fighting / Fire	No evolution		This form of Tauros is known as "Blaze Breed" Paldean Tauros, and is only able to be captured in Pokémon Scarlet. It gains an additional "Fire" typing.
Tauros Kentarosu (ケンタロス) (0128)	Fighting / Water	No evolution		This form of Tauros is known as "Aqua Breed" Paldean Tauros, and is only able to be captured in Pokémon Violet. It gains an additional "Water" typing.
Wooper Upā (ウパー) (0194)	Poison / Ground	—N/a	Clodsire (#980)	Wooper is based on an axolotl. Unlike its counterpart from Johto, it is a Poison and Ground-type. Paldean Wooper was praised for its cute design, being affectionately nicknamed "Pooper" by fans.

=== Mega-Evolved Forms ===
List of Mega-Evolved Forms introduced in Generation IX (2025)
Name	Type(s)	Evolves from	Evolves into	Notes
Mega Raichu Raichū (ライチュウ) (0026)	Electric	Raichu (#026)	—N/a	Mega Raichu X and Y are the Mega Evolved forms of Raichu, a Pokémon who first appeared in the 1996 games Pokémon Red and Blue.Similar to Charizard and Mewtwo, Raichu received two Mega Evolutions in the form of Mega Raichu X and Mega Raichu Y. Both forms resemble their respective letter. Mega Raichu X gains a second tail, and the electromagnetism of both allows it to float in the air. Mega Raichu Y has gained additional electrical power, which it uses to unleash instantaneous power. It has gained a combative temperament as a result.
Mega Clefable Pikushī (ピクシー) (0036)	Fairy / Flying	Clefable (#036)	—N/a	Mega Clefable is the Mega Evolved form of Clefable, a Pokémon that debuted in the 1996 games Pokémon Red and Blue. Mega Clefable gains large pink wings made of moonlight, though it does not use them to fly, instead levitating.
Mega Victreebel Utsubotto (ウツボット) (0071)	Grass / Poison	Victreebel (#071)	—N/a	Mega Victreebel is the Mega Evolved form of Victreebel, a Pokémon that debuted in the 1996 games Pokémon Red and Blue. Mega Victreebel has so much acid within its body that it uses its vine to constrict its throat and stop the acid from overflowing from its mouth.
Mega Starmie Sutāmī (スターミー) (0121)	Water / Psychic	Starmie (#121)	—N/a	Mega Starmie is the Mega Evolved form of Starmie, a Pokémon that debuted in the 1996 games Pokémon Red and Blue. Mega Starmie looks identical to base Starmie, but gains two human-like legs which it can use to run around.
Mega Dragonite Kairyū (カイリュー) (0149)	Dragon / Flying	Dragonite (#149)	—N/a	Mega Dragonite is the Mega Evolved form of Dragonite, a Pokémon that debuted in the 1996 games Pokémon Red and Blue. Unlike regular Dragonite, Mega Dragonite incorporates several design aspects similar to Dragonair, a Pokémon which evolves into Dragonite. These aspects include wings on Dragonite's head and a pearl on its tail.
Mega Meganium Meganium (メガニウム) (0154)	Grass / Fairy	Meganium (#154)	—N/a	Mega Meganium is the Mega Evolved form of Meganium, a Pokémon which first appeared in the 1999 games Pokémon Gold and Silver. Several more flowers sprout from Mega Meganium's neck.
Mega Feraligatr Ōdairu (オーダイル) (0160)	Water / Dragon	Feraligatr (#160)	—N/a	Mega Feraligatr is the Mega Evolved form of Feraligatr, a Pokémon which first appeared in the 1999 games Pokémon Gold and Silver. Mega Feraligatr gains a large red helmet that closes down on its spiked arms. These combine to form a more powerful set of jaws and it is similar to Totodile.
Mega Skarmory Eāmudo (エアームド) (0227)	Steel / Flying	Skarmory (#227)	—N/a	Mega Skarmory is the Mega Evolved form of Skarmory, a Pokémon which first appeared in the 1999 games Pokémon Gold and Silver. Mega Skarmory becomes gold and gains a more "fierce demeanor".
Mega Chimecho Chirīn (チリーン) (0358)	Psychic / Steel	Chimecho (#358)	—N/a	Mega Chimecho is the Mega Evolved form of Chimecho, a Pokémon which first appeared in the 2002 games Pokémon Ruby and Sapphire. Mega Chimecho six smaller copies of itself appear, and when it makes sound, the copies resonate with Mega Chimecho and power up its attacks.
Mega Absol Z Abusoru (アブソル) (0359)	Dark / Ghost	Absol (#359)	—N/a	Mega Absol Z is the Mega Evolved form of Absol, a Pokémon which debuted in the 2002 games Pokémon Ruby and Sapphire. It is the second form of Mega Absol, which debuted in the 2013 games Pokémon X and Y. Mega Absol Z has a more ghostly appearance compared to Mega Absol.
Mega Staraptor Mukuhōku (ムクホーク) (0398)	Fighting / Flying	Staraptor (#398)	—N/a	Mega Staraptor is the Mega Evolved form of Staraptor, a Pokémon which debuted in the 2006 games Pokémon Diamond and Pearl. Mega Staraptor gains a lighter coloration and its design changes to more greatly resemble a raptor. They are known for being top-class fliers with increased strength to effortlessly lift heavy Pokémon up to and including Steelix off the ground.
Mega Garchomp Z Gaburiasu (ガブリアス) (0445)	Dragon	Garchomp (#445)	—N/a	Mega Garchomp Z is the Mega Evolved form of Garchomp, a Pokémon which debuted in the 2006 games Pokémon Diamond and Pearl. It is the second form of Mega Garchomp, a Pokémon which debuted in the 2013 games Pokémon X and Y. Mega Garchomp Z's blades on its body get substantially larger and more intimidating.
Mega Lucario Z Rukario (ルカリオ) (0448)	Fighting / Steel	Lucario (#448)	—N/a	Mega Lucario Z is the Mega Evolved form of Lucario, a Pokemon which first appeared in the 2005 film Pokémon: Lucario and the Mystery of Mew. Mega Lucario Z is Lucario's second Mega Evolved form, following the original Mega Lucario that debuted in the 2013 games Pokémon X and Y. Unlike Mega Lucario, Mega Lucario Z uses its aura to create a defensive barrier around itself that increases its durability and flexibility.
Mega Froslass Yukimenoko (ユキメノコ) (0478)	Ice / Ghost	Froslass (#478)	—N/a	Mega Froslass is the Mega Evolved form of Froslass, a Pokémon which first appeared in the 2006 games Pokémon Diamond and Pearl. Mega Froslass grows significantly taller, resembling an ice maiden wearing a kimono.
Mega Heatran Hīdoran (ヒードラン) (0485)	Fire / Steel	Heatran (#485)	—N/a	Mega Heatran is the Mega Evolved form of Heatran, a Pokémon which debuted in the 2006 games Pokémon Diamond and Pearl. Lava spills over Mega Heatran's body as its mouth hangs wide open, resembling a volcano.
Mega Darkrai Dākurai (ダークライ) (0491)	Dark	Darkrai (#491)	—N/a	Mega Darkrai is the Mega Evolved form of Darkrai, a Pokémon which debuted in the 2006 games Pokémon Diamond and Pearl. Mega Darkrai is more blimp-like in appearance than Darkrai, gaining a large eye that Darkrai's head can emerge from.
Mega Emboar Enbuō (エンブオー) (0500)	Fire / Fighting	Emboar (#500)	—N/a	Mega Emboar is the Mega Evolved form of Emboar, a Pokémon which first appeared in the 2010 games Pokémon Black and White. Mega Emboar's hair is now in the shape of a crown, and it wields a spear made of fire. Its appearance is inspired by Zhang Fei and overall resembles a warrior of the Three Kingdoms.
Mega Excadrill Doryūzu (ドリュウズ) (0530)	Ground / Steel	Excadrill (#530)	—N/a	Mega Excadrill is the Mega Evolved form of Excadrill, a Pokémon which first appeared in the 2010 games Pokémon Black and White. Mega Excadrill's drill-like appendages grow significantly larger, and can combine to form a much larger drill.
Mega Scolipede Pendorā (ペンドラー) (0545)	Bug / Poison	Scolipede (#545)	—N/a	Mega Scolipede is the Mega Evolved form of Scolipede, a Pokémon which first appeared in the 2010 games Pokémon Black and White. Mega Scolipede gains a layer of armor, with its antennae becoming larger and more venomous.
Mega Scrafty Zuruzukin (ズルズキン) (0560)	Dark / Fighting	Scrafty (#560)	—N/a	Mega Scrafty is the Mega Evolved form of Scrafty, a Pokémon which first appeared in the 2010 games Pokémon Black and White. Scrafty gains white cloth around its body, which is stated to be its own shed skin.
Mega Eelektross Shibirudon (シビルドン) (0604)	Electric	Eelektross (#604)	—N/a	Mega Eelektross is the Mega Evolved form of Eelektross, a Pokémon which first appeared in the 2010 games Pokémon Black and White. Mega Eelektross gains two new fish-like appendages called "false Eelektrik" made out of mucus.
Mega Chandelure Shandera (シャンデラ) (0609)	Ghost / Fire	Chandelure (#609)	—N/a	Mega Chandelure is the Mega Evolved form of Chandelure, a Pokémon which first appeared in the 2010 games Pokémon Black and White. Mega Chandelure resembles a more extravagant chandelier. One of its two eyes links directly to the afterlife, and Mega Chandelure can draw in hatred to convert into power.
Mega Golurk Gorūgu (ゴルーグ) (0623)	Ground / Ghost	Golurk (#623)	—N/a	Mega Golurk is the Mega Evolved form of Golurk, a Pokémon which debuted in the 2010 games Pokémon Black and White. Energy flows around Mega Golurk's body, with Golurk gaining two ghostly wing-like constructs on its back.
Mega Chesnaught Burigaron (ブリガロン) (0652)	Grass / Fighting	Chesnaught (#652)	—N/a	Mega Chesnaught is the Mega Evolved form of Chesnaught, a Pokémon which first appeared in the 2013 games Pokémon X and Y. Mega Chesnaught gains a more regal look, including gaining a cape. It has large shoulder pauldrons it can detach and attack enemies with.
Mega Delphox Mafokushī (マフォクシー) (0655)	Fire / Psychic	Delphox (#655)	—N/a	Mega Delphox is the Mega Evolved form of Delphox, a Pokémon which first appeared in the 2013 games Pokémon X and Y. Mega Delphox gains three flaming broomsticks it uses as weapons, including one that it rides around on.
Mega Greninja Gekkōga (ゲッコウガ) (0658)	Water / Dark	Greninja (#658)	—N/a	Mega Greninja is the Mega Evolved form of Greninja, a Pokémon which first appeared in the 2013 games Pokémon X and Y. Mega Greninja hangs upside down on a shuriken made of its own mucus, and uses its tongue to trap opponents.
Mega Pyroar Kaenjishi (カエンジシ) (0668)	Fire / Normal	Pyroar (#668)	—N/a	Mega Pyroar is the Mega Evolved form of Pyroar, a Pokémon which first appeared in the 2013 games Pokémon X and Y. Mega Pyroar's mane grows significantly larger when it Mega Evolves.
Mega Floette Furaette (フラエッテ) (0670)	Fairy	Floette (#670)	—N/a	Mega Floette is the Mega Evolved form of Floette, a Pokémon which first appeared in the 2013 games Pokémon X and Y. Regular Floette cannot Mega Evolve, with only a special Floette owned by the character AZ being capable of Mega Evolution.
Mega Meowstic Nyaonikusu (ニャオニクス) (0678)	Psychic	Meowstic (#678)	—N/a	Mega Meowstic is the Mega Evolved form of Meowstic, a Pokémon which debuted in the 2013 games Pokémon X and Y. Mega Meowstic blends the color scheme and design aspects of both the male and female forms of the original Meowstic.
Mega Malamar Karamanero (カラマネロ) (0687)	Dark / Psychic	Malamar (#687)	—N/a	Mega Malamar is the Mega Evolved form of Malamar, a Pokémon which first appeared in the 2013 games Pokémon X and Y. Mega Malamar has a significantly larger brain, which grants it stronger hypnotic abilities. These abilities let Malamar rewrite people's personalities and memories, changing them into completely different people if it wishes.
Mega Barbaracle Gamenodesu (ガメノデス) (0689)	Rock / Fighting	Barbaracle (#689)	—N/a	Mega Barbaracle is the Mega Evolved form of Barbaracle, a Pokémon which first appeared in the 2013 games Pokémon X and Y. It gains substantially more arms and becomes more visually intimidating.
Mega Dragalge Doramidoro (ドラミドロ) (0691)	Poison / Dragon	Dragalge (#691)	—N/a	Mega Dragalge is the Mega Evolved form of Dragalge, a Pokémon which first appeared in the 2013 games Pokémon X and Y. Mega Dragalge's head protrusions grow much longer, and it gains bulbs on its head resembling antlers.
Mega Hawlucha Ruchaburu (ルチャブル) (0701)	Fighting / Flying	Hawlucha (#701)	—N/a	Mega Hawlucha is the Mega Evolved form of Hawlucha, a Pokémon which first appeared in the 2013 games Pokémon X and Y. Mega Hawlucha has a golden cape and chest piece. It uses its muscles to tank hits from its opponents. The Mega Evolution was revealed in a short film on August 28, 2025, showing of a matchup between it and a Machamp.
Mega Zygarde Jigarude (ジガルデ) (0718)	Dragon / Ground	Zygarde (#718)	—N/a	Mega Zygarde is the Mega Evolved form of Zygarde, a Pokémon which first appeared in the 2013 games Pokémon X and Y. Zygarde can only Mega Evolve in its "Complete Forme". Mega Zygarde's body changes, gaining a massive cannon above its head. When it Mega Evolves, it gains the special move Nihil Light, an upgraded version of Core Enforcer which it can only use while Mega Evolved.
Mega Crabominable Kekenkani (ケケンカニ) (0740)	Fighting / Ice	Crabominable (#740)	—N/a	Mega Crabominable is the Mega Evolved form of Crabominable, a Pokémon which debuted in the 2016 games Pokémon Sun and Moon. Mega Crabominable gains long feet covered in ice.
Mega Golisopod Gusokumusha (グソクムシャ) (0768)	Bug / Steel	Golisopod (#768)	—N/a	Mega Golisopod is the Mega Evolved form of Golisopod, a Pokémon which debuted in the 2016 games Pokémon Sun and Moon.
Mega Drampa Jijīron (ジジーロン) (0780)	Normal / Dragon	Drampa (#780)	—N/a	Mega Drampa is the Mega Evolved form of Drampa, a Pokémon which first appeared in the 2016 games Pokémon Sun and Moon. Mega Drampa's body changes to resemble a thundercloud, and gains the ability to manipulate the atmosphere. The Mega Evolution allows Mega Drampa to regain its youth, granting it more power.
Mega Magearna Magiana (マギアナ) (0801)	Steel / Fairy	Magearna (#801)	—N/a	Mega Magearna is the Mega Evolved form of Magearna, a Pokémon which debuted in the 2016 film Pokémon the Movie: Volcanion and the Mechanical Marvel. Mega Magearna's skirt changes design and it gains two large gears around its body. Depending on Magearna's form, the color scheme of the Mega Evolution changes.
Mega Zeraora Zeraora (ゼラオラ) (0807)	Electric	Zeraora (#807)	—N/a	Mega Zeraora is the Mega Evolved form of Zeraora, a Pokémon which first appeared in the 2017 games Pokémon Ultra Sun and Ultra Moon. Its color scheme changes from primarily yellow to primarily black, with protrusions on its body that concentrate electric energy and emit a blue light. The electric energy in its body is the equivalent of ten bolts of lightning.
Mega Falinks Tairētsu (タイレーツ) (0870)	Fighting	Falinks (#870)	—N/a	Mega Falinks is the Mega Evolved form of Falinks, a Pokémon which first appeared in the 2019 games Pokémon Sword and Shield. The six members of Mega Falinks work together to attain a form resembling a bipedal swordsman.
Mega Scovillain Sukoviran (スコヴィラン) (0952)	Grass / Fire	Scovillain (#952)	—N/a	Mega Scovillain is the Mega Evolved form of Scovillain, a Pokémon which debuted in the 2022 games Pokémon Scarlet and Violet. Scovillain's twin heads change to resemble dinosaurs, and also incorporates elements of Scovillain's prior evolutionary stage, Capsakid.
Mega Glimmora Kirafuroru (キラフロル) (0970)	Rock / Poison	Glimmora (#970)	—N/a	Mega Glimmora is the Mega Evolved form of Glimmora, a Pokémon which debuted in the 2022 games Pokémon Scarlet and Violet. Mega Glimmora's greatly resembles an open flower, with its cone-shaped head becoming significantly longer and pointier.
Mega Tatsugiri Sharitatsu (シャリタツ) (0978)	Dragon / Water	Tatsugiri (#978)	—N/a	Mega Tatsugiri is the Mega Evolved form of Tatsugiri, a Pokémon which debuted in the 2022 games Pokémon Scarlet and Violet. Mega Tatsugiri resembles a plate of sushi, with all three forms of Tatsugiri placed on a rainbow-colored object. The design of Mega Tatsugiri changes depending on which form of Tatsugiri undergoes Mega Evolution.
Mega Baxcalibur Segureibu (セグレイブ) (0998)	Dragon / Ice	Baxcalibur (#998)	—N/a	Mega Baxcalibur is the Mega Evolved form of Baxcalibur, a Pokémon which first appeared in the 2022 games Pokémon Scarlet and Violet. The blade on Baxcalibur's back has grown substantially larger, allowing it to cleave through nearly anything in its path.

== Reception ==
The designs of many of the Pokémon have received criticism since Scarlet and Violet's release. Some fans of the series responded negatively to many designs from the games when the games were leaked prior to release. Stacey Henley, writing for TheGamer, criticized the designs of the Pokémon in the game. Though she found several of the designs to be of a high standard, such as Skeledirge, Dachsbun, Pawmot, and Finizen, she felt that the majority of the designs in the game were not up to the standard of other entries in the series. Ben Sledge, also writing for TheGamer, additionally criticized the generation's Legendary Pokémon designs as being uninspired or unappealing, stating that "They're barely even creatures, they're just animals with weird colour palettes."

Joe Parlock of TheGamer praised the sleek designs of the starters and the designs of several other Pokémon, including Smoliv, Fidough, Koraidon, and Miraidon. He described the individuality of the designs and how each of the designs helped build Paldea's culture, stating that it was "the most holistic approach to Pokémon design we've seen in decades." In a discussion among Nintendo Life staff about the best designs in the generation, the group highlighted many Pokémon, including Glimmora, Tandemaus, and Charcadet. Writer Kate Gray praised the "weirder" designs of generation IX, including Tandemaus and several species based around the concept of convergent evolution, while writer Alan Hagues thought that many of the middle and final evolutions had appealing designs, and that the generation overall had simple yet strong art design. Numerous individual designs have had their designs positively highlighted by critics, such as Grafaiai, Greavard, Quaquaval, Fidough, and Lechonk. Several designs have also been described as being popular with the LGBTQ+ community, such as Quaquaval. Dod Seitz of TheGamer additionally described the queer positivity of designs such as Quaquaval and Maushold, also expressing how Iron Valiant served as a positive example of an androgynous or non-binary character design.

Ana Diaz, writing for Polygon, believed that many species, most notably Flamigo, Palafin, and Maushold, had unique and powerful traits in gameplay. She hoped that they would allow for a more fun competitive environment for players. Several Pokémon, such as Annihilape, Palafin, Flutter Mane, Iron Bundle, and Houndstone, ended up being particularly powerful in popular fan-run competitive formats. This led to them being banned from standard competitive formats, with their use only being allowed in more restricted ones.
