= Pokémon Concierge =

2023 Japanese animated television series

- Promotional poster
- Genre: Adventure; Fantasy; Comedy
- Based on: Pokémon by The Pokémon Company
- Written by: Harumi Doki
- Directed by: Iku Ogawa
- Countries of origin: Japan; United States
- Original languages: Japanese; English
- No. of seasons: 1
- No. of episodes: 8

Production
- Running time: 14–20 minutes
- Production companies: The Pokémon Company; Dwarf Studios

Original release
- Network: Netflix
- Release: December 28, 2023 – September 4, 2025

Pokémon Concierge is a stop-motion original net animation (ONA) series, part of The Pokémon Company's Pokémon media franchise, that premiered on Netflix on December 28, 2023. The series focuses on a woman named Haru, who is down on her luck and visits a resort known as the Pokémon Resort. She becomes a concierge, working on the island in order to care for its Pokémon visitors.

The series was created following discussions between Netflix and The Pokémon Company in 2019, and spent the next several years in development. The series received positive reviews from critics, who praised the series' animation, themes, messages, and relaxing atmosphere. In February 2024, Netflix announced that further episodes were in production. The second part released on September 4, 2025.

== Cast and characters ==
- Haru (ハル) is a down-on-her-luck, workaholic woman who arrives at the Pokémon Resort to work there as a concierge. Haru lacks confidence in herself, and grows more confident as the series progresses. Haru is voiced by Rena Nōnen in Japanese and by Karen Fukuhara in English.
- Alisa (アリサ, Arisa) is a woman who works part-time at the Pokémon Resort. Alisa is voiced by Fairouz Ai in Japanese and by Imani Hakim in English.
- Tyler (タイラ, Taira) is a man who helps with sanitation and catering at the Resort. He also hosts fitness lessons. Tyler is voiced by Eita Okuno (奥野 瑛太) in Japanese and by Josh Keaton in English.
- Ms. Watanabe (ワタナベ) is the island's supervisor, and the boss of Haru. Ms. Watanabe is voiced by Yoshiko Takemura (竹村 叔子) in Japanese and by Lori Alan in English.

Singers Mariya Takeuchi and Tatsuro Yamashita additionally sang the series' theme songs, "Have a Good Time Here" and “ONOMATOPE ISLAND”, respectively.

== Production ==
Discussions with Netflix to produce a Pokémon series began in 2019 while The Pokémon Company was working on the film Detective Pikachu. The Pokémon Company's Hidenaga Katakami stated the series was initially discussed to be produced in 2-D animation. An animator working for Netflix Japan suggested using stop motion animation, due to prior collaboration between Netflix and Dwarf Studios, which was accepted. The series is written by Harumi Doki.

The series uses stop motion animation, resulting in over 80,000 unique frames for the four episodes. Individual animators were capable of making up to 5 seconds of footage each day, with episode run times lasting between 14 and 20 minutes. Tadahiro Uesugi created the concept design for the Pokémon Resort and designed the major human characters such as Haru. Uesugi stated that he wanted for people to look at the series art style and say "That looks fun." He additionally stated he wished to balance the feeling of being in the Pokémon world with an aspect of surprise. The production team paid heavy attention to detail with the series, creating 30 facial expressions for Haru in order for her to convey a wider range of emotions. Ikue Ogawa, the series' director, focused on how characters would move in the series in order to add realism to the world. The production team made sure to include many details in the background of the series in order to encourage rewatches of the series. Various design aspects referencing other Pokémon species were also included in the background of shots, such as a pillow resembling Gorebyss.

Katakami stated that there were no plans during development for Pokémon Concierge to tie into the wider Pokémon universe, with the focus being on Haru and her development, though Katakami stated they did design the environment to be feasibly capable of existing within the wider Pokémon universe. Pokémon battles, a major mechanic in the Pokémon video games, were excluded from the show, with the production team deciding to focus on the day-to-day life of Pokémon. Psyduck was decided to be a good match for Haru's personality, and other Pokémon that would feature in the series were considered after that. The team got insights from people who had grown up with the franchise in order to decide how the Pokémon would act and which would feature in the show. 29 species of Pokémon were selected to appear in the show, as well as the four main human characters. Iku Ogawa, who produced the series, helped with making background characters, as well as several other Pokémon. Ogawa stated that Psyduck was the first Pokémon he created for the series. Psyduck was given a "dopey" form of movement, with several needless movements included in order to emphasize its personality. The most difficult Pokémon to design was Pikachu due to Ogawa wishing to make sure its design had no mistakes in comparison to its design in wider expanded media for the franchise. Pikachu's distinct negative personality in the series was decided by Ogawa, who was inspired by how dogs and other pets tended to have different individual personalities.

In February 2024, Netflix ordered more episodes of the series, with production continuing on the series. The second season was released in September 2025, adding four more episodes.

== Episodes ==
No.	Title	Original release date
1	"I’m Haru, the New Concierge!"; Transliteration: "I'm Supposed to Start Working Here Today!" (Japanese: 今日からこちらで働かせていただきます！)	December 28, 2023
Following several unfortunate events in her life, Haru decides to work at the Pokémon Resort as a concierge, an island paradise populated by Pokémon. There, she meets Watanabe, Tyler, and Alisa. Watanabe instructs Haru to experience the island as a guest for her first day. Haru falls asleep while relaxing on the island, and wakes up to find a Psyduck, though it runs off as it encounters her. Watanabe congratulates her for the experience and encourages her to befriend a Pokémon.
2	"What’s on Your Mind, Psyduck?"; Transliteration: "So, Were You Having Fun Just Now?" (Japanese: どう？いま楽しい？)	December 28, 2023
Haru is confused on how to complete Watanabe's assignment. Tyler takes Haru to perform fitness lessons, where they encounter Psyduck again. Tyler explains that Psyduck arrived several weeks ago, but is shy. Haru encounters Psyduck again while she is researching it, and accidentally knocks over Tyler while trying to interact with it. Tyler ends up dropping his berries as a result, and Haru goes to find more. After collecting more berries, she tumbles down a hill, where Psyduck helps Haru by stopping the berries from falling. Psyduck opens up to Haru, and the two bond.
3	"I Hope I Can Evolve Too…"; Transliteration: "I Want to Evolve Too, Right Now..." (Japanese: 私も早く進化したい…)	December 28, 2023
Haru wishes she could grow more, and sets about going through her weak points, but is interrupted by a Magikarp, who is unable to swim, having its floatie stolen by a Wingull. Haru gives chase, but Wingull drops the floatie, which gets crushed by a Snorlax. Haru is sad she cannot fix the floatie, but the Magikarp evolves into a Gyarados and swims away, no longer needing help to swim. Haru notices a Wooper playing with a new floatie she made, and she decides to start making toys for the island's Pokémon.
4	"Welcome to the Pokémon Resort!"; Transliteration: "Welcome to the Pokémon Resort!" (Japanese: ようこそポケモンリゾートへ！)	December 28, 2023
Haru meets a Pokémon trainer named Nao, who has come to the Pokémon Resort to give his Pikachu more confidence. Haru tries several activities, but they do not help Pikachu. Haru encourages Nao to let his Pikachu be itself. A thankful Nao leaves the resort with Pikachu. Haru breaks down after Alisa states that Haru has found herself, thanking Psyduck for helping her open up and be herself.
5	"A Pokémon to Help Me!"; Transliteration: "Pokémon Can Really Lend a Helping Hand!" (Japanese: ポケモンの手も借りたい！)	September 4, 2025
With Watanabe, Tyler, and Alisa occupied with their lives outside of the Pokémon Resort, Haru finds herself in charge while taking care of a Shinx and Luxray. While she is initially overwhelmed by all the work she has to do, she manages to get some of the Pokémon on the resort to assist her. The resort later loses power, and despite the efforts of Haru and the other Pokémon, she is unable to get it back on. However, the guests still find a way to have fun with their Pokémon in the dark. The next day, all of Haru's coworkers return and reward her for substituting for them.
6	"Is That Really the Best Option?"; Transliteration: "Is That Really the Best Option?" (Japanese: 一番のしあわせって)	September 4, 2025
Haru and the staff meet Tyler's uncle, Dan, who has arrived at the resort with his Sealeo. Despite Sealeo's cheerful demeanor, Dan has found it difficult to take care of her in the city due to her larger size after she evolved from the Spheal he met 15 years prior. After seeing how much fun Sealeo is having at the resort, Dan attempts to abandon her there on the next day before being stopped by the staff. He apologizes to Tyler and the rest, believing that having Sealeo would be better off at the Resort than in the city. Watanabe agrees that Sealeo can stay as long as Dan works there as a concierge, which he happily accepts.
7	"I'm a Role Model Now?"; Transliteration: "I'm a Role Model Now?" (Japanese: 先輩になりました？)	September 4, 2025
Haru is in charge of helping Dan on his first day as a concierge.
8	"Where I Belong"; Transliteration: "I Want to Stay Here Because This Is My Home" (Japanese: 今、私はここにいます)	September 4, 2025
Haru tries to help a trapped Eevee during the storm before she is rescued by Arcanine, who belongs to her ex-boyfriend Kent. Psyduck gets jealous when he watches Haru talking with Kent. The next day, Haru spends her time with Kent and his Arcanine in order to make sure they're having a great time at the Pokémon Resort. When Kent's Arcanine gets stuck inside a tube slide, Haru, with Psyduck's help, manages to get Arcanine out by tickling. A thankful Kent reconciles with Haru before leaving the resort with Arcanine the next day.

== Release and reception ==
=== Season one ===
In February 2023, during the Pokémon Day presentation, it was announced that a stop motion animated television series was in development for Netflix. The Pokémon Company collaborated with Dwarf Studios on the series. In July 2023, it was announced that Rena Nōnen would be voicing the main protagonist, Haru. In November 2023, a trailer was released, revealing the main Japanese and English voice cast. Pokémon Concierge premiered on Netflix on December 28, 2023. It consists of four episodes.

Pokémon Concierge received largely positive reviews from critics. On the review aggregator website Rotten Tomatoes, the series holds an approval rating of 100% based on 18 reviews, with an average rating of 7.4/10. The website's critics consensus reads, "Precious as a Pikachu, Pokémon Concierge is good clean fun for fans who prefer to see the pocket monsters' cuddlier side." Charles Pulliam-Moore, writing for The Verge, described the series as "one of the first times in years that the company's landed on something truly inspired," describing the focus on real life dread while also having a cheerful atmosphere and visuals allowed the series to appeal to both old and young viewers. He highlighted the series' focus on low-stakes episodes as enhancing the core themes of the series. Kenneth Shepard, writing for Kotaku, stated the low stakes of the series helped focus on the themes of friendship and cooperation the series entailed, additionally stating that it allowed the series to focus on aspects other than the Pokémon franchise's traditional focus on Pokémon battling. Shepard described Haru as being the soul of the show, with her interactions with the Pokémon in the series helping her to grow and develop away from her workaholic lifestyle. Shepard stated that while the series' short length made it feel disjointed at times, he believed the series helped focus on the personalities of the individual Pokémon species and franchise that had been lacking in previous Pokémon media.

Joshua Yehl, writing for IGN, praised the series for its stop-motion animations and its usage of the protagonist Haru to relate to millennials. He stated that its short run time helped emphasize the series' themes of relaxation while accomplishing the series' main message effectively. Ana Diaz, writing for Polygon, additionally praised the series' "cozy" atmosphere. She praised Haru's role in the series, with her growth to accept herself for who she is being described as a "welcome change of pace for the franchise." Reuben Baron, writing for Paste Magazine, praised the series' animation and messages. They praised the "feel good" vibes of the series and positive messages, but felt the show's small number of episodes hurt its ability to persist in the minds of its viewers following a viewing of the series. Surej Singh, writing for NME, believed the show helped capture the playful aspects of the Pokémon franchise that had been sidelined in prior media for the series. He stated that while Haru's arc with Psyduck was not overly complicated, he believed it to be calming for viewers. Singh additionally praised the voice acting and animation for the series, though he believed the small number of episodes to be a waste given the series' high quality.

Pokémon Concierge was nominated for an Annie Award for its second episode in the category "Best Direction- TV/Media."

=== Season two ===
Prior to the release of the season, promotional merchandise was released featuring Pokémon from the series. Psyduck wearing floatie rings were also added to spin-off game Pokémon Go as part of an in-game event celebrating the season's release.

Elijah Gonzalez, writing for The A.V. Club, praised the show's second season, highlighting its ability to be a lighthearted, cute series while still focusing on the struggles of adult life. Gonzalez additionally praised the show's visuals, but wished the series was longer. Angela Marrujo Fornaca, writing for Nintendojo, similarly praised the animation, moments featuring Psyduck, and the atmosphere, particularly highlighting how each episode had lessons that did not feel overly "preachy". However, she disliked the season's final episode, as she felt it did not justify why viewers should feel sympathy towards Kent. Anime News Network also praised the season's animation and lighthearted atmosphere, highlighting the season's focus on Haru helping other people in similar situations to her. However, they felt like the season was short and could have had more episodes.
