= The Hidden Treasure of Area Zero =

- Developer: Game Freak
- Publishers: JP: The Pokémon Company; WW: Nintendo
- Directors: Katsuhiko Ichiraku; Rei Murayama
- Producers: Shigeru Ohmori; Akira Kinashi; Shinya Saito; Toyokazu Nonaka; Takanori Sowa; Kenji Endo
- Designer: Rei Murayama
- Writer: Ryota Muranaka
- Composers: Minako Adachi; Go Ichinose; Rei Murayama; Hitomi Sato; Hiromitsu Maeba; Haruka Soeda; Toby Fox
- Series: Pokémon
- Platform: Nintendo Switch
- Release: WW: September 13, 2023; (The Teal Mask): WW: December 14, 2023; (The Indigo Disk): WW: January 11, 2024; (Epilogue)
- Genre: Role-playing
- Mode: Single-player

The Hidden Treasure of Area Zero is a two-part downloadable content expansion pack for the 2022 role-playing video games Pokémon Scarlet and Violet on Nintendo Switch. It is developed by Game Freak and published by The Pokémon Company and Nintendo for the Nintendo Switch.

The first part, The Teal Mask, was released on September 13, 2023, and the second part, The Indigo Disk, was released on December 14, 2023. An epilogue, Mochi Mayhem, was released on January 11, 2024.

The expansion pack's storyline introduced new Pokémon not featured in the base games, including new Legendary Pokémon Ogerpon, Fezandipiti, Munkidori, Okidogi, and Terapagos, who each serve as the focal Legendary Pokémon of The Teal Mask and The Indigo Disk, and a new Mythical Pokémon Pecharunt, which is the focus of the epilogue.

== Story ==
=== Part 1: The Teal Mask ===
The player is invited to participate in a student field trip to the land of Kitakami. Accompanied by Ms. Briar, a teacher guide from the sister school Blueberry Academy, the player travels to Kitakami and meets Carmine and her younger brother Kieran, two Blueberry Academy students native to Kitakami. The player is paired with Kieran and tasked with visiting three signs telling the story of "the Loyal Three". Many years ago, the ogre-like Pokémon Ogerpon, who was wearing the Teal Mask, attacked Kitakami, but three Pokémon named Okidogi, Munkidori, and Fezandipiti sacrificed themselves to defeat it. Ogerpon was never seen again, and the villagers buried the three Pokémon in a shrine, named them "the Loyal Three", and have since held an annual festival to celebrate them. During the festival, Carmine and the player briefly encounter Ogerpon, who drops the Teal Mask before fleeing. Carmine stops the player from telling Kieran what happened, as he idolizes Ogerpon and she fears his feelings would be hurt if he knew he missed a chance to meet her.

The next morning, Carmine's grandfather reveals that Ogerpon was a kind Pokémon who, along with her original trainer, was rejected by the villagers due to their appearance. However, their ancestor, the village's mask maker, took pity on them and gave them four masks; the Teal Mask, the Hearthflame Mask, the Wellspring Mask, and the Cornerstone Mask, which they used to blend in with the villagers. However, the Loyal Three attacked Ogerpon's Trainer and stole three of the masks. Ogerpon killed the three Pokémon, but before she could get the masks, the villagers scared her away out of fear she was attacking them. The Three were erroneously thought to have died in fending her off and falsely declared as heroes. Carmine decides to make amends with Ogerpon by repairing the Teal Mask. However, they are unaware that Kieran overheard their conversation; the next day, he steals the Teal Mask and angrily confronts the player at the shrine over being lied to. After being defeated at the shrine, he gives the mask back. Suddenly, the Loyal Three are revived and head for Kitakami Hall.

The player and Carmine follow the Loyal Three there, but find that the villagers ignorantly gave them the masks along with mochi that is implied to be infused with Herba Mystica, as the latter eventually causes the Three to grow to Titan size. They then learn that the Three went after Ogerpon, intending to settle the score with her. Realizing Ogerpon is completely defenseless against the Three without her masks, Carmine heads off to repair the Teal Mask, while the player goes after the Three and manages to fend them off after defeating Munkidori. The player and Carmine eventually resolve to help Ogerpon recover her masks, with the player bonding with Ogerpon in the process. While the player and Carmine pursue the now Titan-sized Three and defeat them to reclaim the masks, Kieran tells the villagers the true story, and they apologize to Ogerpon. After returning her to her cave, Ogerpon reveals she wants to stay with the player, but Kieran demands to battle the player for her. After defeating him, the player battles and successfully catches Ogerpon, leading a distraught Kieran to flee home and lock himself in his room. The next day, Briar announces that she, Carmine, and Kieran must return to Blueberry Academy due to a development regarding Area Zero, so the player and Carmine bid farewell to each other.

Meanwhile, Kieran, now consumed by hatred, swears to get stronger and make the player pay for their perceived betrayal of him.

=== Part 2: The Indigo Disk ===
A month after the events of The Teal Mask, Director Clavell calls the player to inform them they have been chosen for a foreign exchange student program. They go to the Blueberry Academy in the Unova Region, where they meet Director Cyrano and student Lacey. They head to the terrarium, where they attend a class in one of the biomes. The player then gets a call from Carmine and the two meet up at the Central Plaza. While catching up, they notice Kieran, who has changed his appearance and is yelling at another student. Carmine reveals that ever since they first met, Kieran has pushed himself and others to be the strongest they can be and has become dead-set on getting his revenge on the player for the events in Kitakami. Later, the player meets another student named Drayton, who invites them to lunch. There, he reveals that he and students Amarys, Crispin, and Lacey, who are among the strongest students in the school, are part of the BB League, and he wishes for the player to defeat the BB League Champion Kieran. After defeating all four of them, the player battles and defeats Kieran, causing him to have a breakdown while becoming new BB League Champion. However, the player is an exchange student and will most likely leave soon, meaning they cannot be champion for long. Just then the player, Drayton, Carmine, and Kieran are called to a room by Ms. Briar, where she tells them she has learned of Terapagos's location, believing it to be underneath Area Zero. She invites them to help her find it; Drayton decides to stay behind as everyone else decides to go to Area Zero, with Kieran hoping to catch Terapagos.

Upon arriving underneath Area Zero, the four arrive at a large crystalized tree and find a small yellow gem, which Ms. Briar identifies as Terapagos. Kieran vents his frustrations, bemoaning how he still has not beaten the player and that his gripe with them is not just because of their strength, but also their habit of making friends everywhere they go - including Carmine and Ogerpon - when he finally awakens Terapagos and catches it using a Master Ball. Ms. Briar then asks Kieran to battle the player with Terapagos. Determined to achieve his revenge, Kieran accepts, but the player defeats it. Ms. Briar realizes that he must Terastallize Terapagos to unlock its full power. However, this results in Terapagos going out of control, breaking its Master Ball, and endangering the group; the player and Carmine battle it, but the latter is defeated. Distraught that all his actions had caused, Kieran eventually helps to battle alongside the player against Terapagos, before the player catches it. The four return to Blueberry Academy, with Ms. Briar apologizing for getting them all in danger and Kieran apologizing for his actions.

After the credits roll, the player can take Terapagos to a crystal pool in Kitakami, where it uses its powers to bring either Professor Sada or Turo from across time. They talk with the professor, learning about their dreams and how they feel about Arven. The professor gives them either the Scarlet or Violet Book depending on which game in exchange for a copy of a book of the underdepths expedition Briar gave the player, before returning to their time, implicitly leading to the events of the games in the first place.

=== Epilogue: Mochi Mayhem ===
The player travels back to Kitakami with their friends Arven, Penny, and Nemona after receiving a letter from Kieran. The group arrives, only to discover Carmine acting strangely. The group decides to wait until the next day to find the source of her affliction, but Nemona vanishes later that night. The player and Kieran find and pursue Nemona to Kitakami Hall, finding that the townsfolk have come under the same affliction as Carmine after eating strange mochi, including Kieran's grandfather and grandmother. The pair are called back to town by Penny and Arven, and the group encounters Pecharunt, a Mythical Pokémon who had masterminded the Loyal Three's raid on Ogerpon's cave long ago in an attempt to appease an elderly couple that took it in. Pecharunt sends mochi into Arven and Penny's mouths, but barely missing the player and Kieran, and they fall under Pecharunt's control. Pecharunt has the two attack the player and Kieran, and after Penny and Arven are defeated, Pecharunt flees. Kieran and the player pursue Pecharunt, and the player eventually defeats a Pecharunt-controlled Nemona during a final confrontation at Loyalty Plaza. Pecharunt attacks, but the player defeats and captures Pecharunt, freeing the townsfolk and the player's friends from its control. A few days later, Carmine and Kieran leave for Blueberry Academy, while the player and their friends return to Paldea Region.

== Development ==
The Hidden Treasure of Area Zero was announced during a Pokémon Presents on 27 February 2023. Combined, both parts of the DLC introduce over 230 returning Pokémon that did not appear in the base game (including all prior generations' first partner Pokémon) alongside new Pokémon. The Teal Mask introduces Dipplin, a new evolution for Applin, the Poltchageist line, which convergently resembles the Sinistea line, and the Legendary Pokémon Okidogi, Munkidori, Fezandipiti, and Ogerpon. The Indigo Disk introduces Hydrapple, the evolution of Dipplin, Archaludon, the evolution of Duraludon, four new Paradox Pokémon, Gouging Fire and Raging Bolt for Scarlet and Iron Crown and Iron Boulder for Violet (which resemble Entei, Raikou, Cobalion and Terrakion, respectively), and the Legendary Pokémon Terapagos. The epilogue introduces the Mythical Pokémon Pecharunt.

In The Teal Mask, which is based on the legend of Momotarō, the player embarks on a school trip organized by Naranja/Uva Academy's sister school, Blueberry Academy, to the land of Kitakami, which would also coincide with a festival in the village, whilst uncovering the truth behind a local legend. In The Indigo Disk, the player studies at Blueberry Academy as an exchange student, eventually travelling back to Area Zero, where they previously thwarted the corrupted AI professor's plans. In Mochi Mayhem, which serves to conclude the DLC (and Scarlet and Violet as a whole), the player's friends from Paldea join them on a trip to Kitakami, where things take an unexpected turn. The epilogue can be unlocked by acquiring a Mythical Pecha Berry via a Mystery Gift, along with completing both parts of the DLC as well as completing the Academy Ace Tournament in the base games at least once. The player must then investigate a Pecha Berry-like decoration (in fact, the dormant Pecharunt) in the shop in Mossui Town once these steps are completed to start the epilogue.

== Reception ==
=== The Teal Mask ===
Reception

Aggregate scores
Aggregator	Score
Metacritic	65/100
OpenCritic	39% recommend

Review scores
Publication	Score
Destructoid	6/10
Digital Trends	2.5/5
HobbyConsolas	65/100
Jeuxvideo.com	15/20
MeriStation	7/10
Nintendo Life	6/10
PC Games (DE)	7/10

The Teal Mask received a score of 65/100 on the Metacritic reviewing aggregator, indicating mixed or average reviews. Fellow review aggregator OpenCritic assessed that the game received fair approval, being recommended by 39% of critics. Reviewers generally felt that while The Teal Mask enhanced the main game's strengths, the Teal Mask also exacerbated the main game's weaknesses: IGN's Rebekah Valentine cut to the chase on the game's volatility, such as "...the overall ugliness and performance issues did detract from locations that looked like they were probably quite beautiful in their concept art, just not their final execution..." In addition, Kotaku's Kenneth Shepard says The Teal Mask "embodies the best and worst parts of the original game", through "The story is where The Teal Mask shines in spite of the technical troubles, so perhaps fittingly, this DLC embodies both the best and worst parts of Scarlet and Violet."

Outside of the worse performance issues (such as frame rates and graphics), the Teal Mask received generally good reception on the story and music. However, one aspect that was not present from the base game is that The Teal Mask lacked the freedom to explore the region, since there was only one story to focus on, resulting in linearity. In particular, Sports Illustrated's Ryan Woodrow shared that "There are plenty of little caves and nooks in the world of Kitakami, but they aren't as rewarding as the ones you can find in the main game." Despite this, The Verge's Charles Pulliam-Moore claims that "...one of the most unexpectedly pleasant things about The Teal Mask is how strongly it establishes Kitakami as its own distinct space that exists within the larger world." Further, the Digital Trends' Giovanni Colantonio commented that "[the] central story doubles down on Scarlet and Violet's storytelling strengths by telling an endearing tale that's custom-built for young players."

=== The Indigo Disk ===
Reception

Aggregate scores
Aggregator	Score
Metacritic	70/100
OpenCritic	48% recommend

Review scores
Publication	Score
Destructoid	6/10
HobbyConsolas	80/100
IGN	7/10
Nintendo Life	6/10

The Indigo Disk received a score of 70/100 on the Metacritic reviewing aggregator, indicating mixed or average reception. OpenCritic assessed that the game received fair approval, being recommended by 48% of critics. Critics across the board praised expanded gameplay/features, music, and the easter eggs to Pokémon Black and White and Pokémon Black 2 and White 2. However, for the first time, reviewers were disappointed with the story and its ending–including the secret ending and the Mochi Mayhem epilogue–due to the pace of the story, rushed conclusion, and lack of story continuation from the base game. Critics also emphasized the continuation of the performance and frame rate issues that were just as bad as the Teal Mask. For example, Rebekah Valentine from IGN noted that "It was strange too that the titular 'Hidden Treasure of Area Zero' was tacked onto the end of Indigo Disk's campaign, like someone realized last minute what the title was and scrambled to make it work." In addition, Kenneth Shepard of Kotaku stated that "Maybe it's fine that fans can continue to theorycraft about some pillars of Scarlet and Violet's story, but I would have liked to have seen a finale that went as hard as the main game."

Outside of the continuing criticism of the frame rate and graphics, the Indigo Disk did have many new features that critics responded positively to. In regards to gameplay, Ryan Woodrow of Sports Illustrated shares "[The environment] is plenty of fun to scour while looking for returning Pokémon, with more twists and turns than you may realize at first, especially when you start diving into caves." In addition, Austin King of Screen Rant comments on the common opinion that the gameplay is tougher (but encouraged) through "The [battle] fights still aren't challenging compared to those found in many contemporary RPGs, but by the series' standards, they definitely feel harder. In regards to the music, Alana Hagues of Nintendo Life cements "And the new songs introduced here range from extremely hummable to downright rocking. Music has long been the series' strong point, but the tracks here also help to make the Terarium one of the best places to explore in the entirety of Scarlet & Violet."
