= Genting Poker Series =

Global poker tournament

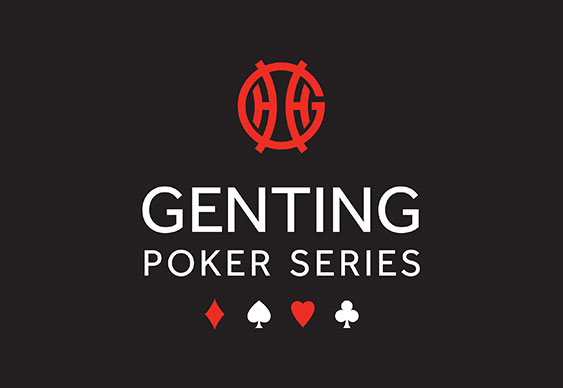
- Sport: poker
- Founded: February 2, 2012; 14 years ago
- Folded: 2020
- President: Paul Willcock (2016-2024)
- General manager: Kevin Proctor (2002-2020)
- Organizing body: Genting Casino
- Countries: England; Scotland
- Most titles: (Scotland) Colin Gillion (3 Main)
- Sponsor: PokerStars.com
- Website: Genting Casino

The Genting Poker Series was a major series of regional poker tournaments held across the United Kingdom run by Genting Casinos, a UK based casino chain operated by the Genting Group. The Genting Poker Series was established in 2012, returning for subsequent seasons in 2013, 2014 and 2015.

In 2017, PokerStars announces partnership with Genting Casinos UK, allowing players to qualify for live tournaments online.

"The link with PokerStars will allow more people to take part in the GPS through the provision of a clear online qualification route,”
Kevin Proctor (Genting Casinos UK’s Poker Operations Manager)

In 2020, Genting Cassino ceasing all live poker operations in the UK permanently.

“The COVID-19 pandemic has caused unprecedented challenges. It has had a huge financial impact on our business and caused significant uncertainty for the foreseeable future. I am therefore forced to contemplate some very difficult options to ensure survival.”
Paul Willcock (President and COO of Genting UK)

== Tournament results ==
=== 2012 Series ===
| Date/Local | Event/Buy-in | Entires | Prize Pool | Winner | Prize | Results |
|---|---|---|---|---|---|---|
| 2–5 February; Genting Club Star City | (England) GPS Birmingham Leg 1 £400+£30 | 365 | £146,000 | (England) Ruslan Vlasov | £18,200 | |
| 28 March–1 April; Fox Poker Club | (England) GPS London Leg 2 £400+£30 | 580 | £232,000 | (England) Albert Sapiano | £50,160 | |
| 31 May– 2 June; Genting Casino Fountainpark | (Scotland) GPS Edinburgh Leg 3 £400+£30 | 388 | £155,200 | (Scotland) Paul McTaggart | £32,685 | |
| 2–5 August; Genting Club Stoke | (England) GPS Stoke on Trent Leg 4 £400+£30 | 482 | £192,440 | (Turkey) Yucel Eminoglu | £46,550 | |
| 27-30 September; GPS at iPoker network | GPS Online Leg 5 £400+£30 £100,000 Prizepool Guaranteed | 250 | £100,000 | (United Kingdom) Keith Bartholomew “EngBart” | £26,600 | |
| 22–25 November; Genting Club Sheffield | (England) GPS Sheffield Leg 6 £400+£30 £100,000 Prizepool Guaranteed | 562 | £224,800 | (England) Hasmukh Khodiyara | £50,000 | |
| 6–9 December; Fox Poker Club | (England) GPS London Grand Final £1,500+£100 £200,000 Prizepool Guaranteed | 176 | £259,600 | (England) Elliott Panyi | £66,900 | |

=== 2013 Series ===
| Date/Local | Event/Buy-in | Entires | Prize Pool | Winner | Prize | Results |
|---|---|---|---|---|---|---|
| 7–10 February; Genting Club Star City | (England) GPS Birmingham Leg 1 £400+£40 £100,000 Prizepool Guaranteed | 584 | £236,000 | (England) Julian Thew | £40,120 | |
| 20–24 March; Genting Casino Newcastle | (England) GPS Newcastle Leg 2 £400+£40 £100,000 Prizepool Guaranteed | 400 | £160,000 | (Poland) Ellie Biessek | £38,620 | |
| 15–19 May; Genting Club Sheffield | (England) GPS Sheffield Leg 3 £400+£40 £100,000 Prizepool Guaranteed | 546 | £218,390 | (Scotland) Mudasser Hussain | £42,960 | |
| 14–18 August; Genting Club Westcliff | (England) GPS Southend Leg 4 £400+£40 £100,000 Prizepool Guaranteed | 367 | £172,400 | (England) Danny Tran | £30,765 | |
| 12–15 September; Genting Club Stoke | (England) GPS Stoke on Trent Leg 5 £400+£40 £100,000 Prizepool Guaranteed | 415 | £166,000 | (England) Tony Hallam | £34,360 | |
| 10–14 October; Genting Casino Fountainpark | (Scotland) GPS Edinburgh Leg 6 £400+£40 £100,000 Prizepool Guaranteed | 352 | £140,800 | (England) Mark Lane | £30,850 | |
| 12–15 December; Genting Club Sheffield | (England) GPS Sheffield Grand Final £800+£80 £100,000 Prizepool Guaranteed | 262 | £209,600 | (England) Richard Milner | £40,086 | |

=== 2014 Series ===
| Date/Local | Event/Buy-in | Entires | Prize Pool | Winner | Prize | Results |
|---|---|---|---|---|---|---|
| 12–16 February; Genting Club Star City | (England) GPS Birmingham Leg 1 £400+£40 £125,000 Prizepool Guaranteed | 437 | £174,800 | (England) Faisal Shabbir | £40,215 | |
| 13–16 March; Genting Club Sheffield | (England) GPS Sheffield Leg 2 £400+£40 £125,000 Prizepool Guaranteed | 400 | £160,000 | (South Africa) James Parker | £22,120 | |
| 10–13 April; Genting Club Westcliff | (England) GPS Southend Leg 3 £400+£40 £125,000 Prizepool Guaranteed | unknown | £125,000 | (England) Robert Mcadam | £33,730 | |
| 21-25 May; Genting Club Stoke | (England) GPS Stoke on Trent Leg 4 £400+£40 £125,000 Prizepool Guaranteed | 360 | £144,000 | (Wales) Iwan Jones | £32,030 | |
| 23-27 July; Genting Casino Newcastle | (England) GPS Newcastle Leg 5 £400+£40 £125,000 Prizepool Guaranteed | 297 | £125,000 | (Hong Kong) Timothy Chung | £32,815 | |
| 17-21 September; Dusk Till Dawn | (England) GPS Nottingham Leg 6 £400+£40 £125,000 Prizepool Guaranteed | 632 | £252,800 | (England) Ali Ayub | £40,255 | |
| 29 October-2 November; Genting Casino Fountainpark | (Scotland) GPS Edinburgh Leg 7 £400+£40 £125,000 Prizepool Guaranteed | 290 | £125,000 | (Scotland) Martin J Smith | £33,730 | |
| 10–14 December; Genting Club Sheffield | (England) GPS Sheffield Grand Final £800+£80 £200,000 Prizepool Guaranteed | 255 | £204,000 | (England) Mark Evans | £54,060 | |

=== 2015 Series ===
| Date/Local | Event/Buy-in | Entires | Prize Pool | Winner | Prize | Results |
|---|---|---|---|---|---|---|
| 5-8 February; Genting Club Star City | (England) GPS Birmingham Leg 1 £400+£40 £100,000 Prizepool Guaranteed | 404 | £161,600 | (England) Chris Johnson | £37,000 | |
| 18-22 March; Genting Club Westcliff | (England) GPS Southend Leg 2 £400+£40 £100,000 Prizepool Guaranteed | 340 | £136,000 | (England) David L'Honore | £21,970 | |
| 8-12 April; Genting Casino Newcastle | (England) GPS Newcastle Leg 3 £400+£40 £100,000 Prizepool Guaranteed | 248 | £100,000 | (Scotland) Ludovic Geilich | £27,500 | |
| 13-17 May; Genting Casino Reading | (England) GPS Mini Reading Leg 4 £200+£20 £30,000 Prizepool Guaranteed | 288 | £57,600 | (England) Jason Willis | £15,280 | |
| 19-21 June; Grosvenor Casinos Liverpool | (England) GPS Mini Liverpool Leg 5 £200+£20 £30,000 Prizepool Guaranteed | 277 | £55,400 | (England) Matty Stitt | £14,450 | |
| 19-21 June; Genting Club Luton | (England) GPS Mini Luton Leg 6 £200+£20 £30,000 Prizepool Guaranteed | 434 | £86,800 | (Turkey) Yucel Eminoglu | £13,200 | |
| 9-13 September; Genting Club Stoke | (England) GPS Stoke on Trent Leg 7 £400+£20 £100,000 Prizepool Guaranteed | 284 | £113,600 | (Denmark) Pia Jeppesen | £30,660 | |
| 30 September-4 October; Genting Casino Fountainpark | (Scotland) GPS Edinburgh Leg 8 £400+£40 £100,000 Prizepool Guaranteed | 275 | £110,000 | (Scotland) Colin Gillion | £25,270 | |
| 3-7 February; Genting Club Star City | (England) GPS Mini Birmingham Leg 9 £200+£20 £35,000 Prizepool Guaranteed | 274 | £54,800 | (England) Darren Grosvenor | £12,000 | |
| 10–14 December; Genting Club Sheffield | (England) GPS Sheffield Final £400+£40 £100,000 Prizepool Guaranteed | 360 | £144,000 | (England) Matthew Davenport | £37,000 | |

=== 2016 Series ===
| Date/Local | Event/Buy-in | Entires | Prize Pool | Winner | Prize | Results |
|---|---|---|---|---|---|---|
| 20-24 January; Genting Club Luton | (England) GPS Mini Luton Leg 1 £200+£20 £35,000 Prizepool Guaranteed | 389 | £73,840 | (England) David Lloyd | £12,075 | |
| 3-7 February; Genting Club Star City | (England) GPS Birmingham Leg 2 £400+£40 £100,000 Prizepool Guaranteed | 282 | £112,800 | (Scotland) Colin Gillion | £26,150 | |
| 25-27 February; Genting Club Sheffield | (England) GPS Mini Sheffield Leg 3 £200+£20 £40,000 Prizepool Guaranteed | 200 | £40,000 | (England) Matthew Wood | £10,100 | |
| 16-20 March; Genting Club Westcliff | (England) GPS Westcliff Leg 4 £400+£40 £100,000 Prizepool Guaranteed | 245 | £100,000 | (England) Danny Tran | £25,000 | |
| 30 March-3 April; Genting Club Glasgow | (Scotland) GPS Mini Glasgow Leg 5 £200+£20 £35,000 Prizepool Guaranteed | 250 | £46,040 | (England) Derek Leach | £12,550 | |
| 13-17 April; Genting Casino Reading | (England) GPS Mini Reading Leg 6 £200+£20 £35,000 Prizepool Guaranteed | 200 | £36,040 | (England) Matthew Bonham | £10,095 | |
| 26–29 May; Genting Club Stoke | (England) GPS Mini Stoke Leg 7 £200+£20 £35,000 Prizepool Guaranteed | 222 | £44,400 | (England) Endrit Geci | £11,000 | |
| 15–19 June; Genting Club Queen Square | (England) GPS Mini Liverpool Leg 8 £200+£20 £35,000 Prizepool Guaranteed | 237 | £47,400 | (England) Neil Marshall | £7,070 | |
| 14–17 July; Genting Club Luton | (England) GPS Mini Luton Leg 9 £200+£20 £35,000 Prizepool Guaranteed | 381 | £72,240 | (England) Paul Nugent | £9,255 | |
| 17–21 August; Genting Club Resorts World Birmingham | (England) GPS Mini Birmingham Leg 10 £200+£20 £35,000 Prizepool Guaranteed | 237 | £47,400 | (England) Michael Hart | £10,000 | |
| 8-11 September; Genting Club Star City | (England) GPS Mini Birmingham Leg 11 £200+£20 £35,000 Prizepool Guaranteed | n/a | n/a | n/a | n/a | |
| 28 September-2 October; Genting Casino Fountainpark | (Scotland) GPS Edinburgh Leg 12 £400+£40 £100,000 Prizepool Guaranteed | 221 | £100,000 | (Scotland) Colin Gillion | £28,500 | |
| 12–16 October; Genting Club Westcliff-on-Sea | (England) GPS Mini Westcliff Leg 13 £200+£20 £35,000 Prizepool Guaranteed | 273 | £54,600 | (England) Trishal Nanji | £6,940 | |
| 10–13 November; Genting Club Torquay | (England) GPS Mini Torquay Leg 14 £200+£20 £35,000 Prizepool Guaranteed | 347 | £36,840 | (England) Guy Leathley | £10,680 | |
| 16-20 November; Genting Casino Newcastle | (England) GPS Mini Newcastle Leg 15 £200+£20 £35,000 Prizepool Guaranteed | 249 | £49,400 | (England) Gerry Mcinally | £12,380 | |
| 7-11 December; Genting Club Sheffield | (England) GPS Sheffield Final £400+£40 £100,000 Prizepool Guaranteed | 301 | £120,400 | (England) Daniel Stanway | £31,700 | |

=== 2017 Series ===
| Date/Local | Event/Buy-in | Entires | Prize Pool | Winner | Prize | Results |
|---|---|---|---|---|---|---|
| 20-24 January; Genting Club Luton | (England) GPS Luton Leg 1 £400+£40 £100,000 Prizepool Guaranteed | 334 | £133,600 | (England) John Bonadies | £31,590 | |
| 16-19 February; Genting Casino Newcastle | (England) GPS Mini Newcastle Leg 2 £200+£20 £35,000 Prizepool Guaranteed | 287 | £57,400 | (England) John Stirling | £11,490 | |
| 16-19 March; Genting Club Sheffield | (England) GPS Sheffield Leg 3 £400+£40 £100,000 Prizepool Guaranteed | 230 | £100,000 | (England) Brandon Sheils | £27,000 | |
| 30 March-2 April; Genting Club Queen Square | (England) GPS Mini Liverpool Leg 4 £200+£20 £35,000 Prizepool Guaranteed | 277 | £55,400 | (England) Louis Eyles | £8,880 | |
| 30 March-2 April; Genting Casino Reading | (England) GPS Mini Reading Leg 5 £200+£20 £35,000 Prizepool Guaranteed | 242 | £48,400 | (Lithuania) Justinas Pactauskas | £12,440 | |
| 27-30 April; Genting Club Glasgow | (Scotland) GPS Mini Glasgow Leg 6 £200+£20 £35,000 Prizepool Guaranteed | 428 | £42,840 | (Scotland) Scott Logan | £11,000 | |
| 4–7 May; Genting Club Blackpool | (England) GPS Mini Blackpool Leg 7 £200+£20 £35,000 Prizepool Guaranteed | 239 | £47,800 | (England) Christopher Beek | £10,132 | |
| 18–21 May; Genting Club Westcliff-on-Sea | (England) GPS Westcliff Leg 8 £400+£40 £100,000 Prizepool Guaranteed | n/a | £100,000 | (England) Lam Trinh | £18,000 | |
| 13-16 July; Genting Club Luton | (England) GPS Mini Luton Leg 10 £200+£20 £35,000 Prizepool Guaranteed | 345 | £65,400 | (England) Paul Bahbout | £12,570 | |
| 20–23 July; Genting Club Resorts World | (England) GPS Mini RWB Leg 9 £200+£20 £35,000 Prizepool Guaranteed | 236 | £47,240 | (England) Laith Sheena | £10,230 | |
| 17–20 August; Genting Club Stoke | (England) GPS Mini Stoke Leg 11 £200+£20 £35,000 Prizepool Guaranteed | 196 | £39,200 | (England) Gerald Mcsorley | £10,140 | |
| 30 August-3 September; Genting Club Queen Square | (England) GPS Liverpool Leg 12 £400+£40 £100,000 Prizepool Guaranteed | 223 | £100,000 | (England) Jakariya Mustafa | £28,000 | |
| 28 September-1 October; Genting Casino Fountainpark | (Scotland) GPS Edinburgh Leg 13 £400+£40 £100,000 Prizepool Guaranteed | 291 | £116,400 | (Scotland) Tony Galloway | £23,410 | |
| 12-15 October; Genting Club Sheffield | (England) GPS Mini Sheffield Leg 14 £200+£20 £35,000 Prizepool Guaranteed | 214 | £42,800 | (Spain) Pedro Schulze | £7,920 | |
| 26–29 October; Genting Club Torquay | (England) GPS Mini Torquay Leg 15 £200+£20 £35,000 Prizepool Guaranteed | 160 | £35,000 | (England) Luke Radford | £8,500 | |
| 16–19 November; Genting Club Westcliff-on-Sea | (England) GPS Mini Westcliff Leg 16 £200+£20 £35,000 Prizepool Guaranteed | 186 | £49,640 | (England) Paul Bahbout | £9,940 | |
| 16-19 November; Genting Casino Newcastle | (England) GPS Mini Newcastle Leg 17 £200+£20 £35,000 Prizepool Guaranteed | 285 | £57,000 | (England) Saifur Chowdhury | £8,260 | |

=== 2018 Series ===
| Date/Local | Event/Buy-in | Entires | Prize Pool | Winner | Prize | Results |
|---|---|---|---|---|---|---|
| 1-4 February; Genting Casino Newcastle | (England) GPS Mini Newcastle Leg 1 £200+£20 £35,000 Prizepool Guaranteed | 231 | £46,200 | (England) Jonathan Bowers | £12,460 | |
| 1-4 March; Genting Club Resorts World | (England) GPS Mini Birmingham Leg 2 £200+£20 £35,000 Prizepool Guaranteed | 177 | £44,440 | (England) Andrew Partou | £8,175 | |
| 7-11 March; Genting Club Luton | (England) GPS Luton Leg 3 £400+£40 £100,000 Prizepool Guaranteed | 317 | £128,800 | (England) James Ablott | £14,940 | |
| 22–25 March; Genting Club Queen Square | (England) GPS Mini Liverpool Leg 4 £200+£20 £35,000 Prizepool Guaranteed | 375 | £75,000 | (England) Tolga Istek | | |
| 22–25 March; Genting Club Westcliff-on-Sea | (England) GPS Westcliff Leg 5 £200+£20 £35,000 Prizepool Guaranteed | 228 | £41,640 | (England) Andrew Finnie | £9,300 | |
| 3-6 May; Genting Club Salford | (England) GPS Mini Salford Leg 7 £200+£20 £35,000 Prizepool Guaranteed | 202 | £40,400 | (France) Gaetan Martinez | £10,400 | |
| 10-13 May; Genting Club Resorts World | (England) GPS Mini Birmingham Leg 8 £400+£40 £100,000 Prizepool Guaranteed | 246 | £100,000 | (England) Mazalahedwa Bako | £24,000 | |
| 17–20 May; Genting Casino Reading | (England) GPS Mini Reading Leg 9 £200+£20 £35,000 Prizepool Guaranteed | 191 | £38,200 | (England) Aleem Kanji | £12,440 | |
| 31 May-3 June; Genting Club Glasgow | (Scotland) GPS Mini Glasgow Leg 10 £200+£20 £35,000 Prizepool Guaranteed | 212 | £42,440 | (Scotland) James Kirkwood | £12,280 | |
| 12-15 July; Genting Club Luton | (England) GPS Mini Luton Leg 11 £200+£20 £35,000 Prizepool Guaranteed | 231 | £46,200 | (France) Cedric Raffi | £13,690 | |
| 17–20 August; Genting Club Stoke | (England) GPS Mini Stoke Leg 12 £200+£20 £35,000 Prizepool Guaranteed | 171 | £35,000 | (England) Martin Hockaday | £8,000 | |
| 29 August-2 September; Genting Club Queen Square | (England) GPS Liverpool Leg 13 £400+£40 £100,000 Prizepool Guaranteed | 229 | £100,000 | (England) Mike Allen | £21,320 | |
| 5-7 October; Genting Casino Fountainpark | (Scotland) GPS Edinburgh Leg 14 £400+£40 £100,000 Prizepool Guaranteed | 239 | £100,000 | (Scotland) Craig Brown | £20,000 | |
| 11-14 October; Genting Club Sheffield | (England) GPS Mini Sheffield Leg 15 £200+£20 £35,000 Prizepool Guaranteed | 252 | £46,440 | (China) Chaofan Lei | £9,350 | |
| 8-11 November; Genting Casino Newcastle | (England) GPS Mini Newcastle Leg 17 £200+£20 £35,000 Prizepool Guaranteed | 231 | £42,240 | (England) Dave Penly | £10,400 | |
| 15–18 November; Genting Club Westcliff-on-Sea | (England) GPS Mini Westcliff Leg 16 £200+£20 £35,000 Prizepool Guaranteed | n/a | n/a | n/a | n/a | |
| 12-16 December; Genting Club Luton | (England) GPS Luton Leg 18 £400+£40 £100,000 Prizepool Guaranteed | 266 | £106,400 | (Republic of Ireland) Gerald Crone | £26,610 | |

=== 2019 Series ===
| Date/Local | Event/Buy-in | Entires | Prize Pool | Winner | Prize | Results |
|---|---|---|---|---|---|---|
| 21-24 February; Genting Casino Newcastle | (England) GPS Mini Newcastle Leg 1 £200+£25 | 299 | £59,800 | (England) Zac Aynsley | ~£11,000 | |
| 28 February-3 March; Genting Club Blackpool | (England) GPS Mini Blackpool Leg 2 £200+£25 | 206 | £41,200 | (England) Tolga Istek | n/a | |
| 14–17 March; Genting Club Westcliff-on-Sea | (England) GPS Westcliff Leg 3 £200+£25 | 224 | £40,300 | (England) Nicholas Riseley | £9,620 | |
| 28–31 March; Genting Club Stoke | (England) GPS Mini Stoke Leg 4 £200+£25 | 175 | £35,000 | (England) Carl Taylor | £7,700 | |
| 25–28 April; Genting Casino Reading | (England) GPS Mini Reading Leg 5 £200+£25 | 284 | £52,300 | (England) Patrick Phelan | £10,595 | |
| 2–5 May; Genting Club Queen Square | (England) GPS Mini Liverpool Leg 6 £200+£25 | 319 | £63,800 | (England) David Leyland | £14,000 | |
| 9-12 May; Genting Club Resorts World | (England) GPS Birmingham Leg 7 £450+£50 | 283 | £127,350 | (Cyprus) Yiannis Liperis | £31,830 | |
| 30 May-2 June; Genting Club Sheffield | (England) GPS Mini Sheffield Leg 8 £200+£25 | 177 | £30,900 | (England) Aaron Phillip | £8,960 | |
| 17-21 July; Genting Club Luton | (England) GPS Luton Leg 9 £450+£50 | 167 | £101,700 | (England) Richard Horton | £27,230 | |
| 28 August-1 September; Genting Club Queen Square | (England) GPS Liverpool Leg 10 £450+£50 | 294 | £132,050 | (England) Tolga Istek | £30,350 | |
| 19-22 September; Genting Club Glasgow | (Scotland) GPS Mini Glasgow Leg 11 £200+£25 | n/a | n/a | n/a | n/a | |
| 19-22 September; Genting Club Resorts World | (England) GPS Mini Birmingham Leg 12 £200+£25 | n/a | n/a | n/a | n/a | |
| 2-6 October; Genting Casino Fountainpark | (Scotland) GPS Edinburgh Leg 13 £450+£50 | 228 | £102,600 | n/a | £24,760 | |
| 10-13 October; Genting Casino Newcastle | (England) GPS Mini Newcastle Leg 14 £200+£25 | 224 | £44,800 | (England) Nicholas Riseley | n/a | |
| 7-10 November; Genting Club Westcliff-on-Sea | (England) GPS Mini Westcliff Leg 15 £200+£25 | 177 | £35,400 | (England) Aaron Phillip | n/a | |
| 14-17 November; Genting Club Sheffield | (England) GPS Mini Sheffield Leg 16 £200+£25 | 302 | £55,900 | (England) Thomas Ambler | £14,375 | |
| 17-21 July; Genting Club Luton | (England) GPS Luton Leg 17 £450+£50 | n/a | n/a | n/a | n/a | |

=== 2020 Series ===
| Date/Local | Event/Buy-in | Entires | Prize Pool | Winner | Prize | Results |
|---|---|---|---|---|---|---|
| 6-9 February; Genting Casino Newcastle | (England) GPS Mini Newcastle Leg 1 £200+£25 £35,000 Prizepool Guaranteed | n/a | n/a | n/a | n/a | |
| 20-23 February; Genting Club Westcliff-on-Sea | (England) GPS Westcliff Leg 2 £200+£25 £35,000 Prizepool Guaranteed | 228 | £41,100 | (England) Gary Miller | £11,105 | |
| 26 February; Genting Club Stoke | (England) GPS Super 80 Stoke £68+£12 £15,000 Prizepool Guaranteed | 397 | £26,966 | (Bulgaria) Teodor Velichkov | £5,946 | |
| 5-8 March; Genting Club Sheffield | (England) GPS Mini Sheffield Leg 3 £200+£25 £35,000 Prizepool Guaranteed | CANCELED due COVID-19 pandemic lockdown | | | | |
| 26–29 March; Genting Club Blackpool | (England) GPS Mini Blackpool Leg 4 £200+£25 £35,000 Prizepool Guaranteed | CANCELED due COVID-19 pandemic lockdown | | | | |
| 30 April-3 May; Genting Club Queen Square | (England) GPS Mini Liverpool Leg 5 £200+£25 £35,000 Prizepool Guaranteed | CANCELED due COVID-19 pandemic lockdown | | | | |
| 6-10 May; Genting Club Luton | (England) GPS Luton Leg 6 £450+£50 £100,000 Prizepool Guaranteed | CANCELED due COVID-19 pandemic lockdown | | | | |
| 20 May; Genting Club Sheffield | (England) GPS Super 80 Sheffield £68+£12 £15,000 Prizepool Guaranteed | CANCELED due COVID-19 pandemic lockdown | | | | |
| 27-31 May; Genting Casino Fountainpark | (Scotland) GPS Edinburgh Leg 7 £450+£50 £100,000 Prizepool Guaranteed | CANCELED due COVID-19 pandemic lockdown | | | | |
| 4-7 June; Genting Casino Reading | (England) GPS Mini Reading Leg 8 £200+£25 £35,000 Prizepool Guaranteed | CANCELED due COVID-19 pandemic lockdown | | | | |
| 17 June; Genting Club Westcliff-on-Sea | (England) GPS Super 80 Westcliff £68+£12 £15,000 Prizepool Guaranteed | CANCELED due COVID-19 pandemic lockdown | | | | |
| 25-28 June; Genting Club Luton | (England) GPS Mini Luton Leg 9 £200+£25 £35,000 Prizepool Guaranteed | CANCELED due COVID-19 pandemic lockdown | | | | |
| 22 July; Genting Casino Newcastle | (England) GPS Super 80 Newcastle £68+£12 £15,000 Prizepool Guaranteed | CANCELED due COVID-19 pandemic lockdown | | | | |
| 13-16 August; Genting Club Stoke | (England) GPS Mini Stoke Leg 10 £200+£25 £35,000 Prizepool Guaranteed | CANCELED due COVID-19 pandemic lockdown | | | | |
| 19-23 August; Genting Club Torquay | (England) GPS Mini Torquay Leg 11 £200+£25 £35,000 Prizepool Guaranteed | CANCELED due COVID-19 pandemic lockdown | | | | |
| 26-30 August; Genting Club Queen Square | (England) GPS Liverpool Leg 12 £450+£50 £100,000 Prizepool Guaranteed | CANCELED due COVID-19 pandemic lockdown | | | | |
| 9 September; Genting Casino Reading | (England) GPS Super 80 Reading £68+£12 £15,000 Prizepool Guaranteed | CANCELED due COVID-19 pandemic lockdown | | | | |
| 6-9 February; Genting Casino Newcastle | (England) GPS Mini Newcastle Leg 13 £200+£25 £35,000 Prizepool Guaranteed | CANCELED due COVID-19 pandemic lockdown | | | | |
| 921-25 October; Genting Club Resorts World | (England) GPS Birmingham Leg 14 £450+£50 £100,000 Prizepool Guaranteed | CANCELED due COVID-19 pandemic lockdown | | | | |
| 29 October-1 November; Genting Club Westcliff-on-Sea | (England) GPS Westcliff Leg 15 £200+£25 £35,000 Prizepool Guaranteed | CANCELED due COVID-19 pandemic lockdown | | | | |
| 12-15 November; Genting Club Sheffield | (England) GPS Mini Sheffield Leg 16 £200+£25 £35,000 Prizepool Guaranteed | CANCELED due COVID-19 pandemic lockdown | | | | |
| 26–29 March; Genting Club Blackpool | (England) GPS Super 80 Blackpool £68+£12 £15,000 Prizepool Guaranteed | CANCELED due COVID-19 pandemic lockdown | | | | |

== The Ending ==
Genting Poker Rooms Have Dealt Their Last Hand, Covid-19 Claims Another Victim Like all casino operators in the UK, Genting was forced to close its venues due to coronavirus. The doors were locked on March 21, 2020, and have stayed that way ever since.

== Multiple Titles ==
| Pos. | Player | Main | Mini |
|---|---|---|---|
| 1 | (Scotland) Colin Gillion | (2015) (2016) (2016) | |
| 2 | (England) Tolga Istek | (2019) | (2018) (2019) |
| 3 | (Turkey) Yucel Eminoglu | (2012) | (2015) |
| 4 | (England) Danny Tran | (2013) (2016) | |
| 5 | (England) Paul Bahbout | | (2017) (2017) |
| 6 | (England) Nicholas Risel | | (2019) (2019) |
| 7 | (England) Aaron Phillip | | (2019) (2019) |

== Titles by Country ==
| Pos. | Country | TOTAL | Main | Mini | Super 80 |
|---|---|---|---|---|---|
| 1 | England | 68 | 27 | 41 | |
| 2 | Scotland | 11 | 9 | 2 | |
| 3 | Turkey | 2 | 1 | 1 | |
| 4 | France | 2 | | 2 | |
| 5 | Cyprus | 1 | 1 | | |
| | Denmark | 1 | 1 | | |
| | Hong Kong | 1 | 1 | | |
| | Ireland | 1 | 1 | | |
| | Poland | 1 | 1 | | |
| | South Africa | 1 | 1 | | |
| | UK | 1 | 1 | | |
| | Wales | 1 | 1 | | |
| 13 | China | 1 | | 1 | |
| | Lithuania | 1 | | 1 | |
| | Spain | 1 | | 1 | |
| 16 | Bulgaria | 1 | | | 1 |
| | unknown | 7 | 2 | 5 | |
| | TOTAL | 102 | 47 | 54 | 1 |

* If there is a tie, it will be sorted alphabetically
