= Synthetik: Legion Rising =

2018 top-down shooter video game

- Developer: Flow Fire Games
- Publisher: Flow Fire Games
- Engine: GameMaker
- Platforms: Microsoft Windows; Nintendo Switch; Xbox One
- Release: Microsoft Windows; 16 March 2018; Xbox One, Nintendo Switch; 16 December 2020
- Genre: Top-down shooter

Synthetik: Legion Rising (Note: Stylized as SYNTHETIK: Legion Rising) (originally titled Synthetik) (Note: Stylized as SYNTHETIK) is a top-down shooter video game with roguelike elements set in an alternate 1980s where humanity is threatened by malicious artificial intelligence. The game was created with Game Maker and was developed by independent studio Flow Fire Games, based in Berlin.

The game was released on 16 March 2018 on Steam as Synthetik, and renamed to Synthetik: Legion Rising following a free expansion. A console version called Synthetik: Ultimate was released on 16 December 2020 on Xbox and Nintendo Switch. A PlayStation version has been announced. A free spinoff game called Synthetik: Arena has the same core fighting gameplay as the original, but with far less of the roguelike experience, and without fighting through multiple levels. A sequel, Synthetik 2, has been released in early access on Steam in 2021 with a full release planned for the start of 2024.

== Gameplay ==
In Synthetik: Legion Rising players start each game by choosing from one of eight classes, picking a sidearm, and choosing starting perks and equipment. They then fight through procedurally generated levels fighting robot enemies and collecting upgrades and new weapons and equipment. Every few levels is a boss battle with an extra challenging opponent. The goal of the game is to survive to the end and defeat the Final Defender who is protecting the Heart of Armageddon. It's possible to play in cooperative mode with one other player. Each player can choose their own class, weapons, perks, etc. The core gameplay is the same in cooperative mode.

== Development ==
Synthetik was released on Steam on 16 March 2018. It has received several free updates since release, including the Legion Rising update on 3 October 2018, when the name of the game was changed to Synthetik: Legion Rising. Standalone title Synthetik: Arena was released on 21 January 2019. It was a free to play game with Synthetik combat mechanics but arenas and challenges instead of multiple procedurally generated levels. A paid DLC for Arena was available to unlock a hard mode, extra weapon options, and faster XP gain.

== Reception ==
Synthetik has not received enough ratings on Metacritic for an official rating, but the three reviews skew positive, with ratings of 84, 80 and 70. Reviewers praised the roguelike aspects, shooting and weapon handling gameplay, and tactical nature of the combat as making it more than an arcade game. Criticism focused on the simple graphics and potentially repetitive gameplay.

Console reviews praised the gameplay and variety of weapons and classes, while criticizing some aspects of the controls and user interface.
