= Funzing =

- Website type: Social networking
- Available in: English
- Website: www.funzing.com
- Commercial: Yes
- Launched: 2014; 12 years ago
- Current status: Active

Funzing is an online sharing economy marketplace that facilitates people to host and attend events and experiences in their leisure time based on their hobbies, passions or skills. Funzing was founded in Israel in 2014 by Avigur Zmora, the former CEO of Playtech. Funzing is currently active in London, Manchester, Tel Aviv and Singapore. The online community marketplace promotes diversity in people's free time activities, experiences vary from supper clubs, tours, workshops to one-off lectures and classes.

== History ==
Funzing was founded in Israel in 2014. It was the brainchild of Avigur Zmora, former CEO of Playtech, who went on to set up the company together with Eran Alon, Noa Moscati, and Yaron Saghiv. The startup raised an initial investment capital from venture capital firm Inimiti for its launch in the United Kingdom, specifically targeting the Greater London area. This amounted to $1.5 million. Currently, there are over 2,000 registered hosts on the Funzing system, and more than 35,000 individuals have attended events as of June 2016.

== Concept ==
According to co-founder Yaron Saghiv, the idea about the online sharing economy came out of several friends’ frustration at being bored by going to the same places every time they wanted to spend quality free time in a social setting. Thus, the platform allows anyone with creative potential to showcase their skills to the world while entertaining others and earning some money along the way. When Funzing was launched in Singapore, it first invited participants from different niche communities and forums to become hosts. Saghiv explained that “since the events are generated by individuals and owners of small medium enterprises, it is guaranteed the variety will be unique and different.” For this reason, Funzing is also being marketed as the "Airbnb of experiences".

Funzing also partners with other establishments and communities. For instance, it collaborated with the Nottingham-based The Glee Club in a series of talks involving different subjects such as serial killers.
