= Shiny Pokémon =

Alternate forms of Pokémon species

The Pokémon Charizard in its normal form (left) and Shiny form as they appear in Pokémon Sword and Shield.

Shiny Pokémon are alternate forms of the eponymous fictional creatures of the Pokémon franchise, introduced in the 1999 games Pokémon Gold and Silver. These Pokémon have different color palettes from the standard color of their species, with each type of Pokémon having only one predetermined shiny palette. An individual Pokémon's status as being Shiny or not is determined when it is created by the game, such as by being encountered in the wild or by being born from an egg, and can not be changed after the fact; a regularly colored Pokémon will never become Shiny, and a Shiny Pokémon will never stop being Shiny. They are very rare to encounter in the Pokémon games, with very low odds of encountering one across many games in the franchise. How Shiny color palettes are determined is unclear; James Turner, a designer for the series, stated he was only able to design the Shiny palettes of his designs starting from the 2016 games Pokémon Sun and Moon. Since their inception, Shiny Pokémon have appeared throughout the franchise, including in spin-off games and the Pokémon anime.

Shiny Pokémon have proven to be popular with fans. Due to their rarity, "Shiny hunting" has emerged as a popular pastime within the Pokémon fandom, with players focusing on capturing a specific Shiny Pokémon. The ease of accessing Shiny Pokémon in later entries in the series has been critiqued, as has the overall quality of the color changes given to Shiny Pokémon as the series has progressed.

== History and appearances ==
Pokémon are species of fictional creatures created for the Pokémon media franchise. Developed by Game Freak and published by Nintendo, the Japanese franchise began in 1996 with the video games Pokémon Red and Green for the Game Boy, which were later released in North America as Pokémon Red and Blue in 1998. In these games and their sequels, the player assumes the role of a Trainer whose goal is to capture and use the creatures' special abilities to combat other Pokémon. Some Pokémon can transform into stronger species through a process called evolution, via various means, such as exposure to specific items. A major goal in each game is to complete the Pokédex, a comprehensive Pokémon encyclopedia, by capturing, evolving, and trading with other Trainers to obtain individuals from all Pokémon species.

Shiny Pokémon were introduced in the 1999 games Pokémon Gold and Silver. They are rare color variations of standard Pokémon, and have a sparkle animation upon entering combat, but have no other unique differences from a standard version of the same species. Shiny Pokémon originally had a 1 in 8192 chance of being encountered, which was increased to 1 in 4096 as of the 2013 games Pokémon X and Y. The term "Shiny" was originally used by fans and later adopted as an official name. Pokémon Sword and Shield introduced a new variant called a "Glistening Shiny", which change the sparkle animation to have squares instead of sparkles and are rarer than standard Shinies.

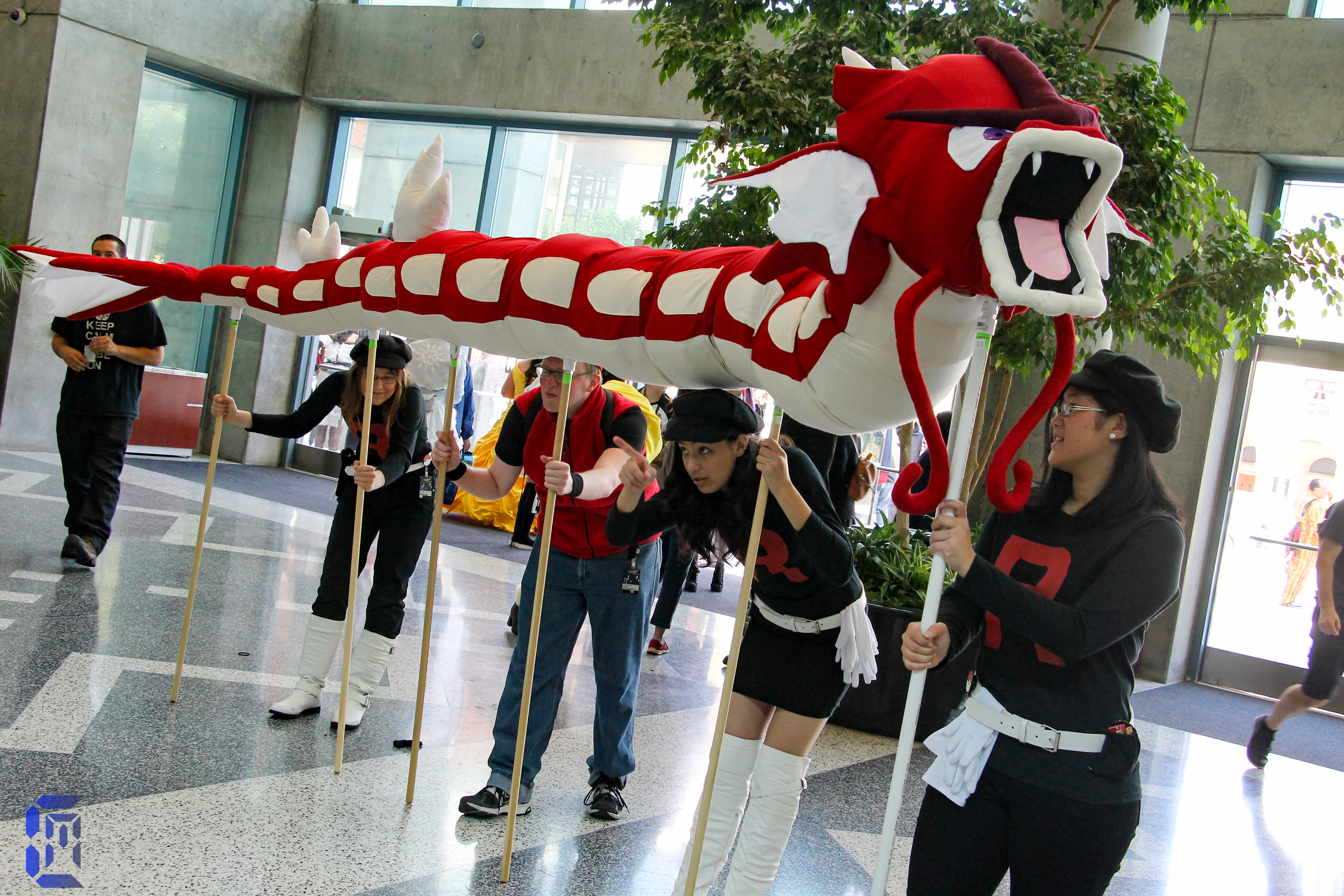
Cosplay of a Shiny Gyarados alongside several Team Rocket members at FanimeCon 2017

It is unclear how Shiny Pokémon's color palettes are created. Sports Illustrated theorized that they were generated algorithmically in older game as depending on a Pokémon's color scheme, they would tend to have particular Shiny colors; purple Pokémon, for instance, would often have green Shiny forms. The only comment made by someone who worked with Game Freak on the series is designer James Turner, who stated that he was only allowed to individually design species' Shiny forms starting in the games Pokémon Sun and Moon.

In Gold and Silver, one Shiny Pokémon, a red Gyarados, is a required encounter during the course of the main story. In Black 2 and White 2, a Dratini, Gible, and Haxorus could be obtained with their Shiny forms in guaranteed encounters throughout the games. Pokémon Legends: Arceus features a Shiny Ponyta which is a guaranteed encounter during a particular side quest, while a Shiny Blitzle is available as a gift in The Indigo Disk. Pokémon Legends: Z-A contains a guaranteed encounter with a shiny Mareep during a side quest. Certain species are also "Shiny locked", and are unable to be encountered in their Shiny forms in a given game. The locks are usually removed in later entries, but some species are unable to be obtained as Shiny Pokémon in their entirety.

=== Changes to Shiny Pokémon odds ===
Unique methods of boosting Shiny odds have been introduced throughout the series. In Gold and Silver, Shiny Pokémon had a 1 out of 64 chance of being obtained from the game's Pokémon breeding mechanic if one of the Egg's parents was a Shiny themselves. Pokémon Diamond and Pearl introduced a mechanic dubbed the "Masuda Method" by fans, named after Junichi Masuda, who implemented the concept in the games. If two Pokémon from alternate language versions of the games breed, they will have a 5 out of 8192 (roughly 0.06%) chance of hatching a Shiny from the resulting Egg, with later games having around a 1 in 683 (roughly 0.15%) chance. Masuda had no idea of the mechanic's fan-dubbed name until years after it was implemented. Diamond and Pearl also introduced the Poke Radar, which allowed for players to chain repeated encounters of the same species. Black 2 and White 2 introduced the Shiny Charm, an item that roughly triples the chance of encountering a Shiny.

Pokémon Sun and Moon included a feature called "SOS Battles", allowing players to continuously KO Pokémon in the span of one battle until a Shiny appeared. The series' previous usage of random encounters for Pokémon was changed in Pokémon: Let's Go, Pikachu! and Let's Go, Eevee!, which allowed players to see Pokémon, including Shinies, in the games' overworld. It also introduced "shiny chains", which increase the chance of encountering Shinies for each member of a given species caught in a row. Pokémon Legends: Arceus introduced an audio cue when a Shiny appears in the game's overworld near the player, which was later removed in the subsequent games Pokémon Scarlet and Violet. Scarlet and Violet also introduced a new mechanic, in which players could make sandwiches that increased the chances of encountering Shiny Pokémon.

=== Spin-offs ===
Spin-off media also incorporates Shiny Pokémon. They exist in Pokémon Go, where they have a 1 in 500 chance of appearing, significantly higher than in mainline games. Shiny Pokémon were introduced in Go with the introduction of Shiny Magikarp in 2017, with additional Shinies periodically introduced through in-game events. Special "Community Day" events also boost the odds of encountering a Shiny version of a given species significantly. The game Pokémon Shuffle features them in special limited time events, while Pokémon Masters EX has Shiny Pokémon being encounterable through an in-game Egg mechanic. In the Pokémon anime, protagonist Ash Ketchum captures a Shiny Noctowl, while, later in the series, he encounters a character who seeks to obtain Shiny forms of every species in existence. The game Pokémon: Magikarp Jump allows players to encounter Shiny Magikarp as one of the potential appearances their Magikarp can take. Shiny Magikarp can evolve into a Shiny Gyarados, though players are unable to use it afterward. Shinies are also obtainable in Pokémon Sleep.

The Pokémon Trading Card Game has repeatedly implemented Shiny Pokémon in various manners. "Shining Pokémon" were the first manner of Shiny Pokémon card, introduced in 2002. These cards have a special foil on the art of the Pokémon which makes the card shine. Pokémon Star cards, introduced in 2004, were successors to Shining Pokémon, but had their cards depicted with a holographic foil. Star Cards were released only briefly, and stopped being released in 2007, thus becoming immensely rare following their release. Shining Pokémon were later re-introduced in 2017, and remained in various manners afterward. A type of card dubbed "Baby Shiny Pokémon", were introduced in a later expansion, which depicted Shiny Pokémon without an art display that took up the whole card. Radiant Pokémon were later introduced, and functioned similarly to Shining Pokémon, though these depicted a holographic pattern along the entire card instead of just on the Pokémon.

== Reception ==
Due to the popularity of trying to obtain Shiny Pokémon, dedicated "hunters" emerged, who often spend many hours attempting to obtain specific Shiny Pokémon. In interviews with IGN, many hunters from the community believed that its popularity stemmed from the desire for the end result of a Shiny, a sentiment echoed by Polygon's Allegra Frank. Many fans play solely to hunt particular Shinies, which Sports Illustrated writer Ryan Woodrow believed required greater commitment and patience than other facets of the games. Some streamers partake in Shiny hunting, which garners considerable view counts online, though it can cause mental stress due to the focus needed to partake in the hunt while simultaneously keeping audiences entertained.

According to Polygon, Shiny Pokémon have become easier to obtain in more recent entries in the Pokémon franchise, which has caused a split in hunters, with some believing that Shinies obtained in more recent games are not "worth as much" as Shinies encountered in older games. Due to this, some have taken on more difficult hunts, with some attempting to obtain a "Living Dex", wherein they obtain every Pokémon in the franchise in their Shiny forms, while others have chosen to hunting down Pokémon with "marks", which yield special in-game honorifics that can be attached to a Pokémon. According to Sports Illustrated, others have attempted to individualize their Shinies by using specific Poké Balls to capture their Pokémon, though this has led to some criticizing others for using less rare or easier to use Poké Balls. Their introduction in Go has been considered controversial by Nintendo Life, as due to their high odds of being encountered in those games, many players believed that it has caused the value of Shinies to degrade overall.

The designs of Shiny Pokémon have often been critiqued. Woodrow believed that the best Shiny forms for Pokémon were ones that were "visually striking" and unique in comparison to the Pokémon's original color palette. Woodrow stated that he believed the series' designers were too concerned with keeping a particular species' "feel" intact, which resulted in weaker Shiny palettes that were not as interesting, and stated that the designers should try giving "a completely new take on an already great design." Ben Sledge, writing for TheGamer, believed that Shiny designs had gotten worse as the series progressed, especially in recent games such as Pokémon Scarlet and Violet.

A black-hat hacking group known as ShinyHunters is believed to have derived its alias from the mechanic.
