= Chipmunk (disambiguation) =

A chipmunk is a small, striped squirrel.

Chipmunk may also refer to:

- Alvin and the Chipmunks, a fictional musical group
- Audio time stretching and pitch scaling, known as The Chipmunk effect
- de Havilland Canada DHC-1 Chipmunk, a two-seat, propeller-driven training aircraft
- Chip 'n' Dale, Walt Disney cartoon chipmunks
- Chip (rapper), a British rapper formerly known as Chipmunk
- Chipmunk (software), a physics engine
- Chipmunk soul, a style of hip-hop music production
- A type of noise sometimes made by an internal combustion engine's wastegate
- A Thirteen-lined ground squirrel, sometimes incorrectly referred to as a chipmunk

== See also ==
- Chip Monck, an American lighting designer
