= Toryumon =

Toryumon or Tōryūmon may refer to:

- Toryumon (Último Dragón), a professional wrestling school and the associated professional wrestling promotions
- Dragon Gate, formerly Toryumon Japan, a Japanese professional wrestling promotion
- KOTC: Toryumon, a mixed martial arts event held on January 30, 2010 in Okinawa, Japan
- Toryumon, a 1994 arcade game
- Longmen (mythology), also known in Japan as Tōryūmon
