= Box2D =

Two-dimensional physics simulator engine

- Current Box2D logo

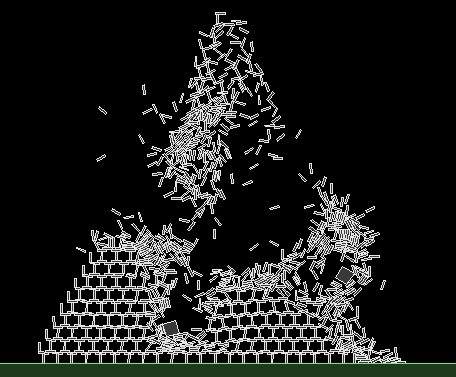
- Screenshot Box2D screenshot
- Developer: Erin Catto
- Release: September 11, 2007
- Stable release: 3.1.1 / June 4, 2025; 14 months ago
- Written in: C
- Operating system: OS independent
- Type: Middleware
- License: MIT (since version 2.4.0) zlib License
- Website: www.box2d.org
- Repository: github.com/erincatto/box2d

Box2D is a free and open-source 2D physics simulation game engine written in C by Erin Catto and published under the MIT license. It has been used in Crayon Physics Deluxe, Limbo, Rolando, Incredibots, Angry Birds, Tiny Wings, Shovel Knight, Transformice, Happy Wheels,, Noita, and many online Flash games, as well as Android and iOS games using the Cocos2d or Moscrif game engine and Solar2D framework. It has also been used in the Unity game engine and is available as an extension for the Scratch-based programming languages TurboWarp (in its Extension Gallery website) and PenguinMod (built-in extension).

== History ==
Box2D was first released as "Box2D Lite", a demonstration engine to accompany a physics presentation given by Erin Catto at GDC 2006. On September 11, 2007, it was released as open source on SourceForge. On January 17, 2010, Box 2D moved the project to Google Code for hosting. On July 12, 2015, hosting was moved again, this time to GitHub.

On March 6, 2008, version 2.0 was launched, introducing continuous collision detection and revamping the API.

On July 27, 2020, version 2.4 was launched, with a variety of changes, most notably the license was changed to the MIT License.

On Aug 12, 2024, version 3.0 was launched, rewriting the library entirely in C, overhauling the API, increasing single and multi-threaded performance, and changing to a more stable physics solver.

On Jun 29, 2026, the new 3D physics engine "Box3D" was announced on the Box2D website.

== Cross-platform availability ==
Box2D is itself written in platform-independent C (usable on any system with a C compiler available). The engine may be compiled in fixed point and floating point modes, and has been used on the Nintendo DS, Wii, and several mobile phones (including Android, BlackBerry 10 and iOS) as well as most major operating systems.

The engine has been ported to many other programming languages and environments, including Java, Adobe Flash (in ActionScript and Haxe languages), C#, Lua, JavaScript, and D. Bindings exist to use the compiled library from Python, DarkBASIC and BBC BASIC.

On October 30, 2009, it was announced that Box2D was being integrated into the (now older) Torque 2D game engine.

== Programs that use the engine ==
- BBC Basic for SDL, cross-platform version of BBC Basic
- BlitzBasic
- GameMaker: Studio, uses the engine for physics simulation.
- LibGDX, uses the physics engine for games and lighting.
- Stencyl, uses the physics engine for games, and allows export to Flash and iOS.
- Unity
- Construct2
- LÖVE, uses the physics engine for games
- Solar2D
- Clickteam Fusion 2.5
- Flame, Flutter game engine

== Features ==
Box2D performs constrained rigid body simulation. It can simulate bodies composed of convex polygons, circles, and edge shapes. Bodies are joined with joints and acted upon by forces. The engine also applies gravity, friction, and restitution.

Box2D's collision detection and resolution system consists of three pieces: an incremental sweep and prune broad phase, a continuous collision detection unit, and a stable linear-time contact solver. These algorithms allow efficient simulations of fast bodies and large stacks without missing collisions or causing instabilities.

== Related engines ==
An earlier version of the Box2D engine, now known as Box2D Lite, was released primarily for educational purposes, based on a series of yearly Game Developers Conference presentations that Erin Catto has given. Box2D Lite uses many of the same algorithms as Box2D, but has a smaller feature set.

The Chipmunk physics engine (written in C) and Phys2D (written in Java) are both partially based on Box2D Lite. The physics engine used in SpriteKit for iOS and OS X uses Box2D internally.

The LiquidFun physics engine is a fork of Box2D by Google, which adds fluid simulation to the engine.

LibGDX uses a Java wrapper around native Box2D code written in C as its physics engine.

== Articles ==
Itterheim and Wenderlich describe the usage of Box2D in the Cocos2d iPhone engine. An article in the Adobe Edge newsletter discusses the use of Box2D in Flash games.

== See also ==
- Chipmunk (software)
