= Super Mario Flashback =

- Developer: Flashback Team
- Director: Mors
- Artists: Neweegee; Cruise Elroy
- Composer: Can of Nothing
- Series: Super Mario (unofficial)
- Engine: GameMaker Studio
- Platform: Windows
- Genre: Platform

Super Mario Flashback is an upcoming platform game developed by Turkish developer Mors and the Flashback Team. It is a fan game based on Nintendo's Super Mario platformers, and serves as a modern reimagining of its standard gameplay, blending mechanics from both 2D and 3D Mario titles. It features completely overhauled pixel art, refined gameplay mechanics introducing new abilities, reworked level layouts based on levels from various official Mario games, additional bonus stages, and a host of other new content. As of 26 November 2025, the game is on hiatus with no set release or revival date.

== Gameplay ==
Super Mario Flashback combines the core mechanics of traditional 2D Super Mario games with elements introduced in the series' 3D entries, such as Mario's usual move-set and a health system similar to Super Mario 64 (1996) or Super Mario Galaxy (2007). The game features highly detailed, fluid pixel art animations for characters and enemies, distinguishing its visual style from official Nintendo titles.

The game works like Super Mario Bros. and Super Mario 3D World; the player must traverse through levels, in which they can collect a Green Star.

Levels are designed to be reinterpretations or remixes of stages from various official Mario games, including the original Super Mario Bros., Super Mario 64, and New Super Mario Bros., often featuring more complex layouts and multiple paths compared to the original 8-bit game. Mario utilizes classic power-ups like the Super Mushroom and Fire Flower, alongside others seen in demo versions. Controls are designed to be precise, with additions like an upward angled fireball shot and a slide move noted in demos. Demos offered graphical options, including frame rate settings for 30 or 60 frames per second.

== Development ==
Development of Super Mario Flashback started in the summer of 2014, led by Mors, a Turkish student developer who began making fan games around age nine. It was initially conceived as a side project potentially similar to Sonic Generations (2011), reinterpreting levels from different eras of Mario.

Mors initially used publicly available assets but later recruited collaborators to form the Flashback Team, including pixel artists Neweegee and Cruise Elroy, musician Can of Nothing, and level designer Darkonius, to create original assets. Due to increasing code complexity and a desire for a more polished, consistent art style, Mors decided to restart development sometime before late 2017, scrapping previous work except for the core concepts and building the game in a new engine with a new art direction. The game is developed using GameMaker: Studio.
