= Legendary Wars =

2011 video game

- Developer: Liv Games
- Engine: Cocos2d
- Platforms: iOS, Android
- Release: January 27, 2011
- Genre: Real-Time Strategy
- Mode: Single-player

Legendary Wars is an iOS strategy game developed by American studio Liv Games and released on January 27, 2011. It was followed by Monster Wars on January 27, 2012, and Stellar Wars on November 13, 2013. The game was unable to be updated to work with iOS 11 or above devices by Liv Games, but sometime in 2019, Liv Games gave GameClub the rights to work on an updated version of the game, where it would be a launch title for GameClub.

== Gameplay ==
=== The Basics ===
In Legendary Wars, there are a few different gamemodes, most of which utilize the progression that characters can receive. The main campaign includes at least one level of all of the gamemode styles except Arena.

The first and main gamemode of Legendary Wars are the Castle Defense sections. In these, you start with a castle to defend, and you choose what units do you want to bring, so long as you unlocked them. To train units, you need to collect gems from Miners, who can be summoned and will bring back gems after a few seconds, by then you collect the gems by tapping it or by letting the miners run back to the castle to deposit them automatically, which takes longer than manually tapping the gems. After clicking on a unit icon with sufficient gems a unit will be trained and that unit will enter a cooldown before you can train that specific unit again. You are able to control where those units can go, and you can give commands to units to move forward, stay back, or retreat, and these commands are either applied only to that specific unit type if selected, or to all units if you have not selected a unit. Each unit also has a special ability, which uses essence points earned by killing enemies, that perform different effects.

The side modes include a Sidescrolling mode where you do certain objectives with a set unit that constantly moves towards a direction, an Arena mode where you can only train each unit once and you have to kill a specific number of enemies, and more.

=== Progression ===
Progression involves two currencies earned by playing any mode: Gems and Moonstones.

Gems are the primary currency earned through gameplay and they are used to upgrade unit stats, essence, and the castle health. Moonstones are rarer, as they are only awarded once in certain levels per campaign difficulty playthrough, or once for every milestone hit in the sidemodes playable from the modes menu. Moonstones are used for more crucial and gamechanging upgrades, which include upgrading a unit's tier, unlocking certain units, unlocking a different ability and more stat upgrades, certain castle upgrades, or improved spells. Upgrades will affect any gamemode except sidescrollers, where the unit provided will always have the same stats.

Beating the game once will unlock the next difficulty, which is more akin to a New Game Plus mode than a traditional difficulty setting, and will go up to Monster difficulty, the fourth difficulty level. Each new difficulty raises the damage and health of enemies, but in return, give you an opportunity to earn more moonstones.

=== Monetization ===
Legendary Wars normally costed $2.99 to $0.99 depending on when you bought it, and even went free on some occasions. It also has in-app purchases which allow you to buy more moonstones with real money. Later on these iAP also awarded gems with the moonstones, and a gem doubler, which doubles the amount of gems earned in levels outside of gems you collect, was sold for $2.99. At some point early on in the game's lifespan, you could refer up to 3 friends to buy the game, and each referred purchase would earn you 3 moonstones. For a long while as well, you could click links to their social media, or a special link every time a new update was released, that generally would earn you 500 gems or 1 moonstone (usually 1 moonstone for special links). After the game was rereleased by GameClub, while the game can be downloaded for free the only monetization is subscribing to GameClub to gain full access to the game, as non-subscribers may only play the first four levels to get a taste of the game.

== Development ==
The development of Legendary Wars first began in 2009 when Orian Livnat and two of his friends brainstormed ideas for a game. Previously, Orian searched for a games development job in 2008 after quitting retail at GameStop and acquiring a business degree, but was unable to find a job. Because of this, Orian chose to develop the game on the iPhone, because he contacted many game companies, but heard nothing back from them, and iOS had a low barrier of entry. Originally, Legendary Wars was prototyped as a "musical physics space puzzler" known as "Protostar", but after they listened to the music they developed, which according to Casey McGuire, is the track for Frostburn, and taking into account the games Orian Livnat heavily played at the time, the game was shifted to become an "epic strategy rpg war defense game." Some of the titles that inspired the shift was titles like Cartoon Wars, which enjoyed immense popularity, and titles that Liv played at the time, ranging from RTS classics such as Dune II and Warcraft 2, indie hits like Castle Crashers and Plants Vs. Zombies, and the aesthetic of Lord of the Rings. On the other hand, lead art designer Felix Embree quit working at Blizzard to work at Liv Games. Lack of work due to the recession helped push many of the developers to focus on Legendary Wars. Within four months, they put together a demo to recruit members, thus forming the full dev team as Liv Games by the spring of 2010. The remaining development of the game took 10 months, leading to Legendary Wars launching on January 27, 2011.

For Legendary Wars, the engine of choice was Cocos2d, while the code written in Objective C, and C. Orian looking back would have used Unity instead of Cocos2d due to the ease of getting the game on multiple platforms. Legendary Wars runs natively on all iOS devices below iOS 11, and it received an Android port on February 11, 2014, that was developed by Apportable. On March 26, 2014, Legendary Wars received a kindle port as well.

=== Post-release updates ===
After launching Legendary Wars, Liv Games added a plethora of updates to Legendary Wars, up until December 3, 2013. Updates did a variety of things, such as add full support for newer devices and their technology, to adding content. Even when there were less than 100 sales of the game every day, Liv chose to stick through and continue updating the game, as he believed that the way to create a success was to slowly build a community around your game. This philosophy paid off, as the 2.0 update generated unprecedented interest in Liv Games, according to Google.

The most important update, and largest content patch, Version 2.0, released on November 22, 2012. It added Tier 5 unit upgrades, four new units, 21 new campaign levels, and a new gamemode called Legendary Challenges, which is a new sidemode that includes 60 new levels of the Action type. It also overhauled many previous levels with new tier monsters from Monster Wars, added a hero selection screen before the start of a level to choose what units you bring to a level, and added iPhone iOS 6 support.

Legendary Wars was re-released by GameClub on September 3, 2019, allowing the game to be played on an iOS 11 or greater device. Along with newcomers requiring a subscription to play the full game, many minor changes were made to the game, such as spells having independent cooldowns of one another, units requiring half as many upgrades to max out, but receiving twice the stats as before, and all units no longer require moonstones to unlock the tier 1 version.

=== Music ===
The soundtrack of Legendary Wars are orchestral tracks that were composed by Casey McGuire, consisting of eight tracks, one of which was added post-launch.

== Reception ==
=== Legendary Wars ===
Reception

Aggregate score
| Aggregator | Score |
|---|---|
| Metacritic | 80/100 |

Review scores
| Publication | Score |
|---|---|
| 148apps | 70 |
| Appsafari | 80 |
| AppSpy | 80 |
| GamePro | 90 |
| Gamezebo | 90 |
| Multiplayer.it | 84 |
| Pocket Gamer UK | 70 |
| Slide to Play | 75 |
| TouchArcade | 80 |

Legendary Wars has a Metacritic rating of 80% based on nine critic reviews, which is a mostly positive reception. Most of the reviews praised the game for its mashups of many genres, most notably of the RTS, RPG, and Castle Defense elements, and for the amount of content in the game. Castle Defense games generally do not offer control over your units, as you normally just sent troops down one lane with no agency over what they do. Reviewers mentioned that the ability to control your units, over three lanes, provided one of the most complex castle defense experiences. Legendary Wars also offers many levels with some levels being what you wouldn't expect from a Castle Defense game, giving a lot of content with a good amount of variety. However, Legendary Wars was also criticized for its excessive micromanaging and lackluster AI.

While exact download figures of the game are unknown, Legendary Wars was successful enough to self-fund the company long enough for the development of Monster Wars. In addition, by September 16, 2011, Legendary Wars had over 1 million downloads. When Version 2.0 of Legendary Wars was released, it was praised for having fixed most of the problems people originally had with the game at the time of the update. By then, a button to have units form up separately into different lanes was added, allowing better control of the units, and you were able to select what unit type you wanted to command.

Monetarily, the game broke even within two months of release. By the time the non-GameClub version of the game was removed from the App Store, Legendary Wars had 29,802 user reviews on the app store. Liv Games also had enough to release two similar games, Monster Wars, and Stellar Wars, and attempted to develop three more games in the Legendary Wars ip, which more than likely indicates that the franchise was fairly successful at the time.

=== Monster Wars ===
Monster Wars has a Metacritic score of 76% based on five critic reviews.

=== Stellar Wars ===
Stellar Wars has a Metacritic score of 84% based on five critic reviews. Gamezebo said "Stellar Wars looks and plays like a greatly improved version of Legendary Wars, the development team's previous release, with a lot of new units and upgrades to toy around with." Apple'N'Apps said "Stellar Wars delivers a deluxe wide-ranging gaming experience that is a should buy for some engaging strategy." Pocket Gamer UK wrote "Stellar Wars is a solid sequel to Legendary Wars, righting some of the wrongs and providing a captivating new setting for the strategic action." 148Apps said "Stellar Wars excels thanks to the immense variety of the gameplay scenarios it presents. " Arcade Sushi wrote "Gamers who crave for a difficult epic should definitely check out Stellar Wars."

== Future plans and cut concepts ==
According to Casey McGuire, Liv Games wanted to release Legendary Wars for PC, but because Legendary Wars was primarily built on iOS technology, there were coding issues with trying to port the games. So far, a PC port is not in the works. Orian Liv has stated in an interview that he wanted to have a skeletal system that allows for more compact and smooth animations, and the ability to visually (and mechanically) swap weapons, but the technology used at the time did not let this happen. However, Wizardlings, and later Stellar Wars, were finally able to implement a skeletal system for units which utilizes flash, although it did not implement a multiple weapon system. Liv also wanted to eventually incorporate PvP and Co-op in the series while working on Legendary Wars, but that has yet to happen. Group specials were another concept Liv wanted to add, but like a skeletal system and Multiplayer, that concept was too technologically ambitious for Liv and his team at the time.
