= Pokétoon =

Japanese original net animation (ONA) series

- Logo
- Original net animation

Pokétoon
- Released: June 5, 2020 – August 19, 2026
- Runtime: 1–17 minutes
- Episodes: 22

Pokétoon: The Pokémon Cartoon Animation is an original net animation (ONA) series featuring different kinds of short animations with different Pokémon. They first aired on June 5, 2020, on the Japanese Pokémon YouTube channel, and later released on Pokémon TV in English on August 25, 2022, and later on the English Pokémon YouTube channel in Fall 2022.

The first short, Scraggy and Mimikyu which released on June 5, 2020. After a year, the second short named as The Pancham Who Wants to Be a Hero was released on May 5, 2021. After some days, several additional episodes were announced on May 10, 2021, and ultimately there were a total of 8 episodes.

== Episodes ==
No.	Title	Directed by	Original release date	English air date	Ref.
1	"Scraggy and Mimikyu"; Transliteration: "Zuruggu to Mimikkyu" (Japanese: ズルッグとミミッキュ)	Taku Inoue	June 5, 2020	June 17, 2022	
After a Scraggy is passed by a luggage-bearing vehicle on the way to a train, it notices that the vehicle is dropping Poké Beans while it moves. So, Scraggy begins to follow the vehicle, eating the entire path of Poké Beans. However, another vehicle pushes Scraggy into the train while it is distracted. After being launched into the train, the Pokémon continues to follow and eat the path of Poké Beans inside the train. Eventually, it locates the bag that dropped the Poké Beans, which is revealed to be the Pokémon Mimikyu. Scared of the Mimikyu, Scraggy begins attacking it while hiding in a suitcase, and the two Pokémon eventually begin wrestling. After grabbing Mimikyu and releasing that its body is full of Poké Beans, Scraggy looks under its cloth. This shocks Scraggy enough that it runs through the train and bursts out, ending up rolling down a hill and landing alongside Mimikyu. After Scraggy attempts to eat the Poké Beans in Mimikyu, it begins chasing Scraggy over the hillside.
2	"The Pancham Who Wants to Be a Hero"; Transliteration: "Hero ni Naritai Yanchamu" (Japanese: ヒーローになりたいヤンチャム)	Junichi Yamamoto	May 5, 2021	June 24, 2022	
A lone Pancham that lives on a mountain constantly trains to be a hero like the Arcanine that saved it years ago. Meanwhile, a young boy from a village near the mountain where Pancham resides hears about the Pokémon on the television. Despite others saying that Pancham is too far away to be caught, the boy sets out and looks for it. Seeing the boy approach, Pancham hides from him. After night falls and the boy has yet to find Pancham, he reveals that he wants Pancham's help to rescue his father, who is stuck inside of a mine after the entrance collapsed. This convinces the Pancham to allow the boy to catch it. At the mine, the Pancham, previously scared to evolve due to people being scared of it, is forced to hold up a boulder while a hot geyser springs toward it. This forces it to remove its Everstone and evolve into Pangoro. This makes the Pokémon strong enough to save everyone in the mine, and it finally becomes a hero.
3	"Blossom's Dream"; Transliteration: "Yume no Tsubomi" (Japanese: ユメノツボミ)	Shingo Yamashita	June 4, 2021	July 1, 2022	
A young girl named Blossom aims to be a Pokémon Trainer like her father, though her mother believes she is not yet ready. Since the family's Charizard is not in shape to battle, she goes out alone to catch a Pokémon of her own. She finds a male Nidoran that is about to be attacked by an Arbok, and after the Nidoran defeats the Arbok, she helps treat its injuries. While eating berries with the Nidoran, its parents, a Nidoqueen and Nidoking arrive angered at Blossom, and they begin following her back to the village. Once they reach the village, a group of people from the village send out their Pokémon to fight the Nidoran's parents. Blossom then elists the Charizard to help deter Nidoran's parents, after which they allow Blossom to keep the Nidoran, and Blossom's parents allow her to set out on her adventure.
4	"Wait for Me, Magikarp"; Transliteration: "Mattete ne! Koiking" (Japanese: まっててね！コイキング)	Cédric Hérole	July 2, 2021	July 8, 2022	
A young boy plays a flute in order to befriend a wild Magikarp. After arriving home, tha Magikarp is not allowed, so he takes it to the Pokémon day care. At the day care, the Magikarp reminisces about the boy and his music. When it seem the boy returns to the day care, the Magikarp is excited to see him, but the boy turns out to be a different trainer with a Psyduck, leaving Magikarp disappointed and thinking the boy forgot about him. However, the boy suddenly appears and begin to play the flute, causing the Magikarp to become happy and evolve into a Gyarados. The boy and Pokemon are then happily reunited.
5	"The Slugma-Powered Home"; Transliteration: "The Warm and Cozy Magmag House" (Japanese: ぽかぽかマグマッグハウス)	Kazuhiko Yabumoto and Jun Ishikawa	August 5, 2021	July 15, 2022	
A young girl named Anna goes to visit her grandparents for the night. She learns that a Slugma travels through pipes in their house to heat it up. Anna attempts to talk to the shy Slugma, but it keeps moving around the house. After thanking and complimenting the Slugma, it lets out puffs of smoke to express its happiness and no longer runs away from her.
6	"Help! I've Turned into a Gengar"; Transliteration: "I Turned Into a Gangar!" (Japanese: ゲンガーになっちゃった！？)	Tatsurō Kawano, Akiko Watanabe and Natsuki Yamada	September 10, 2021	July 21, 2022	
After class at an elementary school, Hilary's classmates dare her to climb to the top of the Haunted Twilight Stairs, which are rumored to turn someone into a ghost if they stay for too long. When she reaches the top, she falls unconscious and awakens as a Gengar, and various ghost Pokémon talk to her. She hears her friends exploring the empty school, but when she attempts to follow them, she keeps accidentally scaring them (to the amusement of the other Pokémon). The school closes, and the ghosts and Hilary run out of the school so they aren't trapped by the purple sludge that erupts at night. Hilary's friends attempt to run out, but are trapped by the sludge. Hilary is able to save them by speaking up to command the frightened Pokémon to pull out her friends. Hilary follows her friends out of the school, turning back to a human. She is then bathed by a glowing light, and returns to the top of the stairs, where she truly joins her friends and they all head home together.
7	"Snorunt's Summer Vacation"; Transliteration: "Blizzard on a Summer Holiday" (Japanese: ふぶきのなつやすみ)	Masanobu Hiraoka	October 8, 2021	July 29, 2022	
Kino heads out on a hot summer day to meet up with his friends Bill and Nathan in their secret base. Suddenly, the temperature drops and it starts snowing. The three see that the snow is coming out of a cave and enter it, finding a Snorunt. They take it to a Pokémon Center, as Snorunt normally live in colder climates. As they had to reveal where they found the displaced Pokémon, their secret base is no longer a secret. The boys decide to travel with the Snorunt to return it to its natural habitat, then convert their secret base into a research center.
8	"Jigglypuff's Song"; Transliteration: "Purin's Song" (Japanese: プリンのうた)	Yū Satō and Mizuki Saitō	December 28, 2021	August 25, 2022	
Peaches meets a crying Jigglypuff with spiky hair and befriends it. Her classmate Alba, who also has a Jigglypuff, tells Peaches that Jigglypuff are known for their beautiful singing. Peaches asks her Jigglypuff to sing after hearing Alba's sing, but it runs away, as it doesn't want to share its deep-voiced singing with her. Peaches finds Jigglypuff and tells it that it's okay for it to not sing. Alba thinks it won't sing because it hates Peaches. Wanting to prove that it loves her, the Jigglypuff begins to sing. Peaches finds it incredible, giving Jigglypuff the confidence to continue singing. Alba and her Jigglypuff also come to like its singing.
9	"Pawmi, Pawmo, Pawmot"; Transliteration: "Pamo, Pamot, Parmot!" (Japanese: パモパモットパーモット！)	Kodai Sato	September 18, 2024	June 25, 2026	TBA
10	"Diary of an Angry Primeape"; Transliteration: "Angry Okorizaru Observation Diary" (Japanese: 怒りのオコリザル観察日記)	Seishirō Nagaya	September 25, 2024	July 2, 2026	TBA
11	"A Clodsire Mass Outbreak"; Transliteration: "Mass Outbreak of Dooh?" (Japanese: ドオー大量発生ちゅう？)	Ochanoko	October 2, 2024	July 9, 2026	TBA
12	"My Gogoat Journey"; Transliteration: "Riding on Gogoat" (Japanese: ゴーゴートに乗って)	Miwa Sasaki	October 9, 2024	July 16, 2026	TBA
13	"I Love Ducklett"; Transliteration: "I Love Koaruhie!" (Japanese: コアルヒーだいすき！)	Mizuka Takahashi	October 16, 2024	July 23, 2026	TBA
14	"The Chansey Chase"; Transliteration: "Playing Tag on a Lucky Safari!?" (Japanese: ラッキーなサファリでおにごっこ！？)	Haruka Fujita	October 23, 2024	July 30, 2026	TBA
15	"The Legend of Capsakid"; Transliteration: "Romantic Spice - Capsaiji Legend" (Japanese: Romanticスパイス カプサイジ伝説)	Takashi Yamamoto	October 30, 2024	August 6, 2026	TBA
16	"A Tale of Two Charcadet"; Transliteration: "Childhood Friend Carbou" (Japanese: 幼なじみのカルボウ)	Haruka Yutoku	November 20, 2024	August 13, 2026	TBA
17	"Murkrow and the Nighttime Adventure"; Transliteration: "Yamikarasu and the Midnight Adventure" (Japanese: ヤミカラスと真夜中のぼうけん)	Satoru Fujimoto	February 14, 2025	August 20, 2026	TBA
18	"Bonding with Kangaskhan"; Transliteration: "Keep an Eye on Her, Garura" (Japanese: めがはなせないね ガルーラ)	Takuya Hosogane	October 3, 2025	October 24, 2025	TBA
19	"Another Day with Gardevoir"; Transliteration: "Tomorrow with Sirnight" (Japanese: 明日もサーナイトと)	Yoshihide Ibata	October 24, 2025	December 20, 2025	TBA
20	"Sing! Dance! Altaria!"; Transliteration: "Sing! Dance! Tyltalis!" (Japanese: うたう！おどる！チルタリス！)	Unknown	February 13, 2026	June 18, 2026	TBA
21	"Summer Days with Wartortle"; Transliteration: "Kameil and the Continuation of Summer" (Japanese: カメールと、夏のつづき)	Unknown	August 12, 2026	November 13, 2026	TBA
22	"Mischievous Whimsicott? Not on Mabosstiff's Watch!"; Transliteration: "Will Mafitiff Let the Prankster Elfuun Off?" (Japanese: いたずらエルフーンとさせるかマフィティフ)	Unknown	August 19, 2026	August 19, 2026	TBA
