= Magikarp and Gyarados =

Pokémon species

- Pokémon characters
- Magikarp (bottom) and Gyarados (top) as they appear in Pokémon Legends: Arceus
- First appearance: Pokémon Red and Blue
- Designed by: Ken Sugimori (Gyarados, finalized Magikarp)
- Voiced by: Unshō Ishizuka

In-universe information
- Species: Pokémon
- Type: Water (Magikarp); Water and Flying (Gyarados); Water and Dark (Mega Gyarados)

Magikarp (/ˈmædʒɪkɑːrp/), known in Japan as Koiking (Japanese: コイキング, Hepburn: Koikingu), and Gyarados (/ˈɡærədoʊs/; Japanese: ギャラドス, Hepburn: Gyaradosu) are a pair of Pokémon species in the Pokémon franchise. Both Pokémon first appeared in Pokémon Red and Blue, going on to appear in almost every subsequent installment in the series. Magikarp is a weak, fish-like Pokémon, who is inept and almost useless in battle, while Gyarados is the evolved form of Magikarp, boasting significant strength and power.

Since their debut, Magikarp and Gyarados have received mostly positive responses. While Gyarados and its evolution from Magikarp were met with positive commentary, many were more mixed over Magikarp's inability in battle and overall pointlessness. However, Magikarp's weakness has been met with praise. Both have been cited as among the most well-known Pokémon of all time.

== Design and characteristics ==
Magikarp and Gyarados are a pair of species of fictional creatures called Pokémon created for the Pokémon media franchise. Developed by Game Freak and published by Nintendo, the Japanese franchise began in 1996 with the video games Pokémon Red and Green for the Game Boy, which were later released in North America as Pokémon Red and Blue in 1998. In these games and their sequels, the player assumes the role of a Trainer whose goal is to capture and use the creatures' special abilities to combat other Pokémon. Some Pokémon can transform into stronger species through a process called evolution via various means, such as exposure to specific items. Each Pokémon has one or two elemental types, which define its advantages and disadvantages when battling other Pokémon. A major goal in each game is to complete the Pokédex, a comprehensive Pokémon encyclopedia, by capturing, evolving, and trading with other Trainers to obtain individuals from all Pokémon species.

Magikarp are small, fish-like Pokémon, and appear to be inspired by usual types of carp, such as the common carp and asian carp. Gyarados, on the other hand, is a Pokémon whose design is inspired by dragons, specifically dragons seen in Chinese mythology. The concept of Magikarp evolving into Gyarados is based on the Chinese mythological tale of carp leaping over the Dragon Gate. According to the legend, carp that leap over a legendary waterfall called the Dragon Gate are rewarded for their perseverance and transformed into dragons.

Magikarp and Gyarados were two of 151 different designs conceived by Game Freak's character development team and finalized by Ken Sugimori for the first generation of Pocket Monsters games Red and Green, which were localized outside Japan as Pokémon Red and Blue. In the beta for the game, Gyarados had a vastly different design, which resembled an eyeless, worm-like creature with sharp teeth. Nintendo decided to give the various Pokémon species "clever and descriptive names" related to their appearance or features when translating the game for western audiences as a means to make the characters more relatable to American children. As a result, Gyarados's beta name was "Skulkraken", a combination of "skull" or "skulk" and "kraken", but in the final release the original Japanese name was used. Scrapped names in the game files of Pokémon Scarlet and Violet, named "OKAKINGU" and "OKAGYARADOSU," indicated that alternate forms of Magikarp and Gyarados were considered for inclusion in the games, and were scrapped in favor of Toedscool and Toedscruel.

Magikarp are incredibly common and plentiful, but notoriously weak, and are only capable of learning a select few moves by level up. They are notable for their ability to flop around on land and can leap up to seven feet in the air. By contrast, Gyarados are large, blue, snake-like Pokémon. They are well-known for their power and bad tempers, and they frequently go on violent rampages. Magikarp and Gyarados were both voiced by Unshō Ishizuka in Japanese.

== Appearances ==
=== In the video games ===
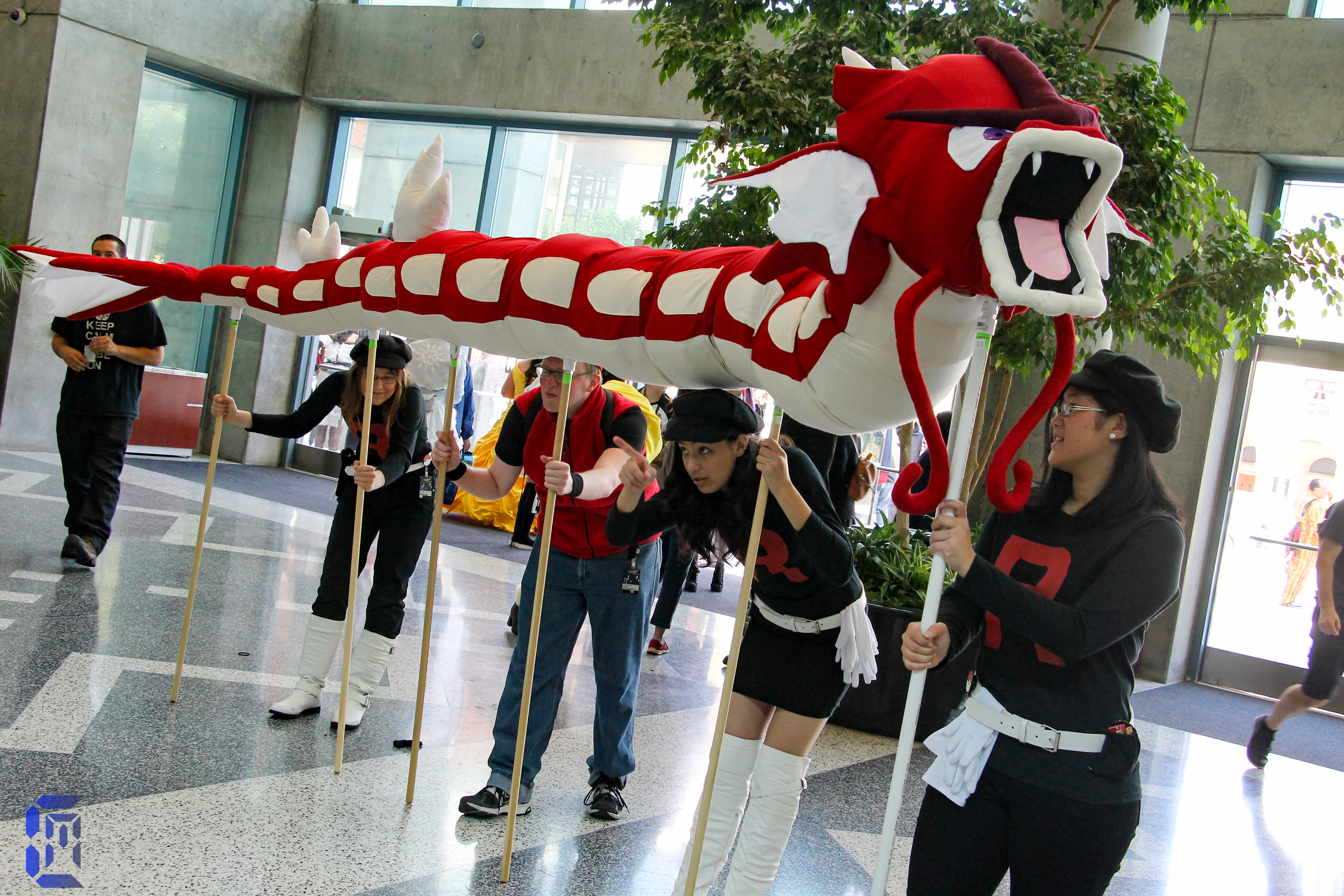
Cosplay of a Shiny Gyarados at FanimeCon 2017. The Red Gyarados has been described as iconic.

Magikarp and Gyarados first appear in Pokémon Red and Blue. They can be commonly obtained by fishing, though one notable NPC will sell a Magikarp to the player before fishing is available for the player character. In their sequels, Pokémon Gold and Silver, a specially colored "Shiny" Gyarados that is red appears in the game's Lake of Rage area as a boss opponent. It must be captured or defeated in order for the story to progress. The pair have appeared in many subsequent games in the series, including Pokémon Ruby, Sapphire, Diamond, Pearl, Sun, Moon, Sword, Shield, Scarlet, and Violet. In Pokémon X and Y, Gyarados received a Mega Evolution, which changes its Flying type into the Dark type.

The pair make many appearances in spin-offs, including the Pokémon Snap games, the Pokémon Mystery Dungeon series, Pokémon Café ReMix, Pokémon Unite, Pokémon Go, Pokkén Tournament and Pokémon TCG Pocket. In Pokémon Stadium, Magikarp featured in its own mini-game called "Magikarp Splash", in which players must Splash high enough to hit the button at the top of the screen as many times as it can. Magikarp later received its own mobile game, Pokémon: Magikarp Jump, in which players must compete against opponents to see whose Magikarp can jump the highest. Magikarp can evolve into Gyarados in game, though this is only an easter egg.

=== In the anime ===
Magikarp has appeared several times, most notably as the subject of a running gag in which a salesman attempts to trick Team Rocket into buying Magikarp in various guises, the first one being in Battle Aboard the St. Anne. In Pokémon Shipwreck, the salesman succeeds in selling them one, but James kicked his Magikarp out of frustration, causing it to evolve into a Gyarados and attack him. Ash's travelling companion Misty owns a Gyarados, while Ash's companion Goh owns a Magikarp that is significantly stronger than the average of its species. The character Lance captured the Red Gyarados, and it is used as one of his primary Pokémon when the character returned in Pokémon Journeys: The Series. A special Pokétoon short was released that starred Magikarp. The Red Gyarados featured in an episode of Pokémon Generations.

=== In other media ===
In Pokémon Adventures, a Gyarados is owned by Misty, who eventually trades it to Red, who uses it as part of his team. It is later temporarily given to Blue, though it is eventually given back to Red. A Magikarp appears in the 2019 live action film Detective Pikachu, where Detective Pikachu threw a Magikarp to help battle a rogue Charizard. It evolved into Gyarados in order to win the fight.

== Promotion and reception ==
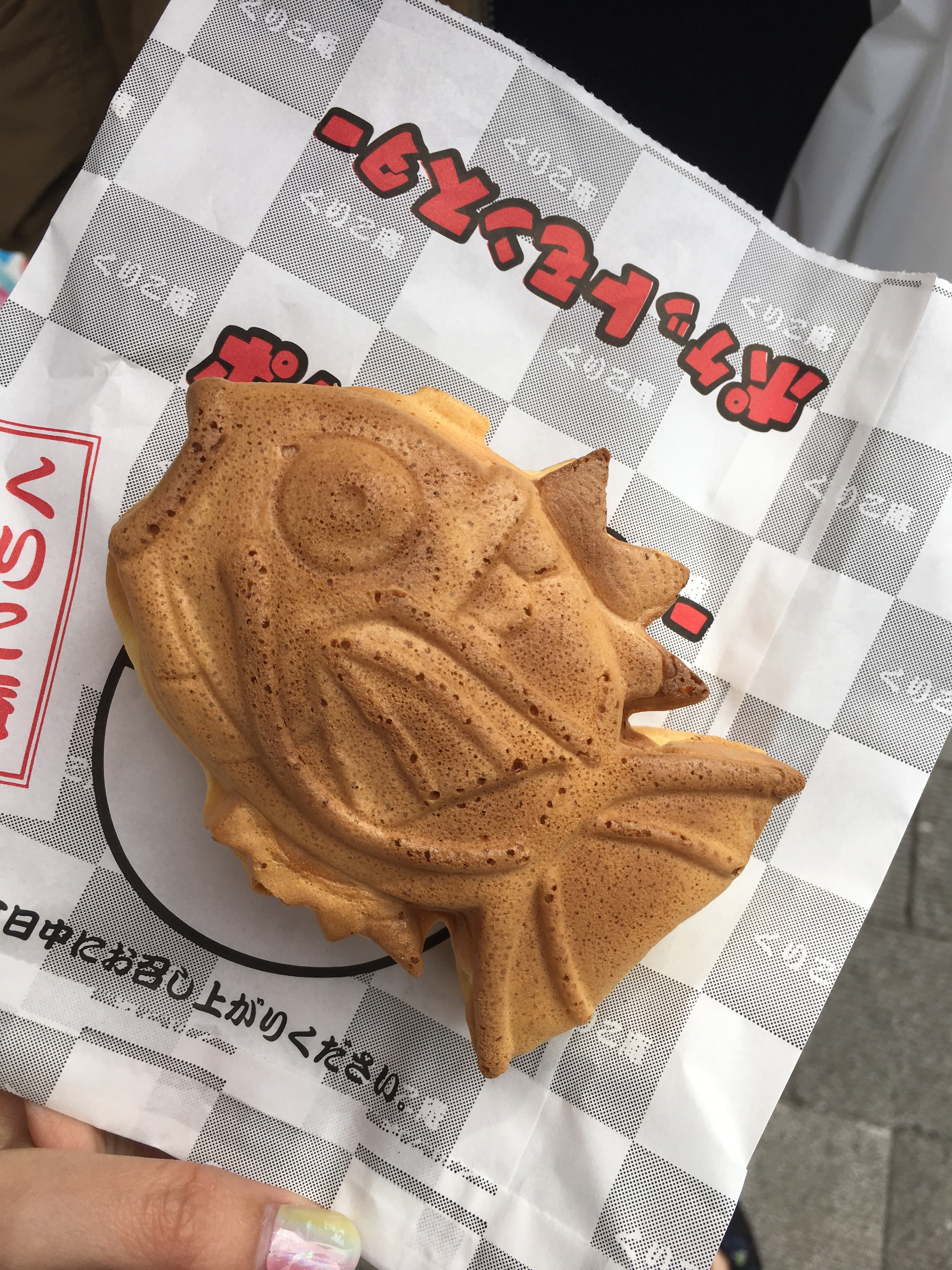
A Magikarp-shaped taiyaki served in a restaurant in Akihabara, Tokyo, Japan in 2017.

A variety of merchandise depicting Magikarp and Gyarados have been produced. Pokefuta featuring the duo were released in Japan's Chūbu region. Toys, plushies, jewelry, and cards in the Pokémon Trading Card Game have been produced. Magikarp was cosplayed by a baby on Honolulu Comic book convention being described by Game Informer as "the cutest cosplay ever." In 2022, Magikarp featured on the side of a jet.

Magikarp has been regarded as one of the weakest Pokémon in the series, as well as one of the worst Pokémon of all time. Its weakness has resulted in beating the game with it proving to be a popular challenge among fans, and its weakness has further been highlighted in official media, which often pokes fun at its own uselessness. In Pokémon Sword and Shield, Magikarp was one of the most hated Pokémon due to in game NPCs and some players using Magikarp during the game's multiplayer raids. IGN regarded it as being "comic relief" until it evolves into Gyarados. Gyarados itself has been highlighted for its power, being cited as a top design in the series. Khee Hoon Chan of Paste said it "exemplifies power through perseverance," while TheGamer writer Cian Maher praised it as an iconic staple of the series. Magikarp's evolution into Gyarados has been analyzed for its symbolism and representation of Japanese mythology.

The book Gaming Cultures and Place in Asia-Pacific cited Magikarp as an "example of a common recurring and weak element" in the games, whose presence rather than function was to "emphasize the exclusivity and strength of other, rarer creatures for players to find". Khee Hoon Chan of Paste analyzed Magikarp's role in the games, stating that "Magikarp fits within this universe not as a fighting machine, but as a sarcastic nemesis to the tremendous power of Gyarados and other absurdly powerful Pokémon. This is precisely why it is so memorable." They highlighted its comedic relief, stating that because it was so bad, it inspired discussion about its true purpose and potential hidden secrets it might have. They further stated that while it was useless in battle, it was designed as such and was a well-thought out creation in conjunction with Gyarados. Its weakness has resulted in Magikarp being described as a lovable Pokémon. Its appearance in Magikarp Jump was praised for helping to highlight the series' core themes of bonding with Pokemon, with The Verge writer Megan Farokhmanesh stating that "despite centering on a pokémon that most view as a punchline, [it] does a great job in fostering a sense of affection for the fish you're raising. The more I watch my Magikarp bash its face into a punching bag, the more I love that little idiot. It's doing the best it can. And when it jumps its way to victory, I feel proud. Genuinely." The game was also praised by Julie Muncey of Wired for making the joke of Magikarp's uselessness endearing to players.
