= IncrediBots =

- The IncrediBots title screen.
- Publisher: Grubby Games
- Designers: Ryan Clark, Oliver Trujillo, Matt Parry, Michael Pines
- Engine: Box2D Physics Engine
- Platform: Web browser
- Release: October 31, 2008
- Genre: Physics simulation

IncrediBots is a series of physics simulation games produced by Canadian studio Grubby Games, and was later purchased by Big Fish Games. It uses the Box2D physics engine, which allows two-dimensional objects to interact realistically in a two-dimensional space.

== Gameplay ==
Players create simple geometric shapes and connect them with "joints" to form more complex objects, known as "bots", which can be controlled with keyboard input or dragged with the mouse. Bots are created in edit mode, and can be played with and tested in play mode. Players can also create challenge levels with player-defined goals and limitations.

The game contains a tutorial, a freeform sandbox mode, and challenge levels (exclusive to Incredibots 2).

Bots, challenges, and replays (videos recorded in play mode) can be saved as file types exclusive to Incredibots, or as .txt files, the former of which could be uploaded on the Incredibots servers.

== User accounts ==
Prior to October 2010, Players could create accounts on the Incredibots servers, where they could store and submit their bots, challenges, and scores for other users to download and play with. In October 2010, the servers became inaccessible, and the existing URL redirected to the Incredibots forums. On November 20, 2010, all existing accounts, and their contents, were deleted, and new accounts created on the new IncrediFriends/IncrediBots website would only work on the forums.

== Supporters ==
All three Incredibots games are free-to-play, but users could donate money in the first two games to become an "IncrediBots supporter", and would gain access to additional features as a result.

The IncrediBots supporter payment system (provided by Plimus, now known as BlueSnap) has been dissolved, with winning forum contests being the only way to become a supporter. The open-source versions of Incredibots 1 and 2 offer all supporter features for free.

== Development ==
IncrediBots started as a simple physics engine (Box2D) coupled with a limited user interface. It was publicly released on October 31, 2008. On December 19, IncrediBots supporter features were implemented. On January 9, 2009, IncrediBots beta testing ended. On March 17, 2009, IncrediBots 2 was released for private beta testing.

Grubby Games believes "...that something is being forgotten in this era of multimillion-dollar games with cutting-edge graphics. As lifelong gamers, we understand that flashy graphics are much less important than solid gameplay." After the open-source version of IncrediBots was released, two users called "jayther" and "pokeybit" have handled the technical side of managing IncrediBots.

== IGF Nomination ==
Incredibots was nominated as a finalist in the 11th National Independent Games Festival.

== IncrediBots 2 ==
On March 17, 2009, IncrediBots 2 was opened to paying supporters for testing. It was nearly identical to the first game, but with additional quality of life features and a more advanced sandbox mode. On June 19, 2009, IncrediBots 2 was opened to non-supporter players.

A variant of IncrediBots 2 branded "Jaybit Edition" continues to receive updates. It introduced a method of sharing creations without the server network, as well as additional features in the challenge editor.

== Server closure and change of ownership ==
The IncrediBots servers were shut down on November 19, 2010, and an open-source version was released to the public, with all paid features accessible for free. Additionally, a new forum was made to replace the old one. On March 31, 2011, jayther announced that the staff of the forums now owned the trademark of IncrediBots, as well as the domain name. On March 31, 2011, the new forums were moved to the original domain of the old forums.

== IncrediBots 3 ==
On October 8, 2011, jayther publicly announced on the Incredibots forums that his "business application using box2d" called "Project Legato", was actually the early stages of IncrediBots 3. He also announced that he would be presenting it at Minecon 2011, which also hosted the official release of Minecraft.

The game runs on the newest version of Box2D, and has new features including water, customizable sandbox terrain, a new GUI, and a new online file saving system.

On February 29, 2012, jayther and the IncrediBots administrators secretly added IncrediBots 3 to the IncrediBots website. The game is currently in a public beta stage.

== IncrediBots HTML5 port ==
In 2018, user TheDerf was working on porting the game to HTML5 using the programming language TypeScript. As of 2021, the HTML5 port supports all core features of IncrediBots 2.23 CE (the open-source version). The author attempted to make the port as faithful to the original Actionscript 3 code as possible, including an effort to replicate the simulation glitches in the Flash version. The source code of the port is hosted on GitHub, where the game can also be accessed to play.

== Robot Mania ==
In December 2022, user SDDFFDDS created an IncrediBots-inspired game Robot Mania: Physics Sandbox, and released it on iOS, iPadOS, and MacOS platforms. As of 2023, Robot Mania supports all core features of the original IncrediBots 2, including challenges and global leaderboards. The game utilizes an updated version of the Box2D physics engine, and uses a public cloud storage to host player robots.
