= YoYo Games =

Scottish software development company

YoYo Games Ltd.
- Type: Subsidiary
- Industry: Video games
- Founded: 2007; 19 years ago
- Founders: Michel Cassius; Sandy Duncan; Spencer Hyman; James North-Hearn
- Headquarters: Dundee, Scotland, UK
- Key people: Russell Kay (Senior Product Director)
- Products: GameMaker
- Parent: Playtech (2015–2021); Opera (2021–present)
- Website: gamemaker.io

YoYo Games is a Scottish software development company based in Dundee, Scotland. From February 2015 to January 2021, the company was owned by Playtech; afterwards, it was sold to Opera to launch its new gaming division.

== History ==
YoYo Games was founded in 2007 by Michel Cassius, Sandy Duncan, Spencer Hyman and James North-Hearn, former entertainment and video game industry executives. Duncan was appointed chief executive officer of the company. On 26 January 2007, Mark Overmars announced his partnership with a company based in Dundee, Scotland, called YoYo Games.

The company established its European office in Dundee in May 2010 by opening an office within Abertay University with two team members. The company currently employs more than 25 employees. YoYo Games has announced plans to create an additional 25 positions, over the next 18 months, in systems development, software engineering, sales and customer service. The employees will be hired to help the company keep pace with the rapid evolution of the global games market and demand for Game Maker: Studio. To accommodate this expansion, in June 2013, YoYo Games moved from its old location within Abertay University into new office space on Dundee’s Waterfront redevelopment. On 16 February 2015 it was announced that Playtech acquired YoYo Games for £10.65 million (US$16.4 million). Shortly thereafter, Duncan stepped down from his position. He was later replaced by James Cox as general manager, who himself stepped down in October 2018 to be replaced by Stuart Poole in January 2019.

Playtech sold YoYo Games to Opera for US$10 million in January 2021. Opera announced with YoYo's acquisition, it was launching a new Opera Gaming division alongside their browser software.

In February 2021, Stuart Poole left the role of General Manager and Russell Kay was named Senior Product Director (Head of GameMaker).
