= Pokémon: Magikarp Jump =

2017 video game

Magikarp Jump
- Developer: Select Button
- Publisher: The Pokémon Company
- Director: Koya Nakahata
- Producer: Kanako Murata
- Designer: Takumi Tsukada
- Programmer: Keisuke Miyagawa
- Composer: Solidtune Inc.
- Series: Pokémon
- Engine: Cocos2d
- Platforms: iOS, Android
- Release: WW: May 24, 2017
- Genre: Incremental game

Pokémon: Magikarp Jump (Japanese: はねろ！コイキング, Hepburn: Hanero! Koiking; Splash! Magikarp) is a free-to-play mobile game developed by Select Button and published by the Pokémon Company. It was released in May 2017 for iOS and Android platforms. Players train Magikarp for competition in jumping contests.

To progress in the game, players must increase their Magikarp's jump height through several methods of training, upgrading training equipment, and eating berries. In total, there are ten different core leagues plus three additional Expert leagues with varied rewards as of August 2017.

== Gameplay ==
Game screenshot of Magikarp Jump

In the game, trainers can raise their Magikarp's Jump Power (JP) to have more jumping height than other Magikarps to win special Battle Leagues. The higher the JP a Magikarp has, the higher the Magikarp can jump and win a battle.

First, trainers need to catch a Magikarp from a pond using the available fishing rod; higher quality fishing rods become available after the trainer is able to clear a league. The caught Magikarp are raised in the trainer's ponds. Trainer ponds can be equipped with Decorations to assist with the Magikarp's growth. There are also supporting Pokémon which can assist in giving rewards at certain intervals such as JP, coins, food and diamonds.

Jump Power is typically increased by one of two ways: by eating food, or running Magikarp through training sessions, which can only be done if the player has at least one training point. Training points are recovered over time, and food periodically spawns in a Magikarp's pond. Food and training equipment can be upgraded to award more Jump Power to Magikarp. Many upgrades such as these can also be upgraded with real cash, giving the player more of an advantage. While raising a Magikarp, random events are triggered that may increase or decrease awarded JP, give special occasions, or can result the loss of a Magikarp. After raising the Magikarp to its highest level (which correlates to the player's rank), the Magikarp is then pitted against other trainers in League Battles. Many Magikarp can be caught, in many colors such as red, pink, and gold. Gold is the most rare of these, and is also the most powerful in the beginning. Pink Magikarps are moderately rare, but have more of a chance to be obtained than gold Magikarps. Red Magikarps, which is the original color of Magikarp in the games and anime, are the most common. These color Magikarps can have different qualities that boost the chances of a win in League Tournaments. If a Magikarp loses a League Battle at its max level, the Magikarp is retired and trainers must catch another Magikarp and restart the current league that they were in, having to re-battle the same trainers already defeated, but with the ability to skip the battle scenes of trainers that they have already defeated. Also, this gives the player a chance to increase said JP of their next Magikarp, before participating in such leagues. The JP ranking will change depending on how many times the player can go through the leagues each time they compete.

== Reception ==
Reception

Aggregate score
| Aggregator | Score |
|---|---|
| Metacritic | 64/100 |

Review scores
| Publication | Score |
|---|---|
| Game Informer | 6/10 |
| Nintendo Life | 6/10 |
| Pocket Gamer | 3.5/5 |
| Time | 4/5 |

The game received an aggregated review score of 64 on Metacritic, indicating "mixed or average reviews". Game Informer's Kyle Hilliard gave a mixed review, calling the gameplay such as the training and league sections boring, while praising the system of new Magikarps leveling up faster than the player's previous Magikarp and enjoying the "goofiness of the silly premise" of the game. Joe Merrick of Nintendo Life was mixed, praising the game's presentation and music, calling the artwork "crisp" and calling the music great with a twist, though saying that these aspects were not special, while criticizing the lack of gameplay in the game, saying that the leagues were the element of the game which disappointed the most due to this, saying that the game lacked depth compared to other Pokémon mobile games. In the review, the game's music was compared to old role-playing video games and Yoshi's Safari.

In a more positive review, Harry Slater of Pocket Gamer, calling the game strange though compelling, praised the game's gameplay, noting the lack of control from the player but saying it was still entertaining. Polygon's Allegra Frank gave the game a large amount of praise, comparing parts of it to the series' role-playing games, praising the player's bond to their Magikarp, and saying that "Magikarp Jump is a smart, cute, endlessly entertaining game that truly gets the spirit of the handheld Pokémon role-playing games". Matt Peckham of Time gave a positive review, stating that the game was "so dumb it just might be brilliant", though complaining about the forcing the player to retire their Magikarp and raise a new one after reaching a certain level, noting that this was their only complaint.
