= IPoker =

Online poker room

iPoker
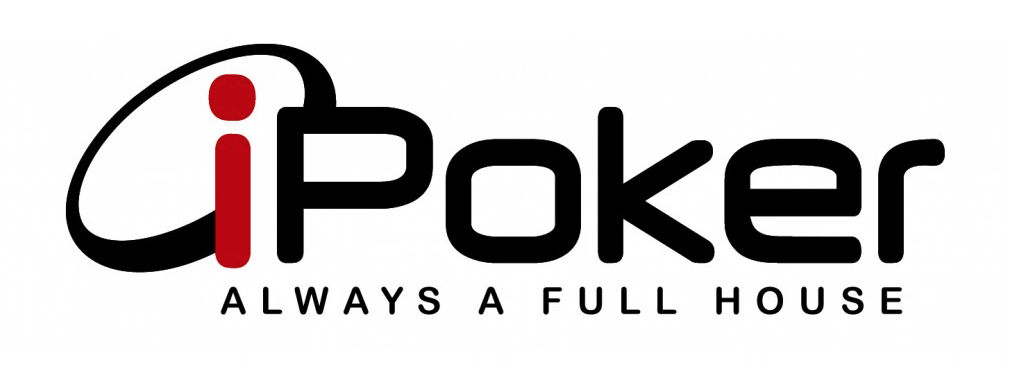
- Company type: Public
- Industry: Online poker
- Area served: Worldwide
- Owner: Playtech
- Website: www.ipoker.com

iPoker is an online poker network owned by Playtech. In 2014, it was ranked as the 10th largest online poker network in the world.

== History ==
Playtech debuted the iPoker network in September 2004. Growth accelerated after the acquisition of the Tribeca Tables Europe network in 2007, briefly placing iPoker second only to PokerStars for global traffic.

== Network ==
The B2B model lets bookmakers and casinos operate branded clients while sharing a centralised cashier, security and tournament schedule. As of 2025 the network lists around twenty active skins—including Bet365, Betfair Poker, William Hill, Betsson, Betsafe, Paddy Power, RedStar and Svenska Spel.

== Controversies and criticism ==
=== Two-tier network (2012–2015) ===
In 2012, iPoker split cash-game liquidity into two tiers, with exclusive tables available to higher-performing operators that met targets for active and newly depositing players. The policy drew criticism for fragmenting liquidity and favouring larger brands. iPoker later introduced SBR and, on August 11, 2015, merged back to a single player pool.

=== Enforcement against third-party aggregators (2013) ===
In May 2013, iPoker banned the account-aggregator Muchos Poker from referring new players to network rooms; industry reporting noted that existing players could withdraw subject to routine collusion and fraud checks.

=== “Source-Based Rake” revenue sharing (2015) ===
On February 1, 2015, the network implemented SBR to weight revenue allocation by the origin of deposited funds rather than raw rake. Coverage at the time explained the aim was to curb incentives to recruit only high-volume winning players and encourage a more recreational ecosystem; the change prompted debate among affiliates and professionals over downstream effects on rewards.

=== UK regulatory action involving iPoker-branded operators (2020) ===
In 2020, the UK Gambling Commission identified “serious systemic failings” in player-protection and AML controls at PT Entertainment Services, the Playtech B2C operator behind Winner.co.uk and Titanbet.co.uk (brands whose poker rooms operated on iPoker). PTES surrendered its UK licences. Playtech later announced a £3.5m payment to charities. The case concerned those brands’ conduct across verticals and not iPoker software operation.

== See also ==
- Playtech
- Online poker
