= Star City, Birmingham =

Entertainment complex in Nechells, Birmingham, England

Coordinates: 52°30′18.58″N 1°51′18.99″W

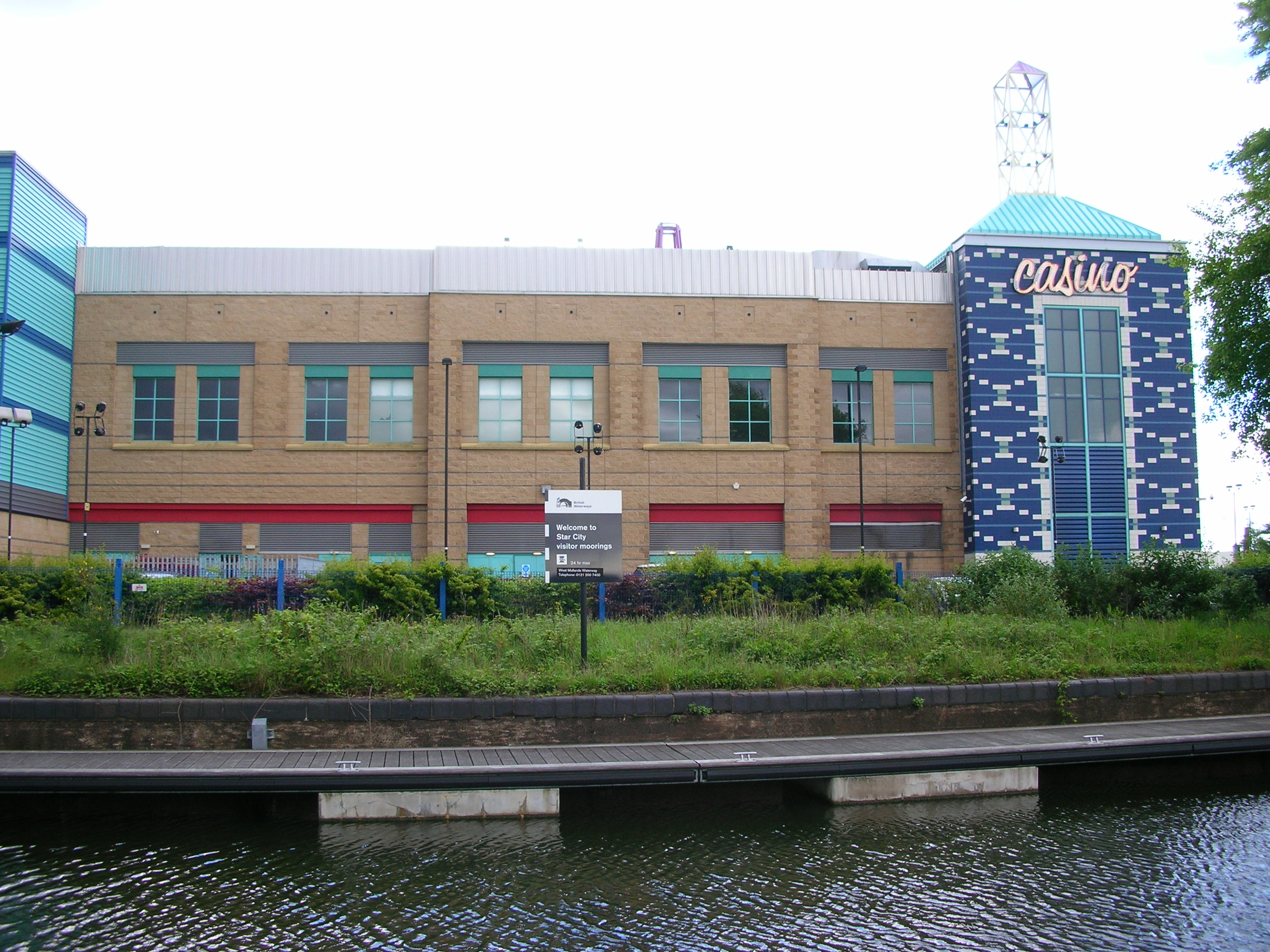
Star City has its own canal moorings

Star City is a family leisure and entertainment complex in Nechells, Birmingham, England. It is located in the north east of the city very close to Junction 6 of the M6 motorway (Spaghetti Junction), and Aston railway station.

== Development ==
This former derelict industrial land was developed as part of a regeneration scheme for the Heartlands area and to change Birmingham's image for the 21st century. Its centrepiece is the 25-screen (formerly 30-screen) Vue cinema, at the time the largest cinema in Europe and originally opened as Warner Brothers Cinema. The construction was carried out by Wolverhampton based firm Carillion. The complex was formally opened in July 2000 by actors George Clooney and Mark Wahlberg to coincide with the UK premier of The Perfect Storm. With some 392,000 square feet (36,400 m^{2}) of leisure space, it is one of the largest leisure complexes in the United Kingdom.

== Attractions ==
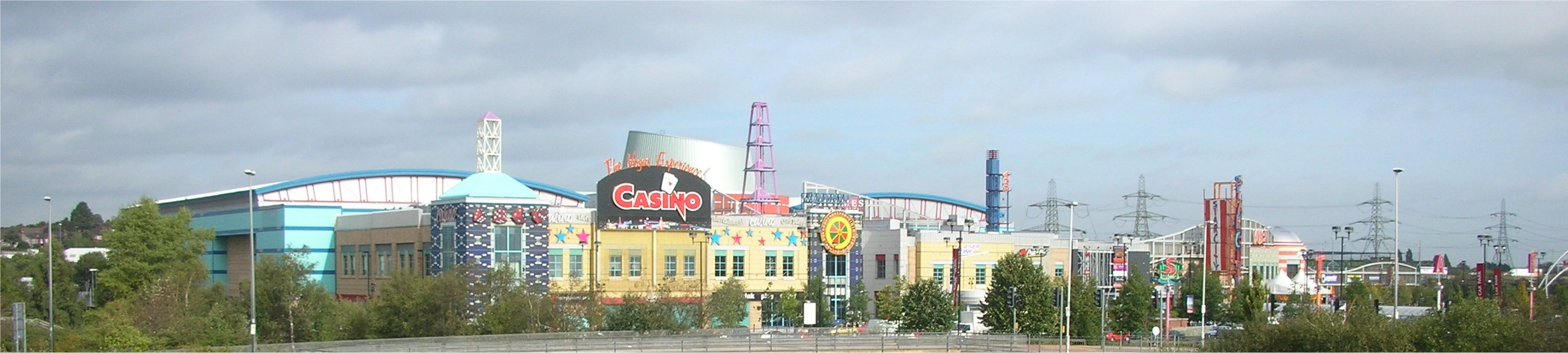
Star City, Birmingham, England.

A 22-lane Megabowl (now branded as 'Tenpin') bowling alley was revealed when Star City opened and has remained since. By the end of 2003, it was the largest leisure park in the country ahead of The Printworks in Manchester and The Mailbox in Birmingham city centre.

A Goals soccer centre opened in 2007 with fourteen floodlit pitches situated on the roof. Goals also incorporates a Sports Bar which shows year round sporting events on both Sky and Terrestrial TV.

The centre underwent a major redevelopment in 2008. England's first indoor 36 hole adventure mini golf course, 'Adventure Island Mini Golf', opened on 11 June 2008.

== Reflecting the community ==
Star City is located in Nechells where ethnic minorities make up the majority of the area's population. As a result, the screening of Bollywood films by Vue's theatre at the site is seen as an attraction for visitors. Entertainment for the venue includes a visit made by the Canadian Cirque du Soleil in 2005.

== 2019 violence ==
On 23 November 2019 at the Vue cinema, during a screening of Blue Story, which depicts gang violence, a violent disturbance broke out. Some of those involved carried machetes. Seven West Midlands Police officers were injured and a number of people were arrested. Following the incident, Vue banned all future screenings of the film from its cinemas.
