= Playtech =

Online gambling software company

Playtech plc
- Type: Public
- Traded as: LSE: PTEC; FTSE 250 component
- ISIN: IM00B7S9G985
- Industry: Software
- Founded: 1999; 27 years ago
- Founder: Teddy Sagi
- Headquarters: Douglas, Isle of Man
- Key people: Brian Mattingley, (Chairman); Mor Weizer, (CEO)
- Products: Online gaming and casinos software and associated services
- Revenue: ▼€ 763.6 million (2025)
- Operating income: ▼€ (128.6) million (2025)
- Net income: ▲€ 1,484.3 million (2025)
- Number of employees: 7,400 (2025)
- Website: www.playtech.com

Playtech plc is a gambling software development company founded in 1999. The company provides software for online casinos, online poker rooms, online bingo games, online sports betting, scratch games, mobile gaming, live dealer games and fixed-odds arcade games online. It is listed on the London Stock Exchange and is a constituent of the FTSE 250 Index.

== History ==
Playtech was founded in 1999 by the Israeli entrepreneur Teddy Sagi in Tartu, Estonia, with partners from the casino, software engineering and multimedia industries. Playtech launched its first casino product in 2001, and since then it has grown to become the world's leading and largest international designer, developer and licensor of web and mobile application software to the digital gaming industry, whose customers are most of the blue chip companies in this industry (William Hill, Ladbrokes, Bet365 in the UK, Snai and Sisal in Italy, etc.), as well as governments and regulated agencies.; In March 2006, Playtech was floated successfully on the AIM market at a valuation of approximately US$950 million (approximately £550 million).

After the passage of the Unlawful Internet Gambling Enforcement Act of 2006, the company's stock suffered a one-day fall of over 40%. On 22 October 2008, Playtech announced that it would acquire private assets from Teddy Sagi in return for $250 million. Then in March 2011, Playtech bought PT Turnkey Services from Teddy Sagi for £125m. In July 2013, Playtech acquired PokerStrategy.com, one of the largest poker communities in the world with almost 7 million members, from etruvian Holdings Ltd for $49.2 million. In September 2014, Playtech announced the acquisition of Aristocrat Lotteries from Aristocrat Leisure, in a EUR €10.5 million deal.

In January 2015, many Playtech-powered casino sites announced they were leaving the German market. In February 2015 it was announced that Playtech acquired YoYo Games, the maker of GameMaker Studio game development software, for £10.65 million (US$16.4 million). It was revealed in June 2015 that Playtech would acquire the online foreign exchange trader Plus500 for a fee of $699 million. This planned deal was terminated in November 2015.

In May 2016 Playtech acquired Swedish online game developer Quickspin. The first payment of €24m will represent 100% of the shares of Quickspin on a cash free debt free basis with the remaining €26m to be paid on an earn-out basis depending on Quickspin's EBITDA over the course of 2017 and 2018. In July 2016 Playtech acquired rival operator Best Gaming Technology (BGT) for €138m, as betting groups continue to react to the wave of consolidation that has swept through the industry. Playtech branched out into Romania in January 2017 with the opening of its casino studio based in Bucharest designed to provide live casino games to local online gambling operators. With Playtech's licensing contract with Marvel Comics expiring on 31 March 2017, the provider announced a new partnership with Warner Bros in February 2017 for the development of slots based on DC Comic feature films such as Batman v Superman: Dawn of Justice, The Dark Knight Trilogy, Suicide Squad and Justice League.

In November 2016, Playtech announced the acquisition of CFH Group, a prime of prime broker, to strengthen the B2B offering in its Financials division which it later named TradeTech Group.

In October 2017, Playtech announced that they had acquired BetBuddy, a leading responsible gambling analytics company. BetBuddy's behavioural identification and modification software will be integrated with Playtech's current player management system in the hopes it can identify and help problem gambling quicker.

In January 2018, Playtech finalised the integration of Featurespace's machine learning real-time fraud detection platform into its information management systems. The strategic partnership with the behavioural analytics company aims for Playtech's licensees to identify and reduce fraud attacks.

In March 2018, Playtech agreed a deal with Totalizator Sportowy, the provider of the Polish national lottery.

In April 2018, Playtech paid €291 million for a 70.6% stake in Italian betting and gaming firm Snaitech. Including Snaitech's debt, the enterprise value of the deal was €846 million.

In Sept 2018, Playtech announced that it was selling its 10% stake in Plus500 Ltd. for a total of £176 million.

In November 2018, founder Teddy Sagi sold his remaining shares in Playtech. Though Sagi had been steadily reducing his holdings in the company, the final sale came not long after investor Jason Ader urged the company to shed its remaining ties to Sagi, whose ongoing involvement Ader claimed might have hindered Playtech's U.S. market ambitions.

In April 2020, Playtech appointed non-executive director Claire Milne as interim chairman after former chair Alan Jackson indicated his intention to step down following the company's 2020 annual general meeting.

On May 29, 2020, Playtech agreed to pay £3.5 million to responsible gambling charities following the suicide of 25-year-old Chris Bruney, a customer at the company's TitanBet and Winner gambling sites who lost over £119,000 in the five days prior to his death, during which time he was issued multiple bonuses by managers of the sites’ VIP programs. The UK Gambling Commission had planned to impose a £3.5 million penalty on Playtech subsidiary PT Entertainment Services after identifying “serious systemic failings in the way PTES managed its social responsibility and anti-money laundering processes” but the company surrendered its UK licenses before the penalty could be imposed. Following media reports of the controversy, Playtech agreed to pay the £3.5 million and chairperson Claire Milne promised to personally apologize to Bruney's family.

In August 2020, Playtech began offering online casino games via Bet365’s New Jersey-licensed website, marking the company's debut in the US regulated online gambling market.

In August 2020 Playtech confirmed that it was exploring a potential sale of trading technology division to TradeTech.

As part of its divestment of its casual and mobile game sectors, Playtech announced it had sold YoYo Games to Opera Software in January 2021 for US$10 million.

On 11 October 2021, Playtech announced the partnership with Holland Casino for the development of their online casino environment.

On 18 October 2021, Aristocrat Leisure announced that it had made an offer to acquire Playtech for US$3.7 billion. The transaction was abandoned nine months later due to challenging market conditions.

== Operations ==
Virtue Fusion is Playtech's bingo platform. The platform, which was acquired in 2010, has been enhanced by the purchase of ECM Systems in 2016.

iPoker is Playtech's poker platform. It was implemented in the UK by casino game designer Geoff Hall, inventor of Blackjack Switch and currently has more than 60 members of staff. The network works using a skin-based system. This simply means that each site on the network has its own skin of the underlying poker interface; the lobby, table layout and design are all exactly the same. However, each site can apply its own colour scheme and branding. Most importantly in order to maintain the liquidity needed to operate a successful poker network, each of these skins shares the same player pool. As of April 2014 the network had 30 active skins.

Playtech BGT Sports, a majority-owned subsidiary of Playtech, provides sports betting software and technology to bookmakers. It was formed through the 2016 acquisition of Best Gaming Technology GmbH, which was then merged with Playtech's existing sports businesses. As of 2016, its software powers approximately 27,000 self-service betting terminals for operators such as Ladbrokes, Paddy Power, and OPAP.

In April 2022, Playtech announced a TV game content and production partnership with Entains British betting and gambling company Ladbrokes.

In April 2022, Playtech announced a content agreement with online igaming software provider CT gaming, allowing the release of the company’s content via the Playtech Open Platform.

In December 2024, Playtech transitioned its Estonian infrastructure from in‑office servers to GDC’s EN 50600-certified data centre in Tallinn. The facility is powered entirely by renewable energy (solar, wind, hydro), significantly improving energy efficiency and aligning with the company's environmental goals.

In March 2025, Playtech entered a long-term partnership with Progress Play, designating Playtech as its exclusive bingo provider. Progress Play became the first white-label network to adopt Playtech’s next-gen bingo platform (launched December 2024), benefitting from its vast B2B liquidity and hosting over 120 UK gambling sites. Playtech supported Admiral Casino UK in launching a new Virtue Fusion-powered bingo platform, in partnership with Greentube.
