= Dragon Gate (mythology) =

Dragon Gate in Chinese mythology

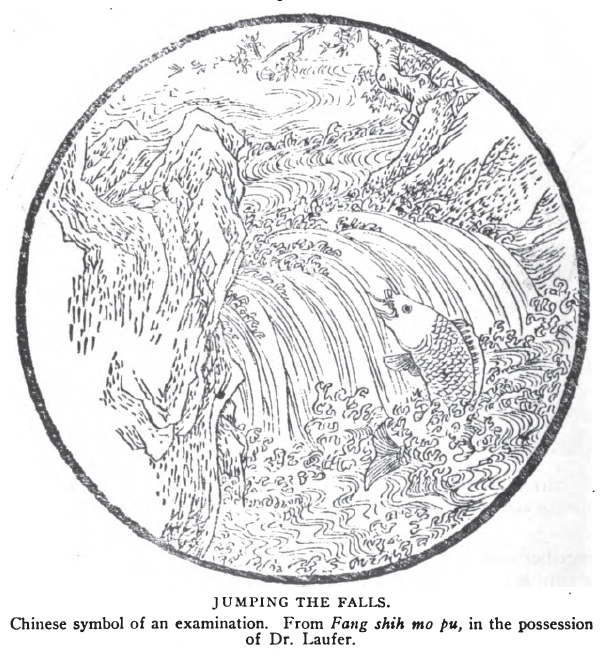
Jumping the falls print, folio from the Fang shi mo pu (方氏墨譜). It is a Chinese symbol of an examination.

In Chinese mythology, the Dragon Gate (simplified Chinese: 龙门; traditional Chinese: 龍門; pinyin: lóngmén; Jyutping: lung4 mun4) is located at the top of a waterfall cascading from a legendary mountain. The legend states that while many carp swim upstream against the river's strong current, few are capable or brave enough for the final leap over the waterfall. If a carp successfully makes the jump, it is transformed into a powerful dragon.

== Legends ==
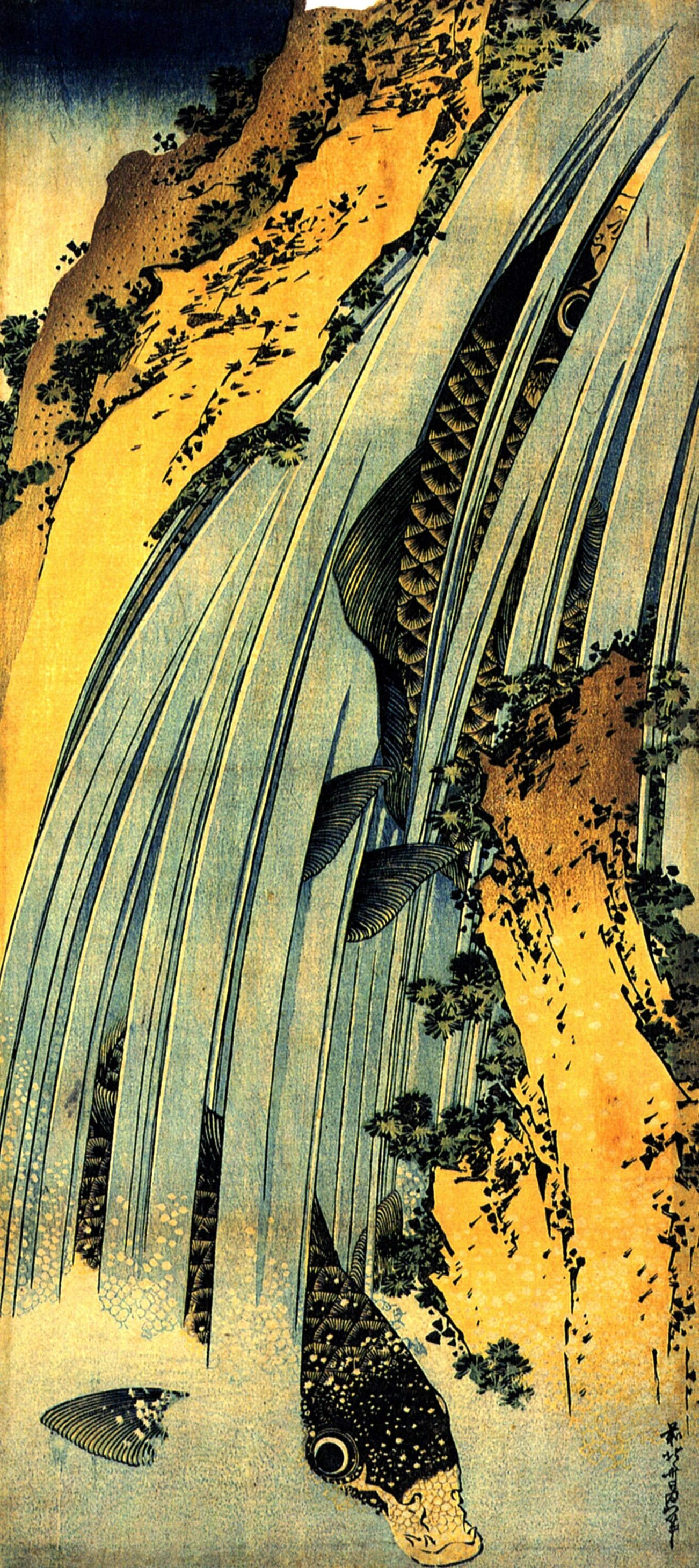
Two carps in a cascade ukiyo-e woodcut print by Katsushika Hokusai, Edo period

According to tradition, a carp that could swim upstream and then leap the falls of the Yellow River at Dragon Gate (Longmen) would be transformed into a dragon. This motif symbolizes success in the civil service examinations. The Dragon Gate is located at the border of Shanxi and Shaanxi where the Yellow River flows through a cleft in the Longmen mountains, supposedly made by Yu the Great, who cut through the mountain.

According to one account, forceful water brought many carp down the river, and the carp could not swim back. The carp complained to Yu the Great. His wife, the Jade Emperor's daughter, explained to her father on behalf of the carp. The Jade Emperor promised that if those carp could leap over the Dragon Gate, then they would become mighty dragons. Thus, all the carp competed at a yearly competition to leap the Longmen falls; those who succeeded were immediately transformed into dragons and flew off into the sky.

Pictures of carp attempting to leap the Longmen falls have been enduringly popular in China and other parts of Asia such as Japan (known as Tōryūmon). There are other Dragon Gates (Longmen) in China's rivers, typically with steep narrows, and the mythological geography does not depend upon an actual location. Many other waterfalls in China also have the name Dragon Gate and much the same is said about them. Other famous Dragon Gates are on the Wei River where it passes through the Lung Sheu Mountains and at Tsin in Shanxi Province. The "flying carp" or "silver carp" (Hypophthalmichthys molitrix) is native to China and other parts of Asia.

== Idiom ==
The myth is referenced in the proverbial idiom "a carp leaping the Dragon Gate" (simplified Chinese: 鲤鱼跳龙门; traditional Chinese: 鯉魚跳龍門; pinyin: lǐyú tiào lóngmén; Jyutping: lei5 jyu4 tiu3 lung4 mun4), meaning a sudden uplift in one's social status. This can mean ascending into upper society or obtaining the favor of royalty, perhaps through marriage, but often refers to success in the imperial examination. The idiom is commonly used to encourage students or children to achieve success through hard work and perseverance. This symbolic image, as well as the image of the carp itself, has been one of the most popular themes in Chinese paintings, especially those in popular styles. The fish is usually colored in gold or pink, shimmering with an auspicious tone.

== In popular culture ==
In the Japanese media franchise Pokémon, the two fictional Pokémon species known as Magikarp and Gyarados reference this myth. Magikarp is a weak fish monster based on the carp, which can turn into the much stronger Gyarados, based on a Chinese dragon, after exhaustive training.

== See also ==
- Koinobori
