= GameMaker =

Game creation system

- Original author: Mark Overmars
- Developer: YoYo Games
- Release: 15 November 1999; 26 years ago
- Stable release: v2026.0.0 / 21 May 2026; 5 months ago
- Written in: C++ (runtime); C# (IDE)
- Operating system: Microsoft Windows; macOS; Linux
- Platform: Microsoft Windows; macOS; Ubuntu; HTML5; Android; iOS; Amazon Fire TV; Android TV; PlayStation 4; PlayStation 5; Xbox One; Xbox Series X/S; Nintendo Switch; Nintendo Switch 2
- Available in: English; French; Spanish; German; Brazilian Portuguese; Russian; Chinese (Simplified); Polish; Italian; Korean; Japanese
- License: Proprietary
- Website: gamemaker.io

GameMaker (originally Animo, Game Maker (until 2011) and GameMaker Studio) is a series of cross-platform game engines created by Mark Overmars in 1999 and developed by YoYo Games since 2007.

As of September 2026, the current long-term stable release is GameMaker LTS 2026.0, published on 21 May 2026.

GameMaker accommodates the creation of cross-platform and multi-genre video games using a custom drag-and-drop visual programming language or a scripting language known as GameMaker Language (GML), which can be used to develop more advanced games. GameMaker was originally designed to allow novice programmers to be able to make computer games without much programming knowledge by use of these actions. Recent versions of software also focus on appealing to advanced developers.

== Overview ==
GameMaker is primarily intended for making games with 2D graphics, allowing out-of-box use of raster graphics, vector graphics (via SWF), and 2D skeletal animations (via Esoteric Software's Spine) along with a large standard library for drawing graphics and 2D primitives. While the software allows for limited use of 3D graphics, this is in the form of vertex buffer and matrix functions, and as such not intended for novice users.

The engine uses Direct3D on Windows and Xbox; OpenGL on macOS and Linux; OpenGL ES on Android and iOS; WebGL or 2D canvas on HTML5; and proprietary APIs on consoles.

The engine's primary element is an IDE with built-in editors for raster graphics, level design, scripting, paths, and shaders (GLSL or HLSL). Additional functionality can be implemented in software's scripting language or platform-specific native extensions. In GameMaker Studio 2, users can choose whether to export the game as an NSIS installer, or a .zip file containing the game, the data.win file, and any files added under the "Included Files" tab in the editor.

=== Supported platforms ===
GameMaker supports building for Microsoft Windows, macOS, Ubuntu, HTML5, Android, iOS, Amazon Fire TV, Android TV, PlayStation 4, Nintendo Switch and Xbox One; support for PlayStation 5 and Xbox Series X|S was announced in February 2021 though an "Enterprise" licence is needed to build games for these consoles.

In the past, GameMaker supported building for Windows Phone (deprecated in favour of UWP), the Universal Windows Platform, Tizen, PlayStation 3, and PlayStation Vita. UWP export was itself removed in version 2022.8; submitting to the Microsoft Store now requires building for Windows and using the GDK extension.

Between 2007 and 2011, YoYo Games maintained a custom web player plugin for GameMaker games before releasing it as open-source mid-2011 and eventually deprecating it in favour of HTML5 export.

Prior to August 2021, users had to obtain a single-purchase licence for one of five different platforms, excluding consoles, depending on the target platform they wanted to publish on (such as desktop or mobile). An annual licence was required to publish for consoles, which was also contained in an all-encompassing annual Ultimate licence that covered all supported platforms. Yoyo Games announced a change to the licensing approach in August 2021, allowing GameMaker to be used for free to learn, and eliminating the single-purchase options. Instead, it simplified the licence scheme to only two tiers, one that supported publishing on all non-console platforms, and a higher tier that added in console platform publishing support at a lower rate than the prior Ultimate licence. These changes were aided by the financial investment of Opera into YoYo Games to help reduce costs for GameMaker users. On 22 November 2023, GameMaker announced that it would be "free for non-commercial use on all platforms (excluding console)," and the current subscription system would be replaced by a one-time licence.

=== GX.games ===
In November 2021, Opera launched GXC, a browser-based platform for publishing and playing games made in GameMaker, entering open beta on 4 November with roughly 500 titles. The platform was later rebranded to GX.games, and a mobile version went into beta in July 2022, at which point the desktop platform hosted over 1,500 GameMaker titles. GameMaker still has a dedicated GX Games export target to this day. As of September 2026, the platform's paid-game purchasing system is being phased out, with the number of games offering it reducing over time. No closure of the platform itself has been announced.

== GameMaker Language ==
GameMaker Language (GML) is GameMaker's scripting language. It is an imperative, dynamically typed language commonly likened to JavaScript and C-like languages. The language's default mode of operation on native platforms is a bytecode stack machine. Alternatively, the YoYo Compiler (YYC) transpiles GML to C++, which is then compiled to native code by the target platform's own C++ toolchain, trading longer build times for higher runtime performance. On HTML5, GML is source-to-source compiled to JavaScript with optimisations and minification applied in non-debug builds.

=== GML Visual ===
GML Visual (originally called "Drag and Drop") is GameMaker's visual scripting tool. GML Visual allows developers to perform common tasks (like instantiating objects, calling functions, or working with files and data structures) without having to write a single line of code. It is largely aimed at novice users.

While historically GML Visual remained fairly limited in what can be comfortably done with it, GameMaker Studio 2 had seen an overhaul to the system, allowing more tasks to be done with GML Visual, and having it translate directly to code (with an in-IDE preview for users interested in migrating to code).

== History ==
GameMaker was originally developed by Mark Overmars. The program was first released on 15 November 1999 under the name of Animo (at the time, it was just a graphics tool with limited visual scripting capabilities). The first versions of the program were being developed in Delphi. Subsequent releases saw the name changed to Game Maker and software moving towards more general-purpose 2D game development.

Versions 5.0 and below were freeware; version 5.1 introduced an optional registration fee; version 5.3 (January 2004) introduced a number of new features for registered users, including particle systems, networking, and possibility to extend games using DLLs. Version 6.0 (October 2004) introduced limited functionality for use of 3D graphics, as well as migrating the runtime's drawing pipeline from VCL to DirectX. Growing public interest led Overmars to seek help in expanding the program, which led to partnership with YoYo Games in 2007. From this point onward, development was handled by YoYo Games while Overmars retained a position as one of the company's directors. Version 7.0 was the first to emerge under this partnership. The first macOS compatible version of the program was released in 2009, allowing games to be made for two operating systems with minimal changes.

Version 8.1 (April 2011) saw the name changed to GameMaker (lacking a space) to avoid any confusion with the 1991 software Game-Maker. September 2011 saw the initial release of "GameMaker: HTML5" - a new version of software with capability to export games for web browsers along with desktop. GameMaker: Studio entered public beta in March 2012 and enjoyed a full release in May 2012. This version also had the runtime rewritten in C++ to address performance concerns with previous versions. Initial supported platforms included Windows, Mac, HTML5, Android, and iOS. Additional platforms and features were introduced over the years following; Late 2012 there was an accident with anti-piracy measures misfiring for some legitimate users.

In February 2015, GameMaker was acquired by Playtech together with YoYo Games. Announcement reassured that GameMaker will be further improved and states plans to appeal to broader demographic, including more advanced developers. November 2016 saw the initial release of GameMaker Studio 2 beta, with full release in March 2017. This version sports a completely redesigned IDE (rewritten in C#) and a number of new editor and runtime features.

In August 2020, major update 2.3 was released, bringing a host of new features to IDE, runtime, and the scripting language. In January 2021, YoYo Games was sold to Opera Software for roughly 10 million USD. The development team of GameMaker remains the same, and has not caused any major development changes to GameMaker Studio. In August 2021, YoYo Games announced that they would be changing their licences to offer a free version of the GameMaker engine. In January 2022, YoYo Games changed GameMaker Studio 2's numbering scheme so the version corresponds to the year and the month it was released (For example, 2022.1 for January 2022). In April 2022, YoYo Games dropped the GameMaker Studio 2 name in order to match its new version numbering scheme, changing it to simply GameMaker.

Since 2022, GameMaker has been distributed in two release channels: monthly releases using year-and-month version numbers, and Long Term Stable (LTS) releases aimed at projects that need a fixed feature set with a longer support window. The first LTS release was based on version 2022.3, and LTS 2026.0 was released on 21 May 2026. That release added support for the Nintendo Switch 2, announced in April 2025,

LTS 2026.0 marked the GameMaker Studio 2 runtime as feature-complete, with feature development moving to GMRT, a rewritten runtime that was in beta at the time of release. In April 2026, YoYoGames announced GM-CLI, a commandline toolset with optional integration of Anthropic's Claude Code for natural-language queries against project structure and build configuration.

== Notable games ==
GameMaker has been used to develop a number of commercially and critically successful indie games. PC Gamer named Nidhogg, Hyper Light Drifter, Undertale and Risk of Rain among the engine's notable titles, while a 2017 retrospective additionally cited Spelunky, Nuclear Throne and Hotline Miami. Later titles made with GameMaker include Deltarune, Pizza Tower and Chicory: A Colorful Tale.

== Reception ==
In 2017, Douglas Clements of Indie Game Magazine wrote that the program simplifies and streamlines game development and is accessible to beginners while remaining capable enough to grow with a developer, though he criticised the licensing between Steam and the YoYo Games website as convoluted.

Developers interviewed by PC Gamer praised the engine's low barrier to entry, its documentation and community resources, but noted drawbacks: Nidhogg developer Mark Essen noted that GameMaker's permissiveness means projects "can get messy very quickly", and Risk of Rain developer Duncan Drummond said that experience with GameMaker does not transfer readily to other engines.

GameMaker's November 2023 pricing change was widely received as a favourable contrast to Unity's Runtime Fee controversy. Head of GameMaker Russell Kay said the team had seen "other platforms making awkward moves with their pricing and terms" and deliberately did the opposite. Inverse reported that the announcement was met with broad approval from developers.

== Use in schools ==
GameMaker was used in schools because of its drag and drop programming interface. It preceded programming environments which were developed for educational use such as Scratch and Walter Bender's Turtle Blocks. Its use in schools was preceded by Logo but Logo was text based rather than drag and drop. For teachers using GameMaker, it shared a Constructionist learning theory with Logo.
