= Heart and Soul =

Heart and Soul or Heart & Soul may refer to:

== Film, television, and radio ==
- Heart and Soul (1917 film), an American silent drama starring Theda Bara
- Heart and Soul (1948 film), an Italian film co-directed by and starring Vittorio De Sica
- Heart & Soul: The Life and Music of Frank Loesser, a 2006 American documentary film
- Heart and Soul (British TV series), or All the Small Things, a 2009 drama series
- Heart & Soul (Nigerian TV series), a 2020 medical series
- Heart & Soul (Philippine TV series), or Kambal, Karibal, a 2017–2018 drama series
- "Heart & Soul" (Roseanne), a 1996 television episode
- Heart & Soul (Sirius XM), an Urban AC music channel

== Literature ==
- Heart and Soul (Binchy novel), a 2008 novel by Maeve Binchy
- Heart and Soul (Rosenberg novel), a 1996 young adult novel by Liz Rosenberg
- Heart and Soul: The Story of America and African Americans, a 2011 picture book by Kadir Nelson
- Heart and Soul, a 2008 Magical British Empire novel by Sarah Hoyt
- Heart and Soul, a 1998 autobiography by Elvis Stojko

== Music ==
=== Albums ===
- Heart & Soul (Bad Boys Blue album), 2008
- Heart & Soul (Conway Twitty album), 1980
- Heart & Soul (Eric Church album), 2021
- Heart and Soul (Five Star album), 1994
- Heart & Soul (Joe Cocker album), 2004
- Heart & Soul (Johnny Adams album), 1969
- Heart and Soul (Joy Division album), 1997
- Heart and Soul (Kathy Troccoli album), 1984
- Heart and Soul (Kenny G album) or the title song (see below), 2010
- Heart & Soul (Ron Carter and Cedar Walton album), 1982
- Heart & Soul (Ronnie Milsap album), 1987
- Heart & Soul (Stella Parton album), 2008
- Heart and Soul (Steve Brookstein album), 2005
- Heart & Soul (Teddy Edwards album), 1962
- Heart 'n' Soul, by Tina Charles, 1977
- Heart and Soul: New Songs from Ally McBeal, a soundtrack featuring Vonda Shepard, 1999
- Heart and Soul: The Singles, by Mari Hamada, 1988
- Heart and Soul: The Very Best of T'Pau, 1993
- Heart & Soul, by Ben E. King, 2010
- Heart and Soul, by Lisa Stanley, 2018

=== Songs ===
- "Heart and Soul" (AAA song), 2010
- "Heart and Soul" (Exile song), 1981; covered by Huey Lewis and the News, 1983
- "Heart and Soul" (Frank Loesser and Hoagy Carmichael song), 1938; recorded by many artists
- "Heart and Soul" (Kenny G composition), 2010
- "Heart and Soul" (T'Pau song), 1987
- "Heart and Soul" (Twin Atlantic song), 2014
- "Heart & Soul", by Air Supply from Hearts in Motion, 1986
- "Heart + Soul", by Black Rebel Motorcycle Club from Take Them On, On Your Own, 2003
- "Heart & Soul", by Embrace, a B-side of "I Can't Come Down", 2006
- "Heart 'N Soul", by Imagination from In the Heat of the Night, 1982
- "Heart and Soul", by Jonas Brothers from the Camp Rock 2: The Final Jam film soundtrack, 2010
- "Heart and Soul" by Joy Division from Closer, 1980
- "Heart and Soul", by the Monkees from Pool It!, 1987
- "Heart and Soul", by the Narcs, 1984
- "Heart and Soul", by No Sweat, 1989
- "Heart and Soul", by Prism from Small Change, 1981
- "Heart & Soul" by Insane Clown Posse featuring Vinnie Dombroski from Yum Yum Bedlam, 2021

== See also ==
- Ein Herz und eine Seele (lit. One Heart and One Soul), a 1973 German TV series adaptation of Till Death Us Do Part (UK) and All in the Family (US)
- Heart and Souls, a 1993 American film starring Robert Downey Jr.
- "Hearts and Souls", a 1998 episode of NYPD Blue
- Pokémon HeartGold and SoulSilver, enhanced remakes of the 1999 video games Pokémon Gold and Silver
