= Children of Paradise (disambiguation) =

Children of Paradise is a 1945 French film directed by Marcel Carné.

Children of Paradise may also refer to:

- "Children of Paradise" (song), a 1980 song by Boney M
- Children of Paradise – The Greatest Hits of Boney M. – Vol. 2
- Children of Paradise (poetry collection), a 1994 collection of poetry by Liz Rosenberg
- Children of Paradise (Willie Nile album), 2018
