= Typhlosion =

Pokémon species

- Pokémon character
- First game: Pokémon Gold and Silver (1999)
- Designed by: Ken Sugimori (finalized)

In-universe information
- Species: Pokémon
- Type: Fire; Fire and Ghost (Hisuian)

Typhlosion (/taɪˈfloʊʒən/, ty-FLOH-zhən), known in Japan as Bakphoon (Japanese: バクフーン, Hepburn: Bakufūn), is a Pokémon species in Nintendo and Game Freak's Pokémon media franchise, and the final evolved form of starter Pokémon Cyndaquil. First introduced in the video games Pokémon Gold and Silver, it was designed by Ken Sugimori and is featured in Pokémon Go and the Pokémon Trading Card Game, as well as various merchandise.

Classified as a Fire-type Pokémon, it has yellow and blue fur, and is able to generate flames from its back. In Pokémon Legends: Arceus, Typhlosion receives a new regional variant called Hisuian Typhlosion, with Cyndaquil being one of three starter Pokémon in that game. In addition to its Fire typing, it also gains the Ghost typing.

The Hisuian variant of Typhlosion has generally been well received, with praise given to its design and discussion had over the gender presentation of this form. Typhlosion became the subject of discussion due to a leak of details of various Pokémon games, including one that explored lore about Typhlosion. Due to a supposed inaccurate machine translation of this document, it was believed that this folklore depicted Typhlosion manipulating and impregnating a girl, though this was disputed by people claiming that the machine translation changed details.

== Conception and development ==
Typhlosion is a species of fictional creatures called Pokémon created for the Pokémon media franchise. Developed by Game Freak and published by Nintendo, the Japanese franchise began in 1996 with the video games Pokémon Red and Green for the Game Boy, which were later released in North America as Pokémon Red and Blue in 1998. In these games and their sequels, the player assumes the role of a Trainer whose goal is to capture and use the creatures' special abilities to combat other Pokémon. Some Pokémon can transform into stronger species through a process called evolution via various means, such as exposure to specific items. Each Pokémon has one or two elemental types, which define its advantages and disadvantages when battling other Pokémon. A major goal in each game is to complete the Pokédex, a comprehensive Pokémon encyclopedia, by capturing, evolving, and trading with other Trainers to obtain individuals from all Pokémon species.

Typhlosion was first introduced in Pokémon Gold and Silver. It was visually based on a honey badger. When developing the games, around 300 individual Pokémon designs were drafted by various members of the development team, with each deciding their names and features, revising the drafts as needed. During this process the team actively tried to avoid vague design concepts, as they felt this had caused difficulty in creating completed Pokémon during Red and Blue development. As the team selected which Pokémon would be included, they were drawn and finalized by lead artist Ken Sugimori. To maintain balance however, many of the newer species did not appear in the early stages of the game. Additionally, many of the Pokémon were designed with merchandise in mind, taking into account the related Pokémon toy line and anime series. As a result, designs often had to be kept simplistic, something that caused strain for Sugimori and affected his approach to the next Pokémon franchise titles, Pokémon Ruby and Sapphire.

Typhlosion is the final form of the Cyndaquil evolutionary line, evolving from the second stage, Quilava. It is a Fire-type Pokémon featuring yellow and blue fur and flames that come from its neck. Pokémon Legends: Arceus features a new version of Typhlosion as part of regional forms called "Hisuian," while Cyndaquil and Quilava retain their normal forms. It remains a Fire-type Pokémon, but gains the secondary typing of Ghost. It greatly resembles regular Typhlosion, though its flames take on a different appearance from the standard form.

== Appearances ==
Typhlosion made its debut in the games Pokémon Gold and Silver as the evolved form of Cyndaquil. Cyndaquil is made available to the player near the beginning of the game as their starter Pokémon alongside the Grass-type Chikorita and Water-type Totodile. It appears in the same role in the later version Pokémon Crystal and remakes HeartGold and SoulSilver. It later appeared in Pokémon Legends: Arceus, with a new form of the species, named Hisuian Typhlosion, appearing. It can be transferred to Pokémon Scarlet and Violet via the app Pokémon Home and both forms of Typhlosion can be obtained in The Hidden Treasure of Area Zero (with the Hisuian form requiring any Cyndaquil or Quilava caught in the Terarium to be transferred to Legends: Arceus via HOME and evolved there), the downloadable content for Scarlet and Violet. Typhlosion appears in spinoffs of the Pokémon games, including Pokémon Go, and the physical Pokémon Trading Card Game.

== Critical reception ==
Typhlosion was covered in IGN's "Pokémon of the Day" series, with the author arguing that it had a difficult time living up to Charizard due to Charizard being among the most popular Pokémon. She believed that it was the strongest of the second generation's starter Pokémon, stating that this as well as its "explosive" personality helped elevate its popularity. IGN writer Lucas M. Thomas felt that Typhlosion succeeded at following up Charizard as a Fire-type starter Pokémon. ITMedia staff praised Typhlosion's design, particularly the flames that emit from its neck, and expressed their disappointment with it not having its flames out at all times, making it look worse.

Hisuian Typhlosion's "feminine" design was the subject of commentary by critics

Typhlosion's Hisuian form has received generally positive reception. According to Inside Games, Hisuian Typhlosion's design became popular among fans, though Screen Rant writer Austin King stated that initial impressions were mixed before people saw it with its flames on display, at which point reception became more positive. Paste writer Hana Kim called its design "fantastic," and stated that its "very calm demeanor" and "gentle and pacifist" nature was a direct contrast to Typhlosion's "stoic, angry, and explosive" personality. Game Rant writer Joseph Gobran expressed disappointment with Hisuian Typhlosion, stating that both it and its other form have abilities that are "circumstantial," with Hisuian Typhlosion's ability, Frisk, being useless in a competitive scene with the standard being both sides are able to see everything about their opponents team.

The design differences between Hisuian and the original form were the subject of discussion by critics. Inside Games writer Sawadee Otsuka felt that it had a more feminine design compared to its regular form, citing "shadow-like eyelids" and a "listless appearance" that they felt made it look seductive. They also discussed how a male Hisuian Typhlosion would be seen as a "downer guy" while a female would be seen as a "seductive mature woman." Fellow Inside Games writer Hachiwatawachi discussed Hisuian Typhlosion's appearance in Pokémon Cafe Mix, where it is seen wearing a kimono. She believed that male Typhlosion were seen as "cool, handsome men with long, sharp features" while females were perceived as "sexy older sisters." On this design, she believed it felt more "bright, cute, [and] innocent." Author Norihito Kodota analyzed Hisuian Typhlosion through a queer lens, arguing that its hunched walking style, eyeshadow, and the flames around its neck defied the ability to define Typhlosion in a way that neatly fits into male or female.

Following an information leak, Typhlosion became the subject of discussion, as well as an internet meme, due to a scrapped design document detailing the folklore of its relationship with a human. This document was machine translated into English, where it appeared that a Typhlosion kidnapped and married a human girl, presumed by some to be a child, and had a child with her. This led to Typhlosion receiving negative reactions on social media. After this document was leaked, it was reported that the machine translation was inaccurate, with claims made that the machine-translated version lacked context, particularly regarding the real-world folklore inspirations. GamesRadar+ writer Catherine Lewis stated that Typhlosion in this story may be based on the shapeshifting yōkai Mujina, and noted that, whether the translation was accurate or not, being an internal document suggested it was not canon. Polygon writer Ana Diaz felt that it was similar to one of Grimms' Fairy Tales or mythology, and added that it was often compared to Pokémon like Gardevoir and Vaporeon due to the sexual nature of the story. Vice writer Luis Prada felt that people overreacted to the leaked story, arguing that these kinds of stories are present in mythology both in and outside of Japan, as well as arguing that Pokémon has always dabbled in mythological inspiration. Daily Dot writer Lindsey Weedston agreed, adding that feelings on consent differed in the time these kinds of stories appeared than they do now.
