= Liz Rosenberg =

American poet and writer

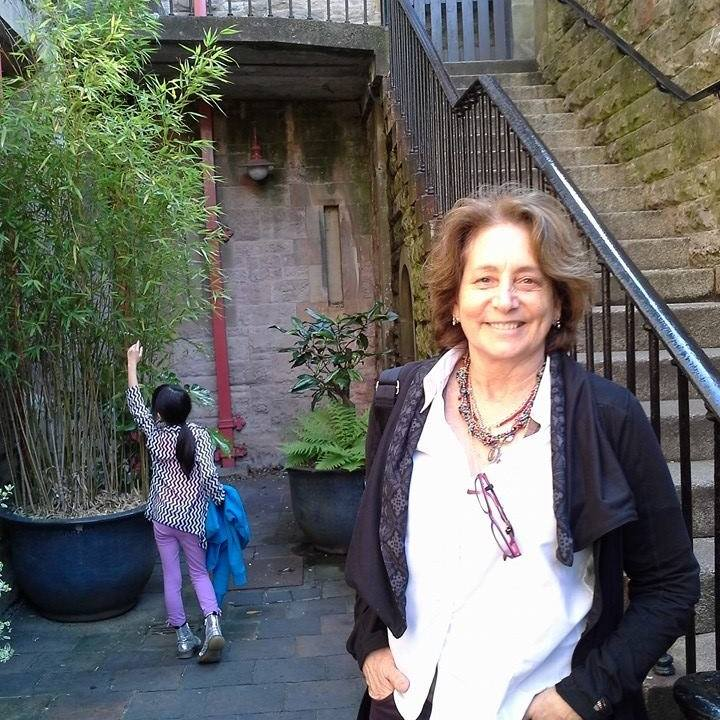
- Liz Rosenberg in 2017
- Born: February 3, 1955 (age 71); Glen Cove, New York, United States
- Education: Bennington College
- Occupations: Professor, poet, anthologist, novelist, book reviewer
- Spouse(s): John Gardner (1980-1982); David Bosnick (1983- 2014)
- Children: 2

Lizbeth Meg Rosenberg (born February 3, 1955) is an American poet, novelist, children's book author and book reviewer. She is currently a professor of English at Binghamton University, and in previous years has taught at Colgate University, Sarah Lawrence College, Hamilton College, Bennington College, and Hollins College. Her children's book reviews appear monthly in The Boston Globe.

== Life ==
=== Early life ===
Rosenberg was born on Long Island to parents Ross and Lucille Rosenberg. She grew up in Syosset, New York with her older sister, Ellen. Rosenberg wrote her first "novel" at age nine, in the fourth grade, but did not publish a novel till Heart and Soul, a Young Adult novel it took her twenty years to complete.

Her father owned a tool manufacturing company in Smithtown, Long Island, which he ran with several cousins. ROSCO Tools was sold to Vermont American in the 1980s. Her mother worked briefly in publishing, and then stayed home to care for her two children.

=== Education and teaching ===
Rosenberg graduated from Syosset High School, where she won an NCTE Writing Award in her senior year. While majoring in creative writing and literature at Bennington, her first short story, "Memory," won an Atlantic First Award and was published in The Atlantic Monthly. After writing her senior thesis on Nathaniel Hawthorne, Rosenberg graduated early from Bennington and subsequently earned her Masters in creative writing at the Johns Hopkins University Writing Program. She earned her PhD in Comparative literature at Binghamton University, where she has been teaching since 1979. Writers she has taught include Nathan Englander, Sheila Schwartz, Ellen Potter, Angie Cruz, Lisa Rowe Fraustino, Kate Schmitt, Susan Campbell Bartoletti, Jeff Ford, Josephine Schmidt, and Michael Greene.

=== Personal life ===
She met her second husband, David Bosnick, in her junior year in high school. Her first serious high school boyfriend was author Michael Pollan. They lived together for six months in Martha's Vineyard, then attended Bennington College together. At Bennington, she met her first husband, novelist John Gardner. They married in 1980 and divorced in 1982. She and Bosnick, friends since high school, married in 1983. They remained married until Bosnick's death in January 2014. They had two children.

Rosenberg has served as a board member of The Binghamton City School District, Chabad House and Beds for Kids, which provided children living in poverty with furniture and beds. She also helped found Binghamton's Indoor Playground. In the past she was in charge of Binghamton University's Local Harvest for the Homeless program, a collaborate effort between the community and Binghamton University artists.

== Works ==
=== Poetry ===
- The Angel Poems (1984)
- The Fire Music (1986)
- Children of Paradise (1994)
- These Happy Eyes (2001)
- A Book of Days (2002)
- The Lily Poems (2008)
- Demon Love (2008)

=== Poetry anthologies ===
- The Invisible Ladder (1996)
- Earth Shattering Poems (1998)
- Light Gathering Poems (2000)
- Roots and Flowers: Poets Write About Their Families (2001)
- I Just Hope It's Lethal: Poems of Sadness, Madness, and Joy (2005)

=== Novels ===
- Heart and Soul (1996)
- 17: A Novel in Prose Poems (2002)
- Home Repair (2009)
- The Laws of Gravity (2013)
- The Moonlight Palace (2014)
- Beauty and Attention: A Novel (2016)
- Indigo Hill (2018)

=== Picture books ===
- Adelaide and the Night Train (1989)
- Window, Mirror, Moon (1990)
- The Scrap Doll (1991)
- Monster Mama (1993)
- Mama Goose: A New Mother Goose (1994)
- The Carousel (1996)
- Moonbathing (1996)
- Grandmother and the Runaway Shadow (1996)
- Eli and Uncle Dawn (1997)
- A Big and Little Alphabet (1997)
- The Silence in the Mountains (1999)
- Eli's Night Light (2001)
- On Christmas Eve (2002)
- We Wanted You (2002)
- This is the Wind (2008)
- I Did it Anyway (2009)
- Nobody (2010)
- Tyrannosaurus Dad (2011)
- What James Said (2015)
- Giant Baby! (2025)

=== Biography ===
- House of Dreams: A Biography of L. M. Montgomery (2018)
- Scribbles, Sorrows and Russet Leather Boots: A Biography of Louisa May Alcott (2021)

== Editorial contributions ==
- Total Immersion, by Rifke Slonim, Contributing Editor
- Essays of Louisa May Alcott (Notting Hill Editions, England)
