= Children of Paradise (poetry collection) =

- First paperback edition (1994)
- Author: Liz Rosenberg
- Language: English
- Genre: Poetry
- Publisher: University of Pittsburgh Press
- Publication date: 1994
- ISBN: 0-8229-5502-4
- OCLC: 28926887
- Dewey Decimal: 811/.54 20
- LC Class: PS3568.O7874 C45 1993

Children of Paradise is a collection of poetry by American poet Liz Rosenberg

== Poems Included ==
Admiring Sylesh
After The Death Of A Neighbor's Child
All Those Hours Alone
In The Dark Be The One
Because I Was Dying
The Birthday Party
The Black Shoe
The Blue-flowered Bell
Charity
College Days
The Crucified
The Dalai Lama
Dark Eyes
The Dark Side
Darkness With Flashes Of Light
The Details
Ecco Homo
Fairy Tales
Fireworks
The First Child Martyr At Illinois Elementary
If Love Is Like Rain, Why Does That Tragic Woman
In The Country Of Dreamers
Intensive Care Unit
A Lesson In Anatomy
The Little Red Shoe
The Method
My Husband Takes A Photograph Of Me
New Days
The New Life
The Newborns
The Noble Corpse
Pentimento
The Plum Seed
The Poem Of My Heart
Pregnancy, First Trimester
The Recitation
The Silence Of Women
Since Only Desire Is Infinite
The Suffering
Susquehanna Country
The Terrible Ones
Third First Snow
Van Gogh's Potato Eaters
A Vanished World
The Wedding
Where Were You
Wild World
