= Heart and Soul (Rosenberg novel) =

1996 novel by Liz Rosenberg

- Author: Liz Rosenberg
- Language: English
- Genre: Novel
- Publisher: Harcourt Children's Books
- Publication date: 1996
- Media type: Print (Hardback & Paperback)
- Pages: 224
- ISBN: 0-15-201270-2
- OCLC: 32821890

Heart and Soul is a young adult novel by novelist and poet Liz Rosenberg.
