= Heart & Soul: The Life and Music of Frank Loesser =

- Directed by: Walter J. Gottlieb
- Written by: Walter J. Gottlieb
- Produced by: Walter J. Gottlieb; Final Cut Productions; James F. Cooney; Frank Loesser Enterprises
- Cinematography: Martin Andrews
- Edited by: Michael Gehman
- Music by: Jeff Gruber
- Release date: 2006
- Running time: 88 minutes
- Country: United States
- Language: English

Heart & Soul: The Life and Music of Frank Loesser is a 2006 American documentary film about Guys and Dolls composer/lyricist Frank Loesser. Directed by Walter J. Gottlieb, it is credited as the first-ever TV documentary about Loesser and was produced by Gottlieb and associate producer James F. Cooney in co-operation with Frank Loesser Enterprises and his widow, Broadway actress and singer Jo Sullivan Loesser. The documentary debuted on Public Broadcasting Service (PBS) Public television stations nationwide in 2006 and ran throughout 2007. The film details the triumphant musical career of Loesser, who rose from humble New York City beginnings as the son of German Jewish immigrant parents to become the acclaimed composer/lyricist of 5 Broadway musicals and several Hollywood movie songs which became American pop standards, such as "Heart and Soul" (with Hoagy Carmichael), "On a Slow Boat to China", and "Baby, It's Cold Outside".

Inspired by daughter Susan Loesser's biography, "A Most Remarkable Fella", the film traces the artistic arc of Loesser's career from his early days on Tin Pan Alley, to his success in Hollywood as a lyricist and (later) composer/lyricist, to his triumphs as composer/lyricist on Broadway. It also highlights Loesser as a member of that elite club of songwriters who successfully wrote both music and lyrics for Broadway, placing him in the company of Irving Berlin, Cole Porter, and (later) Stephen Sondheim. One commentator in the film calls him, "Cole Porter, without the martini in his hand," because of his ability to capture everyday American speech and emotions in music and lyrics—a songwriter whose common man's touch belied the sophistication of his music. A significant amount of screen time is spent detailing Loesser's work on Guys and Dolls, considered by many to be the best Broadway musical ever. The Guys and Dolls segment focuses on Loesser's collaboration with co-book writer Abe Burrows and his use of diverse musical forms to craft what one interviewee characterizes as the first "truly American musical."

Loesser's temperament is also explored, including a perfectionist streak, volatile temper, and colorful lexicon (according to his daughter, he never met a four-letter word he didn't like), improbably combined with a generous heart, a wicked sense of humor, and a commitment to mentoring the next generation of American songwriters. Loesser abhorred amplification in Broadway theaters and favored singers who could belt. According to the film, he even had a sign printed up during rehearsals for his operatic musical The Most Happy Fella declaiming his favorite slogan, "Loud is Good!"

The film features re-creations from Loesser's early life, home movies, archival footage, performance clips, and interviews with Jo Sullivan Loesser and three of his children: author Susan Loesser, theater owner and manager John Loesser, and actress Emily Loesser. The film also notes Frank Loesser's influence on American popular song through interviews with Broadway and Hollywood veterans James Burrows, Cy Feuer, Stephen Schwartz, Maury Yeston, Jerry Herman, Richard Adler, Samuel Goldwyn, Jr., Isabel Bigley, Charles Nelson Reilly, Robert Morse, and Matthew Broderick, among others. Frank Loesser was a chronic cigarette smoker and died from lung cancer at 59. The film garnered positive reviews in the New York Times, Wall Street Journal, Houston Chronicle, San Francisco Chronicle, Palm Beach Post, and Time.com, among others. In 2007, it won a Cine Golden Eagle Award in the non-fiction category. The film was re-broadcast on Turner Classic Movies (TCM) on June 29, 2010, the centennial of Loesser's birth.
