= Pokémon HeartGold and SoulSilver =

2009 video games

Pokémon HeartGold; Pokémon SoulSilver
- North American box art for Pokémon HeartGold and Pokémon SoulSilver, depicting the legendary Pokémon Ho-Oh and Lugia respectively
- Developer: Game Freak
- Publishers: JP: The Pokémon Company; WW: Nintendo
- Director: Shigeki Morimoto
- Producers: Junichi Masuda; Shusaku Egami; Hitoshi Yamagami; Hiroaki Tsuru
- Artist: Takao Unno
- Writers: Akihito Tomisawa; Kenji Matsushima; Toshinobu Matsumiya
- Composers: Go Ichinose; Shota Kageyama; Hitomi Sato; Junichi Masuda; Takuto Kitsuta
- Series: Pokémon
- Platform: Nintendo DS
- Release: JP: September 12, 2009; NA: March 14, 2010; AU: March 25, 2010; EU: March 26, 2010 (Note: April 2, 2010 in the Netherlands and Dutch speaking Belgium)
- Genre: Role-playing
- Modes: Single-player, multiplayer

Pokémon HeartGold Version (Note: Japanese: ポケットモンスターハートゴールド, Hepburn: Poketto Monsutā Hātogōrudo; lit. "Pocket Monsters: HeartGold") and Pokémon SoulSilver Version (Note: Japanese: ポケットモンスターソウルシルバー, Hepburn: Poketto Monsutā Sōrushirubā; lit. "Pocket Monsters: SoulSilver") are 2009 remakes of the 1999 Game Boy Color role-playing video games Pokémon Gold and Silver, also including features from Pokémon Crystal. The games are part of the fourth generation of the Pokémon video game series, developed by Game Freak and published by The Pokémon Company and Nintendo for the Nintendo DS. In commemoration of the 10th anniversary of Gold and Silver, the games were released in Japan on September 12, 2009, and were later released in other regions during March 2010.

HeartGold and SoulSilver take place in the Johto and Kanto Regions of the franchise's fictional universe, which features special creatures called Pokémon. The basic goal of the game is to become the best Pokémon Trainer in both the Johto and Kanto Regions, which is done by raising and cataloging Pokémon and defeating other trainers.

Game director Shigeki Morimoto aimed to respect the feelings of those who played the previous games, while also ensuring that it felt like a new game to those that were introduced to the series in more recent years. The games received positive reviews from critics, and as of March 2014, the games' combined sales have reached 12.72 million, making the two games combined the eighth best-selling DS video games of all time.

== Gameplay ==
The player first encounters a member of Team Rocket in Slowpoke Well. The player's Totodile, which is one of the game's three starter Pokémon, follows him.

Pokémon HeartGold and SoulSilver are role-playing video games with adventure elements. The basic mechanics of the games are largely the same as their predecessors'. As with all Pokémon games for handheld consoles, gameplay is viewed from a third-person overhead perspective, and consists of three basic screens: a field map, in which the player navigates the main character; a battle screen; and the menu, in which the player configures their party, items, or gameplay settings. The player begins the game, in classic Pokémon fashion, with one starter Pokémon and can capture more using Poké Balls.

When the player encounters a wild Pokémon or is challenged by a trainer to a battle, the screen switches to a turn-based battle screen where the Pokémon fight. During battle, the player may use a move, use an item, switch the active Pokémon, or flee. Fleeing is not an option during battles against trainers. Pokémon have hit points (HP), which is displayed during battles; when a Pokémon's HP is reduced to zero, it faints and cannot battle unless taken to a Pokémon Center or revived with a Pokémon skill or an item, typically a "revive" medicine. If the player's Pokémon defeats the opposing Pokémon (causes it to faint), it receives experience points. After accumulating enough experience points, it will level up; most Pokémon evolve into a new species of Pokémon when they reach a certain level, or when certain conditions are met. These conditions can include: how much a Pokémon statistically "likes" its trainer, the Pokémon receiving a certain item, or trading Pokémon.

=== New features ===
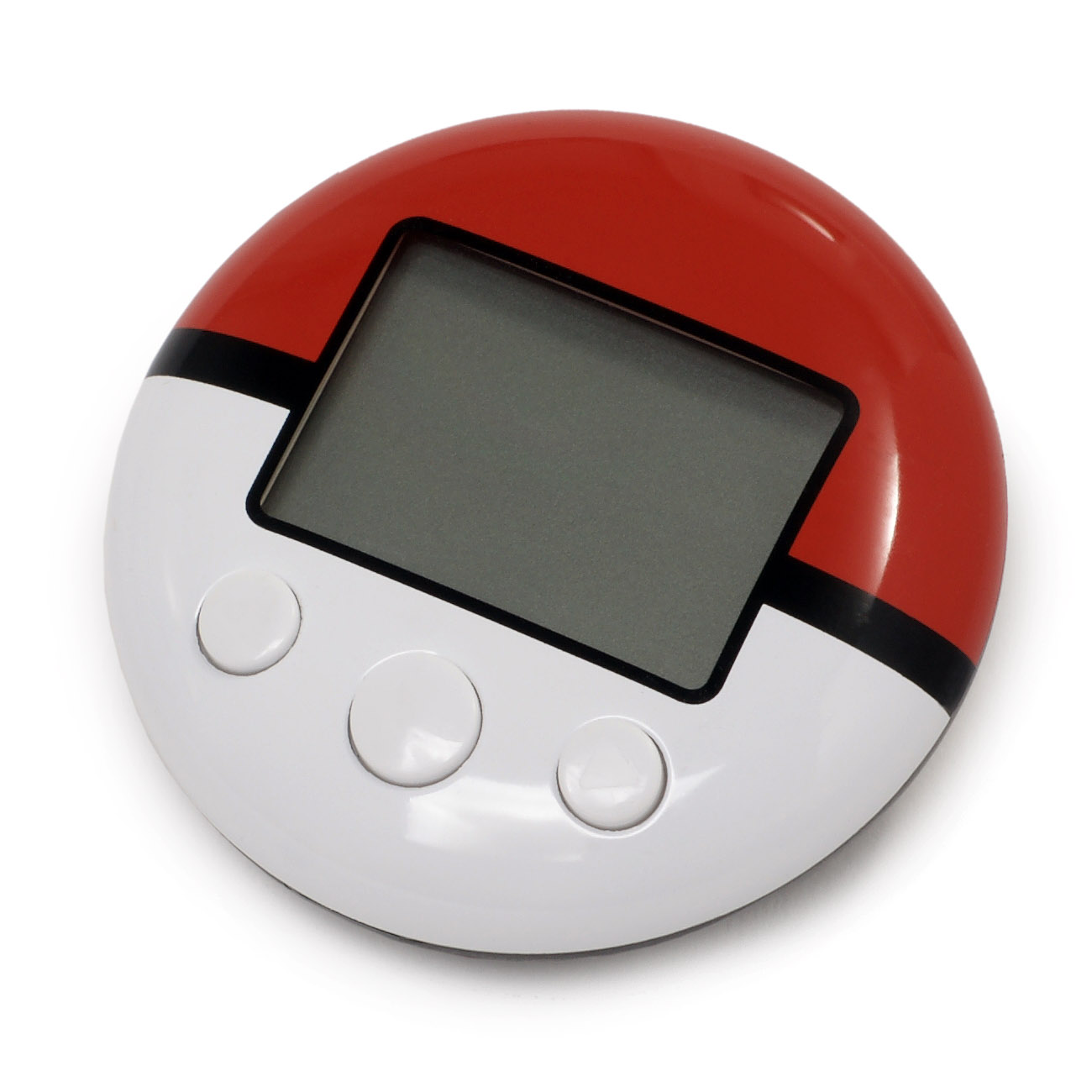
Pokéwalker

In HeartGold and SoulSilver, the Pokémon in the first slot of the player's party can follow them in the overworld, echoing a mechanic in Pokémon Yellow where Pikachu follows the player. This mechanic was also used in a limited fashion in Pokémon Diamond, Pearl, and Platinum when the player is in Amity Park with a "cute" Pokémon. The player may talk to the Pokémon to see or check on how that Pokémon is feeling, and occasionally it may pick up items. Additionally, a pedometer was bundled with each copy of the games called a "Pokéwalker", which allows players to transfer Pokémon from the game into the device and walk around with them, earning "watts" in the process, which can be exchanged for in-game rewards. In 2011, the Pokéwalker was the subject of a study conducted by Iowa State University, where it was found to be more effective than most pedometers on the market at the time.

A new minigame called the Pokéathlon (Note: Pokéthlon in Japan) uses the Nintendo DS touchscreen and allows Pokémon to compete in events such as hurdling. The Japanese versions retain slot machines found in previous games, while the international releases of the titles replace the slot machines with a new game called "Voltorb Flip", described as a cross between Minesweeper and Picross. Another new item, the GB Sounds, changes the background music to the chiptune music that sounds similar to original music from Pokémon Gold and Silver.

A new mechanic in the Safari where the player can customize areas to increase the rate of wild species to appear was also added. The entire mechanics will be unlocked after having gained the national Dex, completed two quests by the Safari administrator and automatically answered to each of his calls (one-each 3 hours of game).

HeartGold and SoulSilver were also the only games in the GB, GBA and NDS era to feature a permanent Running Shoe feature. This feature would eventually be replaced by the use of the joystick on the 3DS, which would serve to mirror this function.

=== Connectivity to other devices ===
HeartGold and SoulSilver can access the Nintendo Wi-Fi Connection (since discontinued) to trade, battle, and interact with other players of these games, as well as players of Pokémon Diamond, Pearl, and Platinum. After completing a special Wi-Fi mission download on Pokémon Ranger: Guardian Signs, the player can send a Deoxys to HeartGold and SoulSilver.

== Setting and story ==
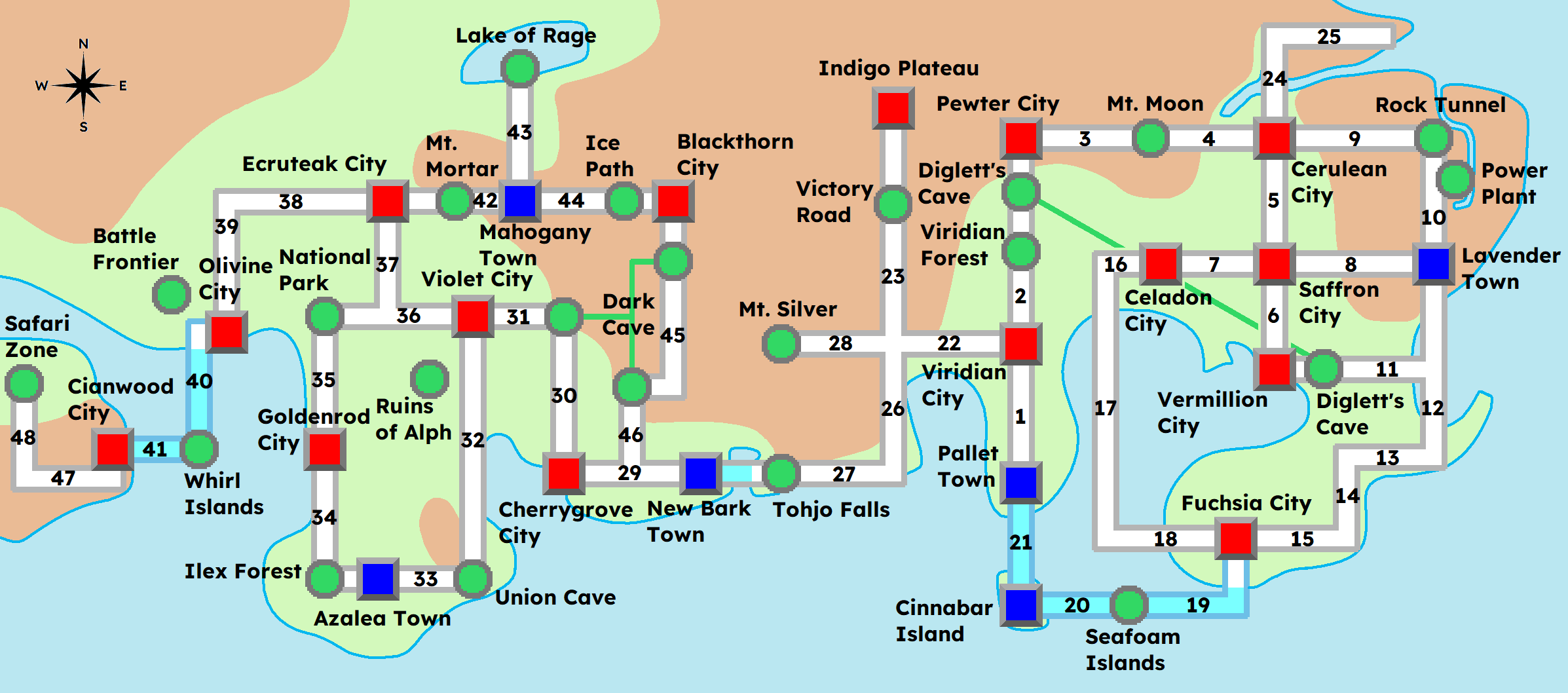
A map of Johto and Kanto

Similar to Pokémon Gold and Silver, Pokémon HeartGold and SoulSilver take place in the Johto and Kanto Regions of the franchise's fictional universe. The universe centers on the existence of creatures, called Pokémon, with special abilities. The silent protagonist is a young Pokémon Trainer who lives in a small town referred to as New Bark Town. At the beginning of the games, the player chooses either a Chikorita, Cyndaquil, or Totodile as their starter Pokémon from Professor Elm. After performing a delivery for the professor and obtaining a Pokédex from Professor Oak, he decides to let the player keep the Pokémon and starts them on a journey.

The goal of the game is to become the best Pokémon Trainer in Johto, which is done by raising Pokémon, completing a catalogue of Pokémon called a Pokédex, defeating the eight Gym Leaders in Johto for Gym Badges, challenging the best Trainers known as the Elite Four and the Johto League Champion to become the new Johto League Champion, and then subsequently defeating the eight Gym Leaders in the Kanto Region. Finally, the player may face off against the Indigo League Champion Red (the protagonist of the first generation games) atop Mt. Silver, who serves as the game's final boss.

Throughout the game, the player will battle against members of Team Rocket, a criminal organization originally from Kanto. They were originally defeated by the protagonist of Pokémon FireRed and LeafGreen (the first generation games), and have attempted to come back as an organization, while awaiting the return of their boss, Giovanni. To attempt to contact him, they take over the radio tower and broadcast a message calling out to him.

While being the remakes of Gold and Silver, the games tie in plot elements of Crystal as well, such as the added emphasis on Suicune over the other legendary beasts, as well as the post-ending Battle Frontier; in Crystal, only the Battle Tower was available. Additionally, Johto and Kanto were given Generation IV features such as the Pal Park.

During certain points in the game, the player's rival will battle the protagonist in a test of skills. Additionally, the player will encounter the Kimono Girls, who ask the player to do small favors—such as defeating a Team Rocket grunt—throughout the Johto Region. After battling all of them in a row, they proceed to the area where the player encounters the game's Legendary Pokémon mascot, Ho-Oh in HeartGold and Lugia in SoulSilver, and perform a dance to summon them. As per the originals, the other legendary Pokémon can be obtained later on.

== Development ==
HeartGold and SoulSilver were released in 2009, ten years after Gold and Silver's initial release for the Game Boy Color. Shigeki Morimoto, the games' director, commented on the development of the remakes: "The first thing that I knew I needed to bear in mind was to respect the feelings of those people who'd played Gold and Silver ten years before. I think that players have very strong memories of the game, so they'd think things like 'Ah, this trainer is still strong' and 'If I do this here, this is going to happen'. I knew I needed to respect these feelings." However, Morimoto also felt he needed to make sure that the games would feel as new games to those who began playing Pokémon in recent years on the Game Boy Advance or the Nintendo DS. An in-game author surrogate of Game Freak's President in Celadon City states that the team strove to make a game that would appeal to players with fond memories without "redoing the same thing". He also states that making the game was a "rewarding challenge". On the differences between the remakes and the originals and how the names bore out of that, Morimoto said "With HeartGold and SoulSilver, the way in which trainers and Pokémon relate has become a major theme and this has been added to the story. We came up with the titles HeartGold and SoulSilver as we decided these were appropriate to express this theme." HeartGold and SoulSilver introduced many new features that were absent in the original Gold and Silver, several of which came from the previously released Nintendo DS Pokémon games, Diamond, Pearl, and Platinum.

== Release and promotion ==
Rumors that Nintendo planned to remake Pokémon Gold and Silver started circulating in early May 2009 after the Japanese television show Pokémon Sunday ended by announcing a "world-exclusive first announcement" that would be made on its next show. Kris Pigna of 1UP.com speculated that this alluded to a possible remake of Gold and Silver for the Nintendo DS, due to gold and silver disco balls hanging in the background. Pigna further reasoned that this would be consistent with the previously released titles Pokémon FireRed and LeafGreen which were enhanced remakes of the original Pokémon Red and Blue. Several days later, Nintendo officially confirmed that Gold and Silver were being remade as HeartGold and SoulSilver and released their official logos. It was also announced that the games would contain numerous updates, although they declined to reveal any specifics. The games were released for the Nintendo DS on September 12, 2009 in Japan to coincide with the tenth anniversary of the original Gold and Silver release. Junichi Masuda stated on his blog that "we, Game Freak have spent long and firm time developing above two titles [sic]", and that "'Pokémon Gold & Silver' will be back with far more excitement."

At the 2009 Pokémon World Championships, Nintendo stated that HeartGold and SoulSilver would be released in North America between the months of January and March, Europe sometime around May and June, and Australia in April. "Announcing these much-anticipated game launches at The Pokémon World Championships allows us to give the news directly to the legions of fans who represent the true heart and soul of Pokémon," a spokesperson said. As the games approached release, from February 27 to March 13, 2010, North American video game retailer GameStop hosted a promotion in which players of Pokémon Diamond, Pearl, or Platinum could use the games' "Mystery Gift" function to download a free Jirachi Pokémon to their game. A "Pikachu-colored Pichu" could be downloaded using Wi-Fi that, when taken to the Ilex Forest in-game, unlocked a "Spiky-eared Pichu". The games were released in North America on March 14, 2010, in Australia on March 25, 2010, and in Europe on March 26, 2010 except in the Netherlands and Dutch speaking Belgium where they released on April 2, 2010.

=== Audio ===
Nintendo DS Pokémon HeartGold and SoulSilver Music Super Complete, (Note: Japanese: ニンテンドーDS ポケモン ハートゴールド&ソウルシルバー ミュージック・スーパーコンプリート, Hepburn: Nintendō DS Pokemon Hātogōrudo ando Sōrushirubā Myūjikku Sūpā Konpurīto) a three-disc soundtrack featuring music scored by Junichi Masuda, Go Ichinose, Hitomi Sato, Shota Kageyama, and Takuto Kitsuta, was released in Japan on October 28, 2009.

Disc 1
No.	Track title (Japanese)	Track title (English Translation)	Composer	Arranger
1	オープニングデモ	Opening Demo	Junichi Masuda; Go Ichinose; Morikazu Aoki	Junichi Masuda; Go Ichinose; Morikazu Aoki
2	タイトル	Title	Junichi Masuda	Shota Kageyama
3	冒険をはじめよう！	Let's Begin the Adventure!	Junichi Masuda	Go Ichinose; Shota Kageyama
4	ワカバタウン	New Bark Town	Junichi Masuda; Go Ichinose	Go Ichinose; Shota Kageyama
5	連れて行く	Taking You Along	Junichi Masuda	Hitomi Sato
6	コトネ	Lyra	Shota Kageyama	Shota Kageyama
7	ウツギけんきゅうじょ	Elm Research Laboratory	Junichi Masuda	Go Ichinose
8	たいせつなどうぐをもらった！	Key Item Received!	Junichi Masuda	Shota Kageyama
9	29ばんどうろ	Route 29	Junichi Masuda	Go Ichinose
10	戦闘！野生ポケモン (ジョウト)	Battle! Wild Pokémon (Johto)	Junichi Masuda	Go Ichinose
11	野生ポケモンに勝利！	Won Against the Wild Pokémon!	Junichi Masuda	Shota Kageyama
12	レベルアップ！	Level Up!	Junichi Masuda	Shota Kageyama
13	ヨシノシティ	Cherrygrove City	Junichi Masuda	Go Ichinose
14	連れて行く2	Bringing Along 2	Junichi Masuda	Hitomi Sato
15	ポケモンセンター	Pokémon Center	Junichi Masuda	Shota Kageyama
16	回復	Recovery	Junichi Masuda	Shota Kageyama
17	視線！男の子1	Glance! Boy 1	Go Ichinose	Go Ichinose; Shota Kageyama
18	戦闘！トレーナー (ジョウト)	Battle! Trainer (Johto)	Junichi Masuda	Go Ichinose
19	トレーナーに勝利！	Won Against the Trainer!	Junichi Masuda	Shota Kageyama
20	30ばんどうろ	Route 30	Junichi Masuda	Go Ichinose; Shota Kageyama
21	図鑑評価…だめだめ	Pokédex Assessment... No Good	Morikazu Aoki	Shota Kageyama
22	キキョウシティ	Violet City	Go Ichinose	Go Ichinose; Shota Kageyama
23	マダツボミのとう	Sprout Tower	Junichi Masuda	Go Ichinose
24	視線！坊主	Glance! Sage	Go Ichinose	Shota Kageyama
25	フレンドリィショップ	Pokémart	Go Ichinose	Shota Kageyama
26	ポケモンのタマゴをもらった！	Received a Pokémon Egg!	Morikazu Aoki	Shota Kageyama
27	まいこはん	Kimono Girl	Go Ichinose	Shota Kageyama
28	つながりのどうくつ	Union Cave	Junichi Masuda	Go Ichinose
29	どうぐをひろった！	Picked Up an Item!	Junichi Masuda	Shota Kageyama
30	アルフのいせき	Ruins of Alph	Junichi Masuda	Shota Kageyama
31	ラジオ「アンノーン」	Radio "Unown"	Junichi Masuda	Shota Kageyama
32	図鑑評価…まだまだ	Pokédex Assessment... Getting There	Morikazu Aoki	Shota Kageyama
33	ヒワダタウン	Azalea Town	Go Ichinose	Shota Kageyama
34	視線！ロケット団	Glance! Team Rocket	Go Ichinose	Go Ichinose; Shota Kageyama
35	戦闘！ロケット団	Battle! Team Rocket	Junichi Masuda	Shota Kageyama
36	34ばんどうろ	Route 34	Junichi Masuda	Shota Kageyama
37	ライバル登場！	Enter the Rival!	Junichi Masuda	Go Ichinose; Shota Kageyama
38	戦闘！ライバル	Battle! Rival	Junichi Masuda	Go Ichinose
39	進化	Evolution	Junichi Masuda	Shota Kageyama
40	進化おめでとう！	Congratulations on Evolving!	Junichi Masuda	Shota Kageyama
41	コガネシティ	Goldenrod City	Junichi Masuda	Shota Kageyama
42	ジム	Gym	Junichi Masuda	Go Ichinose; Shota Kageyama
43	戦闘！ジムリーダー (ジョウト)	Battle! Gym Leader (Johto)	Junichi Masuda	Shota Kageyama
44	ジムリーダーに勝利！	Won Against the Gym Leader!	Junichi Masuda	Shota Kageyama
45	リーグバッジをもらった！	Received a League Badge!	Junichi Masuda	Shota Kageyama
46	ラジオ「ポケモンチャンネル」	Radio "Pokémon Channel"	Junichi Masuda	Shota Kageyama
47	ラジオ「アオイのあいことば」	Radio "Buena's Password"	Morikazu Aoki	Hitomi Sato
48	わざマシンをもらった！	Received a TM!	Junichi Masuda	Shota Kageyama
49	コガネゲームコーナー	Goldenrod Game Corner	Go Ichinose	Shota Kageyama
50	スロット当たり！	A Win at Slots!	Shota Kageyama	Shota Kageyama
51	アクセサリーゲット	Got an Accessory	Hitomi Sato	Shota Kageyama
52	グローバルターミナル	Global Terminal	Hitomi Sato	Hitomi Sato
53	GTS	GTS	Go Ichinose; Hitomi Sato	Hitomi Sato
54	図鑑評価…がんばって！	Pokédex Assessment... Keep At It!	Morikazu Aoki	Shota Kageyama
55	じてんしゃ	Bicycle	Junichi Masuda	Shota Kageyama
56	視線！女の子1	Glance! Girl 1	Go Ichinose	Shota Kageyama
57	ポケギアに登録！	Registered in the Pokégear!	Morikazu Aoki	Shota Kageyama
58	しぜんこうえん	National Park	Go Ichinose	Go Ichinose
59	きのみゲット	Got a Berry	Morikazu Aoki	Shota Kageyama
60	エンジュシティ	Ecruteak City	Go Ichinose	Go Ichinose
61	かぶれんじょう	Dance Theater	Go Ichinose	Shota Kageyama
62	やけたとう	Burned Tower	Junichi Masuda	Shota Kageyama
63	ミナキ	Eusine	Morikazu Aoki	Shota Kageyama
64	ラジオ「オーキドはかせのポケモン講座」	Radio "Professor Oak's Pokémon Talk"	Junichi Masuda	Shota Kageyama
65	図鑑評価…なかなか	Pokédex Assessment... Not Bad	Morikazu Aoki	Shota Kageyama
66	38ばんどうろ	Route 38	Junichi Masuda	Hitomi Sato
67	ラジオ「ポケモンマーチ」	Radio "Pokémon March"	Junichi Masuda	Shota Kageyama
68	戦闘！ライコウ	Battle! Raikou	Junichi Masuda	Shota Kageyama
69	アサギのとうだい	Olivine Lighthouse	Junichi Masuda	Go Ichinose
70	なみのり	Surf	Go Ichinose	Go Ichinose
71	タンバシティ	Cianwood City	Go Ichinose	Hitomi Sato
72	ポケモンをあずかった！	Looked After a Pokémon!	Shota Kageyama	Shota Kageyama
73	42ばんどうろ	Route 42	Junichi Masuda	Shota Kageyama
74	かいでんぱ	High-Frequency Sound Waves	Junichi Masuda	Shota Kageyama
75	ロケットだんアジト	Team Rocket Hideout	Junichi Masuda	Shota Kageyama
76	視線！怪しい人1	Glance! Suspicious Person 1	Go Ichinose	Hitomi Sato
77	ライバル登場！2	Enter the Rival! 2	Junichi Masuda	Go Ichinose; Shota Kageyama
78	ラジオとう占拠！	Radio Tower Infiltrated!	Go Ichinose	Shota Kageyama
79	こおりのぬけみち	Ice Path	Junichi Masuda	Hitomi Sato
80	わざわすれ	Forgetting a Move	Morikazu Aoki	Shota Kageyama
81	りゅうのあな	Dragon's Den	Junichi Masuda	Shota Kageyama
82	イブキ	Clair	Morikazu Aoki	Shota Kageyama
83	戦闘！エンテイ	Battle! Entei	Junichi Masuda	Shota Kageyama
84	スズのとう	Tin Tower	Junichi Masuda	Shota Kageyama
85	縁寿の舞	Dance of Ecruteak	Shota Kageyama	Shota Kageyama
86	ホウオウ光臨！	Ho-Oh Visits!	Shota Kageyama	Shota Kageyama
87	戦闘！ホウオウ	Battle! Ho-Oh	Go Ichinose	Go Ichinose

Disc 2
No.	Track title (Japanese)	Track title (English Translation)	Composer	Arranger
1	26ばんどうろ	Route 26	Go Ichinose	Shota Kageyama
2	こうそくせん	High Speed Vessel	Go Ichinose	Takuto Kitsuta
3	クチバシティ	Vermilion City	Junichi Masuda	Takuto Kitsuta
4	戦闘！ジムリーダー (カントー)	Battle! Gym Leader (Kanto)	Junichi Masuda	Go Ichinose
5	シオンタウン	Lavender Town	Junichi Masuda; Go Ichinose	Takuto Kitsuta
6	イワヤマトンネル	Rock Tunnel	Junichi Masuda	Takuto Kitsuta
7	戦闘！野生ポケモン (カントー)	Battle! Wild Pokémon (Kanto)	Junichi Masuda	Shota Kageyama
8	図鑑評価…あといっぽ！	Pokédex Assessment... Just a Little More!	Morikazu Aoki	Shota Kageyama
9	ハナダシティ	Cerulean City	Junichi Masuda	Takuto Kitsuta
10	24ばんどうろ	Route 24	Junichi Masuda	Takuto Kitsuta
11	リニア	Magnet Train	Go Ichinose	Shota Kageyama
12	ラジオ「ポケモンこもりうた」	Radio "Pokémon Lullaby"	Junichi Masuda	Shota Kageyama
13	戦闘！スイクン	Battle! Suicune	Junichi Masuda	Shota Kageyama
14	タマムシシティ	Celadon City	Junichi Masuda	Takuto Kitsuta
15	ヒビキ	Ethan	Shota Kageyama	Shota Kageyama
16	11ばんどうろ	Route 11	Junichi Masuda	Takuto Kitsuta
17	ラジオ「ポケモンのふえ」	Radio "Poké Flute"	Junichi Masuda	Shota Kageyama
18	トキワのもり	Viridian Forest	Junichi Masuda; Go Ichinose	Takuto Kitsuta
19	視線！男の子2	Glance! Boy 2	Junichi Masuda	Shota Kageyama
20	ニビシティ	Pewter City	Junichi Masuda	Takuto Kitsuta
21	3ばんどうろ	Route 3	Junichi Masuda	Takuto Kitsuta
22	視線！怪しい人2	Glance! Suspicious Person 2	Junichi Masuda	Shota Kageyama
23	おつきみやま	Mt. Moon	Junichi Masuda	Shota Kageyama
24	1ばんどうろ	Route 1	Junichi Masuda	Takuto Kitsuta
25	マサラタウン	Pallet Town	Junichi Masuda	Takuto Kitsuta
26	オーキドはかせ	Professor Oak	Junichi Masuda	Shota Kageyama
27	図鑑評価…かんぺき！	Pokédex Assessment... Complete!	Morikazu Aoki	Shota Kageyama
28	視線！女の子2	Glance! Girl 2	Junichi Masuda	Shota Kageyama
29	戦闘！トレーナー (カントー)	Battle! Trainer (Kanto)	Junichi Masuda	Hitomi Sato
30	グレンじま	Cinnabar Island	Junichi Masuda	Hitomi Sato
31	47ばんどうろ	Route 47	Hitomi Sato	Hitomi Sato
32	サファリゾーンゲート	Safari Zone Gate	Hitomi Sato	Hitomi Sato
33	サファリゾーン	Safari Zone	Hitomi Sato	Hitomi Sato
34	ラジオ「バラエティチャンネル」	Radio "Variety Channel"	Junichi Masuda	Shota Kageyama
35	むしとりたいかい始まる！	Bug-Catching Contest Begins!	Go Ichinose	Shota Kageyama
36	むしとりたいかい	Bug-Catching Contest	Junichi Masuda	Shota Kageyama
37	むしとりたいかいで3位！	3rd Place in the Bug-Catching Contest!	Morikazu Aoki	Shota Kageyama
38	むしとりたいかいで2位！	2nd Place in the Bug-Catching Contest!	Morikazu Aoki	Shota Kageyama
39	むしとりたいかいで優勝！	Winner of the Bug-Catching Contest!	Morikazu Aoki	Shota Kageyama
40	ポケスロン・会場	Pokéathlon: Assembly Hall	Shota Kageyama	Shota Kageyama
41	ポケスロン・ジャージに着替えた！	Pokéathlon: Changed into the Jersey!	Shota Kageyama	Shota Kageyama
42	ポケスロン・開会式	Pokéathlon: Opening Ceremony	Shota Kageyama	Shota Kageyama
43	ポケスロン・競技開始！	Pokéathlon: Match Begins!	Shota Kageyama	Shota Kageyama
44	ポケスロン・競技中！	Pokéathlon: Match!	Shota Kageyama	Shota Kageyama
45	ポケスロン・現在1位！	Pokéathlon: Currently 1st Place!	Shota Kageyama	Shota Kageyama
46	ポケスロン・決勝戦！	Pokéathlon: Finals!	Shota Kageyama	Shota Kageyama
47	ポケスロン・結果発表	Pokéathlon: Announcement of Results	Shota Kageyama	Shota Kageyama
48	ポケスロン・表彰式	Pokéathlon: Awards Ceremony	Shota Kageyama	Shota Kageyama
49	ポケスロンで優勝！	Win the Pokéathlon!	Shota Kageyama	Shota Kageyama
50	ふしぎなおくりもの	Mystery Gift	Hitomi Sato	Hitomi Sato
51	バトルタワーうけつけ	Battle Tower Reception Desk	Morikazu Aoki	Shota Kageyama
52	バトルタワー (ジョウト)	Battle Tower	Morikazu Aoki	Shota Kageyama
53	バトルポイントをもらった！	Received Battle Points!	Satoshi Nohara	Shota Kageyama
54	バトルファクトリー	Battle Factory	Hitomi Sato	Hitomi Sato
55	バトルステージ	Battle Hall	Hitomi Sato	Hitomi Sato
56	バトルルーレット	Battle Arcade	Hitomi Sato	Hitomi Sato
57	バトルルーレットでBPをもらった！	Received BP at the Battle Arcade!	Satoshi Nohara	Shota Kageyama
58	バトルキャッスル	Battle Castle	Hitomi Sato	Hitomi Sato
59	キャッスルポイントをもらった！	Received Castle Points!	Satoshi Nohara	Shota Kageyama
60	戦闘！フロンティアブレーン	Battle! Frontier Brain	Go Ichinose; Hitomi Sato	Hitomi Sato
61	フロンティアブレーンに勝利！	Won Against the Frontier Brain!	Hitomi Sato	Hitomi Sato
62	ラジオ「トレーナーチャンネル」	Radio "Trainer Channel"	Junichi Masuda	Shota Kageyama
63	ぐるぐるこうかん	Spin Trade	Hitomi Sato	Hitomi Sato
64	Wi-Fi通信	Wi-Fi Communication	Go Ichinose	Hitomi Sato
65	Wi-Fiひろば	Wi-Fi Plaza	Hitomi Sato	Hitomi Sato
66	Wi-Fiひろば・ひろばゲーム	Wi-Fi Plaza: Plaza Game	Hitomi Sato	Hitomi Sato
67	どんどんソーナンスをクリア！	Cleared Wobbuffet Pop!	Satoshi Nohara	Shota Kageyama
68	Wi-Fiひろば・パレード	Wi-Fi Plaza: Parade	Hitomi Sato	Hitomi Sato
69	ラジオ「101ばんどうろ」	Radio "Route 101"	Morikazu Aoki	Shota Kageyama
70	ラジオ「201ばんどうろ」	Radio "Route 201"	Hitomi Sato	Hitomi Sato
71	ポケウォーカー	Pokéwalker	Junichi Masuda; Shota Kageyama	Shota Kageyama
72	ギザみみピチュー登場！	Enter Spiky-eared Pichu!	Shota Kageyama	Shota Kageyama
73	視線！まいこはん	Glance! Kimono Girl	Go Ichinose	Shota Kageyama
74	ルギア出現！	Lugia Arrives!	Shota Kageyama	Shota Kageyama
75	戦闘！ルギア	Battle! Lugia	Go Ichinose	Go Ichinose
76	チャンピオンロード	Victory Road	Junichi Masuda	Shota Kageyama
77	ポケモンリーグ	Pokémon League	Junichi Masuda	Hitomi Sato
78	戦闘！チャンピオン	Battle! Champion	Junichi Masuda	Shota Kageyama
79	殿堂入り	Entering the Hall of Fame	Junichi Masuda	Shota Kageyama
80	エンディング	Ending	Go Ichinose	Hitomi Sato
81	THE END	THE END	Go Ichinose	Hitomi Sato
82	戦闘！超古代ポケモン	Battle! Super-Ancient Pokémon	Junichi Masuda	Shota Kageyama
83	シント遺跡	Shinto Ruins	Go Ichinose	Go Ichinose
84	アルセウス	Arceus	Junichi Masuda	Junichi Masuda

Disc 3
No.	Track title (Japanese)	Track title (English Translation)	Composer	Arranger	Remark
1	オープニング	Opening			
	～オープニングデモ	~Opening Demo	Junichi Masuda; Go Ichinose	Junichi Masuda; Go Ichinose	
	～オープニングデモ2	~Opening Demo 2	Junichi Masuda	Junichi Masuda	
2	タイトル	Title	Junichi Masuda	Junichi Masuda	
3	ワカバタウン	New Bark Town	Junichi Masuda; Go Ichinose	Junichi Masuda; Go Ichinose	
4	連れて行く	Bringing Along	Junichi Masuda	Junichi Masuda; Go Ichinose	
5	ウツギけんきゅうじょ	Elm Research Laboratory	Junichi Masuda	Junichi Masuda	
6	29ばんどうろ	Route 29	Junichi Masuda	Junichi Masuda	
7	戦闘！野生ポケモン (ジョウト)	Battle! Wild Pokémon (Johto)	Junichi Masuda	Junichi Masuda	
8	野生ポケモンに勝利！	Won Against the Wild Pokémon!	Junichi Masuda	Morikazu Aoki	
9	ヨシノシティ	Cherrygrove City	Junichi Masuda	Junichi Masuda	
10	連れて行く2	Bringing Along 2	Junichi Masuda	Go Ichinose	
11	ポケモンセンター	Pokémon Center	Junichi Masuda	Junichi Masuda	
12	視線！男の子1	Glance! Boy 1	Go Ichinose	Go Ichinose	
13	戦闘！トレーナー (ジョウト)	Battle! Trainer (Johto)	Junichi Masuda	Junichi Masuda	
14	トレーナーに勝利！	Won Against the Trainer!	Junichi Masuda	Morikazu Aoki	
15	30ばんどうろ	Route 30	Junichi Masuda	Junichi Masuda	
16	キキョウシティ	Violet City	Go Ichinose	Go Ichinose	
17	マダツボミのとう	Sprout Tower	Junichi Masuda	Junichi Masuda	
18	視線！坊主	Glance! Sage	Go Ichinose	Go Ichinose	
19	フレンドリィショップ	Pokémart	Go Ichinose	Takuto Kitsuta	Not G/S/C
20	つながりのどうくつ	Union Cave	Junichi Masuda	Junichi Masuda	
21	アルフのいせき	Ruins of Alph	Junichi Masuda	Junichi Masuda	
22	ヒワダタウン	Azalea Town	Go Ichinose	Go Ichinose	
23	視線！ロケット団	Glance! Team Rocket	Go Ichinose	Go Ichinose	
24	戦闘！ロケット団	Battle! Team Rocket	Junichi Masuda	Junichi Masuda	
25	34ばんどうろ	Route 34	Junichi Masuda	Junichi Masuda	
26	ライバル登場！	Enter the Rival!	Junichi Masuda	Junichi Masuda	
27	戦闘！ライバル	Battle! Rival	Junichi Masuda	Junichi Masuda	
28	進化	Evolution	Junichi Masuda	Junichi Masuda	
29	コガネシティ	Goldenrod City	Junichi Masuda	Go Ichinose	
30	ジム	Gym	Junichi Masuda	Go Ichinose	
31	戦闘！ジムリーダー (ジョウト)	Battle! Gym Leader (Johto)	Junichi Masuda	Junichi Masuda	
32	ジムリーダーに勝利！	Won Against the Gym Leader!	Junichi Masuda	Morikazu Aoki	
33	コガネゲームコーナー	Goldenrod Game Corner	Go Ichinose	Go Ichinose	
34	グローバルターミナル	Global Terminal	Hitomi Sato	Hitomi Sato	
35	じてんしゃ	Bicycle	Junichi Masuda	Junichi Masuda	
36	視線！女の子1	Glance! Girl 1	Go Ichinose	Go Ichinose	
37	しぜんこうえん	National Park	Go Ichinose	Go Ichinose	
38	むしとりたいかい始まる！	Bug-Catching Contest Begins!	Go Ichinose	Go Ichinose	
39	むしとりたいかい	Bug-Catching Contest	Junichi Masuda	Go Ichinose	
40	エンジュシティ	Ecruteak City	Go Ichinose	Go Ichinose	
41	かぶれんじょう	Dance Theater	Go Ichinose	Go Ichinose	
42	視線！まいこはん	Glance! Kimono Girl	Go Ichinose	Go Ichinose	
43	やけたとう	Burned Tower	Junichi Masuda	Junichi Masuda	
44	ミナキ	Eusine	Morikazu Aoki	Morikazu Aoki	
45	視線！怪しい人1	Glance! Suspicious Person 1	Go Ichinose	Go Ichinose	
46	38ばんどうろ	Route 38	Junichi Masuda	Junichi Masuda	
47	アサギのとうだい	Olivine Lighthouse	Junichi Masuda	Junichi Masuda	
48	なみのり	Surf	Go Ichinose	Go Ichinose	
49	42ばんどうろ	Route 42	Junichi Masuda	Junichi Masuda	
50	ロケットだんアジト	Team Rocket Hideout	Junichi Masuda	Junichi Masuda	
51	ライバル登場！2	Enter the Rival! 2	Junichi Masuda	Junichi Masuda	
52	ラジオとう占拠！	Radio Tower Infiltrated!	Go Ichinose	Go Ichinose	
53	スズのとう	Tin Tower	Junichi Masuda	Junichi Masuda	
54	戦闘！スイクン	Battle! Suicune	Junichi Masuda	Junichi Masuda	
55	こおりのぬけみち	Ice Path	Junichi Masuda	Junichi Masuda	
56	りゅうのあな	Dragon's Den	Junichi Masuda	Junichi Masuda	
57	イブキ	Clair	Morikazu Aoki	Morikazu Aoki	
58	26ばんどうろ	Route 26	Go Ichinose	Go Ichinose	
59	こうそくせん	High-Speed Ferry	Go Ichinose	Go Ichinose	
60	クチバシティ	Vermilion City	Junichi Masuda	Go Ichinose	
61	戦闘！ジムリーダー (カントー)	Battle! Gym Leader (Kanto)	Junichi Masuda	Junichi Masuda	
62	シオンタウン	Lavender Town	Junichi Masuda; Go Ichinose	Go Ichinose	
63	イワヤマトンネル	Rock Tunnel	Junichi Masuda	Morikazu Aoki	
64	戦闘！野生ポケモン (カントー)	Battle! Wild Pokémon (Kanto)	Junichi Masuda	Go Ichinose	
65	ハナダシティ	Cerulean City	Junichi Masuda	Takuto Kitsuta	Not G/S/C
66	24ばんどうろ	Route 24	Junichi Masuda	Takuto Kitsuta	Not G/S/C
67	リニア	Magnet Train	Go Ichinose	Go Ichinose	
68	タマムシシティ	Celadon City	Junichi Masuda	Morikazu Aoki	
69	11ばんどうろ	Route 11	Junichi Masuda	Morikazu Aoki	
70	トキワのもり	Viridian Forest	Junichi Masuda; Go Ichinose	Go Ichinose	
71	視線！男の子2	Glance! Boy 2	Junichi Masuda	Morikazu Aoki	
72	ニビシティ	Pewter City	Junichi Masuda	Go Ichinose	
73	3ばんどうろ	Route 3	Junichi Masuda	Go Ichinose	
74	視線！怪しい人2	Glance! Suspicious Person 2	Junichi Masuda	Morikazu Aoki	
75	おつきみやま	Mt. Moon	Junichi Masuda	Morikazu Aoki	
76	1ばんどうろ	Route 1	Junichi Masuda	Go Ichinose	
77	マサラタウン	Pallet Town	Junichi Masuda	Morikazu Aoki	
78	オーキドはかせ	Professor Oak	Junichi Masuda	Morikazu Aoki	
79	視線！女の子2	Glance! Girl 2	Junichi Masuda	Morikazu Aoki	
80	戦闘！トレーナー (カントー)	Battle! Trainer (Kanto)	Junichi Masuda	Go Ichinose	
81	グレンじま	Cinnabar Island	Junichi Masuda	Hitomi Sato	Not G/S/C
82	47ばんどうろ	Route 47	Hitomi Sato	Takuto Kitsuta	Not G/S/C
83	サファリゾーンゲート	Safari Zone Gate	Hitomi Sato	Takuto Kitsuta	Not G/S/C
84	サファリゾーン	Safari Zone	Hitomi Sato	Takuto Kitsuta	Not G/S/C
85	ポケモンチャンネルメドレー！	Pokémon Channel Medley!			
	～ラジオ「ポケモンチャンネル」	~Radio "Pokémon Channel"	Junichi Masuda	Go Ichinose	
	～ラジオ「アオイのあいことば」	~Radio "Buena's Password"	Morikazu Aoki	Morikazu Aoki	
	～ラジオ「アンノーン」	~Radio "Unown"	Junichi Masuda	Junichi Masuda	
	～ラジオ「ポケモンマーチ」	~Radio "Pokémon March"	Junichi Masuda	Junichi Masuda	
	～ラジオ「ポケモンこもりうた」	~Radio "Pokémon Lullaby"	Junichi Masuda	Junichi Masuda	
	～ラジオ「ポケモンのふえ」	~Radio "Poké Flute"	Junichi Masuda	Junichi Masuda	
	～ラジオ「オーキドはかせのポケモン講座」	~Radio "Professor Oak's Pokémon Talk"	Junichi Masuda	Go Ichinose	
86	ポケスロン・会場	Pokéathlon: Assembly Hall	Shota Kageyama	Shota Kageyama	Not G/S/C
87	ポケスロン・開会式	Pokéathlon: Opening Ceremony	Shota Kageyama	Shota Kageyama; Takuto Kitsuta	Not G/S/C
88	ポケスロン・競技開始！	Pokéathlon: Match Begins!	Shota Kageyama	Shota Kageyama	Not G/S/C
89	ポケスロン・競技中！	Pokéathlon: Match!	Shota Kageyama	Takuto Kitsuta	Not G/S/C
90	ポケスロン・決勝戦！	Pokéathlon: Finals!	Shota Kageyama	Takuto Kitsuta	Not G/S/C
91	ポケスロン・結果発表	Pokéathlon: Announcement of Results	Shota Kageyama	Shota Kageyama	Not G/S/C
92	ポケスロン・表彰式	Pokéathlon: Awards Ceremony	Shota Kageyama	Takuto Kitsuta	Not G/S/C
93	バトルタワーうけつけ	Battle Tower Reception Desk	Morikazu Aoki	Morikazu Aoki	
94	バトルタワー (ジョウト)	Battle Tower	Morikazu Aoki	Morikazu Aoki	
95	チャンピオンロード	Victory Road	Junichi Masuda	Junichi Masuda	
96	ポケモンリーグ	Pokémon League	Junichi Masuda	Junichi Masuda	
97	戦闘！チャンピオン	Battle! Champion	Junichi Masuda	Junichi Masuda	
98	殿堂入り	Entering the Hall of Fame	Junichi Masuda	Junichi Masuda	
99	エンディング	Ending			
	～エンディング	~Ending	Go Ichinose	Go Ichinose	
	～THE END	~THE END	Go Ichinose	Go Ichinose	

== Reception ==
=== Pre-release ===
In response to the news confirming the development of HeartGold and SoulSilver, fans posted their reactions and commentary on the Internet. In particular, IGN editor Jack DeVries reasoned that the primary reason for the updated games was to be compatible with Pokémon Diamond and Pearl, allowing players to collect old Pokémon species that were previously unobtainable in the new games. He also expressed skepticism that the new titles could match the quality of the originals; stating, "For me, Gold and Silver were amazing because they introduced so many new features that have since become standards for the series. It was the first, and only, time the Pokémon games have made such a significant expansion. These days we're lucky if we get a new feature that invisibly changes the strategic elements of the game." He reminisced over the qualities that made Gold and Silver truly unique, including the full color support, internal clock, Pokémon breeding, and PokéGear. Several months later, after DeVries had played through some of the game, he wrote, "so far I like what I see, even if it all feels very familiar and formulaic at this point."

=== Critical response ===
Reception

Aggregate scores
Aggregator	Score
GameRankings	87.83% (based on 40 reviews)
Metacritic	87/100 (based on 59 reviews)

Review scores
Publication	Score
1Up.com	A−
Eurogamer	9/10
Famitsu	37/40
Game Informer	8.5/10
GamePro	4.5/5 (HeartGold)
GameSpot	8.0/10 (HeartGold)
GameZone	9/10 (HeartGold)
IGN	8.5/10 (HeartGold)
Nintendo Power	9.5/10
Official Nintendo Magazine	94%
VideoGamer.com	9/10 (HeartGold)

The games' reception has been positive, holding an aggregate score of 87 on Metacritic. The titles are among the top 20 rated DS games on the site. Japanese gaming magazine Famitsu awarded the games a composite score of 37 out of 40 based on four individual reviews, of which the ratings were 9, 10, 9, and 9. The reviewers praised the games for retaining much of the quality that drew them to the original Gold and Silver. The only drawback mentioned was that the games brought "no major surprises". Nintendo Power gave the games one of the highest scores, remarking on its replay value though criticizing shortly about no improvement in graphic animation for Pokémon sprites. Official Nintendo Magazine stated that they were the best Pokémon games yet. Game Informer's Annette Gonzalez stated "Even though the classic Pokémon formula still works as evidenced by HeartGold. I can’t help but hope for a new Pokémon title that breaks some new ground."

IGN's Craig Harris said that the titles were "like a gap filler to make the wait for a new Pokémon game just a little more bearable". James Stephanie Sterling of Destructoid stated, "While it is, at its core, the same game that you've played many years ago, it still manages to feel new and the updated features bolster the original experience in a manner that never intrudes and only enhances". 1UP.com's Justin Haywald stated that "HeartGold and SoulSilver is easily the best Pokémon game yet". VideoGamer.com reviewer Jamin Smith said, "With HeartGold and SoulSilver the Pokémon series has reached a point where it can't get any better." Eurogamer's Keza MacDonald gave the games a 9/10, stating "They combine everything that was best about the older Pokémon games", citing the Pokémon designs and improved graphics and battle system. GamePro's McKinley Noble stated that "it's clear that this is a perfect experience for both old-school trainers and the newest generation of Pokémon fans." GameZone's Cliff Bakehorn III said, "There is not a doubt in my mind: Pokémon HeartGold and SoulSilver are the pinnacle of the entire series." Nathan Meunier of GameSpot gave the games one of the lower scores, criticizing them for a lack of innovation. GamesRadar attributed the game's success to being a remake of classic games.

HeartGold and SoulSilver won the Golden Joystick Award for Portable Game of the Year in 2010, the first Golden Joystick Award win for the series.

=== Sales ===
In Japan, the games sold over 1.48 million units within the first two days of release, topping the Japanese sales chart that week. Within two weeks, the games had sold a combined total of over 2.00 million units. By December 18, 2009, the games' Japanese sales totals had surpassed 3.22 million. In Australia, over 50,000 units were sold in one week. In the United States, the games managed collective sales of 1.73 million in their first month, with the SoulSilver version selling 1.01 million and HeartGold selling 0.76 million units. The combined sales of the two games made them the highest-selling games of March 2010. By May 6, 2010, the games had sold 8.40 million units worldwide, and the games reached 10 million sales worldwide by the end of July 2010. As of September 2017, the games' combined sales have reached 12.72 million.
