= Fuecoco =

Pokémon species

- Pokémon character
- Fuecoco artwork by Ken Sugimori
- First game: Pokémon Scarlet and Violet (2022)
- Designed by: Mana Ibe; Mari Shimazaki; James Turner
- Voiced by: EN: Zeno Robinson; JA: Daiki Yamashita

In-universe information
- Species: Pokémon
- Type: Fire

Fuecoco (/fweɪˈkoʊkoʊ/), known in Japan as Hogator (Japanese: ホゲータ, Hepburn: Hogēta), is a Pokémon species in Nintendo and Game Freak's Pokémon media franchise, and one of the first three Pokémon players may choose at the beginning of Pokémon Scarlet and Violet. Since its initial appearance, Fuecoco has appeared in multiple games in the series, including Pokémon Go and the Pokémon Trading Card Game, as well as various merchandise.

Classified as a Fire-type Pokémon, Fuecoco is the first stage of an evolutionary line, eventually becoming Crocalor and later Skeledirge, gaining the secondary typing of Ghost in its final form. It is one of the three Pokémon available at the start of Scarlet and Violet, alongside Sprigatito and Quaxly. Fuecoco has been met positively, primarily for its cute and appealing design.

== Conception and development ==
Fuecoco is a species of fictional creatures called Pokémon created for the Pokémon media franchise. Developed by Game Freak and published by Nintendo, the Japanese franchise began in 1996 with the video games Pokémon Red and Green for the Game Boy, which were later released in North America as Pokémon Red and Blue in 1998. In these games and their sequels, the player assumes the role of a Trainer whose goal is to capture and use the creatures' special abilities to combat other Pokémon. Some Pokémon can transform into stronger species through a process called evolution via various means, such as exposure to specific items. Each Pokémon has one or two elemental types, which define its advantages and disadvantages when battling other Pokémon. A major goal in each game is to complete the Pokédex, a comprehensive Pokémon encyclopedia, by capturing, evolving, and trading with other Trainers to obtain individuals from all Pokémon species.

Fuecoco is a small red crocodilian Pokémon. It is one of the three Pokémon players can obtain as their first in Pokémon Scarlet and Violet, and it can evolve into Crocalor (アチゲータ, Achigēta; Achigator) and Skeledirge (ラウドボーン, Raudobōn; Laudbon) after gaining enough experience. It and its evolutions all have the elemental attribute of Fire-type, which determines their strengths and weaknesses, while Skeledirge has a secondary Ghost-typing it gains when Crocalor evolves into it. Fuecoco is voiced by Zeno Robinson in the English dub of Pokémon Horizons: The Series, while it is voiced by Daiki Yamashita in Japanese.

== Appearances ==
Fuecoco first appeared in Pokémon Scarlet and Violet as one of the three Pokémon available for the player to select as their first Pokémon, alongside Sprigatito and Quaxly. If the player chooses a different Pokémon, Fuecoco will either be owned by the player's rival Nemona or by the academy Director Clavell, depending on which is chosen. Fuecoco also appears in other games, such as Pokémon Go and the Pokémon Trading Card Game. In the anime, one of the main characters in Pokémon Horizons: The Series, Roy, catches a Fuecoco. Fuecoco and its evolutions have been used in promotion material for the series, with plushes being produced.

== Critical reception ==
Fuecoco has received positive reception, having become a fan favorite due to its "goofier design and big happy smile" according to Fanbyte writer Imran Khan. In a Famitsu reader poll, Fuecoco was voted the second best starter from Scarlet and Violet. Another popularity poll put Fuecoco as the fourth best Pokémon available in Scarlet and Violet, as well as the most popular Scarlet and Violet starter. An Inside Games poll also ranked it as the most popular starter in Scarlet and Violet, with Inside Games staff noting that readers found it stupid and cute. Esquire writer Josh Rosenberg regarded Fuecoco as his favorite Pokémon in Scarlet and Violet, praising its design and expressing his cute aggression- a desire to affectionately squeeze cute things- for it. Den of Geek writer Matthew Byrd called Fuecoco "objectively cute," feeling that, in combination with its Fire-typing and strength, would enable it to make it more popular.

Hindustan Times writer Paurush Omar responded positively to Fuecoco in Pokémon Horizons: The Series. They stated that its singing ability and cuteness contributed to its overall likability and popularity. In addition, they felt that its "childlike disposition" made it relatable, saying that it crying over losing its food would "make anyone's heart melt." Kotaku writer Sisi Jiang agreed, calling Fuecoco the "breakout star" of Pokémon Horizons, noting how its appearance in the anime has led to fans picking Fuecoco as their favorite. They stated that the positive reception was due to both its cute appearance and its singing ability. Fellow Kotaku writer Ashley Bardhan felt that it was the best starter, attributing its popularity to its design, personality, and power. Similar to fans not wanting Sprigatito to stand on two legs when it evolved, there was also a fan reaction for people who wanted Fuecoco to not stand on all fours when it evolved.

Fuecoco has been noted for its strength in the games "Nuzlocke" challenges, a popular fan-challenge wherein a Pokémon cannot be used after it is KOed. It has been noted for its strong type combination and moveset being powerful against many important trainers in the game, allowing for the challenge to become notably easier due to its presence alone. This has led to popular Nuzlockers and content creators, such as Pokémon Challenges, to suggest that players ban it from use to make runs more interesting.
