= Dot (given name) =

Dot is a given name, often a short form (hypocorism) of the female name Dorothy, and a nickname. Notable people and characters with the name include:

== Women ==
- Dot Allison (born 1969), Scottish singer and songwriter
- Dot Bailey (1916–2009), New Zealand cricketer
- Dot Farley (1881–1971), American film actress
- Dot Germain (born 1947), American LPGA golfer
- Dot Laughton (1913–1982), Australian cricketer
- Dot Lemon (1907–1986), early American aviator and barnstormer
- Dot Moore (1914–2007), American television personality
- Dot Richardson (born 1961), American physician, softball coach and former player
- Dot Wiggin, singer and guitarist in the Shaggs
- Dot Wilkinson (1921–2023), American softball player and bowler, member of the Halls of Fame of both sports
- Aditi Saigal or Dot (born 1998), Indian singer and actress

== Men ==
- Dot Fulghum (1900–1947), American Major League Baseball player in the 1921 season

== Fictional characters ==
- Dot, the title character of Dot and the Kangaroo, an 1899 children's book by Ethel C. Pedley and derivative works
- Dot, the title character of Dot and Tot of Merryland, a 1901 novel by L. Frank Baum
- Dot, a character in the 1998 Disney-Pixar 3D computer-animated film A Bug's Life
- Dot, a character in the Stephen Sondheim musical Sunday in the Park with George
- Dot, a character in the massively multiplayer online game Club Penguin
- Dot, the oldest Cat Brother in the anime series Shima Shima Tora no Shimajirou
- Dot, a Simon Kidgits character developed by Simon Brand Ventures
- Dot, a character from the 2023 anime Pokémon Horizons
- Little Dot, a comic book character
- Dot Branning, also known as Dot Cotton, a character in the British soap opera EastEnders
- Dot Comet, the titular protagonist of the animated preschool television series Dot.
- Dot Cottan, a character in the BBC police procedural drama Line of Duty
- Dot Flagston, twin sister to Ditto in the comic strip Hi and Lois
- Dot Matrix, a character in the Canadian animated television series ReBoot
- Dot Pixis, a character in the anime series Attack on Titan
- Dot Starlight, one of the first eight Lalaloopsy dolls released
- Dot Tattler, a character in the horror anthology television series American Horror Story
- Dot Warner, a character in the 1990s animated television series Animaniacs

== See also ==
- Dots Miller (1886–1923), American Major League Baseball player
- Dottie, another given name
