= Liko (Pokémon) =

Character in the Pokémon anime series

- Pokémon character
- Official artwork of Liko from Pokémon Horizons: The Series
- First appearance: "The Pendant That Starts It All: Part One" (2023)
- Designed by: Ken Sugimori (initial designs)
- Voiced by: EN: Alejandra Reynoso; JA: Minori Suzuki

In-universe information
- Home: Cabo Poco, Paldea

Liko (Japanese: リコ, Hepburn: Riko) is a character who appears in the Pokémon anime series. She is one of the two main characters alongside Roy taking over the role from the previous main character, Ash Ketchum, in Pokémon Horizons: The Series. She is a young girl who hails from the Paldea region, and is attending the Indigo Academy in the Kanto region. She owns a mysterious pendant from her grandmother – actually the Legendary Pokémon Terapagos in a dormant state – which results in her being targeted by a mysterious organization known as the Explorers. She is voiced by Minori Suzuki in Japanese and Alejandra Reynoso in English.

Since Liko's debut, she has received a positive response, primarily for her distinct personality, especially in comparison to previous series lead Ash Ketchum. She has also been highlighted for her status as the anime's first female protagonist.

== Conception and design ==
Liko's initial design was designed by Ken Sugimori, and she is voiced by Minori Suzuki in Japanese and Alejandra Reynoso in English. She has blue hair, a blue shirt, a yellow pocket, and an L hairpin, possibly referencing the L on Ash Ketchum's hat. Liko's introduction was stated to be due to wanting to experience the "Pokémon" world through a different lens." Liko was designed in contrast to Ash; whereas he had a set goal in mind, Liko was designed to have an internal journey about what she wanted her goal to be.

== Appearances ==
Liko is a young girl who attends the Indigo Academy in the Kanto region. She is a student who came from abroad; she hails from the Paldea region. Liko is introverted, which leads to her constantly feeling nervous about how she acts. She quickly befriends her roommate Ann, and eventually is paired with the Pokémon Sprigatito as her first Pokémon. Sprigatito is initially cold to Liko, though it warms up to her as the series progresses.

Liko possesses a pendant that was a gift from her grandmother, which is actually the Legendary Pokémon Terapagos. The antagonistic Explorers group seeks to obtain the pendant from Liko, and attack her at the Academy. Friede and the Rising Volt Tacklers, a band of travelling adventurers, come to her rescue, and she ends up joining them on their adventures. She is uncertain of her future, and attempts to work it out as the series progresses.

Liko has appeared in several manga series based on Pokémon Horizons.

== Reception ==
Liko's introduction to the series has been met with a positive critical response. Due to being the first time a new protagonist appeared in the show, she has frequently drawn comparisons to previous series protagonist Ash Ketchum. She has been highlighted as having a distinct personality from him that set her apart as a character, which was considered a reason that helped make Pokémon Horizons: The Series feel fresh as a series.

The Mary Sue writer El Kuiper highlighted Liko's uncertainty about her future, stating that it helped the show as a whole have more freedom than it did previously, writing that "the anime can take its time with its storytelling because Liko is taking the time to find herself." She also highlighted Liko's uncertainty and internal narration, which helped the audience grow more attached to Liko as a character. Kotaku writer Kenneth Shepard also responded positively to the character's social anxiety, stating that it helped Liko feel much more relatable to viewers than Ash. Liko's journey to find herself was stated as giving the anime a purpose and destination that previous series had lacked, and allowed for memorable storylines than what would have existed prior. The Escapist writer Amanda Kay Oaks highlighted Liko's personality, believing it to be much more relatable than that of Ash. She highlighted Liko's social anxiety, stating that "Ash never hesitated to say what he was thinking out loud, but for Liko, that's part of her journey, and it's nice that we get to hear her thinking it through. In this way, we get closer to her inner life and understand her motivations, her fears, and all her uncertainty." She also highlighted Liko's status as the series' first female lead character. Liko's status as a female lead was highlighted. CBR writer Courtney McClure expressed optimism about a female character being in the lead role, due to the fact that Liko's role and goals would not be as sidelined as previous female main characters had been. She expressed optimism about Liko's role, believing that she would be able to provide a positive role model to young girls.

In a review for the series, GamesRadar+ writer Bradley Russell echoed similar sentiments, stating that he felt optimistic about Liko's more anxious personality and believed a similar response would be felt from fans. However, he felt the character "faded into the background" of episodes due to her more subdued personality, and that she "oscillates wildly from endearing to oddly irritating" throughout the series. Liko's capture of the Pokémon Hatenna was considered a good method of developing the character, with the similarities in personality between the pair being cited as a method to further Liko's growth.
