= Auntie Dottie (disambiguation) =

Auntie Dottie is the well-known nickname of American festival organizer Dottie Thompson, who is credited with co-founding and developing the Merrie Monarch Festival.

Auntie Dottie may also refer to:

- Auntie Dottie, a character from Whizziwig
- Auntie Dottie, a character from Peppa Pig

== See also ==
- Dottie (disambiguation)
