= Dottie (disambiguation) =

Dottie or Dotty is a feminine given name, nickname and stage name.

Dottie may also refer to:

- Tropical Storm Dottie, in the 1976 Atlantic season
- Dottie (album), a 1978 album by Dottie West
- dotty, a graphical user interface for Graphviz, a package of open-source software tools
- Dotty, a 1990 fantasy novel by R. A. Lafferty
- Dotty, also known as Amplify Dot, a British radio DJ and rapper
- Dotty's, a chain of American slot-machine parlors
