= Dottie =

Dottie or Dotty is a feminine given name or nickname (most often a short form of Dorothy) which may refer to:

== People ==
- Dottie Alexander (born 1972), keyboardist for of Montreal, an American indie pop band
- Dottie Ardina (born 1993), Filipino professional golfer
- Dotty Attie (born 1938), American painter and printmaker
- Dottie Wiltse Collins (1923–2008), American pitcher in the All-American Girls Professional Baseball League
- Dottie Dodgion (1929–2021), American jazz drummer and singer
- Dottie Frazier (1922–2022), American diver, designer, and dive shop owner
- Dottie Green (1921–1992), American player in the All-American Girls Professional Baseball League
- Dottie Hunter (1916–2005), Canadian player in the All-American Girls Professional Baseball League
- Dottie Lamm (born 1937), American feminist, women's rights activist, educator, author, and speaker
- Dotty Lynch (1945–2014), American academic, journalist and political pollster
- Dotty Mack, star of the 1950s American variety television series The Dotty Mack Show
- Dottie Martin (born 1937), First Lady of North Carolina
- Dottie Peoples (born 1950), American gospel singer
- Dottie Pepper (born 1965), American golfer (as Dottie Mochrie) and television golf broadcaster
- Dottie Rambo (1934–2008), American gospel singer and songwriter born Joyce Reba Luttrell
- Dottie Ray (1922–2016), American journalist and radio host
- Art and Dotty Todd (1913–2000), American husband-and-wife singing duo
- Dottie West (1932–1991), American country music singer and songwriter
- Dottie Potter Zenaty, field hockey coach at Springfield College, Massachusetts, from 1970 to 2003
- Amplify Dot (born 1988), British broadcaster, also known as Dotty

== Stage names ==
- Dottie Danger, a stage name of American singer Belinda Carlisle (born 1958)
- Another stage name of English rapper and broadcaster Amplify Dot
- Ddotty, South Korean YouTuber (born 1986)

== Fictional characters ==
- Dottie, main character in Dottie's Magic Pockets
- Dottie Hinson, character in A League of Their Own
- Dottie Thorson, character in American crime drama television series The Huntress
- Dotty Cotton, on the UK soap opera EastEnders
- Dotty, Leah's stuffed elephant she got from the fair in Shimmer and Shine
- Dotty, title character of Dotty Dripple, an American comic strip (1944–74)
- Dotty, title character of Dear Dotty, a British 1954 television series
- Dotty, a rabbit villager in the video game series Animal Crossing

== Animals ==
- Dottie, a fish in the American television series FishCenter Live
- Dotty, a donkey awarded the PDSA Certificate for Animal Bravery or Devotion in 2011

== See also ==
- Dot (given name)
