= Sprigatito, Floragato, and Meowscarada =

Pokémon species

- Pokémon characters
- From left to right: Floragato, Meowscarada, and Sprigatito as they appear in Pokémon Scarlet and Violet
- First game: Pokémon Scarlet and Violet (2022)
- Designed by: Hiroyuki Tani (Sprigatito); Ken Sugimori (Floragato); Mari Shimazaki (Meowscarada)
- Voiced by: English: Kira Buckland (TV series); Japanese: Megumi Hayashibara (TV series); Kei Shindō (Meowscarada; Paldean Winds)

In-universe information
- Species: Pokémon
- Type: Grass (Sprigatito, Floragato); Grass and Dark (Meowscarada)

Sprigatito (/ˌsprɪɡəˈtiːtoʊ/), Floragato (/ˌflɔːrəˈɡɑːtoʊ/), and Meowscarada (/miˈaʊskəˈrɑːdə/)—known in Japan as Nyahoja (Japanese: ニャオハ, Hepburn: Nyaoha), Nyarote (ニャローテ, Nyarōte), and Masquernya (マスカーニャ, Masukānya) respectively—are Pokémon species in Nintendo and Game Freak's Pokémon media franchise. First introduced in the video games Pokémon Scarlet and Violet, they have since appeared in multiple games, as well as various merchandise.

Classified as a Grass-type Pokémon, Sprigatito, Floragato, and Meowscarada are a trio of cat-like Pokémon. Sprigatito is the first stage of its evolutionary line, evolving into Floragato and eventually Meowscarada. It is one of the three Pokémon available at the start of Scarlet and Violet, alongside Fuecoco and Quaxly. The three have been subject to much discussion, primarily around Sprigatito and the designs of its evolutionary forms compared to past designs in the series. Various aspects of the evolutionary line have resulted in Internet memes.

== Conception and development ==
Sprigatito, Floragato, and Meowscarada are a trio of species of fictional creatures called Pokémon created for the Pokémon media franchise. Developed by Game Freak and published by Nintendo, the Japanese franchise began in 1996 with the video games Pokémon Red and Green for the Game Boy, which were later released in North America as Pokémon Red and Blue in 1998. In these games and their sequels, the player assumes the role of a Trainer whose goal is to capture and use the creatures' special abilities to combat other Pokémon. Some Pokémon can transform into stronger species through a process called evolution via various means, such as exposure to specific items. Each Pokémon has one or two elemental types, which define its advantages and disadvantages when battling other Pokémon. A major goal in each game is to complete the Pokédex, a comprehensive Pokémon encyclopedia, by capturing, evolving, and trading with other Trainers to obtain individuals from all Pokémon species.

Sprigatito is a small green cat-like Pokémon. It is one of the three Pokemon players can obtain as their first in Pokémon Scarlet and Violet, and it can evolve into Floragato and Meowscarada after gaining enough experience. In the anime, Sprigatito, Floragato and Meowscarada voiced by Kira Buckland in English and voiced by Megumi Hayashibara in Japanese.

== Appearances ==
Sprigatito first appeared in Pokémon Scarlet and Violet as one of the three Pokémon available for the player to select as their first Pokémon, alongside Fuecoco and Quaxly. Sprigatito evolves into Floragato and eventually Meowscarada. All three forms are Grass-type Pokémon, though Meowscarada gains a Dark type. If the player chooses a different Pokémon, Sprigatito will either be owned by Nemona or Director Clavell, depending on which is chosen. Sprigatito also appears in other games, such as Pokémon Go and the Pokémon Trading Card Game. In the anime, the main protagonist of Pokémon Horizons: The Series, Liko, obtains a Sprigatito as her first Pokémon. Though it is not fond of Liko at first, it slowly begins to show affection for her as the series progresses. Sprigatito eventually evolves into Floragato and later Meowscarada. Sprigatito and its evolutions have been used in promotion material for the series, with plushes being produced.

== Reception ==
Sprigatito was well-received by fans and critics, being considered a cute Pokémon. In a Famitsu poll, Sprigatito was named the most popular of the three Starter Pokémon in Scarlet and Violet, receiving more than 40 percent of the votes. Meanwhile, a Nintendo Life poll ranked Sprigatito in second place, behind Fuecoco. Inside Games writer Chappurin felt its cute design led to it ranking second in the website's poll, in which it received 36 percent of the votes. Polygon writer Cass Marshall considered Sprigatito her personal favorite of the three Scarlet and Violet starters, owing it to her enjoyment of cats. Sprigatito has been the subject of memes surrounding marijuana, given the nickname "Weed Cat". The Mary Sue writer Chelsea Steiner was excited for Sprigatito, particularly in terms of design due in part to the weed angle. Comic Book Resources writer Christian Markle and Screen Rant writer Carlyle Edmundson both drew comparisons between Sprigatito and Ash Ketchum's Pikachu in the anime.

(From left to right) Litten, Torracat, and Incineroar as they appear in artwork for the series. Litten's progression into a bipedal, humanoid Pokémon was a large reason for the debate around Sprigatito's potential evolutions.

Sprigatito's evolutions have been the subject of commentary, with many focusing around its evolution. Upon its reveal, fans of the series noticed similarities between Sprigatito and another cat-based first partner Pokémon, Litten, and grew concerned that Sprigatito would evolve to be bipedal as Litten did. Polygon writer Cass Marshall noted people's worries about Sprigatito evolving into a bipedal Pokémon, citing the drastic change from the "sweet little" Litten into the "raging, bipedal luchador" Incineroar. Marshall personally hoped to see Sprigatito remain quadrupedal. Inside Games writer Chappurin discussed the propensity of cat Pokémon changing their stance when they evolve, noting how fans called for Sprigatito to stay on four legs as a result. The discussion surrounding Sprigatito's evolution led to the phrase "Sprigatito Stand" becoming one of the most used words on social media web forums in 2022 as well as an Internet meme.

Reception to Floragato, Sprigatito's evolution, was generally positive, despite the initial concern around its bipedal evolution. Inside Games noted that the design maintained numerous aspects of Sprigatito's design, additionally stating that it had become "stylish" while doing so. Its evolution into Meowscarada was more mixed. Polygon writer Ana Diaz noted that the prevalence of bipedal Pokémon had become a series cliche. This concern over it standing was due in part to fans not wanting Sprigatito to become rugged in a similar manner to Incineroar. Automaton Media writer Ayuo Kawase felt the reason why people did not want it to become bipedal was because people got so attached to how cute it was. Despite complaints, Chappurin noted that the evolutions had begun to grow on fans. Hideaki Fujiwara of Automaton Media felt that Meowscarada going with a "smarter" direction than a "strong" direction like they did with Incineroar helped influence Meowscarada's popularity. Meowscarada's tendency to become jealous was also stated to have influenced Meowscarada's popularity somewhat. It was credited with dispelling concerns regarding Sprigatito standing and overall has been well received, with Inside Games stating its slender and cute cat-like design helped make it a popular Pokémon with fans. In a poll conducted by GameWith, Meowscarada was the third most popular Pokémon in Japan. One year later, in 2023, a poll ranked it as the most popular overall.

Critics have expressed worries about Sprigatito evolving to develop sexual characteristics. TheGamer writer Eric Switzer felt that the franchise leaned too heavily on feminine Pokémon designs, worrying that Sprigatito would also evolve in a similar manner. Meowscarada's bipedal design and approximately similar height to the player led to some players to interpret it to seem as if they were kissing it. Some players noted this aspect as a potential design element, with Sprigatito evolving to be bipedal out of affection for its trainer.
