= Minori Suzuki =

Japanese voice actress and singer

- 鈴木 みのり
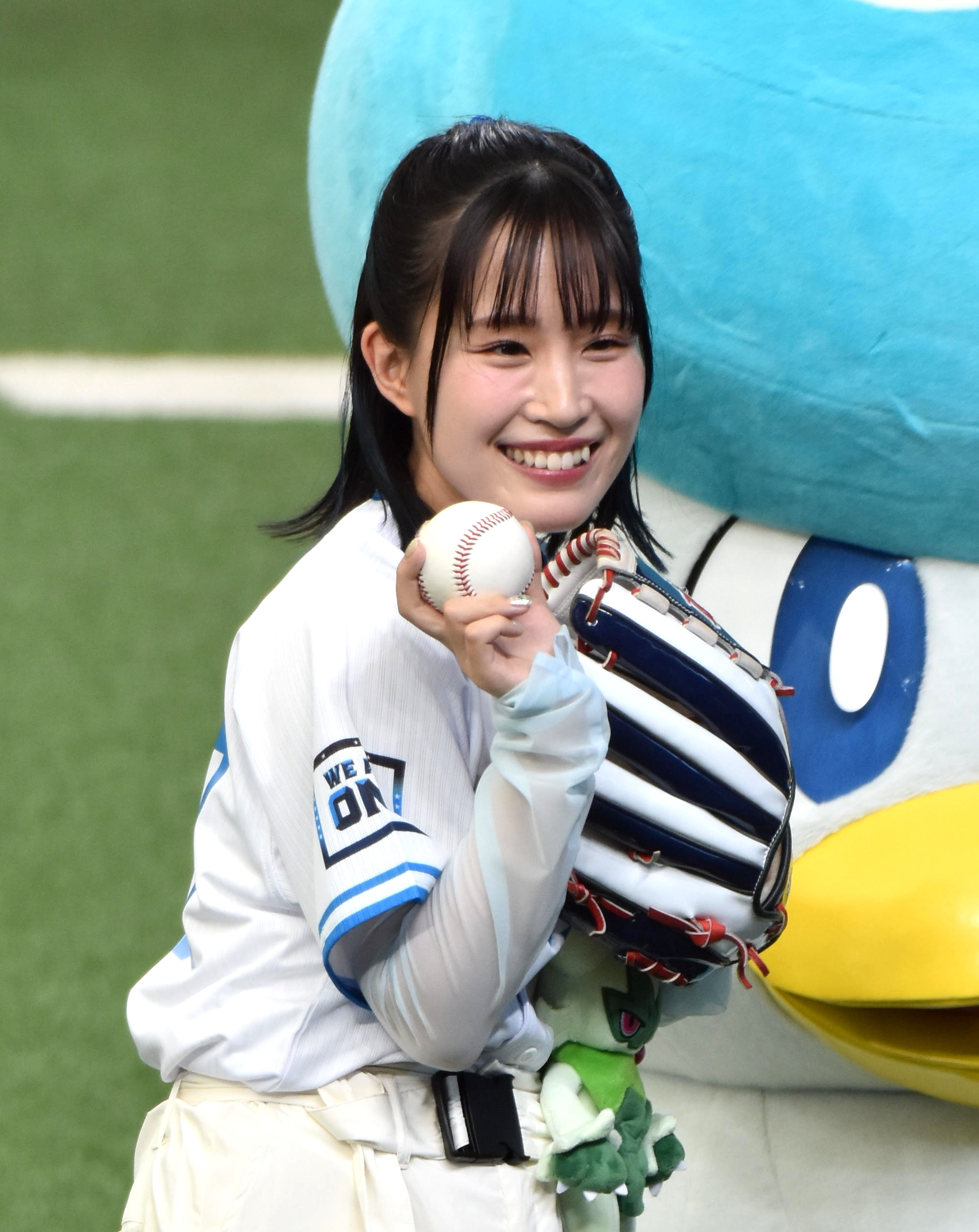
- Suzuki in 2024
- Born: October 1, 1997 (age 29); Aichi Prefecture, Japan
- Occupations: Voice actress; singer
- Years active: 2015–present
- Agent: Aoni Production
- Notable work: Macross Delta as Freyja Wion; Pokémon Horizons: The Series as Liko; Onegai AiPri as Ema Mochinaga
- Musical career
- Genres: Pop; anison
- Instrument: Vocals
- Years active: 2016–present
- Label: Victor Entertainment / Flying Dog

Minori Suzuki (鈴木 みのり, Suzuki Minori; born October 1, 1997) is a Japanese voice actress and singer affiliated with Aoni Production. She started her career after passing an audition for the role of Freyja Wion in the 2016 anime television series Macross Delta, beating 8,000 other auditionees for the role. She also voiced Liko in Pokémon Horizons: The Series. She also voiced Ema Mochinaga in Onegai AiPri.

== Biography ==
=== Career ===
Suzuki loved singing ever since she was a child, and held an interest in voice-related work (such as singing, narration, and acting). In her elementary school years, she began to watch late night anime, which inspired her to become a voice actor to do all the things she wanted to do. After saving up money working part-time in her first year of high school, she began to take lessons at a voice acting school in Tokyo once a week. In October 2014, the creators of the Macross franchise announced that auditions were going to be held, with the winner being cast in a role in the upcoming anime television series Macross Delta. Her mother was a fan of Macross Frontier, and knowing Suzuki's dream of becoming involved in entertainment, pushed her to participate in the audition. Having been inspired to participate in the audition due to her idolizing Megumi Nakajima, voice actress of Macross Frontier's Ranka Lee, Suzuki auditioned for the Macross Delta role, and in 2015 was selected for the role from a pool of approximately 8,000 other applicants. She was cast as Freyja Wion, the lead female character in the series, and a member of the fictional idol group Walküre.

Walküre's first single, which includes the series' opening theme "Ichido Dake no Koi Nara" (一度だけの恋なら; "If I Love Only Once") and ending theme "Rune ga Pikatto Hikattara" (ルンがピカッと光ったら; "When the Rune Sparkles"), as well as the song "Ikenai Borderline" (いけないボーダーライン; "Forbidden Borderline"), was released on May 11, 2016.

In July 2017, Suzuki and Macross Delta co-star JUNNA were guests at Anime Expo in Los Angeles.

Suzuki made her solo debut in 2018 when she performed the opening theme to the anime television series Ms. Koizumi Loves Ramen Noodles.

In late January 20, 2020, Suzuki made her YouTube debut to promote one of her singles "Yozora" for the anime Koisuru Asteroid.

In 2023, she stared voicing Liko, the protagonist of the anime series Pokémon Horizons: The Series. On September 30, 2023, Suzuki announced that she left her talent agency E-Stone Music The following day, Aoni Production announced that she had joined their agency.

=== Personal life ===
Suzuki lists Maaya Sakamoto, Megumi Nakajima, Nagi Yanagi and Galileo Galilei as among her influences in voice acting and music. Suzuki was fond of Nakajima in particular, once having participated in one of the latter's handshake events.

== Filmography ==
=== Anime ===
List of voice performances in anime
Year	Title	Role	Source
2016	Macross Delta	Freyja Wion	
2016	Digimon Universe: App Monsters	Ai's friend (ep 1), Event attendee (ep 42)	
2017	Kirakira PreCure a la Mode	Boy (eps 18, 49)	
2017	King's Game The Animation	Nami Hirano	
2018	Cardcaptor Sakura: Clear Card	Akiho Shinomoto	
2018	Record of Grancrest War	Ema	
2018	Kakuriyo: Bed and Breakfast for Spirits	Kai and Mei	
2018	Chio's School Road	Momo Shinozuka	
2018	A Certain Magical Index III	Floris	
2019	Kochoki: Wakaki Nobunaga	Ikoma Kitsuno	
2020	Show by Rock!! Mashumairesh!!	Uiui	
2021	Show by Rock!! Stars!!	Uiui	
2022	I'm Quitting Heroing	Dianette	
2022	Deaimon	Mitsuru Horikawa	
2022	Black Summoner	Sera	
2023	Sugar Apple Fairy Tale	Benjamin	
2023–present	Pokémon Horizons: The Series	Liko	
2023	The Girl I Like Forgot Her Glasses	Maho Tōyama	
2023	Pluto	Uran	
2024	Days with My Stepsister	Shiori Yomiuri	
2024	Demon Lord, Retry! R	Mink	
2025	Zenshu	Memmeln	
2026	The Classroom of a Black Cat and a Witch	Merrow Pisces	
2026	Onegai AiPri	Ema Mochinaga	
2026	Chiikawa the Movie: The Secret of the Mermaid Island	Siren	
2026	Dark Machine: The Animation	Bianca	
2026	Hotel Inhumans	Mitsuru Matsuki	
2027	Murciélago	Hinako Tozakura	

=== Video games ===
List of voice performances in video games
Year	Title	Role	Source
2016	Macross Delta Scramble	Freyja Wion	
2017	Danganronpa V3: Killing Harmony	Angie Yonaga	
2017	THE iDOLM@STER CINDERELLA GIRLS	Hajime Fujiwara	
2017	Kantai Collection	Amagiri / Sagiri	
2017	Azur Lane	Crescent / Comet	
2018	Tokimeki Idol	Minato Tsukishima	
2019	Magia Record: Puella Magi Madoka Magica Side Story	Sakurako Hiiragi/Rumor of the Eternal Sakura	
2019	Arknights	Sora	
2020	Granblue Fantasy	Yatima	
2020	Project Sekai: Colorful Stage! feat. Hatsune Miku	Ena Shinonome	
2021	Umamusume: Pretty Derby	Agnes Digital	
2024	Honkai Impact 3rd	Senadina	
2024	Wuthering Waves	Lumi	
2025	Groove Coaster Future Performers	Ran Onizuka	

== Discography ==
=== Studio albums ===
List of studio albums
Year	Album details	Catalog no.		Oricon	
Year	Album details	Regular edition	Limited edition	Peak position	Weeks charted
2018	Mirumae ni Tobe! (見る前に飛べ!): Released: December 31, 2018; Label: FlyingDog	VTCL-60477	VTZL-151	23	2
2020	Jо̄mino (上ミノ): Released: August 26, 2020; Label: FlyingDog	VTCL-60531	VTZL-175	30	1

=== Singles ===
List of released singles
Year	Song(s)	Catalog no.		Oricon		Album
Year	Song(s)	Regular edition	Limited edition	Peak position	Weeks charted	Album
2018	FEELING AROUND: Ms. Koizumi Loves Ramen Noodles opening theme; Released: January 24, 2018; Label: FlyingDog	VTCL-35267	VTZL-142	21	7	Mirumae ni Tobe!
2018	Rewind (リワインド) / Crosswalk: Cardcaptor Sakura: Clear Card second ending theme; Amanchu! Advance opening theme; Released: May 9, 2018; Label: FlyingDog	VTCL-35272 (Sakura disc); VTCL-35271 (Amachu! disc)		14	6	Mirumae ni Tobe!
2019	Dame wa Dame (ダメハダメ): Magical Sempai ending theme; Released: August 19, 2019	VTCL-35306	—N/a	27	2	Jо̄mino
2020	Yozora (夜空): Asteroid in Love ending theme; Released: February 12, 2020; Label: FlyingDog	VTCL-35311	VTZL-166 (Disc A); VTZL-167 (Disc B)	19	6	Jо̄mino
2021	Saihate (サイハテ): Fena: Pirate Princess ending theme; Released: November 10, 2021; Label: FlyingDog	VTCL-35331; VTCL-35332 (Fena disc)	VTZL-191	TBA	TBA	
