= Nemona =

Pokémon Champion

- Pokémon character
- Nemona in Pokémon Scarlet and Violet
- First appearance: Pokémon Scarlet and Violet (2022)
- Voiced by: English: Yolis Arroyo (TV series) Olivia Vidas (ONA); Japanese: Eri Kitamura (TV series) Eriko Matsui (ONA)

In-universe information
- Home: Cabo Poco, Paldea

Nemona, known in Japan as Nemo (Japanese: ネモ), is a character in the 2022 video games Pokémon Scarlet and Violet. She is both a rival to the protagonist and a Champion of the Paldea Region. She is obsessed with battling and frequently engages in Pokémon battles with the protagonist.

== Concept and creation ==
Developed by Game Freak and published by Nintendo, the Pokémon franchise began in Japan in 1996 with the release of the video games Pokémon Red and Blue for the Game Boy. In these games, the player assumes the role of a Pokémon Trainer whose goal is to capture and train creatures called Pokémon. Players use the creatures' special abilities to combat other Pokémon, both in the wild as well as those used by other Trainers. Created for the 2022 sequels Pokémon Scarlet and Violet, Nemona acts as the player's "rival", a type of trainer that acts as a boss the player must defeat during the course of the game multiple times, growing more difficult with each encounter.

Nemona is voiced by Eri Kitamura in Japanese and Yolis Arroyo in English in Pokémon Horizons: The Series. Kitamura attempted to emulate Nemona's passion found in the video games, causing her to sweat while voicing her. Ayano Takeda was responsible for the creation of a short story starring Nemona, and felt she needed to ensure its quality due to the character's popularity.

== Appearances ==
Nemona first appeared in Pokémon Scarlet and Violet. She is a rival to the protagonist, picking from either Sprigatito, Fuecoco, or Quaxly, with her choice being based on which of the three is weak to the one that the player chose. She is obsessed with battling and is always excited to have a Pokémon battle with the protagonist. She is a Champion of the Paldea Region, attending the same academy as the protagonist. She battles the protagonist at different points in the game, before the protagonist eventually defeats her after defeating the Top Champion Geeta and becoming a Paldea Champion themself. Nemona eventually accompanies them, along with Arven and Penny, to Area Zero, the final area of the game.

In the epilogue, Mochi Mayhem, she accompanies the player, along with Arven and Penny, as they travel to Kitakami. It is revealed that Nemona easily defeated Kieran while she was there. Later, Nemona stops speaking, then disappears entirely, reappearing later at Loyalty Plaza, where she has been mind-controlled by Pecharunt's toxic mochi. She battles the player and loses, and after Pecharunt is also defeated and caught, she and all the other mind-controlled humans return to normal. After the epilogue is finished, she can be invited to the League Club Room, where she can be rematched.

== Reception ==
Nemona has been generally well received by fans and critics. Screen Rant writer Devin Ellis Friend felt she was the series' most relatable rival. He discussed how Nemona reflected how, much like how players have grown up and become more experienced, Nemona reflects rivals becoming more experienced as well. The Gamer writer Stacey Henley was similarly positive towards her, feeling that she was a fresh concept for the series and one of Scarlet and Violet's "brightest sparks." She argued that despite the bugs and soullessness that plague the world of Scarlet and Violet, Nemona can be charming due in part to her being a "tomboy with a brick for a brain and a heart of gold."

Early on, Nemona gained a reputation among the community for being a stalker of the player-character, though she was generally well received by them. Game Rant writer Joshua Duckworth noted how Nemona trended on Twitter, with suggestions that Nemona's obsessions with battles was a sign of neurodiversity. Inside Games writer Oonappa discussed how she has been described as "too battle-crazy" due to her love of battles. They expressed surprise to see the official Pokémon Twitter account acknowledge her battle-crazy style in a tweet encouraging people to battle 24 hours a day, seven days a week, 365 days a year. Her appearance in the Pokémon Horizons: The Series anime series was met with excitement by fans of the series. Engadget writer Sam Rutherford described her as a "big sister" type character, comparing her positively to the character Hop from Pokémon Sword and Shield, finding her more likable and helpful. Writer Sawasdee Otsuka also described her as a big sister type of character, discussing how her interest in battles has drawn comparisons to the character Hisoka Morow from Hunter × Hunter, and arguing that their obsession with combat are similar. They also expressed interest in seeing how Nemona would be depicted, describing her as a new take on a rival in Pokémon. Fellow Inside Games writer Chappurin discussed how their initial impression was to view her as a big sister type. They noted that this assessment was correct, but they did not expect just how obsessed with Pokémon battles she would be, also comparing her to Hisoka. The challenge Nemona posed in The Teal Mask was discussed by Automaton writer Kosuke Takenaka, who noted how quickly Nemona was able to get strong Pokémon in that DLC.

4gamer's guest author for their series of irregular autobiographical essays on games that have inspired queer gamers, Norihito Kodota, attempted to analyze the game through a queer lens to explain why he found Scarlet and Violet and some of their elements queer-friendly, broadly using this term to describe any people "who differ from the accepted norm." Writing specifically about Nemona as a significant character in the game, they emphasized how they felt the player's in-game rivalry with her felt more like an equal rivalry than the "competitive rivalry" of a male-dominated society. Commenting on the game's treatment of the concept of "rival," Kodota also suggested that if the player plays a female protagonist, their relationship with Nemona could be read as a sisterhood or queer relationship.
