= Celestial (Ed Sheeran song) =

Single by Ed Sheeran
- Released: 29 September 2022
- Genre: Pop
- Length: 3:29
- Label: Asylum; Atlantic
- Songwriters: Ed Sheeran; Steve Mac; Johnny McDaid
- Producers: Ed Sheeran; Steve Mac

Ed Sheeran singles chronology
"Lonely Lovers" (2022)	"Celestial" (2022)	"Call on Me" (2022)

Music video
- "Celestial" on YouTube

"Celestial" is a song by English singer-songwriter Ed Sheeran, released as a single on 29 September 2022. It was released in collaboration with The Pokémon Company and appears in the end credits of Pokémon Scarlet and Violet, released on 18 November 2022. Sheeran co-wrote the song alongside Steve Mac and Johnny McDaid, and produced it with Mac. The song was released alongside its music video, which includes Sheeran interacting with a variety of Pokémon.

A remix of the song by Toby Fox also appears in the credits of The Hidden Treasure of Area Zero DLC of Scarlet and Violet.

== Background ==
Ed Sheeran is a self-proclaimed lifelong Pokémon fan, and had collaborated with The Pokémon Company before. From 22 to 30 November 2021, Pokémon Go featured an in-game performance by Sheeran. In August 2022, Sheeran welcomed participants of the 2022 Pokémon World Championships in a video message.

On 22 September 2022, Sheeran wrote on his Instagram: "I met the people from Pokémon when I was travelling in Japan, and we joked about me writing a song for them", which led to the collaboration. In a separate statement, Sheeran wrote that he liked Pokémon since primary school, and called it "such an honour to add a song into a Pokémon game and shoot a nostalgic video too".

== Composition ==
"Celestial" is a pop song in the key of D major, with a tempo of 123 BPM. It is based around a chord progression of G–Bm–D–A (IV–vi–I–V). This progression can also be seen in the song's video, written in a notebook Sheeran keeps.

== Music video ==
The music video was also released on 29 September 2022, and was directed by Yuichi Kodama. It depicts Sheeran walking around Richmond, London and interacting with a variety of sketch-style Pokémon, including a Snorlax that saves Sheeran from a car accident and a Lapras that takes him across the Thames. The appearances of the Pokémon were drawn by art director Yu Nagaba. According to an NME article, Nagaba emulated the way Sheeran drew Pokémon when he was younger.

== Charts ==
=== Weekly charts ===
Weekly chart performance for "Celestial"
Chart (2022–2023)	Peak position
Australia (ARIA)	35
Austria (Ö3 Austria Top 40)	28
Belarus Airplay (TopHit)	119
Belgium (Ultratop 50 Flanders)	7
Canada Hot 100 (Billboard)	63
CIS Airplay (TopHit)	43
Croatia (HRT)	3
Czech Republic Airplay (ČNS IFPI)	2
Denmark (Tracklisten)	34
Estonia Airplay (TopHit)	7
France (SNEP)	73
Germany (GfK)	46
Global 200 (Billboard)	42
Greece International (IFPI)	88
Hungary (Rádiós Top 40)	22
Ireland (IRMA)	23
Italy (FIMI)	88
Japan Hot 100 (Billboard)	45
Japan Digital Singles (Oricon)	22
Latvia Airplay (LAIPA)	9
Lebanon (Lebanese Top 20)	7
Lithuania Airplay (TopHit)	19
Netherlands (Dutch Top 40)	7
Netherlands (Single Top 100)	36
New Zealand Hot Singles (RMNZ)	3
Norway (VG-lista)	36
Poland Airplay (ZPAV)	36
Portugal (AFP)	175
Romania Airplay (TopHit)	14
Slovakia Airplay (ČNS IFPI)	1
South Africa Streaming (TOSAC)	87
South Korea Download (Circle)	71
Sweden (Sverigetopplistan)	27
Switzerland (Schweizer Hitparade)	16
UK Singles (Official Charts)	6
US Bubbling Under Hot 100 (Billboard)	6

=== Monthly charts ===
Monthly chart performance for "Celestial"
Chart (2023)	Peak position
CIS Airplay (TopHit)	44
Estonia Airplay (TopHit)	10
Lithuania Airplay (TopHit)	19
Romania Airplay (TopHit)	15

=== Year-end charts ===
2022 year-end chart performance for "Celestial"
Chart (2022)	Position
Belgium (Ultratop 50 Flanders)	108
Netherlands (Dutch Top 40)	45

2023 year-end chart performance for "Celestial"
Chart (2023)	Position
Belgium (Ultratop 50 Flanders)	63
CIS Airplay (TopHit)	126
Estonia Airplay (TopHit)	161
Lithuania Airplay (TopHit)	67
Netherlands (Dutch Top 40)	51
Romania Airplay (TopHit)	83

== Certifications ==
Certifications for "Celestial"
Region	Certification	Certified units/sales
Austria (IFPI Austria)	Gold	15,000^{‡}
Denmark (IFPI Danmark)	Gold	45,000^{‡}
France (SNEP)	Platinum	200,000^{‡}
Italy (FIMI)	Gold	50,000^{‡}
New Zealand (RMNZ)	Platinum	30,000^{‡}
United Kingdom (BPI)	Platinum	600,000^{‡}
^{‡} Sales+streaming figures based on certification alone.

== Release history ==
Release history and formats for "Celestial"
Region	Date	Format	Label	Ref.
Various	29 September 2022	Digital download; streaming	Asylum; Atlantic	
Italy	30 September 2022	Radio airplay	Warner	
