= Pokémon Scarlet and Violet =

2022 video games

Pokémon Scarlet; Pokémon Violet
- Icon art for Scarlet and Violet, depicting Koraidon (left) and Miraidon (right)
- Developer: Game Freak
- Publishers: JP: The Pokémon Company; WW: Nintendo
- Director: Shigeru Ohmori
- Producers: Akira Kinashi; Toyokazu Nonaka; Takanori Sowa; Kenji Endo
- Designer: Hiroyuki Tani
- Programmer: Katsuhiko Ichiraku
- Artists: Mana Ibe; Mari Shimazaki; James Turner
- Writer: Ryota Muranaka
- Composers: Minako Adachi; Junichi Masuda; Go Ichinose; Hiromitsu Maeba; Teruo Taniguchi; Hitomi Sato; Toby Fox
- Series: Pokémon
- Platform: Nintendo Switch
- Release: November 18, 2022
- Genre: Role-playing
- Modes: Single-player, multiplayer

Pokémon Scarlet (Note: Japanese: ポケットモンスター スカーレット, Hepburn: Poketto Monsutā Sukāretto) and Pokémon Violet (Note: Japanese: ポケットモンスター バイオレット, Hepburn: Poketto Monsutā Baioretto) are 2022 role-playing video games developed by Game Freak and published by Nintendo and The Pokémon Company for the Nintendo Switch. They are the first installments in the ninth generation of the Pokémon video game series. They were announced in February 2022 and released on November 18, 2022. The games later received a downloadable content (DLC) expansion pass storyline, The Hidden Treasure of Area Zero. The first part, The Teal Mask, was released on September 13, 2023; and the second part, The Indigo Disk, was released on December 14, 2023. Mochi Mayhem, a post-game expansion considered the epilogue to the DLC and the games themselves, was released on January 11, 2024.

Scarlet and Violet are set in the Paldea region, based on the Iberian Peninsula. The games' open world, a departure from previous installments, allows players to freely roam the region as they complete three separate campaigns. Scarlet and Violet introduce 120 new Pokémon, as well as two new regional forms and time-displaced creatures known as Paradox Pokémon. They also introduce the Terastal phenomenon, (Note: Japanese: テラスタル, Hepburn: Terasutaru) which allows a Pokémon to transform into its exclusive Tera Type. The games maintain features from previous modern Pokémon games, including large open areas and Pokémon appearing in the overworld.

The games began development immediately following the release of their predecessors, Pokémon Sword and Shield. Developers at Game Freak wished to incorporate a new art style with the games, incorporating a more realistic world design while maintaining more stylized character designs. Models and animations for species of Pokémon were re-done from prior games to fit in with this new artistic style.

Scarlet and Violet received mixed reviews from critics. The games were praised for various different aspects including the story, but were criticized for technical issues. They sold over 10 million copies in their first three days, making them Nintendo's biggest launch of all time, and over 28 million copies by December 2025. A free update for the games on Nintendo Switch 2, including improved visuals, performance, and other adjustments, was released on June 5, 2025.

== Gameplay ==
Pokémon Scarlet and Violet largely follow the same basic gameplay structure of previous Pokémon games, where players obtain creatures known as Pokémon, primarily through catching and trading, and use them to explore the world and battle other Pokémon Trainers. However, a new feature has been added which allows players to choose to battle Trainers on paths. The games introduces 112 new Pokémon, including three new Starter Pokémon, Sprigatito, Fuecoco, and Quaxly, which act as the first Pokémon players can obtain in-game and two new Legendary Pokémon, Koraidon and Miraidon, with the types of fighting-dragon and electric-dragon, who accompany players throughout the games.

Scarlet and Violet have open worlds, which include both urban areas and open wilderness without borders between the two, unlike previous installments in the Pokémon series. Players can use either Koraidon or Miraidon, depending on the games' version, as a mount in the overworld, allowing access to several abilities that can be used to traverse Paldea's terrain. Players can also use a new "Auto Battle" feature, allowing them to send out their Pokémon in the overworld and defeat Pokémon without having to enter turn-based battles. In addition to this, players are given the option of participating in three different story routes, and objectives within routes can be done in any order.

The three routes each have different gameplay styles. The first route, Victory Road, has players attempting to defeat Pokémon Gyms, a recurring goal in the series, to obtain a badge from each "Gym Leader" after defeating them in battle. Gyms can be fought in any order, unlike prior entries in the series. Once eight badges are obtained, players can battle the Elite Four and their Top Champion, Geeta. The second route, Path of Legends, involves players attempting to hunt down big and powerful "Titan Pokémon" (those Pokémon being Klawf, Bombirdier, Orthworm, Great Tusk/Iron Treads and Dondozo. The player will face Great Tusk in Pokémon Scarlet and Iron Treads in Pokémon Violet) in order to defeat them and obtain Herba Mystica items, which empower their mount with new traversal abilities such as jumping higher and climbing walls. The third route, Starfall Street, has players attempt to defeat a villainous organization consisting of rebellious students called Team Star. Players must defeat a set number of Team Star members within a time limit before proceeding to battle with their base leader. Players are tasked with defeating five of these Star Bases in order to encounter the route's final boss. Once all three routes are completed, players unlocks a fourth and final story route, which resolves the games' main story.

Up to four players can participate in battles against Terastallized Pokémon in Tera Raids. Here, the Pokémon are fighting a Gardevoir that has Terastallized into the Water-type.

Scarlet and Violet introduce the Terastal phenomenon, which gives Pokémon a crystalline appearance and changes their type, an elemental attribute of a Pokémon that determines its strengths or weaknesses, to match their unique "Tera Type". It also uses special moves such as Tera Blast, which, when used by a Terastallized Pokémon, becomes a move of the same type as the Pokémon's Tera Type. These Tera Types can be changed by players. Players can encounter wild Terastallized Pokémon, and can fight them in raids. In "Tera Raids", up to four players can battle against a Terastallized Pokémon while under a time limit. Players can only use one Pokémon each, and if the Pokémon is knocked out, the amount of time players will have left will shorten. Players can catch the raid boss once it is defeated. Players can team up with other players in Tera Raids using online features.

The games feature several new game mechanics. Players can use a new "picnic" feature to play with their party of Pokémon and make sandwiches, which give a variety of in-game boons. Players' Pokémon can also breed with each other during picnics, allowing players to obtain Pokémon from eggs. Players can also participate in picnics and sandwich making with up to four players via online features. Players can connect with other players over the internet and participate in "Union Circles", which allow players to explore the games' overworld simultaneously with up to four players. Players can trade and battle with each other over the internet.

== Plot ==
=== Setting ===
The Paldea Region, the games' setting. It greatly resembles the Iberian Peninsula.

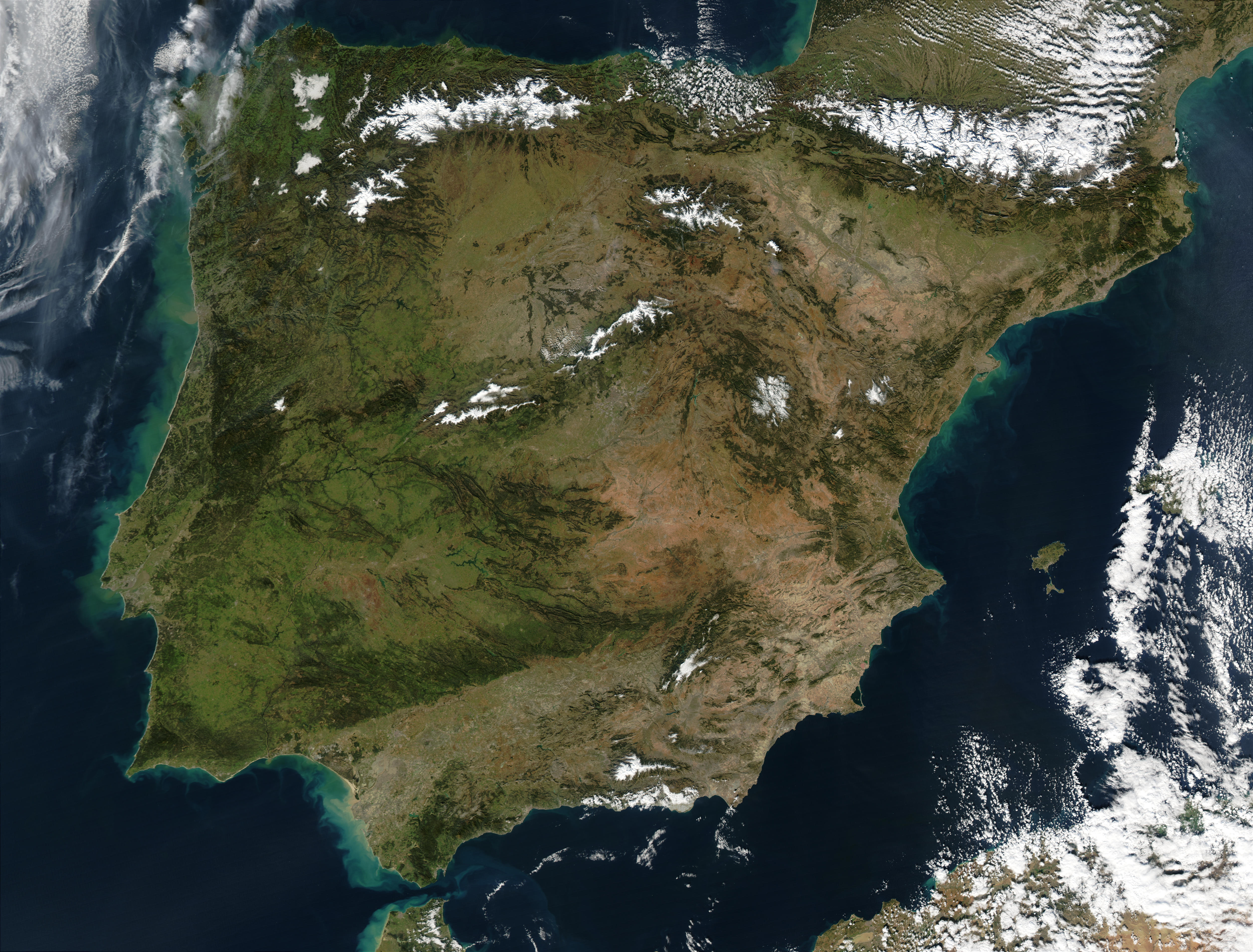
The Iberian Peninsula consists mostly of Spain, Portugal and Andorra which heavily inspired the design for the Paldea Region.

Pokémon Scarlet and Violet are set in the Paldea Region of the Pokémon universe, which appears to be loosely based on the Iberian Peninsula. The region features diverse landscapes including lakes, wastelands, and mountain ranges. A large crater, called the Great Crater of Paldea, lies in the center of the region. Inside the Crater is an area named Area Zero.

=== Story ===
In Scarlet and Violet, the player attends either the Naranja (Scarlet) or Uva (Violet) Academy, which has an annual "Treasure Hunt" that encourages students to seek something they treasure by exploring the region. After encountering either the Legendary Pokémon Koraidon or Miraidon, who joins and assists the player despite having lost its ability to battle, they are encouraged to participate in three stories: Victory Road, Starfall Street, and Path of Legends.

In Victory Road, Nemona—a Champion-ranked Trainer that rivals the player and frequently battles them throughout their journey—asks that they complete the Paldea region's eight Gyms. After defeating the leaders of each Gym, they can reach Champion rank by defeating the region's Elite Four and Top Champion, Geeta. After becoming Champion rank, Nemona challenges the player to a final battle, which the player wins.

In Path of Legends, Arven asks for the player's help in locating the five legendary Herba Mystica. To obtain each Herba Mystica, the player and Arven team up to defeat "Titan Pokémon"—abnormally large Pokémon powered up by the Herba Mystica. Throughout the story, Arven reveals that he wishes to use the Herba Mystica to heal his pet Mabosstiff, who was badly injured by a Pokémon in Area Zero—the workplace of his parent, either Professor Sada (Scarlet) or Turo (Violet). After defeating all five Titans, he and the player use the Herba Mystica to heal Mabosstiff and regain Koraidon/Miraidon's lost powers. He then challenges the player to a final battle, before being called by the professor to go to Area Zero with either the Scarlet or Violet Book. Arven decides that they must recruit further allies before journeying into Area Zero.

In Starfall Street, the player helps shy schoolgirl Penny stand up against Team Star, a group responsible for academy bullying. Cassiopeia—Team Star's founder and Penny's secret identity—enlists them for "Operation Starfall", which aims to force Team Star to disband by defeating its five squad bosses. They are assisted by academy director Clavell, who aims to discover Team Star's origins while disguised as a student named Clive, and Penny, who wants to monitor the player in-person and guide them as Cassiopeia. They learn that Team Star was founded to counter bullying rather than cause it, and their confrontation with their bullies eighteen months ago caused the bullies to drop out and several academy staff members to resign. After defeating all squad bosses, Penny meets the player in the schoolyard to reveal her identity and challenge them to a battle. After her defeat, Clavell reveals his disguise and offers peace with Team Star, though he subjects its members to community service as punishment for several violations.

After choosing Nemona and Penny for assistance, Arven and the player set out towards the Zero Lab, the professor's laboratory in Area Zero. This unlocks the final story, The Way Home. Inside, they encounter Paradox Pokémon—biological relatives of extant Pokémon from either the ancient past (Scarlet) or far future (Violet). Koraidon and Miraidon are revealed to be Paradox Pokemon, being relatives of Cyclizar, and were ousted from Area Zero after losing a territory struggle with a second, more aggressive Koraidon/Miraidon. After reaching the laboratory, the professor reveals themselves to be an AI substitute of the true professor, who was killed in a laboratory incident sometime prior to the events of the games. The AI reveals that the original professor created a time machine to retrieve Paradox Pokémon and that they are to maintain it at all costs. The AI urges the player to shut down the time machine to preserve Paldea's ecology, though its programming forces it to battle them. After initially being defeated, the time machine's security protocols disable Poké Balls in the area not registered under Sada/Turo's ID, leaving the player with no option except for their Koraidon or Miraidon to defeat the AI's own. This causes the time machine to fail, and the AI travels to an alternate time to allow for the machine's destruction, apologizing to Arven for the original professor neglecting him as a child before departing.

In the post-game upon returning to the academy, Nemona, Clavell, and Geeta organize a Pokémon battling tournament between faculty and students. After evaluating all previous Gyms, the player emerges victorious in the tournament.

== Development ==
Concept artwork depicting an early version of Scarlet and Violet, illustrating the new artstyle Game Freak wished to incorporate into the games

Pokémon Scarlet and Violet started development in late 2019, around the time that Pokémon Sword and Shield released. During development, developers Game Freak wished to incorporate a "real and deformed" look into the games, including more realistic textures and more stylized character designs. According to Keiichi Maezawa, a member of Game Freak, at a conference discussing this approach, this was intended to ground the games in a more realistic environment and make the games closer to the real world. To further express realism with the games, natural sound was incorporated into the games' overworld. Though this had been a feature in prior games, the developers wished to increase the expressiveness of these sounds and create a large sample of sounds that could be used for later games in the series. They created a program called "PokeSynth" to accomplish this goal, which could be used to make a wide variety of sounds using a Pokémon species' in-game cry. Members of the development team also went into the forest and used speakers to evaluate the realism of how the sounds of Pokémon would appear in-game. They also went to zoos to study how different species of animal changed their vocalizations under a variety of conditions, and defined Pokémon into different groups to determine what sounds each species would make.

Pokémon models received a significant overhaul in these games, with new models being constructed for the games. Game Freak initially created blueprints, and sent setting material and motion instructions to the model team, who then create a model from the materials sent to them. Following a model's creation, meetings would be held to determine other aspects of the model. Individual actions such as facial expressions and emotions in the animations are then handled by other members of the staff. Models for Pokémon species had alterations to shading and appearance done in order to convey different personalities, with many unique textures applied to the models. These textures were substituted for a unique crystalline effect to convey a Pokémon's Terastallized state. The team additionally used specific lighting and angles to convey this desired approach with the playable character. Once actions and traits of a Pokémon are finalized, test models are made. Once approved, movements for a given species are finalized. Joint movements of the species were often altered throughout development, with many being altered at the request of animation artists. Animations are completed using an in-house program.

Species re-used animations from prior games where possible despite having new models and rigs. This caused complications during development, as the team had to find the most cost-effective way of being able to re-use animations. Every species used rigged and modeled facial features unlike prior games, which had used textures to convey facial features. The team paid careful attention to making each model in order to ensure they conveyed each species' core personalities while fitting in with the games' artistic style. Pokémon incorporating motifs from real-world objects and animals often incorporated elements from these motifs in their animations, with the animations team doing research to figure out what source would work best for a species. Species resembling inanimate objects were designed with the thought process of attempting to make them resemble living creatures. New lighting schemes were introduced to help embellish the species, and many Pokémon were altered during development to have their idle animations be clearly visible and interesting while using the series's traditional battling view, which has the camera behind the player's Pokémon. The developers wished to ensure the Pokémon appeared visually interesting and consistent across multiple in-game camera angles as well.

=== Music ===
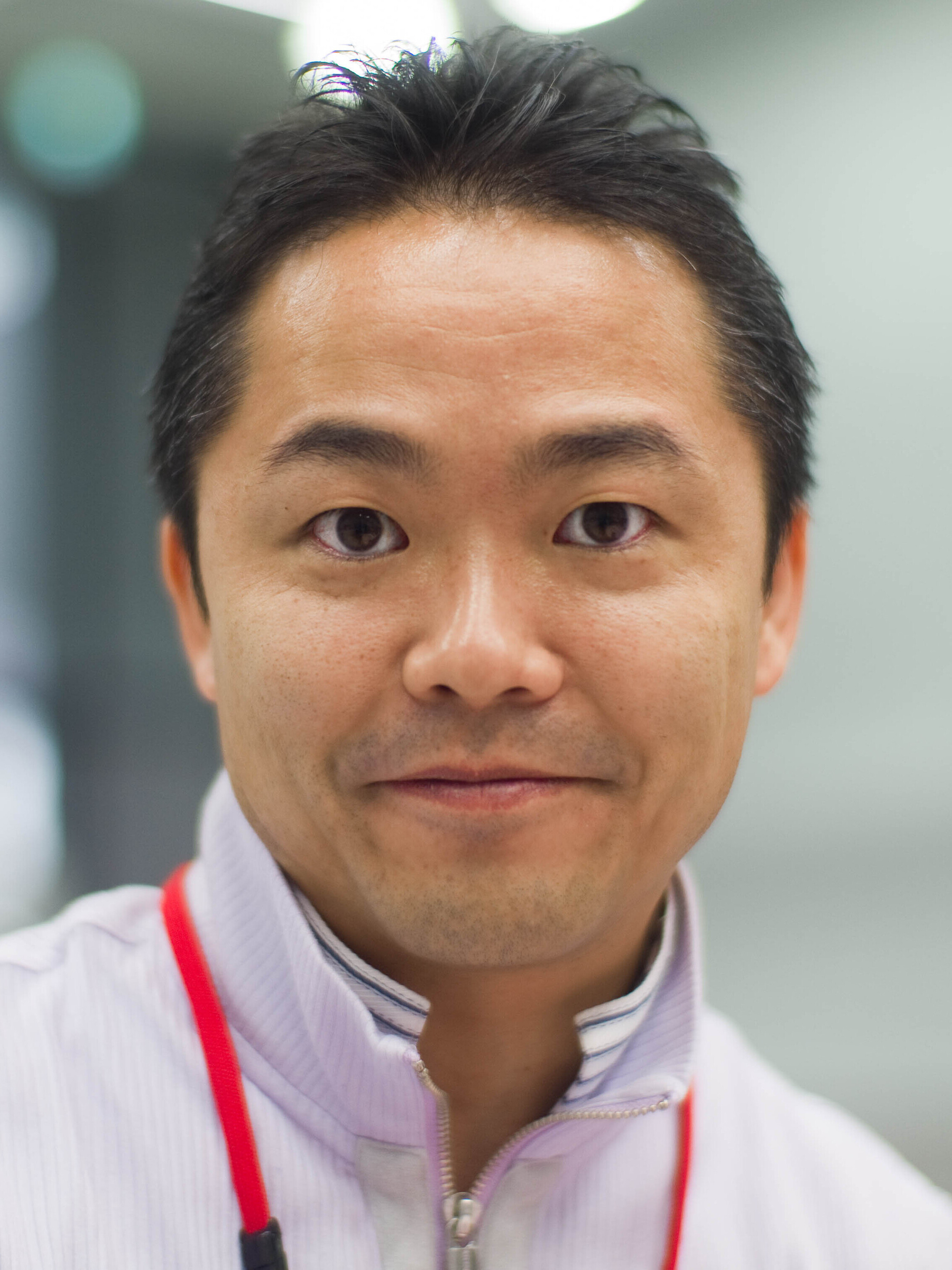
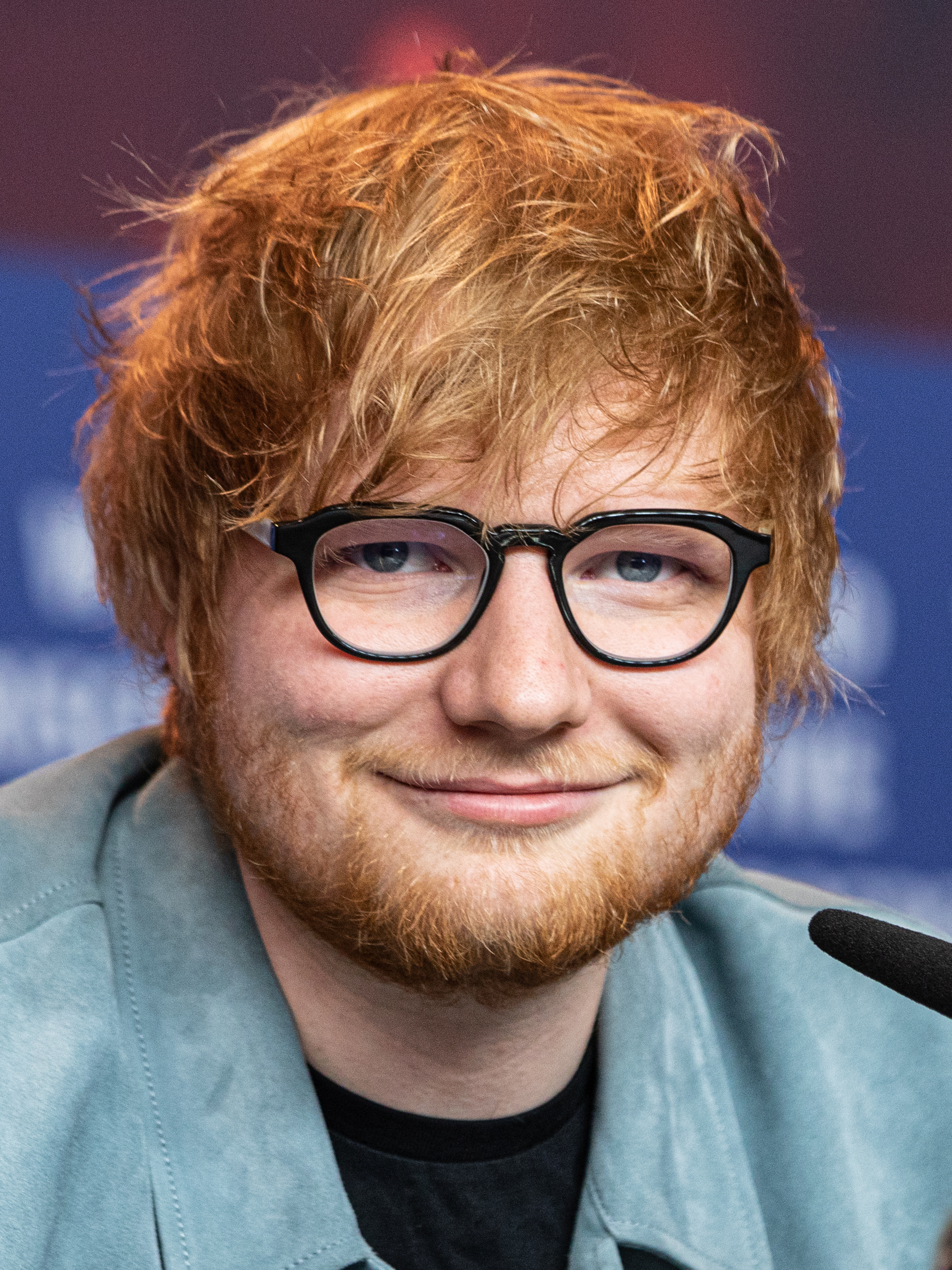
Composers for the game include Junichi Masuda (left), Toby Fox (center), and guest composer Ed Sheeran (right)

The games' soundtrack was handled by a variety of composers. Teruo Taniguchi, who had previously worked on Pokémon Black 2 and White 2, composed the music associated with Team Star in the games. Longtime series composer Go Ichinose handled music related to the Path of Legends story path, as well as a track used for battling the group of Pokémon known as the Ruinous Quartet. The Victory Road path's music was composed by Junichi Masuda, with other tracks for the route being composed by Minako Adachi and Hitomi Sato. Pokémon Scarlet and Violet's soundtrack was officially released in February 2024. The game's soundtrack was also made available on Nintendo Music, and made available as part of the software's launch lineup in October 2024. Additional music was produced by Toby Fox, known from Undertale.

English singer-songwriter Ed Sheeran collaborated with the games for the song "Celestial". Sheeran has been a fan of the series since childhood, and he had previously collaborated with spin-off game Pokémon Go for an event in 2021. "Celestial" is the first music track in the series to feature lyrics. "Celestial's" music video was released on September 29, 2022, and was directed by Yuichi Kodama. It depicts Sheeran interacting with a variety of sketch-style Pokémon, including a Snorlax that saves Sheeran from a car accident and a Lapras that takes him across a river. The appearances of the Pokémon were drawn by art director Yu Nagaba. According to an NME article, Nagaba emulated the way Sheeran drew Pokémon when he was younger for the video. "Celestial" appears in the games as well, playing in the end credits for Scarlet and Violet. "Celestial" was later remixed by Fox for the end credits of the Scarlet and Violet's DLC expansions. Unlike other songs in the games, "Celestial" is not included in the official soundtrack release for Scarlet and Violet.

== Marketing and release ==
Pokémon Scarlet and Violet were announced as part of a Pokémon Presents presentation on February 27, 2022, through a partially live-action trailer, which revealed the 3 starters; Sprigatito, Fuecoco, and Quaxly. On June 1, 2022, a second trailer was released, officially revealing Koraidon and Miraidon, more gameplay footage, the Pokémon Smoliv, Lechonk, and Pawmi, and the characters of Nemona, Sada, and Turo. On August 3, 2022, a third trailer was released alongside an overview trailer during a Pokémon Presents. These trailers revealed two new Pokémon, the name of the region, Terastallization, and other details. A fourth trailer, released on September 7, 2022, detailed the three routes the player can play through in the games as well as three new Pokémon. Characters such as Mela, Brassius, and Geeta were also officially revealed.

During the closing ceremony of the 2022 Pokémon World Championships on August 21, 2022, a new trailer was released that showcased a new Pokémon, Cyclizar, as well as new items and abilities to be used in competitive play. On September 29, 2022, singer Ed Sheeran released a song titled "Celestial" in collaboration with The Pokémon Company that appeared in Pokémon Scarlet and Violet. Ed Sheeran's song would later be used in the game credits. On October 6, 2022, a 14-minute trailer was released, highlighting the unique gameplay between four different players, each going on a different "path" in the story, as well as Farigiraf, Girafarig's evolution. Throughout the games' pre-release marketing, several in-universe videos were published by The Pokémon Company, such as a camera trap to reveal Grafaiai, a web seminar to reveal Wiglett, a livestream to reveal Bellibolt, and a short found footage trailer to reveal Greavard. On November 4, 2022, a special edition Nintendo Switch OLED model with themed artwork was released. On November 11, 2022, a week before the games were released, a Splatfest themed around the three starter types was held in Splatoon 3.

Prior to the release of the games, several leaks related to in-game content occurred. Leaks began as early as July, where low quality images of several unrevealed characters and Pokémon were leaked prior to their official reveals. The Pokémon Gimmighoul was leaked prior to its official reveal in early November via a datamine of the spin-off game Pokémon Go, following the Pokémon having accidentally been shown in a pre-release trailer. 72 Pokémon that appear in the game were leaked a few days prior to the games' release, which spread rapidly over social media platforms such as Instagram and TikTok. ROMs of the games were leaked on the forum 4chan, and players livestreamed the games in the days leading up to the games' release. Parent company Nintendo attempted to takedown many of these leaks, but other accounts reposted the information after it was taken down.

Pokémon Scarlet and Violet were released worldwide on November 18, 2022. The games were released with numerous graphical and technical errors, including several bugs and glitches which impacted player performance. On December 1, 2022, Nintendo apologized for the issues players encountered and announced the 1.1.0 update, which fixed some bugs. Update 1.2.0, released in February 2023, fixed a number of further bugs, but also introduced a rare bug which corrupted save files. Update 1.3.0, released on April 19, 2023, fixed further bugs.

Pokémon Scarlet and Violet are one of the games for Nintendo Switch that have a free upgrade for the Nintendo Switch 2. On June 2, 2025, the Nintendo Today! app showcased gameplay footage of the Switch 2 upgrade, revealing improved image quality and a frame rate of 60 FPS.

=== Downloadable content ===
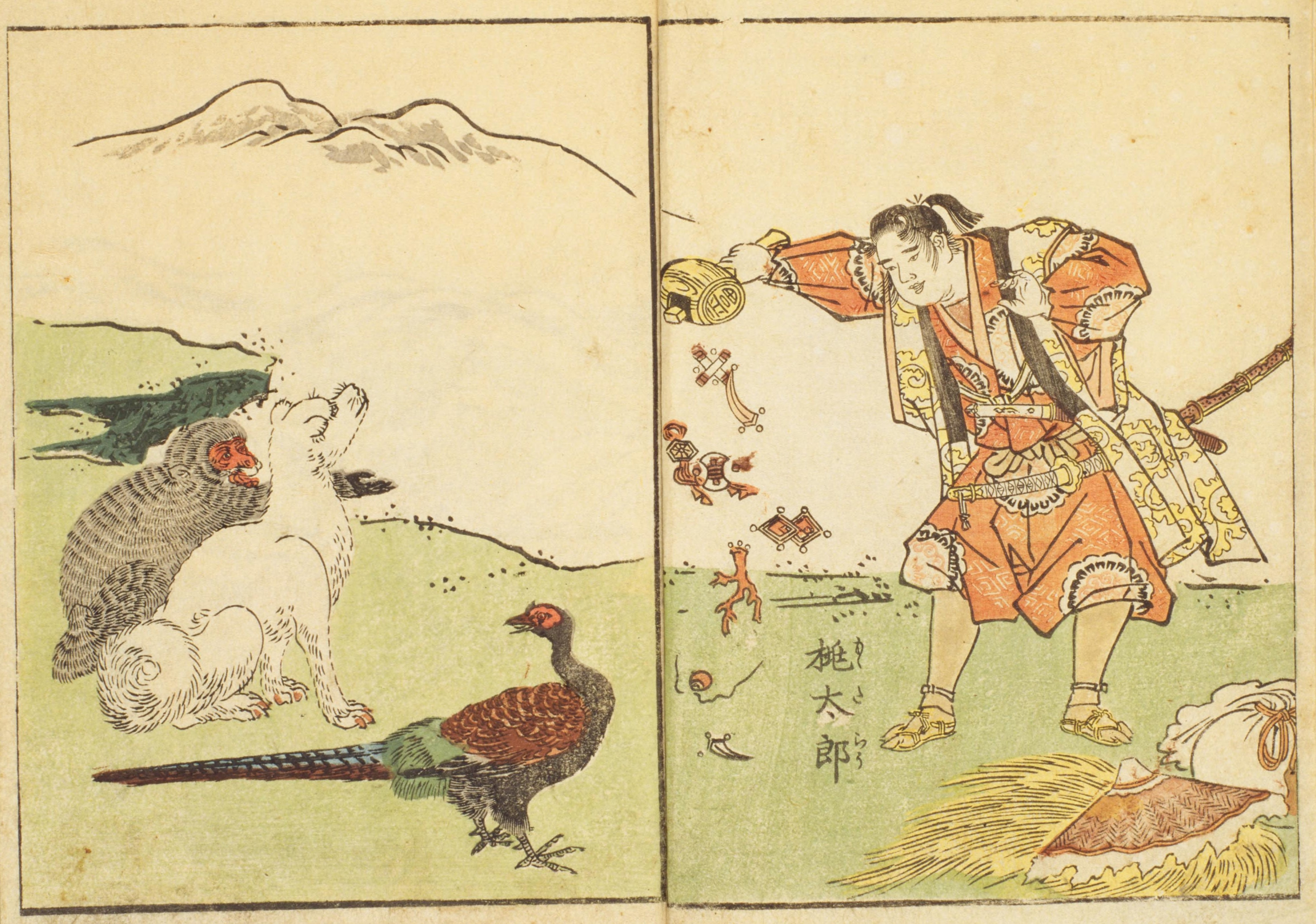
The Teal Mask, one of the game's DLC expansions, is based on the Japanese myth of Momotarō.

On February 27, 2023, the Pokémon Day presentation featured an announcement trailer for the downloadable expansion pack, The Hidden Treasure of Area Zero, which contained two DLC expansions: The Teal Mask and The Indigo Disk. The first part, The Teal Mask, focusing on the Legendary Pokémon Ogerpon, was released on September 13, 2023, and the second, The Indigo Disk, focusing on the Legendary Pokémon Terapagos, was released on December 14, 2023. The downloadable content introduced over 230 returning Pokémon that did not appear in the base game, including new Pokémon like Poltchageist and new evolutions for Applin and Duraludon.

In The Teal Mask, based on the legend of Momotarō, the player embarks on a school trip organized by the academy to the land of Kitakami, which would also coincide with a festival in the village, while uncovering the truth behind a local legend. In The Indigo Disk, the player studies at their Academy's sister school, Blueberry Academy, as an exchange student, eventually traveling back to Area Zero to conclude the plot. On January 11, 2024, the DLC's epilogue Mochi Mayhem released where the player goes back to the land of Kitakami to catch a new Mythical Pokémon, Pecharunt.

=== Tie-ins ===
Following their release, Pokémon Scarlet and Violet were made compatible with Pokémon Home, a cloud-based storage system that allows players to store Pokémon from the games in Home and additionally send Pokémon from past games in the series into Scarlet and Violet. Pokémon Scarlet and Violet were also made compatible with Pokémon Go in 2023, allowing players to send postcards from Go to Scarlet and Violet. This allows players in Go to encounter a special form of Gimmighoul, while players in Scarlet and Violet can encounter special forms of the Pokémon Vivillon. Special tie-in promotional videos, depicting characters from both games discussing Gimmighoul and its lore, were released prior to the official reveal of the compatibility announcement.

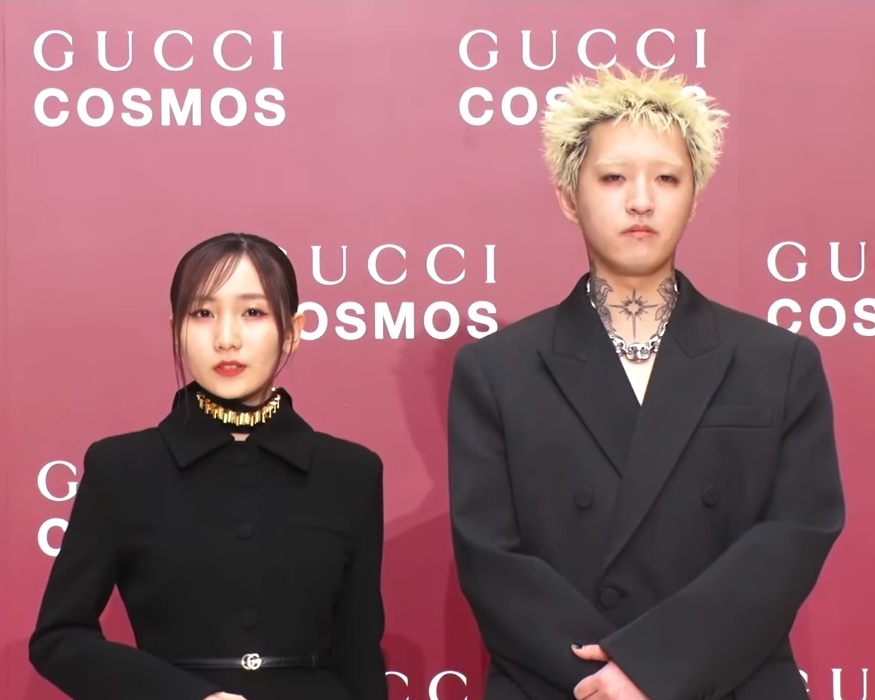
Yoasobi created the song "Biri-Biri" to celebrate the first anniversary of the games' release.

The anime series Pokémon Horizons: The Series featured several tie-ins to Pokémon Scarlet and Violet. Several locations, characters, and species from the games make appearances in the series. In August 2023, during a Pokémon Presents presentation, a limited 4-episode web series based on the games, subtitled Pokémon: Paldean Winds, was announced; it premiered on YouTube on September 6, 2023, and ended on December 13, 2023. Produced by Wit Studio, it is based on the Paldea region as a tie-in to Scarlet and Violet, although it is not part of the main anime series. Each episode focuses on a different student at the Academy, with each overcoming a problem over the course of the episode.

On November 16, 2023, pop duo Yoasobi and The Pokémon Company announced a collaboration to celebrate the games' first anniversary with a song, titled "Biri-Biri". Biri-Biri was released in both Japanese- and English-language versions simultaneously on November 18, 2023. A music video was released on the same day. The story of the video primarily focuses on Nemona and a transfer student named Anna, who go on a quest involving finding their "treasure". "Biri-Biri" was inspired by the game-based short story Kimi to Ameagari o (きみと雨上がりを; lit. 'After the Rain with You'), which was written by novelist Ayano Takeda. The song was later performed live by Yoasobi at various locations.

== Reception ==
=== Critical response ===
Reception

Aggregate scores
Aggregator	Score
Metacritic	72/100 (Scarlet); 71/100 (Violet)
OpenCritic	48% recommend

Review scores
Publication	Score
4Players	6.0/10
Destructoid	6/10
Digital Trends	3.5/5
Famitsu	38/40
Game Informer	8.25/10
GameRevolution	6/10
GameSpot	8/10
GamesRadar+	3/5
Hardcore Gamer	4/5
IGN	6/10
Nintendo Life	7/10
Nintendo World Report	6.5/10
NME	3/5
Shacknews	7/10
The Telegraph	3/5
The Guardian	3/5
Video Games Chronicle	4/5
VG247	4/5
GamePro (DE)	75/100

Scarlet and Violet received "mixed or average reviews" according to review aggregator website Metacritic, making them the lowest-rated mainline series Pokémon games. Fellow review aggregator OpenCritic assessed that the games received fair approval, being recommended by 48% of critics.

GameSpot writer Jake Dekker regarded the non-linearity of the games as their "strength", while Nintendo Life described the experience as capturing the "real magic" of the first Pokémon games, Red and Blue. The latter also praised the story as "wholesome" and offering "genuinely tender moments". Writing for IGN, Rebekah Valentine found the new open world gameplay style enjoyable, highlighting other new gameplay mechanics such as Tera Raids and new online mechanics. She criticized various elements of the games, in particular finding the games' lack of polish and depth in various aspects such as its online features and exploration in its open world to be lackluster and low quality. Regarding the open-world design Joel Franey writing for GamesRadar+ criticized the games' "aimlessness" and "notable lack of stakes" without any end goal. He praised other elements of the games, such as their music and general user-interface improvements. Kenneth Shepard, writing for Polygon, praised several aspects of the games, including the Terastallization feature's ability to improve upon strategy in battles, as well as the game's writing. He criticized the games for what he perceived as being a step back from their predecessor Pokémon Legends: Arceus, citing the removal of many quality of life features introduced in that game. He additionally believed the games did not adequately tell the player in what order they were meant to approach its major story beats from, which he felt would leave them confused.

The Guardian's Tom Regan found the games to be a fun take on the usual series formula, but criticized the games' technical and graphical problems, believing that they held back the games' potential. Jason Faulkner, writing for GameRevolution, criticized the games' textures, model collision, performance, and furthermore criticized the games' progression as being "awkward and semi-linear despite the open-world design". Lea Irion, writing about the games on 4Players, felt that the games showed that the Pokémon franchise was becoming less ambitious year after year, while also being unfinished and carelessly thrown together. She called the games disappointingly average as a result. Willem Hilhorst, writing in a retrospective for Nintendo World Report, criticized the games. While he felt as though the various glitches in the games could be excused due to the franchise's reputation with glitches such as MissingNo., he felt the removal of many long-standing series features alongside a lack of polish made the games "jam the gears" of those trying to enjoy them. He praised elements of the games and its story, but overall found the games to be off-putting to both casual and returning players alike.

Publications criticized the games for suffering from graphical glitches and poor performance. The graphics were also considered to be lackluster, with unfavorable comparisons to other Nintendo Switch titles such as Xenoblade Chronicles 3. The Washington Post's Jhaan Ekler described how fans and critics alike were unhappy with the graphics, stating that it still had not improved upon the franchise's notoriety for lackluster graphical design. Eurogamer's Oliver Mackenzie found the games to be of low quality graphically, citing them as downgrades from their predecessor, Pokémon Legends: Arceus, and as being "comprehensive technical failures" in comparison to other games available on the Nintendo Switch. IGN writer Rebekah Valentine added that the games' innovative design was undermined by the numerous graphical and technical issues within the games. Due to the performance issues, some players began requesting refunds of the games soon after launch, which Nintendo granted in most cases. As a result of criticism toward the games' quality on release, The Pokémon Company COO, Takato Utsunomiya, stated that the company would be having internal discussions about the series's release schedule going forward.

=== Sales ===
According to The Pokémon Company, Scarlet and Violet are the most pre-ordered titles in the series' history. Within three days of its release, the games had sold over 10 million copies worldwide, including 4.05 million in Japan alone. The sales figure was the highest of any software on any Nintendo platform within three days, and the best launch of any console-exclusive game in history. The games were the best-selling video game titles of 2022 in Japan. By June 2025, the game had sold 27.15 million copies, making it the second most sold Pokémon title and the sixth-best selling title on the Switch. As of 2026, the games have sold 8.66 million copies in Japan, making them the second best-selling Pokémon titles in Japan behind Red and Green.
