= Dottie Potter Zenaty =

American field hockey coach

Dottie Potter Zenaty was the field hockey coach at Springfield College from 1970 to 2003, amassing a record of 377 wins, 233 losses and 43 ties in 34 seasons.

Zenaty was inducted into the New Agenda Northeast Hall of Fame in 1989, the Springfield College Athletic Hall of Fame in 1990 and the National Field Hockey Coaches Association Hall of Fame in 2003.

She was named the New England Women's and Men's Athletic Conference Field Hockey Coach of the Year in 1999 and 2000.
