= Pokémon Horizons: The Series =

1st season of Pokémon Horizons and 26th season of the Pokémon animated series

- Season 26 (overall); Season 1 (Horizons)
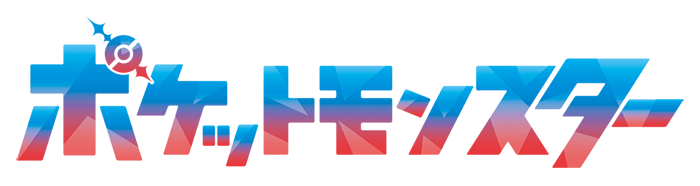
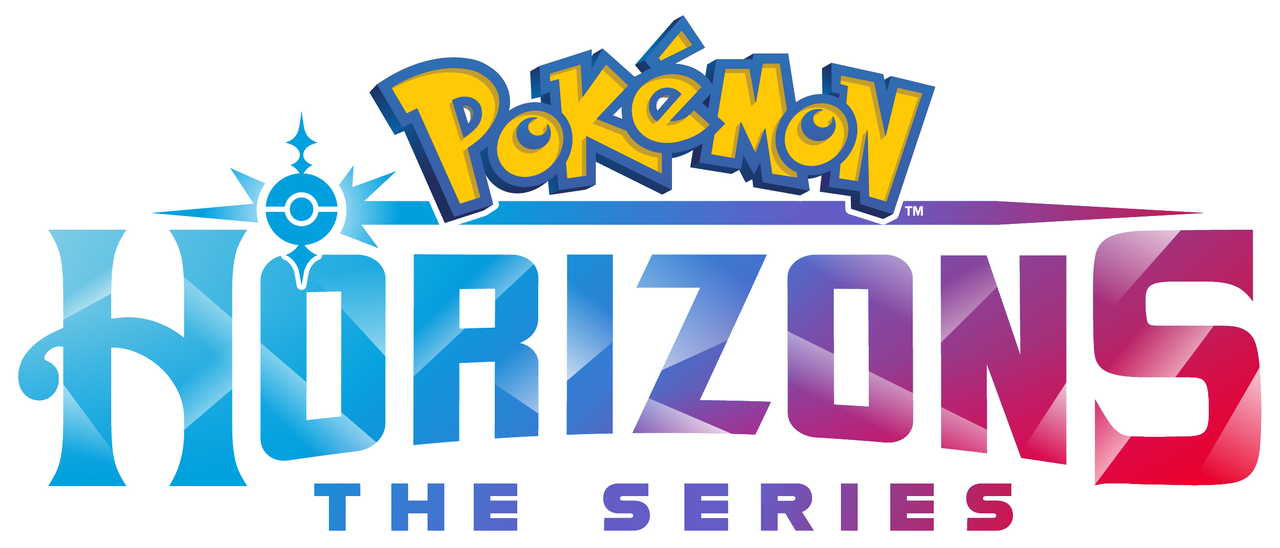
- Japanese logo for Pocket Monsters (2023) (top); English logo for Pokémon Horizons: The Series (bottom)
- No. of episodes: 45

Release
- Original network: TV Tokyo
- Original release: April 14, 2023 – March 29, 2024

Season chronology
- ← Previous; Ultimate Journeys Next → Horizons – The Search for Laqua

Pokémon Horizons: The Series, known in Japan as Pocket Monsters: Liko and Roy's Departure (Note: Japanese: ポケットモンスター リコとロイの旅立ち, Hepburn: Poketto Monsutā: Riko to Roi no Tabidachi) and Pocket Monsters: The Sparkling of Terapagos, (Note: Japanese: ポケットモンスター テラパゴスのかがやき, Hepburn: Poketto Monsutā: Terapagosu no Kagayaki) is the twenty-sixth season of the Pokémon anime series and the first season of Pokémon Horizons: The Series, known in Japan as Pocket Monsters (ポケットモンスター, Poketto Monsutā). Directed by Saori Den and produced by OLM, the season aired in Japan on TV Tokyo from April 14, 2023, to March 29, 2024, and was later distributed in the United States by Netflix from March 7 to November 22, 2024. Daiki Tomiyasu served as executive director, with Saori Den as director, Dai Satō as script supervisor, Rei Yamazaki as character designer, Conisch as music composer, and Naotsugu Uchida and Akane Yamago as sound editors, replacing Ryōko Nashimoto. Bessatsu CoroCoro Comic and Gakushu Yochien are no longer credited as publishers, and Junichi Masuda and Ken Sugimori are no longer credited as creators.

The season comprises two story arcs. The first arc, "Liko and Roy's Departure", covering the first 25 episodes, follows protagonists Liko and Roy as they embark on adventures with the Rising Volt Tacklers, exploring the Pokémon world, including the Paldea region introduced in Pokémon Scarlet and Violet. The second arc, "The Sparkling of Terapagos", covering the final 20 episodes, follows the Rising Volt Tacklers as they search for Lucius's Six Heroes, after discovering that Liko's pendant is a Terapagos. Throughout both arcs, they are pursued by a mysterious organization called the Explorers.

== Episode list ==
Jpn. overall	Eng. overall	No. in season	English title Japanese title	Directed by	Written by	Animation directed by	Original release date	English release date
1235	1224	1	"The Pendant That Starts It All: Part One (The Pendant of Beginning, Part 1)"; Transliteration: "Hajimari no Pendanto Zenpen" (Japanese: はじまりのペンダント 前編)	Directed by : Saori Den; Storyboarded by : Saori Den & Tetsuo Yajima	Dai Satō	Yuki Masutani, Toshiko Nakaya, Natsumi Hattori & Izumi Shimura	April 14, 2023	December 1, 2023 (UK); March 7, 2024 (US)
Liko, a shy girl from the Paldea region, arrives in the Kanto region to begin her studies at Indigo Academy, a boarding school. Eventually, she chooses Sprigatito as her Starter Pokémon, but they struggle to get along. One night, Liko encounters a man named Amethio, who hands her a letter supposedly from her grandmother requesting that she bring her pendant. Feeling suspicious about the situation, Liko instead decides to flee. While Amethio and his henchmen Zirc and Onia pursue her, a man with a Charizard rescues her. When Liko attempts to jump off a rooftop, her pendant suddenly begins to glow.
1236	1225	2	"The Pendant That Starts It All: Part Two (The Pendant of Beginning, Part 2)"; Transliteration: "Hajimari no Pendanto Kōhen" (Japanese: はじまりのペンダント 後編)	Directed by : Makoto Oga & Ayumi Moriyama; Storyboarded by : Daiki Tomiyasu	Dai Satō	Toshihito Hirooka, Chiaki Kurakazu, Masaya Onishi, Miho Sugimoto & Sayo Sugiyama	April 14, 2023	December 1, 2023 (UK); March 7, 2024 (US)
Liko is encased in a green sphere and sees a strange Pokémon, which soon disappears. Friede, the man with the Charizard, takes Liko to safety aboard the airship called the 'Brave Olivine'. Liko meets Friede's companions and begins to trust them. Meanwhile, Amethio, Zirc and Onia (known as The Explorers) continue their pursuit of Liko's pendant and arrive on the airship. After a battle between Friede and Amethio, Amethio's team decides to retreat, taking Sprigatito with them.
1237	1226	3	"For Sure! 'Cause Sprigatito's with Me! (As Long as I'm With Nyahoja, I'm Sure)"; Transliteration: "Nyaoha to Nara, Kitto" (Japanese: ニャオハとなら、きっと)	Directed by : Junya Koshiba; Storyboarded by : Tetsuo Yajima	Naruki Nagakawa	Yoshitaka Yanagihara, Yūsuke Oshida & Makoto Shinjō	April 21, 2023	December 1, 2023 (UK); March 7, 2024 (US)
The day after Sprigatito's disappearance, Friede tracks the Explorers to a nearby port town, and the crew agrees to help Liko rescue Sprigatito. At the Pokémon Center, Murdock's Rockruff sniffs out Onia, who has been taking care of the captive Sprigatito. As the crew pursues them, Amethio orders Onia to lure them to their hideout. There, Friede stalls Amethio in a battle to allow Liko to rescue Sprigatito. After Onia confronts her outside, Liko orders Sprigatito to use Leafage so they can escape. Friede and the Rising Volt Tacklers retreat with Liko and set sail for her home in Paldea. Meanwhile, local islander Roy finds the Brave Olivine's missing flag on the beach.
1238	1227	4	"The Treasure After the Storm! (A Washed-Ashore Treasure)"; Transliteration: "Nagaretsuita Takaramono" (Japanese: ながれついた宝もの)	Yūji Asada	Dai Satō	Masaaki Iwane & Izumi Shimura	April 28, 2023	December 1, 2023 (UK); March 7, 2024 (US)
The Rising Volt Tacklers dock at Roy's island to repair the damaged Brave Olivine's balloon. Their Fuecoco stumbles overboard and wanders through the island's forest, eating a stash of berries it finds before Roy discovers and befriends it. After noticing Fuecoco's absence, Liko and Sprigatito track it to the forest, where wild Pokémon attack them, because they blamed them for eating the berries. As Roy aids them, his ancient Poké Ball resonates with Liko's pendant, but the wild Pokémon soon trap the group and Fuecoco. Friede rescues the group and calms the wild Pokémon, which forgive Fuecoco after Liko and Roy help it replace the berries. Liko, Sprigatito and Fuecoco part ways with Roy and return to the Brave Olivine.
1239	1228	5	"Found You, Fuecoco! (I Found You, Hogator)"; Transliteration: "Mitsuketa yo, Hogēta" (Japanese: みつけたよ、ホゲータ)	Directed by : Fumihiro Ueno; Storyboarded by : Hiromasa Amano	Muga Takeda	Takashi Shinohara	May 5, 2023	December 1, 2023 (UK); March 7, 2024 (US)
Unwilling to leave Fuecoco, Roy stows aboard the Brave Olivine to become its partner. The crew allows Roy to stay for the night, but he is unable to find Fuecoco and returns home the next morning. Fuecoco learns of Roy's visit and goes looking for him, discovering along the way that the Explorers have followed the Rising Volt Tacklers. After reuniting with Fuecoco and being warned about the Explorers, Roy enlists the local bug Pokémon to repair the Brave Olivine's balloon while Friede and the crew battle Amethio and Zirc to protect the ship. Roy joins the battle and motivates Fuecoco to perform its first successful Ember attack, but this distracts Friede and allows Amethio to move in on Liko.
1240	1229	6	"The Ancient Poké Ball (The Ancient Monster Ball)"; Transliteration: "Inishie no Monsutā Bōru" (Japanese: いにしえのモンスターボール)	Yasuhiro Noda	Kureha Matsuzawa	Akihiko Oka, Izumi Shimura, Hiromi Niioka, Toshiya Yamada & Toshiko Nakaya	May 12, 2023	December 1, 2023 (UK); March 7, 2024 (US)
After Liko's pendant once again protects her, she and Roy battle Amethio, but his Ceruledge overpowers Sprigatito and Fuecoco. As Liko rushes to protect Sprigatito, Roy's Poké Ball resonates with her pendant and unleashes a black Rayquaza that forces the Explorers to retreat before it flies away. Inspired by his adventure, Roy catches Fuecoco and gains his grandfather's permission to travel with the Rising Volt Tacklers in order to catch Rayquaza. Meanwhile, the Explorers' leader, Gibeon, removes Amethio from his mission in favor of his teammate Spinel, leaving Amethio to pursue Rayquaza and its connection to the pendant.
1241	1230	7	"Special Training with Cap! (Special Training! Captain Pikachu)"; Transliteration: "Tokkun! Kyaputen Pikachū" (Japanese: 特訓！キャプテンピカチュウ)	Directed by : Hiromichi Matano; Storyboarded by : Noriaki Saitō	Kureha Matsuzawa	Makoto Shinjō & Yuki Masutani	May 19, 2023	January 15, 2024 (UK); March 7, 2024 (US)
Liko and Roy ask Dot, the crew's reclusive information gatherer, about Rayquaza's whereabouts, but she rebuffs them with a drawing of a defeated Roy and Fuecoco. Friede agrees to train Liko and Roy in Pokémon battling, pitting them against his partner, Captain "Cap" Pikachu. When their usual strategy of blindly ordering attacks fails, the two improve by focusing on Cap's movements, although Sprigatito and Fuecoco lose interest in the match and fall asleep. Liko and Roy apply their newfound knowledge in battle against each other, which ends with Sprigatito learning Quick Attack and subsequently defeating Fuecoco. Dot responds to their match with a drawing of Rayquaza flying over Paldea, indicating that it is there.
1242	1231	8	"The Door That Never Opens (The Secret of the Unopened Door)"; Transliteration: "Akazu no Tobira no Himitsu" (Japanese: あかずの扉のひみつ)	Directed by : Yoshihiko Iwata; Storyboarded by : Naruki Nagakawa	Hiromasa Amano	Masaya Ōnishi, Chiaki Kurakazu & Hiromi Sakai	May 26, 2023	January 15, 2024 (UK); March 7, 2024 (US)
After Friede and Murdock fail to coax Dot out of her room with doughnuts, the crew stops at a nearby town for supplies. Liko remains aboard the Brave Olivine to watch a livestream hosted by Nidothing, a costumed content creator. Believing Dot to be a fan, Liko invites Dot to watch together, unaware that Dot and Nidothing are the same person. Dot angrily dismisses Liko's invitation at first, but after Liko expresses her appreciation for Nidothing, and later comments on Nidothing's stream asking how to befriend Dot, Dot is inspired to briefly leave her room and accept Murdock's doughnuts that night.
1243	1232	9	"Welcome to Paldea! (Arrival in Paldea!)"; Transliteration: "Parudea Tōchaku!" (Japanese: パルデア到着！)	Yūji Asada	Dai Satō	Masaaki Iwane & Izumi Shimura	June 2, 2023	January 15, 2024 (UK); March 7, 2024 (US)
The Brave Olivine arrives in Paldea, reminding Liko that her travels with the Rising Volt Tacklers will only be temporary. Liko is indecisive about staying with the crew or her parents, causing Sprigatito to avoid her as she seemingly starts to settle back into her old home. After overhearing her father, Alex, express his concerns for her since her departure to Kanto, Liko shares her feelings with the crew and decides to continue her adventures with them, reconciling with Sprigatito and gaining Alex's approval. While discussing the black Rayquaza with Friede, Alex recalls that artist Brassius witnessed a rare Pokémon in Artazon.
1244	1233	10	"Nemona and Brassius and... (With Nemo and Colza)"; Transliteration: "Nemo to Corusa to" (Japanese: ネモとコルサと)	Makoto Nakata	Muga Takeda	Yoshitaka Yanagihara, Yusuke Oshida & Toshiko Nakaya	June 9, 2023	January 15, 2024 (UK); March 7, 2024 (US)
Liko and Roy arrive in Artazon and meet Champion-ranked Trainer Nemona, who is concerned that Brassius has been recently neglecting his duties as the town's Gym Leader. They learn that Brassius is suffering from an artistic slump that began when he saw the black Rayquaza after making a sculpture of one, causing him to consider his artwork inferior. However, Roy is deeply moved by the sculpture, motivating Brassius to test his resolve with a battle. Although Fuecoco learns Stomping Tantrum to gain an advantage, it loses to Brassius's Terastalized Sudowoodo. Satisfied, Brassius shows the trio a sculpture he carved of an Arboliva in the forest where he saw Rayquaza, noting its resonance with the legendary Pokémon.
1245	1234	11	"Arboliva's Forest (Oliva's Forest)"; Transliteration: "Orīva no Mori" (Japanese: オリーヴァの森)	Directed by : Fumihiro Ueno; Storyboarded by : Satoshi Shimizu	Naruki Nagakawa	Takashi Shinohara	June 16, 2023	January 15, 2024 (UK); March 7, 2024 (US)
Nemona guides Liko and Roy to the forest Brassius mentioned, with Mollie accompanying them after learning it has been recently devastated by a wildfire. While investigating, Liko encounters a Paldean Wooper that has been dehydrated by the fire. The local Pokémon take Wooper to a giant tree adorned with an ancient Poké Ball identical to Rayquaza's. The "tree" turns out to be the oversized Arboliva, who misunderstands their intentions and attacks Liko's party as Mollie tends to Wooper. Liko and Roy distract Arboliva long enough for Mollie to treat Wooper, calming Arboliva, who shows them the greater extent of the wildfire's damage to the forest.
1246	1235	12	"The Future I Choose"; Transliteration: "Watashi ga Erabu Mirai" (Japanese: わたしが選ぶ未来)	Directed by : Junya Koshiba; Storyboarded by : Hiromasa Amano	Kureha Matsuzawa	Izumi Shimura, Masaya Ōnishi, Shinichi Yoshino, Toshiko Nakaya & Kurika Yamagata	June 23, 2023	January 15, 2024 (UK); March 7, 2024 (US)
Liko's group works to help regrow the damaged forest. After Friede discovers and fends off a Magneton interfering with the crew's communications, they recruit Ludlow to irrigate the soil with his Quagsire, allowing Arboliva to fully restore the greenery. Arboliva and the Pokémon within Liko's pendant show Liko and Roy a vision of a mysterious Pokémon before Arboliva returns to its Poké Ball. Friede meets with Liko's mother, Lucca, who explains that Rayquaza and Arboliva are two of the Six Heroes, Pokémon who traveled with the legendary adventurer Lucius. Liko and Roy come to the same conclusion after reading a storybook Alex wrote about the legend, determining Lucius to be the figure from the vision. Liko resolves to find her grandmother, who gave her the pendant, while Roy decides to find Lucius' other four Pokémon. Following a lead from Lucca's Squawkabilly, the Rising Volt Tacklers head to an old castle in Galar, unaware that the Magneton's trainer, Spinel, is following them.
1247	1236	13	"An Unexpected Picnic! (A Sudden Picnic)"; Transliteration: "Picnic wa Totsuzen ni" (Japanese: ピクニックは突然に)	Directed by : Masashi Tsukino; Storyboarded by : Noriaki Saito	Kureha Matsuzawa	Hironori Hano & Cheom Hyang Go	July 14, 2023	January 15, 2024 (UK); May 10, 2024 (US)
The Rising Volt Tacklers have a picnic near Levincia while waiting for the Brave Olivine's computer systems to reboot. Wanting to share the experience with Dot and Ludlow as they tend to the ship, Liko prepares an indoor picnic spread for them with help from Murdock. Dot thanks Liko with a picture of herself in-costume as Nidothing, intending to reveal her identity to her. Liko believes Dot is only pretending to be Nidothing due to an earlier misunderstanding, but is happy to have bonded with her. Meanwhile, a wild Wattrel steals and eats one of Roy and Fuecoco's sandwiches, despite their offer to share it. Concerned with Wattrel's distance from its flock, Roy decides to spend more time with it. When Friede returns to the ship, its systems shut down as a result of Spinel sabotaging it.
1248	1237	14	"Fly! Wattrel!! (Fly! Kaiden!!)"; Transliteration: "Tobe! Kaiden!!" (Japanese: とべ！カイデン！！)	Directed by : Oh Jin Koo; Storyboarded by : Hiromasa Amano	Muga Takeda	Chiaki Kurakazu, Natsumi Hattori & Keita Hagiwara	July 21, 2023	January 15, 2024 (UK); May 10, 2024 (US)
Roy learns that Wattrel has a fear of heights that prevents it from flying, and spends the day training with it to help it overcome its fear. He succeeds after using Ludlow's fishing rod as a harness for Wattrel, allowing it to rejoin its flock; however, it decides to stay with Roy and he catches it. Meanwhile, Friede chases Spinel's Magneton away to prevent it from interfering with the Brave Olivine's system reboot. After battling Friede remotely to study his moves, including his Charizard's ability to Terastalize into a Dark-type, Spinel lures Liko and Sprigatito to Levincia and has his Beheeyem put them in a trance, erasing Liko's memory of her pendant as he steals it.
1249	1238	15	"Someone We Can't See! Whosawhatsit? (It's Someone You Can't See! Whosawhatsit?)"; Transliteration: "Mienai Yatsu da! Nanimon nanja?" (Japanese: みえないヤツだ！何者(ナニモン)なんじゃ？)	Yūji Asada	Kureha Matsuzawa	Masaaki Iwane & Izumi Shimura	July 28, 2023	January 15, 2024 (UK); May 10, 2024 (US)
As a result of Beheeyem's hypnosis, Liko and Sprigatito forget their experiences since their first meeting, leaving them to wander through Levincia. Determined to find Liko when she fails to return, Dot contacts fellow streamer and local Gym Leader Iono to organize a public search for Liko as a game of hide-and-seek. Liko takes the game seriously and flees her pursuers with Sprigatito, with both regaining their memories in the process. Roy and Dot find Liko, who notices her missing pendant. After recognizing Beheeyem as one of Spinel's Pokémon, the Rising Volt Tacklers begin organizing a plan to retrieve the pendant.
1250	1239	16	"Quaxly, We Can Do It (As Long As I'm With Kuwassu, I Can Do It)"; Transliteration: "Kuwassu to Nara, Dekiru yo" (Japanese: クワッスとなら、できるよ)	Hiroaki Takagi	Naruki Nagakawa	Yoshitaka Yanagihara & Yusuke Oshida	August 4, 2023	January 15, 2024 (UK); May 10, 2024 (US)
Dot catches Quaxly as the Rising Volt Tacklers begin their counterattack against Spinel. As Friede is lured away by a hired decoy, Liko, Roy, and Dot realize the pendant is nearby when Arboliva's Poké Ball suddenly resonates with it. Dot searches a cargo ship that Spinel boarded, using Quaxly's Water Gun as a beacon to bring Liko and Roy to her aid when Spinel's Pokémon corner her. The trio work together to defeat Spinel's Beheeyem and Magneton, but his Umbreon overpowers them. In response, the pendant emits a light that exposes Spinel's location, allowing Liko to recover the pendant while Arboliva helps the trio escape. After they return to the Brave Olivine, Dot confesses her identity as Nidothing to Liko.
1251	1240	17	"Special Training Time! (Kaiden and Hogator: Secret Training!)"; Transliteration: "Kaiden to Hogēta: Himitsu no Dai Tokkun!" (Japanese: カイデンとホゲータ 秘密の大特訓！)	Directed by : Hiromichi Matano; Storyboarded by : Satoshi Shimizu	Michihiro Tsuchiya	Makoto Shinjō & Yuki Masutani	August 11, 2023	February 27, 2024 (UK); May 10, 2024 (US)
Roy trains Fuecoco and Wattrel in battle to stop them from arguing. After losing a match against Cap, Roy gains new inspiration when the Brave Olivine experiences turbulent winds that strengthen Wattrel's Spark attack. Using Dot's advice, Roy develops a new strategy where he throws Fuecoco and Wattrel into the air to give Wattrel more elevation. The three use their strategy in a rematch against Cap, which results in Wattrel catching Cap off guard and knocking off its hat. Although Roy loses again, he finds his training has united Fuecoco and Wattrel through their shared determination to defeat Cap.
1252	1241	18	"Flying Pikachu, Rising Higher and Higher! (Flying Pikachu, Soaring High!)"; Transliteration: "Soratobu Pikachū, Doko Made mo Takaku!" (Japanese: そらとぶピカチュウ、どこまでも高く！)	Directed by : Makoto Nakata; Storyboarded by : Daiki Tomiyasu	Kureha Matsuzawa	Masaya Ōnishi, Yasue Ōno & Yusuke Oshida	August 18, 2023	February 27, 2024 (UK); May 10, 2024 (US)
Intrigued by Cap's apparent ability to fly during his battle with Roy, Liko, Roy, and Dot persuade Friede to reveal the origins of his Pikachu. When he was younger, he became aimless after quitting his unfulfilling lab job as a Pokémon researcher. His passion was rekindled when Lucca, his former schoolteacher, introduced him to a wild Pikachu, who used its tail and Volt Tackle attack to become airborne. Through his efforts to befriend Pikachu, Friede discovered it sought to fly to watch the morning horizon, inspiring him to travel the world and learn more about unusual Pokémon like Pikachu. Friede recruited his childhood friend Orla to build the Brave Olivine out of his acquaintance Ludlow's seaboat, and dubbed Pikachu as the ship's captain, leading to the formation of the Rising Volt Tacklers.
1253	1242	19	"The Bittersweet Truth (The Truth About Mawhip)"; Transliteration: "Mahoippu no Honto" (Japanese: マホイップのホント)	Directed by : Fumihiro Ueno; Storyboarded by : Hiromasa Amano	Deko Akao	Takashi Shinohara	August 25, 2023	February 27, 2024 (UK); May 10, 2024 (US)
The Rising Volt Tacklers arrive at Motostoke in the Galar region to begin their search for Liko's grandmother. Liko, Roy, and Murdock stop at a Battle Café run by Murdock's former friend and business partner, Mitchell, who refuses to battle him. Murdock reveals to Liko and Roy that his and Mitchell's friendship ended over their Milcery's evolution into a Ruby Mix Alcremie, which better suited Murdock's pastries than Mitchell's. Wanting to rekindle their friendship, Liko persuades Mitchell to have a double battle against her and Murdock, which becomes a baking competition between the two chefs, allowing them to reconcile. Following the match, the group meets the Motostoke's Gym Leader, Kabu, whom Roy believes has information on Rayquaza.
1254	1243	20	"Kabu's Battle Training! (Kabu's Battle Training)"; Transliteration: "Kabu-san no Batoru Shugyō" (Japanese: カブさんのバトル修行)	Directed by : Ayumi Moriyama; Storyboarded by : Noriaki Saitō	Michihiro Tsuchiya	Chiaki Kurakazu, Natsumi Hattori & Keita Hagiwara	September 1, 2023	February 27, 2024 (UK); May 10, 2024 (US)
After Liko and Roy question him about the black Rayquaza, Kabu decides to test their resolve with a training session at his Gym. The two are challenged to light and blow out Litwick candles, which Liko narrowly loses when she stops to admire Roy and Fuecoco's growth. They then face Kabu and his apprentice Wakaba in a two-on-one match, during which Fuecoco learns Flamethrower before losing to Kabu's Centiskorch. Faced with a solo match against Wakaba, who is being tested to become an official Gym Trainer, Liko upsets her by forfeiting so she can pass, but makes up with her after Kabu lectures Liko for allowing herself to hesitate for others' sake. Afterwards, Kabu reveals that he saw Rayquaza flying towards the Galar Mine.
1255	1244	21	"The Lonely Hatenna (The Lonely Mibrim)"; Transliteration: "Hitori Botchi no Miburimu" (Japanese: ひとりぼっちのミブリム)	Directed by : Masashi Tsukino; Storyboarded by : Noriaki Saitō	Naruki Nagakawa	Hironori Hano	September 8, 2023	March 27, 2024 (AUS); May 10, 2024 (US)
Liko, Roy, and Friede are caught in a rainstorm while searching for the Galar Mine. They seek shelter in a cabin, where they find an unwell Hatenna, whose empathic powers have caused it to feel anguished by others' emotions. Liko brings Hatenna aboard the Brave Olivine to treat it, but it hides to avoid the Rising Volt Tacklers' emotions. Liko coaxes Hatenna out of hiding by relating to its anxiety, which calms it down. After the storm clears, Liko attempts to return Hatenna to its habitat, but Sprigatito convinces it to stay with Liko, who catches Hatenna and devotes herself to studying the feelings of Pokémon.
1256	1245	22	"Charge! Galar Mine! (Clash! Galar Mine)"; Transliteration: "Gekitotsu! Gararu Kōzan" (Japanese: 激突！ガラルこうざん)	Makoto Ōga	Muga Takeda	Yoshitaka Yanagihara & Yusuke Oshida	September 15, 2023	March 28, 2024 (AUS); May 10, 2024 (US)
Liko, Roy, and Friede arrive at the Galar Mine and begin searching for Rayquaza. Liko and Roy quickly become separated from Friede, and travel deeper into the mine as they follow noises that Roy assumes to be Rayquaza's cries. After Liko and Roy find and aid a camp of fatigued miners, the two groups re-encounter Amethio's team, who are also investigating Rayquaza. Liko and Roy's battle with Zirc and Onia is interrupted by the true source of the noise and the miners' fatigue: a Galarian Moltres holding one of Lucius' ancient Poké Balls. Moltres defeats Cap while Cap protects Liko and Roy, who overcome Moltres' stamina-draining aura to escape the mine with Cap while Friede keeps Amethio occupied to cover their escape.
1257	1246	23	"Fiery Galarian Moltres (Burning Galar Fire)"; Transliteration: "Moeagaru Gararu Faiyā" (Japanese: 燃え上がるガラルファイヤー)	Yūji Asada	Kureha Matsuzawa	Masaki Iwane & Izumi Shimura	September 22, 2023	March 29, 2024 (AUS); May 10, 2024 (US)
After Friede safely escapes the mine, the group devises a plan to quell Moltres' anger using Sprigatito's soothing aroma. Moltres' attacks prevent the group from approaching it, but Arboliva uses its Grassy Terrain to strengthen Sprigatito, allowing the group to create an aromatic whirlwind that calms Moltres. The pendant transforms into the mysterious Pokémon and shows the group a vision of Lucius mentioning something called "Laqua" before Moltres returns to its Poké Ball, entrusting itself to the group. Noticing the pendant Pokémon has not returned to its pendant form, the group smuggles it out of the mine while Amethio observes them and vows to capture the Pokémon.
1258	1247	24	"Reunion at the Ancient Castle (Reunion at the Old Castle)"; Transliteration: "Kojō de no Saikai" (Japanese: 古城での再会)	Directed by : Hiromichi Matano; Storyboarded by : Hiromasa Amano	Dai Satō	Makoto Shinjō & Yuki Masutani	October 13, 2023	May 2, 2024 (AUS); August 9, 2024 (US)
Liko, Roy, and Friede arrive in Hammerlocke, where a Squawkabilly guides them to the ancient castle where Liko's grandmother, Diana, lives. Diana recognizes the pendant Pokémon as Terapagos, which she discovered in a dormant state as a child and gave to Liko for safekeeping after her former friend Hamber, a high-ranking member of the Explorers, approached her. She also reveals that Terapagos traveled with Lucius in search of the legendary paradise Laqua. As Diana leaves to retrieve Lucius' memoirs, Amethio's team attacks the group after tracking their location, but Terapagos confronts him.
1259	1248	25	"Rivals in the Dark of Night (Rivals in the Dark Night)"; Transliteration: "Yamiyo no Raibaru" (Japanese: 闇夜の強敵(ライバル))	Hiroaki Takagi	Dai Satō	Keita Hagiwara, Chiaki Kurakazu, Natsumi Hattori, Toshiko Nakaya, Masaya Ōnishi, Yusuke Oshida, Koki Yanagihara, Hiromi Niioka & Saki Ebisawa	October 20, 2023	May 3, 2024 (AUS); August 9, 2024 (US)
Liko and her friends flee with Terapagos as Diana returns to cover their escape from Amethio's team. Amethio follows Liko's group to one of the castle towers, where Friede uses himself as a decoy against Amethio and defeats him. Zirc and Onia corner Liko and Roy while Hamber confronts Diana as she gathers Lucius' memoirs. Suddenly, the Explorers Coral and Sidian make an unauthorized attack on the castle, allowing Diana to escape. After receiving an emergency call from Friede, the Rising Volt Tacklers arrive and rescue Liko and Roy from Coral and Sidian. Diana decides to accompany the Rising Volt Tacklers, giving Lucius' memoirs to Liko and encouraging them to assemble the Six Heroes.
1260	1249	26	"Terapagos's Adventure"; Transliteration: "Terapagosu no Bōken" (Japanese: テラパゴスの冒険)	Directed by : Satoshi Saga; Storyboarded by : Noriaki Saitō	Kureha Matsuzawa	Ryōtarō Aoba, Kōsuke Hiramatsu & Naoko Yamamoto	October 27, 2023	May 27, 2024 (UK); August 9, 2024 (US)
Terapagos wanders the Brave Olivine to explore its new surroundings, leading Liko to intently follow it around, much to Sprigatito's displeasure. Liko eventually finds Terapagos calling out to someone from the bow of the ship, and nearly falls overboard trying to save it, but Diana rescues them after being alerted by Sprigatito. Realizing that Terapagos is searching for Lucius, Liko decides to bring it to Laqua, which Diane believes is possible by restoring Terapagos' original power through the Six Heroes. Sprigatito and the Rising Volt Tacklers agree to help Liko find the rest of the Six Heroes, with Dot revealing multiple sightings of the black Rayquaza across Galar.
1261	1250	27	"As Long as I'm With My Friends"; Transliteration: "Nakama to Issho nara" (Japanese: 仲間といっしょなら)	Directed by : Fumihiro Ueno; Storyboarded by : Hiromasa Amano	Naruki Nagakawa	Takashi Shinohara	November 3, 2023	May 27, 2024 (UK); August 9, 2024 (US)
Dot's intel on Rayquaza leads the Rising Volt Tacklers to meet an eyewitness at Galar's Wild Area, but they discover the intel to be false, frustrating Dot. To cheer her up, Liko invites Dot to make curry with them after they run into an ingredients seller. Dot hesitantly agrees, having never eaten curry before, and comes to enjoy the experience, thanking Liko. Afterwards, the group decides to investigate an antique shop for info on the ancient Poké Balls. Meanwhile, the Explorers convene to discuss Terapagos and the Six Heroes. After Amethio posits that Arboliva and Moltres were awakened by Rayquaza, the Explorers decide to prioritize Rayquaza's capture.
1262	1251	28	"The Stolen Treasure"; Transliteration: "Nusumareta Takaramono" (Japanese: ぬすまれた宝もの)	Yūji Asada	Michihiro Tsuchiya	Masaaki Iwane	November 10, 2023	May 27, 2024 (UK); August 9, 2024 (US)
Liko, Roy, and Friede bring Rayquaza's Poké Ball to be inspected by Diana's old friend and adventuring companion, an antique salesman named Tepen, who covertly steals the ball to sell it to another client. Upon noticing the theft, Liko's group pursues Tepen through the town, suspecting he is working for the Explorers. They eventually corner Tepen at a park, where he knocks out Liko and Roy's Pokémon with sleeping powder, but has his entire team defeated by Cap. Diana confronts Tepen, rebuking him for resorting to fraud and thievery, and reminding him of his old passion for adventure. Remorseful, Tepen apologizes to everyone and directs them to his client, who is revealed to be a Poké Ball craftsman.
1263	1252	29	"Orla and the Poké Ball Smith (Orio and the Monster Ball Craftsman)"; Transliteration: "Orio to Monsutā Bōru Shokunin" (Japanese: オリオとモンスターボール職人)	Directed by : Yoshihiko Iwata; Storyboarded by : Noriaki Saitō	Naohiro Fukushima	Yoshitaka Yanagihara, Masaya Ōnishi & Hiromi Sakai	November 17, 2023	May 27, 2024 (UK); August 9, 2024 (US)
Liko's group meets the Poké Ball craftsman, Karna, who owns a factory that mass produces experimental Poké Balls. Orla accompanies the group, noticing Karna's neglect towards her factory's condition and providing vital maintenance. Impressed with Orla's expertise, Karna offers her a full-time position at the factory. Liko worries that Orla will accept due to the constant repair requests their crewmates make, but Orla assures Liko that working aboard the Brave Olivine fulfills her, since building the ship for Friede inspired her to try new things. After inventively helping save the factory from a swarm of Galarian Weezing provoked by Roy, Orla declines Karna's offer and returns with her friends.
1264	1253	30	"Slip and Crash! A Mystery Pokémon?! (The Slipping, Smashing Mystery Pokémon!?)"; Transliteration: "Zurūtto Gachan de Nazo Pokemon!?" (Japanese: ズル～っとガチャンで謎ポケモン！？)	Ayumi Moriyama	Deko Akao	Chiaki Kurakazu, Megumi Matsumoto, Keita Hagiwara, Masaya Ōnishi, Yoshitaka Yanagihara, Yusuke Oshida & Kenji Katō	November 24, 2023	May 27, 2024 (UK); August 9, 2024 (US)
A wild Polteageist stows aboard the Brave Olivine, leaving behind puddles of purple liquid found by the crew. While Liko and Roy investigate the source of the liquid, Polteageist makes itself known to the ship's other Pokémon when it challenges their Shuckle out of jealousy over its berry juice. Liko and Roy eventually find the ship's Pokémon hosting a private match between Polteageist and Shuckle to welcome Polteageist aboard the Brave Olivine, and decide not to intrude. The next morning, Friede nonchalantly accepts Polteageist, while Diana is delighted to find Polteageist has turned her teacup into a Sinistea, revealing they had already known about Polteageist's presence and let Liko and Roy discover it by themselves.
1265	1254	31	"Song Within the Mist (The Singing Voice in the White Mist)"; Transliteration: "Shiroi Kiri no Utagoe" (Japanese: 白い霧の歌声)	Directed by : Hiromichi Matano; Storyboarded by : Shōji Nishida	Kureha Matsuzawa	Makoto Shinjō & Yuki Masutani	December 1, 2023	May 27, 2024 (UK); August 9, 2024 (US)
The Rising Volt Tacklers search the ocean for the next of the Six Heroes, a Lapras, after several reports of one that guides sailors out of mist-covered waters with its singing. When Lapras appears to aid them after the Brave Olivine enters the mist, Liko and Roy find part of their food cargo being stolen by an Ambipom and Toedscruel, two woodland Pokémon, which vanish without a trace after jumping overboard. Suspicious, Friede leads the crew back into the mist with more cargo as bait, exposing a group of thieving Pokémon riding on a Wailord's back. In the process, Lapras is revealed to have created the mist to deceive sailors as the thieves' leader.
1266	1255	32	"Lapras's Feelings for its Friends (Laplace's Memories of Its Companions)"; Transliteration: "Rapurasu no Omoi, Nakama o Omoi" (Japanese: ラプラスの想い、仲間を想い)	Directed by : Hiroyuki Okuno; Storyboarded by : Hiromasa Amano	Kureha Matsuzawa	Ryōtarō Aoba, Kōsuke Hiramatsu & Naoko Yamamoto	December 8, 2023	May 27, 2024 (UK); August 9, 2024 (US)
The Rising Volt Tacklers chase after Lapras and its band of "pirate" Pokémon to reason with them, but Lapras freezes the Brave Olivine to the water with its Ice Beam to protect its companions. Noticing a trail of empty food crates from other sailors the Pokémon have robbed, Liko and her friends are able to find Lapras' hideout, where they convince Lapras of their intentions. With the support of Terapagos and Lucius' other Pokémon, Lapras shows Liko's group its memory of Lucius claiming he will still be alive and waiting for his Pokémon in Laqua. After Liko promises to help find Lucius, the other pirate Pokémon unveil Lapras' ancient Poké Ball and persuade Lapras to join Liko while they continue to fend for themselves. Following this, Liko's group sees the black Rayquaza flying overhead.
1267	1256	33	"Roar of the Black Rayquaza (The Roaring Black Rayquaza)"; Transliteration: "Hōkō no Kuroi Rekkūza" (Japanese: 咆吼の黒いレックウザ)	Makoto Nakata	Dai Satō	Yusuke Oshida, Natsumi Hattori & Toshiko Nakaya	December 15, 2023	July 22, 2024 (UK); August 9, 2024 (US)
Roy challenges Rayquaza to a battle, but Amethio arrives to capture Rayquaza for himself. Rayquaza easily defeats Amethio's Ceruledge and attacks the Rising Volt Tacklers, but Terapagos briefly enters its Terastal Form and protects them before Rayquaza flies away, with Friede and Diana concluding that Rayquaza was testing Terapagos' power. Diana prepares to investigate the Six Heroes and Explorers on her own, asking Friede to keep her departure a secret from Liko. The next day, Diana battles Liko and Roy, restoring their confidence following their disheartening encounter with Rayquaza. Meanwhile, Amethio returns the Explorers' base with the resolve to become stronger.
1268	1257	34	"Respective Departures"; Transliteration: "Sorezore no Tabidachi" (Japanese: それぞれの旅立ち)	Directed by : Yoshiko Iwata; Storyboarded by : Tetsuo Yajima	Naruki Nagakawa	Yoshitaka Yanagihara, Natsumi Hattori & Masaya Ōnishi	December 22, 2023	July 22, 2024 (UK); August 9, 2024 (US)
Liko and Roy overhear Diana's decision to leave at the next port, so the Rising Volt Tacklers surprise her with a farewell party where they celebrate their experiences throughout Diana's stay. Diana is touched by the gesture and gives her journal to Liko before the group drops her off. Meanwhile, Amethio undergoes a grueling training battle with Hamber, who defeats Amethio's Ceruledge with his Terastal Dusknoir. Hamber is impressed with Amethio's commitment to defeating Rayquaza, and gives him a Terastal Orb with which to continue his training. Eavesdropping on Amethio and Hamber, Spinel and fellow Explorer Chalce plan to claim Rayquaza themselves.
1269	1258	35	"The Wild Pair, Friede and Cap! (A Duo in the Wilderness: Friede and Cap)"; Transliteration: "Kōya no Futari: Furīdo to Kyappu" (Japanese: 荒野のふたり フリードとキャップ)	Yūji Asada	Michihiro Tsuchiya	Masaaki Iwane & Izumi Shimura	January 12, 2024	July 22, 2024 (UK); November 22, 2024 (US)
The Rising Volt Tacklers take on odd jobs after running out of travel funds, with Friede accepting a job to find an old friend's missing Bramblin in the wilderness. Liko joins Friede to write a school report on his bond with Cap, but is confused and disappointed by the duo's arguing as they follow Bramblin across the desert. When Bramblin is captured by Pokemon hunters, Friede and Cap appear to separate after another argument, but it is revealed to be a ploy to distract the hunters long enough for Bramblin to evolve into Brambleghast so it can break free, thwarting the hunters and regaining Liko's respect.
1270	1259	36	"Mission: Find Oinkologne's Partner! (Operation Perfuton Friendship!)"; Transliteration: "Pafuyūton Nakayoshi Dai Sakusen!" (Japanese: パフュートン仲良し大作戦！)	Directed by : Fumihiro Ueno; Storyboarded by : Hiromasa Amano	Naohiro Fukushima	Takashi Shinohara	January 19, 2024	July 22, 2024 (UK); November 22, 2024 (US)
A girl from Pigton Town named Yuno asks Nidothing for help finding a partner for her depressed Oinkologne in an upcoming tag battle tournament. Nidothing sends Liko and Roy to assist, learning that the female Twirly is enamored with Prince, a male Oinkologne belonging to Yuno's rival and secret crush, Renta. Prince continually rebuffs Twirly despite Liko and Roy's efforts, preferring the company of female Pokémon attracted to his sweet scent. Quaxly retaliates by dancing to steal the attention of Prince's admirers, spurring a jealous Prince to cover Quaxly in dirt. Twirly attacks Prince to defend Quaxly, earning Prince's admiration. Yuno and Renta begrudgingly accept each other as partners for their Pokémons' sake and, after training with Liko and Roy, eventually win the tournament together.
1271	1260	37	"Fuecoco... Becomes a Crook?! (Hogator, You're Becoming a Delinquent?!)"; Transliteration: "Hogēta, Waru ni Naru!?" (Japanese: ホゲータ、ワルになる！？)	Directed by : Yasuhiro Noda; Storyboarded by : Noriaki Saitō	Kimiko Ueno	Chiaki Kurakazu, Keita Hagiwara & Megumi Matsumoto	January 26, 2024	July 22, 2024 (UK); November 22, 2024 (US)
The Rising Volt Tacklers are hired to remove a large rock at an excavation site, but are forced to wait when a savage Krookodile and its pack of Krokorok damage the digging equipment. Investigating the site with Liko and Friede, Roy and Fuecoco find the mother Krookodile's nest of baby Sandile. After Roy and Fuecoco befriend the pack with their singing, the group realizes that Krookodile's family is simply defending their nest from the excavators. The pack becomes agitated when the excavation resumes, provoking them into attacking the excavators again. With the pack threatened with extermination, Fuecoco learns Disarming Voice from the Krokorok's Round attack to calm them down. At Roy's suggestion, the pack use their Round to destroy the rock, although the Rising Volt Tacklers lose their payment with their help no longer required.
1272	1261	38	"The SOS is from Tandemaus? (SOS from Wakkanezumi?)"; Transliteration: "Esu Ō Esu wa Wakkanezumi kara?" (Japanese: SOSはワッカネズミから？)	Directed by : Hiromichi Matano; Storyboarded by : Masato Satō	Deko Akao	Makoto Shinjō & Yuki Masutani	February 2, 2024	July 22, 2024 (UK); November 22, 2024 (US)
While giving their Pokémon a medical checkup after a storm, Liko and Mollie find what appears to be a solitary Tandemaus, a Pokémon that normally comes in pairs. The Tandemaus brings them to a tunnel blocked off by a fallen tree, where they quickly retrieve its companion. When the Tandemaus continues to cry out for others deeper in the tunnel, Liko follows it along with Hatenna and finds two smaller counterparts to Tandemaus, revealing the group to be the Pokémon's evolved form, a Maushold family of four. Hatenna learns Heal Pulse to heal the injured Maushold, which remain aboard the Brave Olivine thereafter.
1273	1262	39	"Tinkatink's Ideal Hammer (Kanuchan and Its Special Hammer)"; Transliteration: "Kanuchan to Kodawari no Hanmā" (Japanese: カヌチャンとこだわりのハンマー)	Directed by : Yūichi Abe; Storyboarded by : Tetsuo Yajima	Naohiro Fukushima	Yusuke Oshida & Toshiko Nakaya	February 9, 2024	July 22, 2024 (UK); November 22, 2024 (US)
Dot goes shopping for microphones in Steelbound Town after her streaming equipment is damaged in an explosion. One of her new microphones is taken by a wild Tinkatink, which remodels it into a hammer for itself. Later, when the Rising Volt Tacklers' iron supply goes missing, most of the crew blame Tinkatink for stealing it when Tinkatink comes to show its new hammer to Dot, but Dot defends Tinkatink. Realizing the missing iron was eaten, Friede discovers the true culprit to be an intruding Orthworm, which swallows Tinkatink's hammer. After Dot helps Tinkatink recover the hammer, Tinkatink decides to stay with Dot, who catches Tinkatink.
1274	1263	40	"Farewell, Sprigatito? (Farewell, Nyahoja?)"; Transliteration: "Sayonara, Nyaoha?" (Japanese: さよなら、ニャオハ？)	Directed by : Hiroyuki Okuno; Storyboarded by : Hiromasa Amano	Michihiro Tsuchiya	Ryōtarō Aoba, Kōsuke Hiramatsu & Pei Qi Peng	February 16, 2024	July 22, 2024 (UK); November 22, 2024 (US)
During a training battle with Roy, Sprigatito accidentally hits Liko with its Leafage and causes her to sprain her wrist. Wracked with guilt, Sprigatito returns to its nearby breeding shelter run by Marnya, the interviewer who selected Liko as its trainer, and avoids Liko when she comes to retrieve it. Liko learns from Marnya that Sprigatito was shunned by its Pokemon friends after similarly injuring them while trying to save them from a Spidops. Liko reassures Sprigatito that she will never abandon it after their experiences together, causing Sprigatito's Leafage to change into a Magical Leaf attack when it fends off Spidops for threatening Liko's other Pokémon.
1275	1264	41	"A Wild Mom Appears! (Enter the Intense Mom!)"; Transliteration: "Kyōretsu Kā-chan Arawaru!" (Japanese: キョーレツかーちゃん現る！)	Yūji Asada	Deko Akao	Masaaki Iwane & Izumi Shimura	March 1, 2024	September 9, 2024 (UK); November 22, 2024 (US)
Dot's overbearing mother, Franka, visits the Brave Olivine to bring her daughter home, calling Dot's membership in the Rising Volt Tacklers a trial period. Dot reveals to Liko and Roy that she joined the Rising Volt Tacklers after a visit from Friede led her to leave her room and find inspiration for her Nidothing videos outside the internet, with her "trial" being an excuse to persuade Franka. When Dot and Franka argue, Franka realizes Dot has become a Pokémon trainer and challenges her to a battle, during which Quaxly learns a Low Kick attack and defeats Franka's Lycanroc. Dot asks for Franka's permission to stay with the Rising Volt Tacklers, expressing newfound appreciation for the world through her friends, to which an overjoyed Franka approves.
1276	1265	42	"Transform! Hero of the Seas, Palafin (Transform! The Hero of the Sea, Irukaman!)"; Transliteration: "Henshin! Umi no Hīrō Irukaman" (Japanese: 変身！海のヒーローイルカマン！)	Ayumi Moriyama	Kimiko Ueno	Yūhei Takaboshi, Natsumi Hattori & Megumi Matsumoto	March 8, 2024	September 9, 2024 (UK); November 22, 2024 (US)
Arriving in Paldea, the Rising Volt Tacklers take a trip to a beach protected by Palafin, a heroic transforming Pokémon. Palafin is pestered by a group of cameramen who are obsessed with photographing its transformation, something Palafin has never shown anyone. While faking an emergency to lure Palafin, one of the cameramen is attacked by a group of Klawf for real. Respecting Palafin's privacy, Liko has Sprigatito distract the cameramen to help Palafin transform, which it allows Liko to witness. Palafin rescues the cameraman with the help of Ludlow's own secret superhero identity, Mighty G. Looking through photographs of the day's events, the group notices a suspicious spire in the distance.
1277	1266	43	"A Challenge from the Explorers (A Letter of Challenge from the Explorers)"; Transliteration: "Ekusupurōrāzu kara no Hatashijō" (Japanese: エクスプローラーズからの果たし状)	Directed by : Yoshihiko Iwata; Storyboarded by : Hiromasa Amano & Daiki Tomiyasu	Naruki Nagakawa	Yoshitaka Yanagihara & Keita Hagiwara	March 15, 2024	September 9, 2024 (UK); November 22, 2024 (US)
During a shopping trip, Liko and Roy help an elderly shopkeeper with a delivery, and receive a limited edition box of Wiglett sweet buns as thanks. Coral, who covets the same treat, sends Liko and Roy a letter demanding it from them after the rest of the shop's supply is sold out. Liko angers Coral by opening the box to share with her, not realizing Coral only values the box as a collectable. Coral challenges Liko and Roy to a battle, which is joined by Sidian. The battle is interrupted when the Explorers are summoned to their island base, exposing their plan to summon Rayquaza. Liko, Roy, and Friede deduce the nearby spire to be their base and decide to investigate.
1278	1267	44	"The Plan to Capture Rayquaza (A Plan to Capture Rayquaza)"; Transliteration: "Rekkūza Hokaku Keikan" (Japanese: レックウザ捕獲計画)	Hiroaki Takagi	Kureha Matsuzawa	Yusuke Oshida, Chiaki Kurakazu, Masaya Ōnishi & Akihiko Oka	March 22, 2024	September 9, 2024 (UK); November 22, 2024 (US)
The Rising Volt Tacklers confront the Explorers' scheme to ensnare the Black Rayquaza. Friede, accompanied by Liko and Roy, investigates a mysterious tower, only to be ensnared by Spinel's trap. While Friede and Captain Pikachu battle to escape, Liko and Roy discover the true location—a lighthouse where the Explorers use a resonance device mimicking Terapagos's energy to summon Rayquaza. As Rayquaza appears, the Explorers launch an assault using coordinated attacks from Glalie, Garganacl, and Medicham. Dot, showcasing her growth, develops a shutdown program and bravely infiltrates the lighthouse to disable the device. Despite their efforts, the Brave Olivine sustains significant damage from Rayquaza's counterattack.
1279	1268	45	"From So Far Away (To A Place Far, Far Away)"; Transliteration: "Haruka, Tooku made" (Japanese: はるか、遠くまで)	Directed by : Fumihiro Ueno; Storyboarded by : Hiromasa Amano & Tetsuo Yajima	Kureha Matsuzawa	Takashi Shinohara	March 29, 2024	September 9, 2024 (UK); November 22, 2024 (US)
After the battle with Black Rayquaza, Friede, Liko, and Roy regroup safely with their crew. With Dot's assistance, they pursue Rayquaza again. Amethio also joins the confrontation. Despite their efforts, Rayquaza proves formidable until Liko's Sprigatito evolves into Floragato, and Roy's Fuecoco show newfound strength, causing Rayquaza to retreat. Amethio vows to return for Terapagos. The team decides to continue their quest with renewed determination. Meanwhile, Gibeon plans to let the Rising Volt Tacklers gather the Six Heroes while they monitor Terapagos and Liko, aiming to obtain the "Laquium" for himself with the help of a White Zygarde.

== Release ==
On December 16, 2022, The Pokémon Company announced that a new series of the Pokémon anime would air in Japan on April 14, 2023, following the conclusion of a final arc that served as an epilogue to Pokémon Ultimate Journeys, set to conclude the story of Ash Ketchum, the main protagonist of the anime series since it began on April 1, 1997, and concluded on March 24, 2023. The first trailer was released on March 3, 2023, announcing that the series would premiere in Japan on April 14, 2023.

On November 9, 2023, it was announced that the English dub would debut in the UK on BBC iPlayer and CBBC on December 4. In the United States, it was originally set for a February 23, 2024, premiere on Netflix, but was later announced to premiere on March 7.

International release date and networks
Country/territory	Release date	Network(s)	Ref.
South Korea	August 23, 2023	Tooniverse (Liko and Roy's Departure only); KBS Kids; Cartoon Network; JEI Talent TV (Terastal Debut only)	
United Kingdom	December 1, 2023	BBC TWO (CBBC block); CBBC; BBC iPlayer	
France	December 9, 2023	Canal J Gulli	
Germany	February 9, 2024	Super RTL (Toggo block)	
Spain	February 26, 2024	Boing	
Italy	February 27, 2024	Boing	
Australia	February 27, 2024	9Go! (Note: Series was removed from site and channel in October 2024. Thirty-five episodes were released before removing.)	
Canada	March 2, 2024	Cartoon Network; Télétoon	
Latin America	March 7, 2024	Netflix	
Norway	March 7, 2024	Netflix	
United States	March 7, 2024	Netflix	
Finland	March 7, 2024	Netflix	
Sweden	March 7, 2024	Netflix	
Netherlands	March 7, 2024	Netflix	
Poland	March 7, 2024	Netflix	
Denmark	March 7, 2024	Netflix	
Turkey	March 7, 2024	Netflix	
Southeast Asia	March 8, 2024	YouTube	
Portugal	March 18, 2024	Panda Kids	
Sub-saharan Africa	March 25, 2024	Cartoon Network (Africa)	
Indonesia	April 12, 2024	Mentari TV; YouTube; Rajawali Televisi	
India	May 25, 2024	Hungama TV; YouTube	
Hong Kong	May 26, 2024	HOY TV; YouTube	
Thailand	August 30, 2024	TrueVisions; YouTube	
Singapore	September 7, 2024	Channel 5	
Vietnam	May 30, 2026	VTV2; FPT Play; YouTube	

== Music ==
The opening themes are "Heart-Pounding Diary" (ドキメキダイアリー, Dokimeki Daiarī) by Asmi featuring Chinozo, and "Halo" (ハロ, Haro) by Yama and BotchiBoromaru. The ending theme is "RVR: Rising Volt Tacklers' Rap" (RVR〜ライジングボルテッカーズラップ〜, RVR: Raijingu Borutekkāzu Rappu), an image song performed by Liko (Minori Suzuki) and Roy (Yuka Terasaki).

The English opening theme song outside of Asia is "Becoming Me" by Ed Goldfarb and Haven Paschall, with an instrumental version used as the ending theme. In Asia, "We Go" (English Version) by Aespa is used as the English opening theme, though the ending theme is the same as the English dub, being an instrumental version of "Becoming Me".
