= Pokémon the Movie 2000 =

1999 Japanese anime film directed by Kunihiko Yuyama

- Theatrical release poster

Japanese name
- Kanji: 劇場版ポケットモンスター 幻のポケモン ルギア爆誕
- Literal meaning: Pocket Monsters the Movie: The Phantom Pokémon – Lugia's Explosive Birth
Transcriptions
- Revised Hepburn: Gekijō-ban Pokettomonsutā Maboroshi no Pokemon Rugia Bakutan
- Directed by: Kunihiko Yuyama
- Screenplay by: Takeshi Shudo
- Based on: Pokémon: Adventures in the Orange Islands by Satoshi Tajiri, & Nintendo
- Produced by: Choji Yoshikawa; Yukako Matsusako; Takemoto Mori
- Starring: Rica Matsumoto; Ikue Ōtani; Mayumi Iizuka; Yūji Ueda; Megumi Hayashibara; Shin-ichiro Miki; Inuko Inuyama; Unshō Ishizuka; Kōichi Yamadera; Takeshi Kaga; Tamao Satō
- Cinematography: Hisao Shirai
- Edited by: Toshio Henmi; Yutaka Ito
- Music by: Shinji Miyazaki
- Production company: OLM, Inc.
- Distributed by: Toho
- Release date: July 17, 1999 (Japan)
- Running time: 82 minutes
- Country: Japan
- Language: Japanese
- Budget: $30 million
- Box office: $133.9 million

Pokémon the Movie 2000 (Note: Known in Japan as Pocket Monsters the Movie: The Phantom Pokémon - Lugia's Explosive Birth (Japanese: 劇場版ポケットモンスター 幻のポケモン ルギア爆誕, Hepburn: Gekijō-ban Pokettomonsutā Maboroshi no Pokemon Rugia Bakutan)) is a 1999 Japanese animated fantasy adventure film directed by Kunihiko Yuyama. It is the second film of the Pokémon anime series and of Pokémon the Series: The Beginning.

The events of the film take place during Pokémon: Adventures in the Orange Islands, where Ash, Misty and Tracey enter Shamouti Island. While there, they discover the three legendary bird Pokémon, Articuno, Zapdos, and Moltres. Meanwhile, a collector named Lawrence III attempts to steal the three Pokémon to awaken Lugia, which proves dangerous for the legendary Pokémon, Lugia, and Ash himself.

Pokémon the Movie 2000 was released in Japanese theaters on July 17, 1999, by Toho. The English-language adaptation was released in the United States on July 21, 2000, by Warner Bros. Pictures. The film earned less at the box office than its predecessor, Pokémon: The First Movie, but was still a financial success and received better (albeit still negative) reviews upon release.

== Plot ==
An ancient prophecy predicts that a conflict between "the Titans of Fire, Ice, and Lightning" will only be quelled by the "Water's Great Guardian" with the help of a "Chosen One". Lawrence III, a Pokémon collector, plans to capture the legendary Pokémon Articuno, Zapdos, and Moltres and sets out in his flying fortress to the Orange Islands, where he locates and captures Moltres. Meanwhile, Ash Ketchum, Misty, and Tracey Sketchit are crossing the Orange Islands when they are caught in a storm and washed ashore on Shamouti Island. The inhabitants are celebrating their annual festival and select Ash as their "Chosen One", who, festival maiden Melody explains, must retrieve three crystal balls from each of the legendary birds' islands and bring them to Shamouti's shrine.

Moltres' capture upsets the balance of power the birds have over the world's climate and storms start to erupt worldwide. In Pallet Town, Professor Oak notices a change in Pokémon behavior and he and Ash's mother, Delia Ketchum, fly to the Orange Islands after receiving word of what is happening there by Professor Ivy. As the weather starts to change, Ash and his Pikachu are brought by boat to Fire Island, where they find Moltres' treasure, but they are interrupted by Team Rocket. Zapdos attempts to claim the empty island, but is then captured by Lawrence, alongside Ash, his friends, and Team Rocket. The group discover Lawrence's plan and, while he attempts to capture Articuno (which he failed to do), Ash's Pokémon free Moltres, who in turn frees Zapdos, and the two begin fighting, which causes the fortress to crash on Lightning Island.

Articuno, Moltres, and Zapdos begin battling one another while Ash retrieves Zapdos' Treasure; the group are transported to Shamouti's shrine, guarded by a talking Slowking. The water's great guardian, the legendary Pokémon Lugia, emerges from the sea and attempts to stop Articuno, Moltres, and Zapdos' fighting, but is defeated. With the prophecy seemingly coming true, the group realize Ash is the actual Chosen One, and Lugia, revived when Melody plays the festival song on her conch, explains telepathically only Ash can restore harmony to the world by retrieving Articuno's Treasure. Ash heads to Ice Island, navigating through the legendary birds' battle with help from Team Rocket, wanting to save the world to continue their villainy. Ash retrieves Articuno's Treasure and Lugia starts to fly them back to Shamouti; Team Rocket sacrifice themselves to help in the process. Lawrence attempts to capture Lugia, who uses a powerful Aeroblast to destroy the remains of Lawrence's airship; severely weakened, Lugia and Ash collapse into the sea.

Misty and Tracey rescue Ash and Pikachu and return them to Shamouti, where Ash places the final treasure and Melody plays the festival's song, causing the storms to subside, bringing harmony to the legendary birds, causing the currents behind the disruption to the world's climates to dissipate, and reviving Lugia. Articuno, Moltres, and Zapdos return to their respective islands, and Lugia thanks Ash for his efforts as he returns to the sea. Ash is reunited with his mother who tells him to be more careful, Lawrence contemplates restarting his collection, and Team Rocket are told by Slowking that the audience saw their heroics and they debate whether they should now change their ways.

== Cast ==
Main cast
Character		Japanese voice actor	English voice actor
Japanese name	English name	Japanese voice actor	English voice actor
Satoshi	Ash Ketchum	Rica Matsumoto	Veronica Taylor
Pikachu		Ikue Ōtani	Ikue Ōtani
Kasumi	Misty	Mayumi Iizuka	Rachael Lillis
Togepi		Satomi Kōrogi	Satomi Kōrogi
Kenji	Tracey Sketchit	Tomokazu Seki	Ted Lewis
Musashi	Jessie	Megumi Hayashibara	Rachael Lillis
Kojirō	James	Shin-ichiro Miki	Eric Stuart
Nyarth	Meowth	Inuko Inuyama	Maddie Blaustein
Hanako	Delia Ketchum	Masami Toyoshima	Veronica Taylor
Dr. Yukinari Ōkido	Professor Samuel Oak	Unshō Ishizuka	Stuart Zagnit
Dr. Uchikido	Professor Felina Ivy	Keiko Han	Megan Hollingshead
Koduck	Psyduck	Rikako Aikawa	Michael J. Haigney
Mariru	Marill	Mika Kanai	Kayzie Rogers
Barrierd	Mr. Mime	Yūji Ueda	Kayzie Rogers
Lugia		Koichi Yamadera	Eric Rath
Fire	Moltres	Rikako Aikawa	Rikako Aikawa
Freezer	Articuno	Yumi Tōma	Yumi Tōma
Thunder	Zapdos	Katsuyuki Konishi	Katsuyuki Konishi
Fleura	Melody	Akiko Hiramatsu	Amy Birnbaum
Yadoking	Slowking	Masatoshi Hamada	Nathan Price
Gelardan	Lawrence III	Takeshi Kaga	Neil Stewart
Data Computer		Emi Shinohara	Emily Niebo
Yodel	Carol	Aya Hisakawa	Michelle Goguen
Earthia Island Elder	Tobias (Shamouti Island Elder)	Chikao Ohtsuka	Norman Altman
Michiko	Maren	Kotono Mitsuishi	Tara Jayne
Narrator		Unshō Ishizuka	Rodger Parsons

Characters exclusive to Pikachu's Rescue Adventure
Character		Japanese voice actor	English voice actor
Japanese name	English name	Japanese voice actor	English voice actor
Erekiddo	Elekid	Masako Nozawa	Masako Nozawa
Narrator		Tamao Satō	—N/a

== Production ==
=== Japanese production ===
Pokémon the Movie 2000 was directed by Kunihiko Yuyama and written by Takeshi Shudō. The film was produced by OLM, Inc. under the Pikachu Project '99 production committee.

Shudō conceived the idea for a new Pokémon associated with ocean currents specifically for the film. Initially referred to as "Pokémon X" during development, the creature eventually became Lugia, whose name was selected during a meeting involving representatives from the Pokémon franchise. Shudō later expressed surprise that Lugia subsequently appeared in the video games and television series, as he had originally envisioned it as a character exclusive to the film.

Shudō recalled that an early version of the screenplay did not feature Ash Ketchum or Team Rocket. After receiving feedback from other members of the production staff, he revised the story to introduce the established characters from the beginning. He intended the narrative to explore themes of personal identity and coexistence, particularly the possibility of individuals recognising their differences without resorting to conflict.

=== English-language adaptation ===
The English-language adaptation was produced by 4Kids Entertainment, with Norman J. Grossfeld serving as producer and Michael Haigney directing the adaptation. Grossfeld and Haigney were also credited with adapting the screenplay. The English version featured a different musical score, credited to Ralph Schuckett and John Loeffler, replacing the Japanese score composed by Shinji Miyazaki.

== Release ==
=== Theatrical release ===
The Power of One was released in Japan on July 17, 1999. and was accompanied by the animated short Pikachu's Rescue Adventure (Pikachū Tankentai). The short was also included in the North American theatrical release in July 2000.

On March 2, 2000, Warner Bros. Pictures announced they had acquired worldwide distribution rights to the film outside Asia from 4Kids Entertainment, following the success the two companies had with Pokémon: The First Movie. The film was released under their Kids' WB/Warner Bros. Family Entertainment labels on July 21, 2000, in the United States, with a July 15, 2000, premiere at Mann's Village Theatre.

=== Home media ===
In Japan, the film was released on VHS by Media Factory on 2 February 2000, followed by a DVD release on 22 November 2000. The Japanese DVD included the accompanying short film Pikachu's Rescue Adventure, with Japanese and English audio options.

In North America, Warner Home Video released Pokémon the Movie 2000 on VHS and DVD on 14 November 2000. The VHS retailed for US$22.96 and the DVD for US$24.98. As part of the release's marketing campaign, copies included a promotional Pokémon Trading Card Game card featuring Pikachu, while specially marked editions also contained a collectible Lugia coin. The releases included a preview of Pokémon 3: The Movie, while DVD extras featured musical performances, behind-the-scenes footage and the theatrical trailer. Warner also arranged promotional rebates in collaboration with Cracker Jack, Banquet Chicken and Nintendo's Hey You, Pikachu!.

On 9 February 2016, Viz Media released the film on Blu-ray in North America as part of the three-disc Pokémon: The Movies 1–3 Steelbook Blu-ray Collection, alongside Pokémon: The First Movie and Pokémon 3: The Movie. The collection featured the English-language versions of all three films. In the United Kingdom, Manga Entertainment released a similar collection on DVD and Blu-ray on 14 November 2016.

== Reception ==
=== Box office ===
As of 2015, the film is the 88th highest-grossing film in Japan, with ¥6.4 billion. The film made $133,949,270 worldwide at the end of its box office run.

The film was financially successful in the United States. It earned $9,250,000 on opening day, which was only less than $1 million behind the opening day of its predecessor. It reached third place for its opening weekend, grossing $19,575,608. On its second weekend it declined 68.3% to $6.2 million and descended to sixth place. It made $43,758,684 at the U.S. box office, barely over half of the first film's U.S. total.

=== Critical reception ===
On Rotten Tomatoes, the North American adaptation of the film has an approval rating of 20% based on 69 reviews, with the website's critical consensus reading: "Despite being somewhat more exciting than the previous film, this kiddy flick still lacks any real adventure or excitement. What it does contain is choppy animation and poor voice acting. Doesn't match up to virtually anything out there." On Metacritic the film has a weighted average score of 28 out of 100, based on 20 critics, indicating "generally unfavorable reviews". Audiences polled by CinemaScore gave the film an average grade of "A−" on an A+ to F scale.

Plugged In said that "the plot is as tiresome as it was in the first movie. But the violence is tamed somewhat, so the positive messages shine a bit more brightly".

Elvis Mitchell of The New York Times, dismissed the film as cheaply animated and confusing, describing it as a patchwork of television material, criticising its unwieldy plot and dialogue, and concluding that it offered little appeal beyond devoted children already fluent in the Pokémon world.

A more positive review was given by Gene Seymour of the Los Angeles Times. Seymour believed that the film "charms without talking down to its audience". He also compared it favorably to the first movie, stating, "...unlike its predecessor, Pokémon 2000 doesn't assume that everyone who sees it will know how to tell Togepi from Bulbasaur or Squirtle from Pikachu. Sure, I know now, but I'm not telling because I don't have to".

At the 2000 Stinkers Bad Movie Awards, the film was nominated for "Worst Achievement in Animation" and "The Remake or Sequel Nobody Was Clamoring For". However, it lost "Worst Achievement in Animation" to Digimon: The Movie.

== Soundtracks ==
In Japan, Namie Amuro performed the film's ending theme, "toi et moi", which was released as a single on 7 July 1999.

The Japanese soundtrack, Pokémon: The Movie 2000 Original Music Collection, was released by Media Factory on 15 September 1999. The album featured music by Shinji Miyazaki alongside vocal performances by Rica Matsumoto, Akiko Hiramatsu, Takeshi Kaga and Amuro. Its eleven tracks included the opening theme "Rival!", "Hateshinai Sekai", "Minna ga Ita Kara" and "toi et moi".

=== Pokémon 2000: The Power of One - Music from and Inspired by the Motion Picture ===
Pokémon 2000: The Power of One - Music from and Inspired by the Motion Picture

Soundtrack album by Various artists
- Released: July 18, 2000
- Genre: Pop
- Label: Atlantic
- Producer: Various

The North American soundtrack was released alongside the film in 2000 by WB's then-sister company Atlantic Records on compact disc and compact cassette and includes many songs by popular artists, many of which do not appear in the film. In the English dub, Donna Summer sings the closing song in the film, "The Power of One". The melody of has been noted as having a close resemblance to Rick Wakeman's theme for the film The Burning, with the two opening bars being identical. The song was released as a single and was remixed by Jonathan Peters and Tommy Musto. The song drew new attention in 2011 due to Republican candidate Herman Cain quoting the lyrics as part of his campaign for President of the United States.

"Weird Al" Yankovic provided an original song, "Polkamon", which is played during the ending credits. The last song played during the credits was "Flying Without Wings" by Westlife. Italian singer Laura Pausini sings the ballad "The Extra Mile", written, among others, by Australian singer Tina Arena. The B-52s also recorded the song "The Chosen One" for the movie.

In the United States, the soundtrack had sold 150,000 copies by April 2001.

==== Track listing ====
No.	Title	Writer(s)	Performed by	Length
1.	"The Power of One"	Mark Chait, John Loeffler, Ralph Schuckett, Mervyn Warren	Donna Summer	3:49
2.	"Dreams"	LaShawn Daniels, Fred Jerkins III, Lee Jerkins, Rodney Jerkins, Mischke, Robert Smith	Alysha	4:04
3.	"They Don't Understand (Pokemon Version) (Note: The song was later reworked for their self-titled debut album entitled, "Dream Street" which was released on July 10, 2001 and was simply called "They Don't Understand" with lyrical changes.)"	Cole Diamond, Steve Diamond, Robbie Nevil, Rex Rideout	Dream Street	2:58
4.	"Wonderland"	Matt Rowe, Pamela Sheyne	Angela Vía	3:52
5.	"With All Your Heart"	Kasia Livingston, Phil Sillas	Plus One	3:40
6.	"The Extra Mile"	Tina Arena, Andrew Frampton, Pamela Sheyne	Laura Pausini	4:05
7.	"Flying Without Wings"	Wayne Hector, Steve Mac	Westlife	3:35
8.	"Pokémon World (Movie Version)"	John Loeffler, John Siegler	Youngstown featuring Nobody's Angel	3:48
9.	"Blah, Blah, Blah"	Jörgen Elofsson, Steve Mac	Devotion 2 Music	2:34
10.	"Polkamon"	"Weird Al" Yankovic	"Weird Al" Yankovic	2:03
11.	"The Chosen One"	Norman J. Grossfeld, Michael Haigney, John Loeffler, John Petersen	The B-52s	3:24
12.	"One Heart"	Wayne Hector, Steve Mac	O-Town	3:59
13.	"One"	Matt Rowe, Pamela Sheyne	Denisse Lara	4:13
14.	"Comin' to the Rescue"	Louis Cortelezzi, Norman J. Grossfeld, John Loeffler, John Siegler	O-Town	1:45
15.	"Pikachu's Rescue Adventure: Dance of the Bellossom"	John Lissauer, John Loeffler	Various	1:05
16.	"The Power of One: The Legend Comes to Life"	John Loeffler, Ralph Schuckett	Various	4:16

==== Chart performance ====
Chart (2000–2001)	Peak position
Austrian Albums (Ö3 Austria)	51
Swiss Albums (Schweizer Hitparade)	89
US Billboard 200	85

=== Pokémon the Movie 2000 Original Motion Picture Score ===
Pokémon the Movie 2000 Original Motion Picture Score is the orchestral soundtrack to the movie. The CD was originally released in some European countries in 2000. In 2004, it became available for download worldwide on iTunes.

Pokémon the Movie 2000 Original Motion Picture Score

Film score by Ralph Schuckett
- Released: July 18, 2000
- Genre: Orchestral
- Label: Koch Records
- Producer: Ralph Schuckett

Ralph Schuckett chronology
Pokémon the Movie 2000 Soundtrack (2000)	Pokémon the Movie 2000 Original Motion Picture Score (2000)	Totally Pokémon (2001)

==== Track listing ====
All music is composed by Ralph Schuckett.

No.	Title	Length
1.	"Harmony Disturbed"
2.	"The Beast of the Sea Stirs"
3.	"To the Rescue"
4.	"Breakout Mayhem"
5.	"If Only They Could Help"
6.	"The World Turns to Ash"
7.	"To the Third Treasure"
8.	"Return to the Shrine"
9.	"The Guardian's Song"
10.	"Goodbye Lugia"
11.	"The Adventure Begins"
12.	"Windy"
13.	"Teamwork"
14.	"Pokémon World"

== See also ==
- List of Pokémon films
- List of films based on video games

== Bibliography ==
- Galbraith IV, Stuart (2008). The Toho Studios Story: A History and Complete Filmography. Scarecrow Press. ISBN 978-1461673743.
