= Rica Matsumoto =

Japanese voice actress and singer (born 1968)

- 松本 梨香
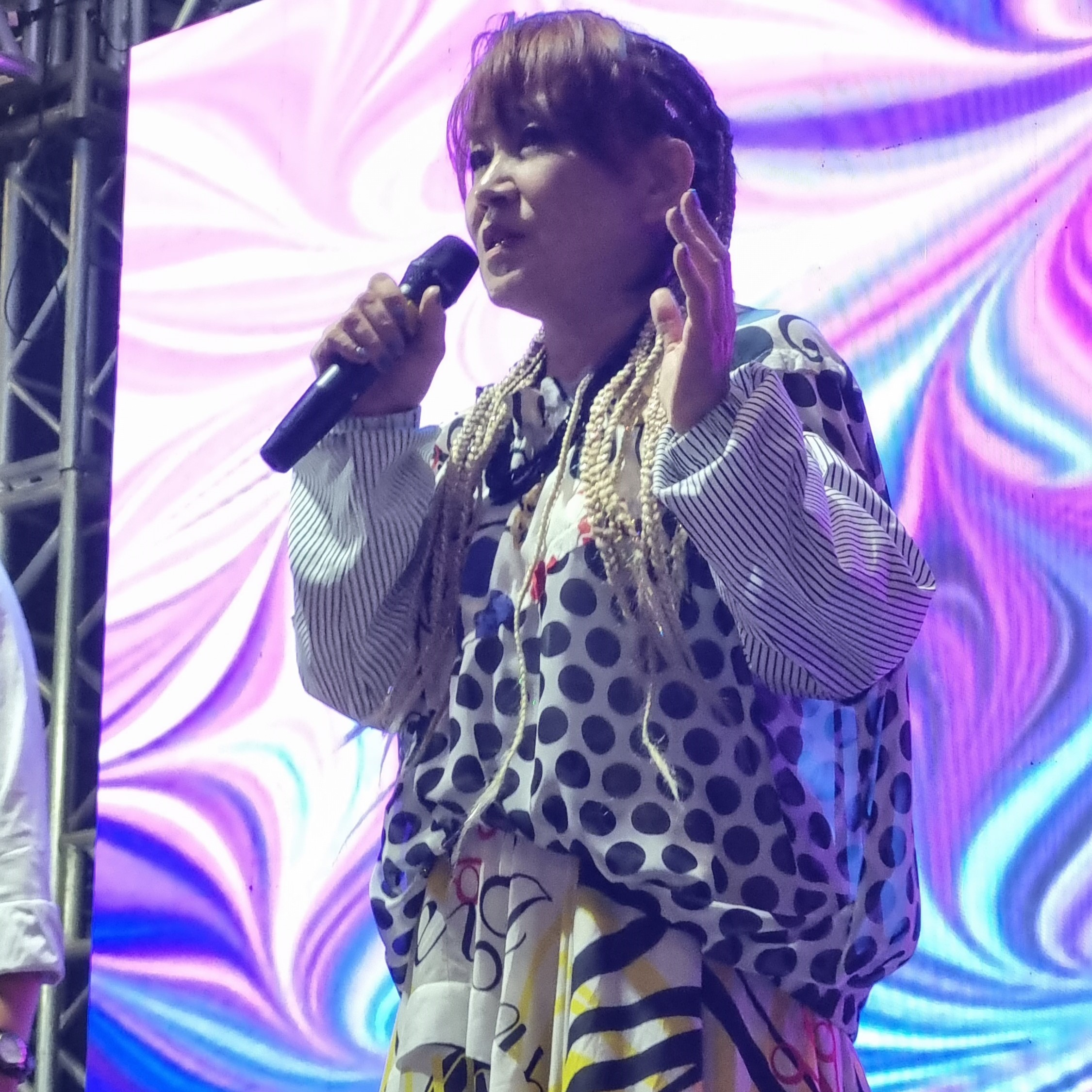
- Rica Matsumoto at Anime Summit Chibi in Brasília, Brazil, 2023
- Born: November 30, 1968 (age 57); Yokohama, Kanagawa, Japan
- Occupations: Actress; voice actress; singer
- Years active: 1986–present
- Notable work: Satoshi (Ash Ketchum) (Pokémon)
- Height: 160 cm (5 ft 3 in)
- Musical career
- Genres: J-pop; Anison
- Instrument: Vocals
- Years active: 1993–present
- Labels: Media Factory; Tokuma Japan Communications

Rica Matsumoto (松本 梨香, Matsumoto Rika; born November 30, 1968) is a Japanese actress, voice actress, and singer who was born in Yokohama, Japan. Her name is also sometimes romanized as Rika Matsumoto. She was one of the founders of the anison band JAM Project.

After early stage work, she began both voice acting and singing careers. Her most notable role is Satoshi (Ash Ketchum in English localizations), the original main character of the anime series Pokémon. Other notable roles include Rumi Hidaka in Perfect Blue, Ryo Bakura in Yu-Gi-Oh!, Midori Kodama in Azuki Chan, and Aoi Futaba in You're Under Arrest. Matsumoto also performs the songs for many of the openings for the Japanese Pokémon anime.

Matsumoto has had lead or supporting roles in dozens of series. She has also had a radio show in Japan and does some dubbing work for translations of American films and TV series into Japanese. In April 2008, she announced in she was taking time off from JAM Project to focus on her solo work.

== Filmography ==
=== Television animation ===
Year	Title	Role	Other notes
1988	Anpan Man	Rakugaki Kozō	
1988	Osomatsu-kun	Choromatsu	Debut role
1988	Wowser	Blackie	
1990	Anpan Man	Piano Man	
1990	Heisei Tensai Bakabon	Nise Musuko, Kumada-kun, ryokan employee, lazy wife, multiple other roles	
1990	Magical Angel Sweet Mint	Aru, Gureamu	
1991	Anpan Man	Baby Donut	
1991	City Hunter '91	Sonya	
1991	Jankenman	Soccer-kun	
1991	Magical Princess Minky Momo	kid B	
1991	Marude Dameo	Kanemochi Sugoi, young dinosaur, Prince, town girl	
1991	Ochame na Futago	Kerry	
1991	Matchless Raijin-Oh	Jin Hyuga	First leading role
1991	Moero! Top Striker	Julian	
1992	Anpan Man	Natto Man, Shūmai Musume, Medamayaki-kun	
1992	The Brave Fighter of Legend Da-Garn	Seiji Takasugi	
1992	Calimero	Pankuratcho	
1992	Genki Bakuhatsu Ganbaruger	Jin Hyuga	
1992	My Patrasche	Jan	
1992	Tekkaman Blade	Rick	
1993	Anpan Man	Tengu Boy	
1993	Mobile Suit Victory Gundam	Haro, Warren Trace, Renda de Paloma	
1993	Muka Muka Paradise	Hazuki	
1994	Akazukin Chacha	Poppy-kun	
1994	Tonde Burin	Keiko Kuroha, Buta Session, Buta Session G	
1994	Yu Yu Hakusho	Kiyoshi Mitarai, Koashura	
1995	Azuki-chan	Midori Kodama, Yōko's mother	
1995	Mama Loves the Poyopoyo-Saurus	Miki Poyota	
1995	Ninku	Fūsuke	
1996	Ganba! Fly High	Mariko Sagara	
1996	Kaiketsu Zorro	Bernardo	
1996	Magical Girl Pretty Sammy	Chihiro	
1996	You're Under Arrest	Aoi Futaba	
1997	Anpan Man	Kurukuru Okoma-chan	
1997	Pocket Monsters: Episode Sekiei League	Satoshi (Ash Ketchum), Sakaki's Persian	
1998	Bomberman B-Daman Bakugaiden	Shuringe	
1998	Dokkiri Doctor	Tomoko Asaoka	
1998	Hikarian	Hikarian Star Queen	
1998	If I See You in My Dreams	Namiko Isobe	
1998	The Kindaichi Case Files	Narumi Fuwa, Reiko Kitami	
1998	Master Keaton	Ilya	
1998	Outlaw Star	James "Jim" Hawking	
1998	Trigun	Kaite	
1999	Bomberman B-Daman Bakugaiden V	Witchy	
1999	Hoshin Engi	Raishinshi	
1999	Now and Then, Here and There	Sis	
1999	Pocket Monsters: Episode Orange Archipelago	Satoshi (Ash Ketchum), Sakaki's Persian	
1999	Pocket Monsters: Episode Gold & Silver	Satoshi (Ash Ketchum), Sakaki's Persian	
2000	Case Closed	Ritsuko Usui	
2000	Hidamari no Ki	Okon	
2000	Lupin III: $1 Money Wars	Sandy Fishburne	
2000	Mon Colle Knights	Flame Angel	
2000	Mewtwo! I Am Here	Satoshi (Ash Ketchum), Sakaki's Persian	TV special
2000	Rerere no Tensai Bakabon	Momotarō, Non-chan	
2000	Vandread	Fanieta	
2001	Captain Tsubasa	Kojirō Hyūga	As a boy
2001	Star Ocean EX	Opera Vectra	
2001	You're Under Arrest Second Season	Aoi Futaba	
2001	Yu-Gi-Oh! Duel Monsters	Ryo Bakura (Dark Bakura/Thief King Bakura)	Succeeded Yo Inoue
2002	Bomberman Jetters	Misty	
2002	Case Closed	Reiko Kujō	
2002	Dragon Drive	Mukai	
2002	Fortune Dogs	Pochi	
2002	Gun Frontier	Sinunora	
2002	Hanada Shōnen Shi	Jiro, Yōhei, Madame Katherine, Satsuki Baa-san, Yoshiko's friend	
2002	Pocket Monsters Side Stories	Satoshi (Ash Ketchum), Sakaki's Persian	
2002	Pocket Monsters: Advanced Generation	Satoshi (Ash Ketchum), Sakaki's Persian	
2002	You're Under Arrest	Aoi Futaba	
2003	Astro Boy	Reno	
2003	Case Closed	Jun Kataoka	
2003	Machine Robo Rescue	Chāmī Satō	
2003	Ninja Scroll	Nekome	
2004	Gokusen	Shizuka Fujiyama	
2004	Gravion Zwei	Dr. Barnett	
2004	The Prince of Tennis	Hanna	
2005	Black Jack	Jun, Satoru	
2005	Naruto	Suzume-bachi	
2005	Oku-sama wa Mahō Shōjo: Bewitched Agnes	Freya	
2005	Paradise Kiss	Koizumi-kun	
2005	Super Robot Monkey Team Hyperforce Go!	Chiro	
2006	Majime ni Fumajime Kaiketsu Zorori	Mirai Saeda	
2006	The Terrifying Mirage Pokémon	Satoshi (Ash Ketchum)	TV special
2006	Pocket Monsters: Diamond and Pearl	Satoshi (Ash Ketchum), Sakaki's Persian	
2007	MapleStory	Puudou	
2007	Neuro: Supernatural Detective	Ayumi Kaku (Hysteria)	
2007	Sgt. Frog	Yamato	
2007	You're Under Arrest: Full Throttle	Aoi Futaba	
2008	Atashin'chi	Monta	
2009	Chi's Sweet Home: Chi's New Address	Tora	
2010	Pocket Monsters: Best Wishes!	Satoshi (Ash Ketchum), Sakaki's Persian	
2012	Stitch! ~ Best Friends Forever ~	Zuruko (Tsuruko Sasuga)	
2012	Stitch! ~ The Mischievous Alien's Great Adventure ~	Zuruko (Tsuruko Sasuga)	
2012	Super Robot Wars Original Generation: The Inspector	Carla Borgnine	
2012	Humanity Has Declined	Doc	
2012	Pocket Monsters: Best Wishes! Season 2	Satoshi (Ash Ketchum), Sakaki's Persian	
2012	Stitch and the Planet of Sand	Zuruko (Tsuruko Sasuga)	
2013	Pocket Monsters: Best Wishes! Season 2: Episode N	Satoshi (Ash Ketchum), Sakaki's Persian	
2013	Pocket Monsters: Best Wishes! Season 2: Decolora Adventure	Satoshi (Ash Ketchum), Sakaki's Persian	
2013	Pocket Monsters: XY	Satoshi (Ash Ketchum)	
2015	Panpaka Pants	Silky	
2015	Pocket Monsters: XY&Z	Satoshi (Ash Ketchum)	
2016	Pocket Monsters: Sun & Moon	Satoshi (Ash Ketchum)	
2019	Pocket Monsters	Satoshi (Ash Ketchum)	
2021	Seven Knights Revolution: Hero Successor	Jabe	

=== Original video animation (OVA) ===
- Moldiver (1993) – Nozomu Ozora
- Dirty Pair Flash (1994–1996) – Kei
- Phantom Quest Corp (1994–1995) – Ayaka Kisaragi
- Ruin Explorers (1995–1996) – Rasha
- Miyuki-chan in Wonderland (1995) – Sumire-chan
- Magical Girl Pretty Sammy (1995) – Chihiro
- Fake (1996) – Bikky
- Shamanic Princess (1996–1998) – Japolo
- Sol Bianca: The Legacy (1999–2000) – April

=== Theatrical animation ===
- Metropolis (2001) (Female customer)
- Piano no Mori (2007) (Daigaku Kanehira)
- Roujin Z (1991) (Chie Satō)
- Taiho Shichauzo the Movie (1999) (Aoi Futaba)
- Hunter x Hunter (1998) (Gon Freecss)
- Perfect Blue (1998) (Rumi)
- Pocket Monsters films (1998–2020) (Satoshi)
- Yu-Gi-Oh!: The Dark Side of Dimensions (Bakura) (2016)
- DC Super Heroes vs. Eagle Talon (2017) (Wonder Woman)

=== Video games ===
- GeGeGe no Kitarō: Gyakushū! Yōma Dai Kessen (2003) (Kitarō)
- GeGeGe no Kitarō: Ibun Yōkai Kitan (2003) (Kitarō)
- GeGeGe no Kitarō: Kikiippotsu! Yōkai Rettō (2003) (Kitarō)
- Super Robot Wars Original Generations (2007, PlayStation 2) (Ricarla Borgnine)
- Lunar 2: Eternal Blue (1994) (Nall)
- Shinsetsu Samurai Spirits Bushido Retsuden (1997) (Rashojin Mizuki)
- Haunted Junction (1997, PlayStation) – Asahina Mutsuki
- Brave Fencer Musashi (1998) (Musashi)
- Maria 2: Jutaikokuchi no Nazo (1999) (Maria Kunitoma)
- Super Robot Wars Alpha (2000, PlayStation) (Ricarla Borgnine)
- Super Robot Wars GC (2004) / Super Robot Wars XO (2006) (Jin Hyuuga)
- Kingdom Hearts II (2005) (Megara)
- Super Robot Wars NEO (2009) (Jin Hyuuga)
- Mario Kart Arcade GP DX (2013) (Commentator)
- Super Robot Wars BX (2015) (Jin Hyuuga)
- Mobile Suit Gundam: Extreme Vs. Maxi Boost (2015) (Shiro Kyoda)
- Mobile Suit Gundam: Extreme Vs. Maxi Boost ON (2016) (Shiro Kyoda)
- Kingdom Hearts III (2019) (Megara)
- Pokémon Masters EX (2022) (Satoshi)
- Tasogare ni Hisomu Fukurou to, Akegata no Subaru (2024) (Subaru Sakaki)
- Super Robot Wars Y (2025) (Seiji Takasugi)

=== Tokusatsu ===
- Kousoku Sentai Turboranger (1989) (Bell Chime Boma (ep. 27), Amulet Boma (ep. 31))
- The Mobile Cop Jiban (1989) (Reporter (Actor) (ep. 9), Queen Cosmo (voice) (ep. 46))
- Chikyuu Sentai Fiveman (1990) (Arthur G6)
- Choujin Sentai Jetman (1991) (Trash Dimension (ep. 21))
- Kyōryū Sentai Zyuranger (1992) (Dora Laygor (ep. 33))
- Engine Sentai Go-onger (2008) (Savage Land Barbaric Machine Beast Bōseki Banki (ep. 22))
- Unofficial Sentai Akibaranger (2012) (Masako "Miyabi" Yamada)
- Kamen Rider Jeanne & Kamen Rider Aguilera with Girls Remix (2022) (Ms. Titan)
- Bakuage Sentai Boonboomger (2024) (Bundorio Bunderas, Boonboomger Equipment (Voice), Shiho Sato (Actor) (ep. 41))

=== Dubbing roles ===
==== Live-action ====
- Patricia Arquette
  - True Romance (Alabama Whitman)
  - Holy Matrimony (Havana)
  - Flirting with Disaster (Nancy Coplin)
  - Nightwatch (Katherine)
  - Bringing Out the Dead (Mary Burke)
  - Little Nicky (Valerie Veran)
  - Human Nature (Lila Jute)
  - Holes (Katherine "Kissin' Kate" Barlow)
  - Medium (Allison Dubois)
  - Boyhood (Olivia Evans)
  - CSI: Cyber (Avery Ryan)
  - Otherhood (Gillian Lieberman)
- Drew Barrymore
  - Bad Girls (1997 TV Asahi edition) (Lily Laronette)
  - Ever After (Danielle De Barbarac)
  - Never Been Kissed (Josie Geller)
  - Charlie's Angels (Dylan Sanders)
  - Riding in Cars with Boys (Beverly Ann "Bev" Donofrio)
  - Charlie's Angels: Full Throttle (Dylan Sanders)
  - 50 First Dates (Lucy Whitmore)
  - Fever Pitch (Lindsey Meeks)
- Renée Zellweger
  - A Price Above Rubies (Sonia Horowitz)
  - The Bachelor (Anne Arden)
  - Bridget Jones's Diary (Bridget Jones)
  - Chicago (Roxanne "Roxie" Hart)
  - Bridget Jones: The Edge of Reason (Bridget Jones)
  - Cinderella Man (Mae Braddock)
  - Leatherheads (Lexie Littleton)
  - Bridget Jones's Baby (Bridget Jones)
- Sandra Bullock
  - Demolition Man (1997 TV Asahi edition) (Lieutenant Lenina Huxley)
  - Speed (1998 TV Asahi edition) (Annie Porter)
  - The Net (TV Asahi edition) (Angela Bennett)
  - Miss Congeniality (2005 NTV edition) (Gracie Hart)
  - Crash (Jean Cabot)
  - Miss Congeniality 2: Armed and Fabulous (2008 NTV edition) (Gracie Hart)
- Reese Witherspoon
  - Pleasantville (Jennifer)
  - Little Nicky (Holly)
  - Legally Blonde (Elle Woods)
  - Sweet Home Alabama (Melanie "Carmichael" Smooter Perry)
  - Legally Blonde 2: Red, White & Blonde (Elle Woods)
  - This Means War (Lauren Scott)
- Juliette Lewis
  - Cape Fear (Danielle Bowden)
  - The Basketball Diaries (Diane Moody)
  - From Dusk till Dawn (Kate Fuller)
  - The Way of the Gun (Robin)
- All the Right Moves (1991 NTV edition) (Lisa Lietzke (Lea Thompson))
- Armour of God II: Operation Condor (Elsa)
- Beverly Hills, 90210 (Kelly Taylor (Jennie Garth))
- BH90210 (Jennie Garth/Kelly Taylor)
- Big Eyes (Margaret Keane (Amy Adams))
- Bill & Ted's Bogus Journey (Elizabeth (Annette Azcuy))
- Blue Velvet (1991 TV Tokyo edition) (Sandy Williams (Laura Dern))
- Bram Stoker's Dracula (1995 TV Asahi edition) (Mina Harker (Winona Ryder))
- Crank (Eve Lydon (Amy Smart))
- Crank: High Voltage (Eve Lydon (Amy Smart))
- Dinosaurs (Charlene Sinclair)
- A Discovery of Witches (Sarah Bishop (Alex Kingston))
- The Father (Anne (Olivia Colman))
- Father of the Bride (Annie Banks (Kimberly Williams-Paisley))
- Father of the Bride Part II (Annie Banks-Mackenzie (Kimberly Williams-Paisley))
- The Fifth Element (Leeloo Minaï Lekatariba-Laminaï-Tchaï Ekbat de Sebat (Milla Jovovich))
- Friday the 13th Part VIII: Jason Takes Manhattan (J.J. (Saffron Henderson))
- Friends (Melissa Warburton (Winona Ryder))
- Ghost Stories (Simon Rifkind (Alex Lawther))
- The Gilded Age (Agnes van Rhijn (Christine Baranski))
- He Got Game (Dakota Barns (Milla Jovovich))
- Heartbreakers (Page Conners (Jennifer Love Hewitt))
- The Huntsman: Winter's War (Bromwyn (Sheridan Smith))
- Kindergarten Cop (Cindy (Alix Koromzay))
- Kissing Jessica Stein (Helen Cooper (Heather Juergensen))
- Little Voice (Laura Hoff / LV (Jane Horrocks))
- The Medium (Nim (Sawanee Utoomma))
- Peaceful (Crystal (Catherine Deneuve))
- Romeo Must Die (Trish O'Day (Aaliyah))
- Secret Sunshine (Lee Shin-ae (Jeon Do-yeon))
- Stealing Beauty (Lucy Harmon (Liv Tyler))
- Ted (Norah Jones)
- The Terminator (2003 TV Tokyo edition) (Sarah Connor (Linda Hamilton))
- The War (Elvadine)
- Thunderbolt (Amy Yip) (Anita Yuen)
- Wonka (Mrs. Scrubbit (Olivia Colman))
- Wrong Turn (Jessie Burlingame (Eliza Dushku))
- Zoolander (Matilda Jeffries (Christine Taylor))

==== Animation ====
- Deep (Deep)
- Despicable Me 4 (Valentina)
- Jack and the Cuckoo-Clock Heart (Madeleine #1)
- The Road to El Dorado (Chel)
- Terra Willy (Willy)
- Trolls World Tour (Delta Dawn)

=== Live action ===
- Koeharu! (2021), as herself (guest star, episode 5)

== Discography ==
=== Albums ===
Title	Released	Label	Format(s)	Catalog #	Peak position	Sales	Notes
Cluster	April 28, 1993	EMI Music Japan	CD	TYCY-5301	—		
華の宴 (Hana no Utage)	May 19, 1993	EMI Music Japan	CD	TYTY-5302	—		
Destiny	July 12, 1995	Pioneer LDC	CD	PICA–1067	—		
Rica the Best	May 23, 2001	VAP	CD	VPCD-81374/5	—		2 CDs
まんまる (Manmaru)	September 30, 2009	Sound Mission Label	CD	ZMCZ-5087	—		
松本梨香が歌うポケモンソングベスト (Matsumoto Rika ga Utau Pokemon Songu Besuto)	July 16, 2011	Kadokawa / Media Factory	CD, digital download	ZMCP-7317	#85		Spent 7 weeks on the Oricon charts

=== Other songs ===
- "Get a Dream" (Opening of Sunrise Eiyuutan/Sunrise Eiyuutan R)
- "Alive A life" (Opening for Kamen Rider Ryuki, Remix tracks of Rider Chips' Song Attack Ride Vol.1)
- "Mezase Pokémon Master" (Opening for Pokémon: Original Series Chapter 1: Sekiei Rīgu)
- "Mezase Pokémon Master '98" (Opening for Pokémon Movie 1: Myūtsū no Gyakushū)
- "Mezase Pokémon Master 2001" (Opening for Pokémon Movie 4: Serebii Toki wo Koeta Deai)
- "Mezase Pokémon Master 2002" (Opening for Pokémon Movie 5: Mizu no Miyako no Mamori Gami – Latias to Latios)
- "Oyasumi, Boku no Pikachu" (from the Mezase Pokémon Masutā album)
- "Pokémon Master e no Michi" (from the Pokémon Rocket Gang! It's a White Tomorrow! CD drama) sung with Naoki Takao
- "Type: Wild" (Ending for Pokémon: Original Series Chapter 1: Sekiei Rīgu & Pokémon: Original Series Chapter 2: Orenji Shotō Hen)
- "Rival!" (Opening for Pokémon: Original Series Chapter 2: Orenji Shotō Hen & for Pokémon Movie 2: Maboroshi no Pokémon: Lugia Bakutan)
- "Minna de Aruko!" (from the Pokémon Rapurasu ni Notte album), sung with Ikue Ōtani, Mayumi Iizuka, Satomi Koorogi, Yūji Ueda, Rikako Aikawa, Tomokazu Seki, Mika Kanai & Megumi Hayashibara
- "Minna ga Itakara" (Insert song for Pokémon Movie 2: Maboroshi no Pokémon: Lugia Bakutan)
- "OK!" (Opening for Pokémon: Original Series Chapter 3: Kin-Gin Hen)
- "OK! 2000" (Opening for Pokémon Movie 3: Kesshou Tou no Teiou: Entei)
- "Challenger!" (Opening for Pokémon: Advanced Generation)
- "Spurt!" (Opening for Pokémon: Advanced Generation)
- "High Touch!" (Opening for Pokémon: Diamond and Pearl, sung with Megumi Toyoguchi)
- "High Tough! 2009" (Opening song of Gekijouban Pocket Monsters Diamond and Pearl: Arceus Chōkoku no Jikū e, and Opening for Pokémon: Diamond and Pearl, sung with Megumi Toyoguchi)
- "Burning Soul" (Hyuga Kojiro image song for the Captain Tsubasa: Road to 2002 Song Of Kickers CD)
- "Chiisana Dai Bouken" (Opening for Chi's Sweet Home: Chi's New Address)
- "Best Wishes!" (Opening for Pokémon: Best Wishes!)
- "In Your Heart" (From Ultraman Neos), sung with Project DMM
- "Yajirushi ni Natte!" (Opening for Pokémon: Best Wishes! Season 2)
- "Yajirushi ni Natte! 2013" (Opening for Pokémon: Best Wishes! Season 2 Episode N)
- "V (Boruto)" (Alternate Version) (Opening for Pokémon XY, sung with Jewel (J☆Dee'Z))
- "Getta Ban Ban" (Alternate Version) (Opening for Pokémon XY, sung with Ikue Ōtani)
- "XY&Z (Ekkusu Wai & Zetto)" (Opening for Pokémon XY&Z)
- "Arōra!!" (Opening for Pokémon Sun & Moon, sung with Ikue Ōtani)
- "Mezase Pokémon Masutā 20th Anniversary" (Opening for Pokémon Sun & Moon and for Gekijō-ban Poketto Monsutā Kimi ni kimeta!)
- "Mezase Pokémon Master 20th Anniversary Ballad ver."
- "Oyasumi, Boku no Pikachu 2017 ver."
- "Mezase Pokémon Master '98 (2019 Remaster)" (Opening for Myūtsū no Gyakushū EVOLUTION)
- "Go! Now! ~Alive A life neo~" (Ending theme for Kamen Rider Zi-O Spinoff – Rider Time: Kamen Rider Ryuki)
- "1・2・3" (Opening for Pokémon Journeys, sung with Daiki Yamashita)
- Kotsukotsu-Pon-Pon (Ending theme for Boonboomger)
