= Pokémon Chronicles =

Television anime

- English logo for Pokémon Chronicles
- Anime television series
- Directed by: Kunihiko Yuyama (Chief); Norihiko Sudo; Sada Natori
- Produced by: Susumu Matsuyama; Takemoto Mori
- Music by: Shinji Miyazaki
- Studio: OLM, Inc.
- Licensed by: The Pokémon Company International
- Original network: TXN (TV Tokyo)
- English network: AUS: Cartoon Network; CA: YTV; UK: Toonami; US: Cartoon Network
- Original run: December 3, 2002 – September 28, 2004
- Episodes: 16 (Japanese version); 22 (English version)

Pokémon Chronicles (Note: partly known in Japan as Pocket Monsters: Side Stories (ポケットモンスター サイドストーリー, Poketto Monsutā: Saido Sutōrī)) is a Japanese anime television series, part of The Pokémon Company's Pokémon media franchise. It serves as a spin-off series of the Pokémon anime series, revolving around characters other than Ash Ketchum.

It first aired in Japan on December 3, 2002, on TV Tokyo and concluded on September 28, 2004. The series made its U.S. premiere on Cartoon Network on June 3, 2006, after it ended in most other countries.

Four DVDs have been released in the United Kingdom, with a U.S. release still non-existent. All of the episodes have been released as extras on the first six-season box sets of Pokémon in Australia (the newer 6 DVD box sets do not have the Pokémon Chronicles episodes, while the older 14 DVD sets do). A box set containing all 22 episodes has also been released in Australia.

== Cast ==
=== Original Japanese cast ===
- Ikue Ōtani as Pikachu
- Rica Matsumoto as Ash Ketchum/Satoshi
- KAORI as May/Haruka
- Inuko Inuyama as Meowth/Nyarth
- Mayumi Iizuka as Misty/Kasumi
- Megumi Hayashibara as Jessie/Musashi
- Shin-ichiro Miki as James/Kojirō
- Satomi Kōrogi as Togepi
- Tomokazu Seki as Tracey Sketchit/Kenji
- Minami Takayama as Ritchie/Hirochi
- Unshō Ishizuka as Professor Oak/Dr. Yukinari Okido
- Masami Toyoshima as Delia Ketchum
- Yuji Ueda as Brock/Takeshi
- Yuko Kobayashi as Gary Oak/Shigeru Okido
- Takehito Koyasu as Butch
- Unshō Ishizuka as Narrator
- Chinami Nishimura as Officer Jenny

=== English cast ===
- Sean Schemmel as Jimmy
- Caren Manuel as Marina
- Veronica Taylor as Hun, Delia Ketchum, Ash Ketchum, May
- Marc Thompson as Attila
- Kevin Kolack as Vincent
- Dan Green as Eugene (known as Euisine in the main series)
- Rachael Lillis as Misty, Jessie, Violet, Beautifly
- Lisa Ortiz as Daisy
- Erica Schroeder (Note: credited as Bella Hudson) as Nurse Joy
- Lee Quick as Officer Jenny
- Stuart Zagnit (Note: credited as Stan Hart) as Professor Oak
- Tara Sands (Note: credited as Tara Jayne) as Ritchie, Benny DeMario, Bulbasaur, Phanpy and Teddiursa
- Ted Lewis (Note: credited as Ed Paul) as Tracey Sketchit, Giovanni
- Kerry Williams as Sakura, Casey
- Mike Pollock as Narrator
- Eric Stuart as James, Brock, Professor Sebastian, Butch, Weezing
- Maddie Blaustein as Meowth
- James Carter Cathcart (Note: credited as Jimmy Zoppi) as Dr. Nanba, Gary Oak
- Jason Griffith as Gilbert
- Kazuko Sugiyama as Celebi
- Andi Whaley as Cassidy, Teddiursa
- Amy Birnbaum as DJ Mary
- Ikue Ōtani as Pikachu
- Koichi Sakaguchi as Arbok
- Satomi Kōrogi as Togepi
- Matt Hoverman as Corey DeMario
- Rodger Parsons as Narrator
- Mika Kanai as Chikorita
- Kayzie Rogers as Totodile, Cyndaquil, Wobbuffet, Espeon
- Alexander J. Rose as Santa Claus
- Michael Haigney as Geodude, Psyduck

== Episodes ==
Original Japanese version

EP#	Title	Original air date
1	"A Family That Battles Together Stays Together!" (タケシ！ニビジムをすくえ!, Takeshi! Nibi Jimu o Sukue!; Takeshi! Save Nibi Gym!)	December 3, 2002
Brock returns to Pewter City, but is shocked to discover that his mother has returned, and has turned the Pokémon Gym into a Water-type Gym. He now has to battle to save the Gym for his brother, Forrest.
2	"Cerulean Blues" (ハナダジムのリベンジマッチ!, Hanada Jimu no Ribenji Matchi!; Revenge Match at Hanada Gym!)	December 10, 2002
Misty returns home to become the leader of the Cerulean City Pokémon Gym, but has to deal with a number of problems that have cropped up during her absence, including a rampaging Gyarados and her rivals the Invincible Brothers seeking control of the Gym.
3	"We're No Angels!" (がんばれ！前向きロケット団, Ganbare! Maemuki Roketto-dan!; Tough Battle! Stay Positive, Team Rocket!)	December 17, 2002
Team Rocket lands in a village where they are mistaken for Team Righteous (a vintage TV superhero duo wearing identical uniforms), and face a dilemma deciding between building a robot army or living up to the high expectations of the villagers.
4	"Showdown at the Oak Corral" (オーキド邸だいけっせん!!, Ōkido-yashiki Daikessen!; Epic Battle at Okido's Lab)	January 14, 2003
Butch and Cassidy of Team Rocket break into Professor Oak's lab and steal all of the Poké Balls, so Ash's Pokémon have to get them back.
5	"The Blue Badge of Courage" (カスミ！ブルーバッジをゲットせよ!, Kasumi! Burū Bajji o Getto se yo!; Kasumi! Get the Blue Badge!)	February 25, 2003
Tracey and Sakura visit Misty at the Cerulean City Pokémon Gym, so that Sakura can battle Misty for a Gym Badge. Misty is out of Gym Badges, however, so the three of them travel to the home of the badge maker.
6	"Of Meowth and Pokémon" (出会いのミレニアムタウン / アルバイトはたいへんニャース！？, Deai no Mireniamu Taun / Arubaito wa taihen Nyāsu!?; The Millennium Town Encounter! / Nyarth with a Part-Time Job!?)	March 4, 2003
Meowth takes a break from trying to capture Pikachu to spend time in Big Town. But his dream project to build a golden statue gets off to a bad start when he loses his picnic basket in a series of mix-ups. And then to pay for it he gets some jobs, but makes the Pichu possé to do the work. This story is continued in "Trouble In Big Town."
7	"Oaknapped!" (ポケモン捜査網！オーキド博士をさがせ!!, Pokémon Sōsa! Ōkido-hakase o Sagase!!; Pokémon Investigation! Search For Professor Okido!)	April 8, 2003
Butch and Cassidy kidnap Professor Oak in order to learn about Pokérus for Professor Nanba's evil plans, and Tracey and Ritchie have to rescue him.
8	"Big Meowth, Little Dreams" (迷探偵ニャース参上! / メイッコルリリは大迷惑, Meitantei Nyāsu Sanjō! / Meikko Ruriri daimeiwaku?; Calling Great Detective Nyarth / Ruriri the Niece is a Great Nuisance?)	June 17, 2003
With two days left in Big Town, Meowth gives up on his statue, and just wants to eat his tuna fish sandwich, which then mysteriously runs away from him. Then, the next day, he tries to woo a Skitty while the Pichu Brothers chase after an Azurill.
9	"A Date With Delcatty" (カスミ真剣勝負！命かけます!?, Kasumi Shinken Shōbu! Inochi Kakemasu!?; Kasumi Fights For Real! Risking A Life!?)	September 2, 2003
Casey visits Cerulean City to visit Misty and watch a baseball match with the Electabuzz. Meanwhile, Butch and Cassidy receive orders to steal the Delcatty of a trainer who also happens to have a crush on Misty and tickets to see the Electabuzz.
10	"Training Daze" (ロケット団 愛と青春の原点, Roketto-dan Ai to Seishun no Genten; Team Rocket! Origin of Love and Youth!)	September 30, 2003
Jessie recounts how she met up with James and Meowth, and how they became members of Team Rocket. Notable for the one of only three times that Butch is called by his proper name.
11	"Celebi and Joy!" (もうひとつのセレビィ伝説, Mō Hitotsu no Serebī Densetsu; Another Celebi Legend!)	October 7, 2003
Ritchie arrives in a town where the Mayor plans to demolish the Pokémon Center, but an old Nurse Joy does not want to lose the memories it contains. Celebi sends Ritchie back in time to make things right.
12	"Journey to the Starting Line!" (マサラタウン、ポケモントレーナーの旅立ち, Masara Taun, Pokémon Torēnā no Tabidachi!; Masara Town, A Pokémon Trainer Sets Off)	October 14, 2003
Ash's Tauros stampede through Professor Oak's lab causing a baby Bulbasaur, Squirtle, and Charmander to run away on the same day that the mayor's son, Gilbert, is about to start his Pokémon Journey.
13	"Putting The Air Back In Aerodactyl!" (ポケモン研究者シゲルと復活のプテラ, Pokémon Kenkyūsha Shigeru to Fukkatsu no Putera; Pokémon Researcher Shigeru & The Revived Ptera!)	March 16, 2004
Professor Oak and Tracey visit Gary, who is researching prehistoric Pokémon. They have successfully brought an Aerodactyl to life, but must gain control of it before anyone is endangered (or before Butch and Cassidy can steal it).Notable for the one of only three times that Butch is called by his proper name.
14	"Luvdisc Is A Many Splendored Thing!" (カスミとラブカス！ラブバトル!, Kasumi to Rabukasu! Rabu Batoru!; Kasumi and Lovecus! Love Battle!)	September 14, 2004
Misty and Daisy each have a new Luvdisc, but only one loves the other. To make matters worse, Butch and Cassidy steal them for Professor Nanba, who plans to use them to rid the world of love forever. Notable for the one of only three times that Butch is called by his proper name.
15	"Those Darn Electabuzz!" (ナナコとリザードン！炎の猛特訓!, Nanako to Rizādon! Honō no Mōtokkun!; Nanako & Lizardon! Intensive Fire Training!)	September 21, 2004
Casey meets the pitcher for her favourite baseball team, the Electabuzz. He left due to a shoulder injury, but has lost the fire to perform, while his Charizard has literally lost its fire and ability to fly. She must restore the fighting spirit to both of them.
16	"The Search for the Legend" (天駆ける伝説 ヒロシとファイヤー!, Amakakeru Densetsu Hiroshi to Faiyā!; Galloping Sky Legend – Hiroshi & Fire!!)	September 28, 2004
While taking a voyage on the SS Anne, Ritchie meets a trainer called Silver, who is on his way to battle Moltres with two Professors from the Bogus Fake University of Science. However, the "professors" are really Butch and Cassidy, and they want to capture Moltres for Team Rocket.

English version

EP#	Title	English air date
1	"The Legend of Thunder (Part 1)" (ライコウ 雷の伝説, Raikou – Ikazuchi no Densetsu; Raikou Legend of Thunder)	June 3, 2006
A three-part episode. On his Pokémon Journey, Jimmy meets his old friend, Marina, at a Pokémon Center. The two of them, later teaming up with Vincent, discover and attempt to foil an attempt by Hun and Attila to steal Raikou.
2	"The Legend of Thunder (Part 2)" (ライコウ 雷の伝説, Raikou – Ikazuchi no Densetsu; Raikou Legend of Thunder)	June 10, 2006
A three-part episode. On his Pokémon Journey, Jimmy meets his old friend, Marina, at a Pokémon Center. The two of them, later teaming up with Vincent, discover and attempt to foil an attempt by Hun and Attila to steal Raikou.
3	"The Legend of Thunder (Part 3)" (ライコウ 雷の伝説, Raikou – Ikazuchi no Densetsu; Raikou Legend of Thunder)	June 10, 2006
A three-part episode. On his Pokémon Journey, Jimmy meets his old friend, Marina, at a Pokémon Center. The two of them, later teaming up with Vincent, discover and attempt to foil an attempt by Hun and Attila to steal Raikou.
4	"Pikachu's Winter Vacation"	June 24, 2006
This episode is split into two parts: "Delibird's Dilemma" (デリバードのプレゼント, Deribādo no Purezento; Delibird's Present): Ash's, Misty's, and Brock's Pokémon must find Santa's missing presents before midnight.; "Snorlax Snowman" (ホワイトストーリー, Howaito Sutōrī; White Story): A retelling of Frosty the Snowman, starring the same Pokémon and featuring a Snorlax-shaped snowman.
5	"A Family That Battles Together Stays Together!" (タケシ！ニビジムをすくえ!, Takeshi! Nibi Jimu o Sukue!; Takeshi! Save Nibi Gym!)	July 1, 2006
Brock returns to Pewter City, but is shocked to discover that his mother has returned, and has turned the Pokémon Gym into a Water-type Gym. He now has to battle to save the Gym for his brother, Forrest.
6	"Cerulean Blues" (ハナダジムのリベンジマッチ!, Hanada Jimu no Ribenji Matchi!; Revenge Match at Hanada Gym!)	July 8, 2006
Misty returns home to become the leader of the Cerulean City Pokémon Gym, but has to deal with a number of problems that have cropped up during her absence, including a rampaging Gyarados and her rivals the Invincible Brothers seeking control of the Gym.
7	"We're No Angels!" (がんばれ！前向きロケット団, Ganbare! Maemuki Roketto-dan!; Tough Battle! Stay Positive, Team Rocket!)	July 15, 2006
Team Rocket lands in a village where they are mistaken for Team Righteous (a vintage TV superhero duo wearing identical uniforms), and face a dilemma deciding between building a robot army or living up to the high expectations of the villagers.
8	"Showdown at the Oak Corral" (オーキド邸だいけっせん!!, Ōkido-yashiki Daikessen!; Epic Battle at Okido's Lab)	July 22, 2006
Butch and Cassidy of Team Rocket break into Professor Oak's lab and steal all of the Poké Balls, so Ash's Pokémon have to get them back.
9	"The Blue Badge of Courage" (カスミ！ブルーバッジをゲットせよ!, Kasumi! Burū Bajji o Getto se yo!; Kasumi! Get the Blue Badge!)	July 22, 2006
Tracey and Sakura visit Misty at the Cerulean City Pokémon Gym, so that Sakura can battle Misty for a Gym Badge. Misty is out of Gym Badges, however, so the three of them travel to the home of the badge maker.
10	"Oaknapped!" (ポケモン捜査網！オーキド博士をさがせ!!, Pokémon Sōsa! Ōkido-hakase o Sagase!!; Pokémon Investigation! Search For Professor Okido!)	July 29, 2006
Butch and Cassidy kidnap Professor Oak in order to learn about Pokérus for Professor Nanba's evil plans, and Tracey and Ritchie have to rescue him.
11	"A Date With Delcatty" (カスミ真剣勝負！命かけます!?, Kasumi Shinken Shōbu! Inochi Kakemasu!?; Kasumi Fights For Real! Risking A Life!?)	August 5, 2006
Casey visits Cerulean City to visit Misty and watch a baseball match with the Electabuzz. Meanwhile, Butch and Cassidy receive orders to steal the Delcatty of a trainer who also happens to have a crush on Misty and tickets to see the Electabuzz.
12	"Celebi and Joy!" (もうひとつのセレビィ伝説, Mō Hitotsu no Serebī Densetsu; Another Celebi Legend!)	August 12, 2006
Ritchie arrives in a town where the Mayor plans to demolish the Pokémon Center, but an old Nurse Joy does not want to lose the memories it contains. Celebi sends Ritchie back in time to make things right.
13	"Training Daze" (ロケット団 愛と青春の原点, Roketto-dan Ai to Seishun no Genten; Team Rocket! Origin of Love and Youth!)	August 19, 2006
Jessie recounts how she met up with James and Meowth, and how they became members of Team Rocket. Notable for the one of only three times that Butch is called by his proper name.
14	"Journey to the Starting Line!" (マサラタウン、ポケモントレーナーの旅立ち, Masara Taun, Pokémon Torēnā no Tabidachi!; Masara Town, A Pokémon Trainer Sets Off)	August 26, 2006
Ash's Tauros stampede through Professor Oak's lab causing a baby Bulbasaur, Squirtle, and Charmander to run away on the same day that the mayor's son, Gilbert, is about to start his Pokémon Journey.
15	"Putting The Air Back In Aerodactyl!" (ポケモン研究者シゲルと復活のプテラ, Pokémon Kenkyūsha Shigeru to Fukkatsu no Putera; Pokémon Researcher Shigeru & The Revived Ptera!)	September 2, 2006
Professor Oak and Tracey visit Gary, who is researching prehistoric Pokémon. They have successfully brought an Aerodactyl to life, but must gain control of it before anyone is endangered (or before Butch and Cassidy can steal it). Notable for the one of only three times that Butch is called by his proper name.
16	"Luvdisc Is A Many Splendored Thing!" (カスミとラブカス！ラブバトル!, Kasumi to Rabukasu! Rabu Batoru!; Kasumi and Lovecus! Love Battle!)	September 23, 2006
Misty and Daisy each have a new Luvdisc, but only one loves the other. To make matters worse, Butch and Cassidy steal them for Professor Nanba, who plans to use them to rid the world of love forever. Notable for the one of only three times that Butch is called by his proper name.
17	"Those Darn Electabuzz!" (ナナコとリザードン！炎の猛特訓!, Nanako to Rizādon! Honō no Mōtokkun!; Nanako & Lizardon! Intensive Fire Training!)	September 23, 2006
Casey meets the pitcher for her favourite baseball team, the Electabuzz. He left due to a shoulder injury, but has lost the fire to perform, while his Charizard has literally lost its fire and ability to fly. She must restore the fighting spirit to both of them.
18	"The Search for the Legend" (天駆ける伝説 ヒロシとファイヤー!, Amakakeru Densetsu Hiroshi to Faiyā!; Galloping Sky Legend – Hiroshi & Fire!!)	September 30, 2006
While taking a voyage on the SS Anne, Ritchie meets a trainer called Silver, who is on his way to battle Moltres with two Professors from the Bogus Fake University of Science. However, the "professors" are really Butch and Cassidy, and they want to capture Moltres for Team Rocket.
19	"Of Meowth and Pokémon" (出会いのミレニアムタウン / アルバイトはたいへんニャース！？, Deai no Mireniamu Taun / Arubaito wa taihen Nyāsu!?; The Millennium Town Encounter! / Nyarth with a Part-Time Job!?)	October 7, 2006
Meowth takes a break from trying to capture Pikachu to spend time in Big Town. But his dream project to build a golden statue gets off to a bad start when he loses his picnic basket in a series of mix-ups. And then to pay for it he gets some jobs, but makes the Pichu possé to do the work. This story is continued in "Trouble In Big Town."
20	"Trouble in Big Town" (ぼくたちピチューブラザーズ・風船騒動, Bokutachi Pichū Burazāzu – Fūsen Sōdō; We're The Pichu Brothers: Balloon Disturbance)	October 14, 2006
When playtime turns into a fight, the Pichu Brothers get separated. Compounding this, Pichu Little is soon miles above the ground with only balloons on a string keeping him up, and a wild Murkrow bent on popping the balloons is flying around. This story is continued in "Big Meowth, Little Dreams."
21	"Big Meowth, Little Dreams" (迷探偵ニャース参上! / メイッコルリリは大迷惑, Meitantei Nyāsu Sanjō! / Meikko Ruriri daimeiwaku?; Calling Great Detective Nyarth / Ruriri the Niece is a Great Nuisance?)	October 21, 2006
With two days left in Big Town, Meowth gives up on his statue, and just wants to eat his tuna fish sandwich, which then mysteriously runs away from him. Then, the next day, he tries to woo a Skitty while the Pichu Brothers chase after an Azurill.
22	"Pikachu's Winter Vacation"	November 25, 2006
This episode is split into two parts: "Christmas Night" (クリスマスであそぼ!, Kurisumasu de Asobo!; Let's Play at Christmas!): Pikachu, Togepi, and more of Ash, Misty and Brock's Pokémon cause havoc on Christmas Eve.; "Kanga Games" (雪であそぼ!, Yuki de Asobo!; Let's Play in the Snow!): The Pokémon go exploring the mountain.

== Soundtrack ==
When shown on Shūkan Pokémon Hōsōkyoku, the episodes did not have a musical opening. Instead, they open with Brock and Misty talking (except for the Team Rocket episodes, where said characters would talk instead). Normally, it would result in Misty hitting Brock with a mallet, fan, or water gun for acting out of line. The endings would normally deal with that episode's character. When released on DVD these sequences were omitted entirely. The Japanese episodes were seen as special episodes, hence the unconventional opening. However, it was dubbed as a completely new series, so a musical opening was required. While the openings from the main series interlink scenes from the related Japanese opening with scenes from the episodes, there was no Japanese opening for Pokémon Chronicles, A new opening was created. Some of the scenes in the opening are taken from the Japanese Legend of Thunder opening, the rest are taken from episodes. There are 42 scenes in 36 seconds.

The ending is a repeat of the opening on the left of the screen, with the credits rolling past on the right. There are a few variations, however. The DVD version and first two parts of The Legend of Thunder shows footage from the battle at the start of Part Two. The ending for Pikachu's Winter Vacation on the DVD rolls over a full screen picture taken from the episode.

The original theme tune is a modified version of the "G/S Pokérap". However, there is an instrumental in the middle, where the narrator basically says what Chronicles is about:

Old friends!
New adventures!
Never before seen stories from the world of Pokémon!

When the series aired in America, starting with the second episode, the intro sequence was changed to a newer version, consisting of a montage of various scenes from "The Legend of Thunder" with more intense music. In the original of "The Legend of Thunder", it also features a cameo by the Johto rival, and later in another episode.

== DVD releases ==
The episodes have been released on DVD in a number of markets, excluding Region 1. English language releases are limited to Regions 2 and 4.

The complete series was released in the UK by Contender Entertainment Group in four volumes, released between 2005 and 2006. The first volume contained a feature-length version of The Legend of Thunder alongside the first Pikachu's Winter Vacation part, and "A Family That Battles Together Stays Together!". Volumes 2 and 3 were each combined into a single release and have five episodes each. Volume 4 contains seven episodes. A boxset containing the first three volumes was also released, but with slightly different packaging than the standalone creations. The DVDs do not contain any subtitles, or special features besides episode and scene selection.
