= Rikako Aikawa =

Japanese actress (born 1967)

- 愛河 里花子
- Born: Nahomi Kawazoe; October 7, 1967 (age 58); Yokohama, Kanagawa, Japan
- Other name: Nahomi Iwata
- Occupations: Actress; voice actress
- Years active: 1974–present
- Agent: Atomic Monkey
- Height: 152 cm (5 ft 0 in)
- Spouse: Mitsuo Iwata (m. 1992; div. 2025)
- Children: Anji Iwata (Voice actor)

Rikako Aikawa (愛河 里花子, Aikawa Rikako; born October 7, 1967) is a Japanese actress and voice actress affiliated with Atomic Monkey. She was born in Kanagawa Prefecture, Japan. She was originally a child actress. Her real name after she married Mitsuo Iwata, a Japanese voice actor, is Nahomi Iwata (岩田 菜穂美, Iwata Nahomi).

She appears in the Japanese and English-language versions of the Pokémon anime, voicing Ash's Caterpie, Metapod and Butterfree and his Krabby. She had a main role in the Orange League series where she voiced Ash's Lapras in both versions. She also appeared in the second Pokémon movie as the legendary Fire Pokémon, Moltres. She had a recurring role in the Johto series as Charla, Liza's female Charizard, a Pokémon who lives at the Charicific Valley and who eventually developed a romantic relationship with Ash's Charizard. She also played Madame Muchmoney's Granbull.

She is also known as a specialist of tongue-twisters in the Japanese language.

== Filmography ==
=== Television animation ===
Year	Title	Role(s)	Notes	Source
1992	Tomatoman	Tomatoman		
1993	Little Women II: Jo's Boys	Ned		
1996	Baby & Me	6-year-old boy B		
1997	Pokémon: Indigo League	Satoshi's Zenigame (Ash's Squirtle), Satoshi's Caterpie/Trancell/Butterfree (Ash's Caterpie/Metapod/Butterfree), Satoshi's Crab (Ash's Krabby), Kasumi's Koduck (Misty's Psyduck), Takeshi's Rokon (Brock's Vulpix) Kojiro's Utsobot (James' Victreebel)		
1997	Mashin Eiyuuden Wataru	Dodo		
1998	El Hazard: The Alternative World	Nahato		
1999	Pokémon: Adventures in the Orange Islands	Satoshi's Zenigame (Ash's Squirtle), Satoshi's Laplace (Ash's Lapras), Kasumi's Koduck (Misty's Psyduck), Takeshi's Rokon (Brock's Vulpix), Kenji's Kongpang (Tracey's Venonat, Kojiro's Utsobot (James' Victreebel)		
1999	Pokémon: The Johto Journeys	Satoshi's Zenigame (Ash's Squirtle), Satoshi's Laplace (Ash's Lapras), Kasumi's Koduck (Misty's Psyduck), Takeshi's Rokon (Brock's Vulpix), Kenji's Kongpang (Tracey's Venonat), Kojiro's Utsobot (James' Victreebel)		
1999	Black Heaven	Gen Tanaka		
1999	Seraphim Call	Misaki (ep 10)		
1999	Infinite Ryvius	Faina S Shinozaki, Nicks Chaiplapat		
1999	Wild Arms: Twilight Venom	Jiruja		
2000	Gate Keepers	Megumi Kurogane, Mieko Ikusawa		
2000	Hamtaro	Koushi-kun, Don-chan	Performed Intro	
2000	Brigadoon: Marin & Melan	Moto Asagi, Sumire Hanazono		
2000	Hiwou War Chronicles	Shishi		
2001	Motto! Ojamajo Doremi	Erika Tamaki		
2001	Haré+Guu	Hale		
2001	Steel Angel Kurumi 2	Kyanwan (Can-1)		
2002	Mirmo!	Nezumi / Rat (Golden Edition characters)		
2002	Jing: King of Bandits	Rum (ep 5)		
2002	Pokémon: Advanced Generation	Satoshi's Zenigame (Ash's Squirtle)		
2002	Pokémon Chronicles	Kasumi's Koduck (Misty's Psyduck)		
2003	Rumic Theater	Fuwa's neighbor (ep 5)		
2003	Planetes	Serie		
2004	Kaiketsu Zorori	Ishishi, unlisted credits		
2004	Mars Daybreak	Bon		
2005	MÄR	Bumoru, Halloween (young)		
2006	Wan Wan Serebu Soreyuke! Tetsunoshin	Mika		
2006	D.Gray-man	Cloud-shaped Akuma (ep 42)		
2006	Pururun! Shizuku-chan	Hababi-kun		
2006	Kenichi: The Mightiest Disciple	No. 20		
2007	Pururun! Shizuku-chan Aha	Hanaji-kun		
2007	Elec-king The Animation			
2008	To Love Ru	Stella (ep 10)		
2008	A Penguin's Troubles	Charlotte Takahashi		
2008	Live On Cardliver Kakeru	Hajime Kuroboshi, Sarusalsa		
2010	Panty & Stocking with Garterbelt	Monkey Ghost (episode 6)		
2011	Nichijou	narrator (episode 18)		
2011	You're Being Summoned, Azazel	Principal		
2012	Pokémon: Black & White: Rival Destinies	Kotetsu's Riolu/Lucario (Cameron's Riolu/Lucario)		
2013	Pokémon: Black & White: Adventures in Unova	Satoshi's Zenigame (Ash's Squirtle)		
2015	PriPara	Toriko		
2016	The Disastrous Life of Saiki K.	Kurumi Saiki		
2016	Pokémon the Series: Sun & Moon	Suiren's Ashimari (Lana's Popplio), Satoshi's Bevenom (Ash's Poipole), Tapu Koko		
2020	Motto! Majime ni Fumajime Kaiketsu Zorori	Ishishi		
2020	Healin' Good Pretty Cure	Mrs. Smith	Episode 17	
2021	To Your Eternity	Pioran		
2021	Muteking the Dancing Hero	Sara		
2024	Oblivion Battery	Kei's Mother		
2024	Chi's Sweet Summer Vacation	Champloo		
2027	Hirayasumi	Hanae Wada		

=== Animated Films ===
Year	Title	Role(s)	Notes	Source
1998	Pokémon: The First Movie	Satoshi's Zenigame (Ash's Squirtle), Kasumi's Koduck (Misty's Psyduck) Takeshi's Rokon (Brock's Vulpix)		
1999	Pokémon: The Movie 2000	Satoshi's Zenigame (Ash's Squirtle), Satoshi's Laplace (Ash's Lapras), Kasumi's Koduck (Misty's Psyduck), Kenji's Kongpang (Tracey's Venonat), Fire (Moltres)		
2000	Pokémon 3: The Movie	Kasumi's Koduck (Misty's Psyduck), Takeshi's Rokon (Brock's Vulpix)		
2001	Metropolis	Fifi		
2001	A Tree of Palme	Barron		
2001	Doraemon: Ganbare! Gian!!			
2001	Adventures in Ham-Ham Land	Koushi-kun		
2001	Pokémon 4Ever	Kasumi's Koduck (Misty's Psyduck)		
2002	Doraemon: Nobita in the Robot Kingdom	Onabe		
2002	Case Closed: The Phantom of Baker Street	Noboru Emori		
2002	Pokémon Heroes	Kasumi's Koduck (Misty's Psyduck)		
2002	The Captive Princess	Koushi-kun		
2003	Doraemon: Nobita and the Windmasters	Temjin		
2004	Hamtaro and the Demon of the Picture Book Tower	Koushi-kun		
2006	Paprika	Nobue Kakimoto		
2009	Astro Boy	Freezer		
2010	You are Umasou	Heart (Young)		
2012	Doraemon: Nobita and the Island of Miracles—Animal Adventure	Sky		
2013	Doraemon: Nobita's Secret Gadget Museum	Poppon		
2013	Pretty Cure All Stars New Stage 2: Friends of the Heart	Gureru		
2014	Pretty Cure All Stars New Stage 3: Eternal Friends	Gureru		
2017	Pokémon the Movie: I Choose You!	Satoshi's Caterpie/Trancell/Butterfree (Ash's Caterpie/Metapod/Butterfree)		

=== Original video animations ===
Year	Title	Role(s)	Notes	Source
1995	Princess Minerva	K2		
1995	El Hazard: The Magnificent World	Nahato		
1999	Sakura Wars 2	Tsuwako Tamazusa	(ep 3)	
1999	Pocket Monsters: Pikachu no Fuyuyasumi 2000	Psyduck, Vulpix, Squirtle		
2000	Pocket Monsters: Pikachu no Fuyuyasumi 2001	Aipom, Psyduck		
2002	Haré+Guu Deluxe	Hale		
2003	Jungle Wa Itsumo Hale Nochi Guu Final	Hale	Performed Theme Song	
2004	Mobile Suit Gundam Seed MSV Astray	8 (RED FRAME)	2004 Promo	
2004	Natsuiro no Sunadokei	Kawamura Mana		

=== Tokusatsu ===
- Kamen Rider J (1994 TV special) – Berry (voice)
  - Kamen Rider World (1994 TV special) – Berry (voice)
- Bakuryū Sentai Abaranger (CD Special) – Trinoid 23: Alohibiscuskunk (voice)
- Ohsama Sentai King-Ohger – Nagabajim (voice)

=== Video games ===
Year	Title	Role	Source
2002	Dark Chronicle	Shigū	
2002	Hourglass of Summer	Mana Kawamura	
2008	Super Smash Bros. Brawl	Squirtle	
2018	Super Smash Bros. Ultimate	Squirtle	

=== Dubbing roles ===
- A Cinderella Story – Fiona (Jennifer Coolidge)
- The Fifth Element (1999 NTV edition) – Leeloo (Milla Jovovich)
- Harry Potter and the Deathly Hallows – Part 2 – Helena Ravenclaw (Kelly Macdonald)
