= The Power of One (song) =

2000 single by Donna Summer

Single by Donna Summer

from the album Pokémon: The Movie 2000 Soundtrack
- B-side: "The Legend Comes to Life from 'The Power of One' Score" by Ralph Schuckett and John Loeffler
- Released: July 11, 2000
- Genre: soul; gospel
- Length: 3:50 (album version)
- Label: Atlantic
- Composers: Mervyn Warren; Mark Chait; Ralph Schuckett; John Loeffler
- Lyricists: Mervyn Warren; Mark Chait
- Producer: David Foster

Donna Summer singles chronology
"Love Is the Healer" (1999)	"The Power of One" (2000)	"You're So Beautiful" (2003)

"The Power of One" is a song by American singer-songwriter Donna Summer. It was composed by Mervyn Warren and Mark Chait and produced by David Foster. It served as the theme song for the American version of the movie Pokémon: The Movie 2000. Pokémon: The Movie 2000, subtitled The Power of One, premiered in mid-1999 in Japan and was the second feature-length film based on the Japanese Pokémon video game series. It was also heard in the trailers for all three of the Kids' WB-released films.

The song was released on July 11, 2000 by Atlantic Records as the first single from the Pokémon 2000 soundtrack album. "The Power of One" was included as track one on the soundtrack and was released as two different CD singles plus a cassette single in the United States. A number of dance remixes by Jonathan Peters and Tommy Musto were released on a CD maxi-single on October 31, 2000 from the same label and also issued on a 12-inch vinyl single. "The Power of One" became another dance success for Summer, peaking at number two on the US Billboard Dance Club Songs chart on the week of December 23, 2000 and peaking at number thirteen on the Dance Singles Sales chart on the week of November 18, 2000. There was no music video made for the song.

== Track listings ==
US CD and cassette single

1. Donna Summer: "The Power of One" (album version) – 3:50
2. Ralph Schuckett and John Loeffler: "The Legend Comes to Life from 'The Power of One' Score" (album version) – 4:15

US maxi-CD single

1. "The Power of One" (Jonathan Peters' club mix) – 8:18
2. "The Power of One" (Tommy Musto vocal mix) – 9:16
3. "The Power of One" (Jonathan Peters' Sound Factory club mix) – 10:21
4. "The Power of One" (Tommy Musto Gel dub) – 7:29

US 12-inch single

A1. "The Power of One" (Jonathan Peters' club mix) – 8:16
A2. "The Power of One" (Jonathan Peters radio mix) – 3:21
B1. "The Power of One" (Tommy Musto vocal mix) – 8:12
B2. "The Power of One" (Musto Beats) – 2:44

== Personnel ==
- David Foster – producer, arrangements
- Nathan DiGesare – co-producer, arrangements, synthesizer programming
- Bruce Sudano – co-producer
- Stewart Brawley – engineer
- Felipe Elgueta – engineer, additional synthesizer programming
- Dean Parks – acoustic guitar
- Steve Lukather – electric guitar
- Mick Guzauski – mixing

== Charts ==
Chart (2000)	Peak position
US Dance Club Songs (Billboard)	2
US Dance Singles Sales (Billboard)	13

== Legacy ==
Herman Cain, a former Republican candidate for President of the United States, quoted lines from the Donna Summer song multiple times throughout his campaign. He first used them in his official campaign announcement, mis-attributing them to the closing song of the 2000 Olympics. He made the same mistake at the Republican Leadership Conference in New Orleans on June 17, 2011. During an August debate, Cain again quoted the lyrics, this time attributing them to a poet. In a December interview with GQ, Cain acknowledged that the song came from a Pokémon film, but reiterated that he heard it during the close of the 2000 Olympics and stated that he had not previously known that it had originated in this film. However, "The Power of One" was not played during the Olympics' closing ceremony.

During Cain's announcement that he would be suspending his presidential campaign, he again quoted these lyrics, acknowledging that they came from a Pokémon movie.
