= Pokémon 3: The Movie =

2000 Japanese anime film directed by Kunihiko Yuyama

- Theatrical release poster

Japanese name
- Kanji: 劇場版ポケットモンスター 結晶塔の帝王 ENTEI
- Literal meaning: Pocket Monsters the Movie: Emperor of the Crystal Tower Entei
Transcriptions
- Revised Hepburn: Gekijō-ban Pokettomonsutā Kesshōtō no Teiō Entei
- Directed by: Kunihiko Yuyama
- Screenplay by: Takeshi Shudo; Hideki Sonoda
- Based on: Pokémon: The Johto Journeys by Satoshi Tajiri, & Nintendo
- Produced by: Choji Yoshikawa; Yukako Matsusako; Takemoto Mori
- Starring: Rica Matsumoto; Ikue Ōtani; Mayumi Iizuka; Yūji Ueda; Megumi Hayashibara; Shin-ichiro Miki; Inuko Inuyama; Yumi Tōma; Satomi Kōrogi; Unshō Ishizuka; Kōichi Yamadera; Naoto Takenaka; Hirohide Yakumaru; Ai Kato; Noriko Sakai
- Cinematography: Hisao Shirai
- Edited by: Toshio Henmi; Yutaka Ito
- Music by: Shinji Miyazaki
- Production company: OLM, Inc.
- Distributed by: Toho
- Release date: July 8, 2000 (Japan)
- Running time: 74 minutes
- Country: Japan
- Language: Japanese
- Budget: US$3–16 million
- Box office: US$68.5 million

Pokémon 3: The Movie (Note: Known in Japan as Pocket Monsters the Movie: Emperor of the Crystal Tower – ENTEI (Japanese: 劇場版ポケットモンスター 結晶塔の帝王 ENTEI, Hepburn: Gekijō-ban Pokettomonsutā Kesshōtō no Teiō Entei)) is a 2000 Japanese anime film directed by Kunihiko Yuyama as the third film in the Pokémon franchise. The film stars the voices of Rica Matsumoto, Ikue Ōtani, Mayumi Iizuka, Yūji Ueda, Megumi Hayashibara, Shin-ichiro Miki, Inuko Inuyama, Yumi Tōma, Satomi Kōrogi, Unshō Ishizuka, Kōichi Yamadera, Naoto Takenaka, Hirohide Yakumaru, and Ai Kato, and Noriko Sakai. In the film, Ash and his friends go on a journey to save young Molly Hale from an illusionary Pokémon named Entei.

This was the first Pokémon film to premiere in an IMAX theater. The realistic crystallization and Unown created a 3D effect in the film. This was also the last Pokémon film to be released internationally by Warner Bros. Pictures until the release of Pokémon: Detective Pikachu in 2019. The Japanese opening theme is OK! 2000 by Rica Matsumoto, and the Japanese ending theme is The Day a Rainbow Was Born (Niji ga Umareta hi) by Kumiko Mori. The English opening theme is Pokemon Johto by PJ Lequerica, and the English ending theme is To Know the Unknown by Innosense.

== Plot ==
In the town of Greenfield, research scientist Professor Spencer Hale conducts research on the elusive Pokémon Unown. He and his assistant, Skyler, discover a site of ruins, but Hale is sucked into the dimension of the Unown. His disappearance leaves his young daughter Molly alone, her mother having disappeared previously. Molly finds a box of tablets containing Unown images and begins assembling the letters, which summons the Unown themselves. The Unown, sensing Molly's desires, use their powers to make Molly's wishes come true, transforming her manor house into a crystal-like palace which spreads across the town and cuts her off from the world. An illusionary Entei is created to represent Molly's father, who agrees to fill this role for her.

Meanwhile, Ash Ketchum, Misty, and Brock meet and befriend a trainer named Lisa, arriving in Greenfield just in time to see the crystallization slowly in progress. They also meet up with Professor Oak and Ash's mom, Delia, who arrived to help with the situation, as the Ketchums are old friends of the Hales. However, Entei kidnaps Delia, following Molly's request for a mother as well, and he hypnotizes her into thinking she is Molly's mother. Ash, Misty, Brock, and their Pokémon head out to the mansion to save Delia, communicating with Oak and Skyler thanks to a PokéGear device given to them by Lisa. Team Rocket try investigating the mansion, but Entei blasts them into its depths. Molly watches Ash's Pokémon in action through a television and falls asleep, imagining herself being a Pokémon Trainer; Delia is snapped out of her trance by seeing Ash on the TV. Entei creates a dream version of Molly as an adult to let her battle the three, first fighting and defeating Brock with her stronger dream Pokémon, and then having a more friendly fight with Misty.

Ash locates Molly and Delia, attempting to convince Molly to leave with them, but she is too scared and refuses, causing the power of the Unown to fight back. Entei returns and battles Ash, defeating his Pokémon and nearly killing him and Pikachu. However, having witnessed the crisis on TV in Charicific Valley, Ash's Charizard appears in time to rescue Ash and Pikachu. Entei engages Charizard in a duel and eventually tries to kill him. But Molly, who realizes that her desires are causing more harm than good, tells Entei to stop fighting. She is finally convinced to let go of her pain and leave with them, as Entei reveals he will soon depart, having served his purpose to follow her wishes.

The Unown suddenly begin losing control of their powers and start to seal the group in the mansion. The group (plus Team Rocket) escape to the main hall where the Unown are. Pikachu and Charizard attempt to break the forcefield protecting the Unown, but they are unsuccessful, until they are joined by Entei, combining their powers to destroy the shield with Molly's support. Entei sacrifices himself and the Unown return to their dimension, reversing all of their effects on the world and returning Hale to the ruins where he originally vanished.

The group ventures outside, where Oak, Skyler, Lisa, and others meet them. Team Rocket hides in the mansion upon seeing the police outside and declare that they will always have another opportunity to catch Pokémon. Charizard and Lisa depart from Ash's company, and Molly reunites with her biological father, as well as with her long-lost biological mother.

== Cast ==
Character	Japanese	English
Ash Ketchum (Satoshi)	Rica Matsumoto	Veronica Taylor
Pikachu	Ikue Otani	Ikue Otani
Misty (Kasumi)	Mayumi Iizuka	Rachael Lillis
Brock (Takeshi)	Yuuji Ueda	Eric Stuart
Narrator	Unsho Ishizuka	Ken Gates
Togepi (Togepy)	Satomi Korogi	Satomi Korogi
Jessie (Musashi)	Megumi Hayashibara	Rachael Lillis
James (Kojiro)	Shin-ichiroh Miki	Eric Stuart
Meowth (Nyarth)	Inuko Inuyama	Maddie Blaustein
Entei	Naoto Takenaka	Dan Green
Spencer Hale (Sully Snowdon)	Naoto Takenaka	Dan Green
Molly Hale (Me Snowdon)	Akiko Yajima	Amy Birnbaum
Lisa (Rin)	Ai Kato	Lisa Ortiz
Schuyler (John)	Hirohide Yakumaru	Ted Lewis
Delia Ketchum (Hanako)	Masami Toyoshima	Veronica Taylor
Professor Samuel Oak (Dr. Yukinari Okido)	Unshō Ishizuka	Stuart Zagnit
Tracey Sketchit (Kenji)	Tomokazu Seki	Ted Lewis
Officer Jenny (Junsar)*	Chinami Nishimura	Lee Quick
David	Kōichi Yamadera	Peter R. Bird

- Officer Jenny has no lines in the film despite her prominence.

== Production ==
Pokémon 3: The Movie was directed by Kunihiko Yuyama and written by Takeshi Shudō and Hideki Sonoda, with animation production by OLM, Inc. Character designs were provided by Sayuri Ichiishi, Norihiro Matsubara and Hisashi Kagawa.

Originally Shudō proposed a different story for the third film, exploring the existence of real-world animals in the Pokémon universe. The concept involved the discovery of a fossilised Tyrannosaurus that would come to life and cause destruction across the Kanto region. After the proposal was rejected, Shudō developed the story that became Emperor of the Crystal Tower: Entei.

Shudō drew inspiration from his experiences as a father, particularly his relationship with his young daughter. He intended the film to explore the emotional relationship between fathers and daughters, and based the Japanese name of Molly (Mii) on his daughter's nickname. During production, Shudō experienced serious health problems and was hospitalised, leaving him unable to complete the screenplay. Sonoda subsequently took over the remaining writing duties.

== Release ==
=== Theatrical run ===
Pokémon 3: The Movie was released in Japanese theaters on July 8, 2000, by Toho. That following year, the English version, produced by Nintendo and 4Kids Entertainment and licensed by Warner Bros. Pictures under their Kids' WB/Warner Bros. Family Entertainment labels, was released in North America on April 6, 2001. The events of the film take place at the end of the third season of Pokémon: The Johto Journeys.

=== Home media ===
In Japan, the film was released on VHS on 7 February 2001, followed by a DVD release on 7 July 2001. The Japanese DVD included the accompanying short film Pikachu & Pichu, Japanese and English audio tracks, and trailers for both the Japanese and American theatrical releases.

In North America, Warner Home Video released Pokémon 3: The Movie on VHS and DVD on 21 August 2001.

On 9 February 2016, Viz Media released the film on Blu-ray in North America as part of the Pokémon: The Movies 1–3 Steelbook Blu-ray Collection, alongside the first two films. A corresponding British SteelBook edition was released by Manga Entertainment on 14 November 2016.

== Reception ==
=== Box office ===
Like its predecessors, for the film's theatrical release, select theaters would give away exclusive Pokémon trading cards, to capitalize on the success of the trading card game.

Pokémon 3: The Movie opened in theaters in Japan on July 8, 2000, with a 74-minute running time. The film was the third highest-grossing film in Japan for the year behind Mission: Impossible 2 and The Green Mile, with a gross of US$48.5 million.

The film was released in the United States on April 6, 2001, debuting at number 4 on its opening weekend, earning $8,240,752 from 2,675 theaters, less than half as much as first-place finisher Spy Kids. The film proved less successful in the box office compared to previous films. During its 10-week box office run, Pokémon 3: The Movie made a significant profit-margin, grossing $17,052,128 in North America.

The film grossed US$4,605,214 in five other countries, including US$2,736,100 in Germany, US$714,016 in the United Kingdom, US$549,902 in Australia, US$327,752 in Austria, and US$277,444 in Denmark. Combined, the film grossed US$21,657,342 overseas outside of Japan. In total, the film's gross was US$70,157,342 (equivalent to $131,163,726 in 2025).

=== Home video sales ===
The VHS release topped Billboard's Top VHS Sales chart for two consecutive weeks in September 2001. In the United Kingdom, the film debuted at number three on the Official Video Chart for the week of 14 October 2001.

=== Critical response ===
The review aggregator website Rotten Tomatoes reported that 20% of critics have given the film a positive review based on 55 reviews, with an average rating of 4.01/10. The website's critics consensus reads, "Critics say that the third Pokémon movie has a better plot than its two predecessors. This is not enough, however, to recommend it to those not already fans of the franchise." On Metacritic, the film has a weighted average score of 22 out of 100 based on 18 critics, indicating "generally unfavorable reviews". Audiences polled by CinemaScore gave the film an average grade of "A−" on an A+ to F scale.

== Soundtrack ==
Pokémon 3: The Ultimate Soundtrack

Soundtrack album by Various artists
- Released: April 3, 2001
- Genre: Pop
- Length: 57:00
- Label: Koch Records
- Producer: John Loeffler

Pokémon 3: The Ultimate Soundtrack is the soundtrack to the third series and the movie, It was released on April 3, 2001, by Koch Records on Audio CD and Compact Cassette. Many of the songs were featured on the album Totally Pokémon but as that was not released outside of North America and Australia, this soundtrack encouraged European fans to own the music. In Australia, some copies of the CD were released with a bonus disc of the musical score album for Pokémon: The Movie 2000 (which was also released as a separate disc worldwide). The Japanese and English-language editions contained different tracks. Shinji Miyazaki wrote the original film score, while Ralph Schuckett composed the score for the International and Japanese DVD releases.

The second track, "To Know the Unknown", was performed by girl group Innosense. Tracks 13 to 15 were karaoke versions. The album also features two Pokémon videos, the Pokérap and a scene from the film, which are accessible upon insertion of the disc into a computer.

=== Track listing ===
No.	Title	Writer(s)	Artist(s)	Length
1.	"Pokémon Johto" (Movie Version)	Neil Jason; John Loeffler; John Siegler	Élan Luz Rivera feat. PJ Lequerica	3:32
2.	"To Know the Unknown"	Norman J. Grossfeld; John Loeffler; John Siegler	Innosense	3:33
3.	"Pikachu (I Choose You)"	Neil Jason; John Loeffler	Élan Luz Rivera	4:07
4.	"All We Wanna Do"	Ken Cummings; John Loeffler	Élan Luz Rivera feat. Jamily Gray	4:01
5.	"He Drives Me Crazy"	Ken Cummings; John Loeffler	Shauna McCoy	3:32
6.	"You & Me & Pokémon"	Neil Jason; John Loeffler; John Siegler	Élan Luz Rivera feat. PJ Lequerica	4:08
7.	"Song of Jigglypuff"	Louis Cortelezzi; John Loeffler; Bob Mayo	Jamily Gray feat. Shauna McCoy	4:22
8.	"Pokerap GS"	John Loeffler; John Siegler	Jolan Boockvor; Jamily Gray; PJ Lequerica; Shauna McCoy; Shareef McQueen; Élan Luz Rivera	4:16
9.	"Two Perfect Girls"	Norman J. Grossfeld; John Loeffler; John Siegler	Eric Stuart	3:39
10.	"Pokémon Johto" (TV Version)	John Loeffler; John Siegler	PJ Lequerica	2:54
11.	"Biggest Part of My Life"	Ken Cummings; John Loeffler	PJ Lequerica	2:46
12.	"Medley from Spell of the Unown"	John Loeffler; Ralph Schuckett		3:25
13.	"Pikachu (I Choose You)" (Karaoke Version)			4:07
14.	"Song of Jigglypuff" (Karaoke Version)			4:23
15.	"You & Me & Pokémon" (Karaoke Version)			4:08

== See also ==
- List of films based on video games
