= Norman J. Grossfeld =

American television producer

- Born: December 15, 1963 (age 62); New York City, New York, U.S.
- Education: New York University – Tisch School of the Arts
- Occupations: Television executive, record producer, director, producer and screenwriter
- Known for: Pokémon; Yu-Gi-Oh!

Norman J. Grossfeld (born December 15, 1963) is an American director, television producer, record producer, screenwriter and media executive. From February 1994 to December 2009, he was the president of 4Kids Productions, a former subsidiary of 4Kids Entertainment and Leisure Concepts. He produced the English adaptations of the first eight seasons of the Pokémon TV series and five seasons of Yu-Gi-Oh!. He produced five seasons of the new Teenage Mutant Ninja Turtles, five Pokémon movies, and one Yu-Gi-Oh! movie for 4Kids TV. In addition to producing and executive producing, Grossfeld co-wrote most of the Pokémon films, which grossed over $600 million worldwide. Grossfeld is credited with writing the Pokémon franchise's tagline, "Gotta catch 'em all!" He was also an executive producer for the anime One Piece.

An accomplished lyricist and musician, Grossfeld contributed to several tracks on the Pokémon 2.B.A. Master soundtrack album, the first released for the English localization of the Pokémon anime. The album was a commercial success, rising to the top of the US Billboard Kids Albums Chart and garnering RIAA Gold certification with over 500,000 units sold. He also wrote both the main and ending theme songs for Sonic X and Kirby: Right Back at Ya!, and the English ending theme song to Pokémon: Jirachi, Wish Maker.

Grossfeld also developed and co-wrote the successful stage adaptation of the Pokémon series, which premiered at Radio City Music Hall and toured the United States and Canada in late 2000 to early 2001.

Before his role as president of 4Kids, Grossfeld was a producer and director at Television Programming Enterprises from 1988 to 1991, worked at NBC Sports from 1991 to 1992 as a coordinating director, and spent 1992 through 1994 as president of the television production company Gold Coast Television Entertainment.

Grossfeld broke new ground in reality television with NBC's InSport, a show that set the stage for sports magazine series now on the air. Grossfeld has also produced, written and/or directed a variety of television programs, including Lifestyles of the Rich and Famous hosted by Robin Leach.

A member of the Directors Guild of America, Grossfeld directed coverage of several Olympic Games for NBC, including the 1992 Summer Olympics in Barcelona, the 1996 Summer Olympics in Atlanta and the 1998 Winter Olympics in Nagano. In 1996, Grossfeld won the International Olympic Committee's highest honor, the Golden Rings, for his direction of the live sports coverage of the 1996 Olympic Games.

Grossfeld is of Jewish background.

== Filmography ==
=== Movies ===
Year	Title	Role
1999	Pokémon: The First Movie	Writer, producer
2000	Pokémon: The Movie 2000	Writer, producer
2001	Pokémon 3: The Movie	Writer, producer
2002	Pokémon 4Ever	Writer, executive producer
2003	Pokémon Heroes	Executive producer
2004	Pokémon: Jirachi, Wish Maker	Writer, producer, ending theme songwriter
2004	Yu-Gi-Oh! The Movie: Pyramid of Light	Writer, executive producer
2005	Pokémon: Destiny Deoxys	Writer, producer

=== Television ===
Year	Title	Role
1986	Fame, Fortune & Romance	Director
1987	Runaway With the Rich and Famous	Director
1988	Rich and Famous 1988 World's Best	Associate producer
1988	Masters of the Martial Arts Presented by Wesley Snipes	Writer
1993	Campbell's Portrait of a Teacher	Field producer
1995	WMAC Masters	Executive producer
1998	Pokémon	Writer, executive producer, songwriter
2001	Cubix	Writer, executive producer, theme songwriter
2001	Yu-Gi-Oh!	Executive producer, songwriter
2002	Kirby: Right Back at Ya!	Executive producer, theme songwriter
2002	Ultimate Muscle	Executive producer, theme songwriter
2003	Sonic X	Executive producer, theme songwriter
2003	Teenage Mutant Ninja Turtles	Executive producer, theme songwriter
2004	One Piece	Executive producer
2005	Winx Club	Executive producer
2006-09	Viva Piñata	Executive producer
2008	Adventures in Voice Acting	Interviewee

== See also ==
- Alfred R. Kahn
