= Pokémon 2.B.A. Master =

Pokémon 2.B.A. Master: Music From the Hit TV Series

Soundtrack album by Various artists
- Released: June 29, 1999
- Recorded: 1997–1999
- Genre: Pop
- Length: 48:24
- Label: Koch Records
- Producer: John Loeffler

Professional ratings
Review scores
| Source | Rating |
|---|---|
| AllMusic | 3/5 stars |

Pokémon 2.B.A. Master: Music From the Hit TV Series is the first soundtrack album released for the English localisation of the Pokémon anime. It was released by Koch Records on June 29, 1999.

== Production ==
In an interview with producer John Loeffler, it was revealed that it took three and a half weeks to produce the album.

== Reception ==
Pokémon 2.B.A. Master was certified gold by the Recording Industry Association of America (RIAA) on October 18, 1999, for selling 500,000 copies. As of May 2003, the album has sold over three million copies worldwide.

== In popular culture ==
- Shortened versions of the songs "2.B.A. Master," "Double Trouble (Team Rocket)," "My Best Friends," "Together Forever," "Viridian City," and "What Kind of Pokémon Are You?" are played in the "Pikachu's Jukebox" segment during the show's first two seasons.
- Instrumental versions of the album's songs make up the soundtrack to the 2000 video game Pokémon Puzzle League.
- Various songs from the album were used in the musical Pokémon Live!
- Comedian and video producer Brian David Gilbert created and performed a rewritten and extended Pokérap, including a vast majority of Pokémon from every generation that had been released at the time. He described this theatrical piece as a "Gesamtkunstwerk".

== Track listing ==
| No. | Title | Writer(s) | Producer(s) | Length |
|---|---|---|---|---|
| 1. | "Pokémon Theme" (Jason Paige) | John Siegler; John Loeffler | Loeffler; Siegler (co.) | 3:17 |
| 2. | "2.B.A. Master" (Russell Velázquez) | Russell Velázquez; Loeffler | Velázquez | 4:03 |
| 3. | "Viridian City" (Jason Paige) | Neil Jason; Loeffler | Loeffler; Jason (co.) | 3:29 |
| 4. | "What Kind of Pokémon Are You?" (Joshua Tyler) | Siegler; Loeffler; Norman Grossfeld | Loeffler; Siegler (co.) | 3:40 |
| 5. | "My Best Friends" (Ray Greene) | Michael Whalen | Whalen | 3:29 |
| 6. | "Everything Changes" (Sheila Brody) | Ken Cummings; Loeffler | Loeffler; Cummings (co.) | 4:40 |
| 7. | "The Time Has Come (Pikachu's Goodbye)" (Marti Lebow) | Siegler; Loeffler; Grossfeld | Loeffler; Siegler (co.) | 3:05 |
| 8. | "Pokémon (Dance Mix)" (Vicki Sue Robinson) | Siegler; Loeffler | Loeffler; Siegler (co.) | 3:53 |
| 9. | "Double Trouble (Team Rocket)" (Rachael Lillis as Jessie, Eric Stuart as James, Maddie Blaustein as Meowth & Ted Lewis as Giovanni) | Louis Cortelezzi; Bob Mayo; Loeffler | Loeffler; Cortelezzi (co.) | 3:52 |
| 10. | "Together Forever" (J. P. Hartmann) | Cummings; Loeffler | Loeffler; Cummings (co.) | 3:55 |
| 11. | "Misty's Song" (Yvette Laboy) | Cummings; Loeffler | Loeffler; Cummings (co.) | 4:42 |
| 12. | "PokéRAP" (James "D Train" Williams & Babi Floyd) | Siegler; Loeffler | Loeffler; Siegler (co.) | 3:02 |
| 13. | "You Can Do It (If You Really Try)" (John Loeffler) | Siegler; Loeffler; Grossfeld | Loeffler; Siegler (co.) | 3:09 |
| Total length: | | | | 48:24 |

== Personnel ==
- Larry Alexander – engineer, mixing
- Joe Barbaria – engineer
- Andre Betts – rap vocals (3)
- Maddie Blaustein – lead vocals (9)
- Sheila Brody – lead vocals (6)
- Sharon Bryant – background vocals (4, 6, 9–11, 13)
- Bruce Buchanan – engineer, mixing
- Larry Campbell – guitar (13)
- Elaine Caswell – background vocals (3, 6, 10, 11)
- Vivian Cherry – background vocals (3)
- Dennis Collins – background vocals (13)
- Louis Cortelezzi – background vocals (1, 8, 9, 12), soprano saxophone (13), arranger (9)
- Ken Cummings – background vocals (1, 6, 8, 10–12), arranger (6, 10, 11)
- Babi Floyd – lead vocals (13)
- Ray Greene – lead and background vocals (5)
- Norman Grossfeld – executive producer for 4Kids Productions
- J. P. Hartmann – lead vocals (10)
- Neil Jason – background vocals and arranger (3)
- Premananda Johannes – congas (8)
- Alfred R. Kahn – executive producer
- Curtis King – background vocals (8, 9)
- Yvette Laboy – lead vocals (11)
- Marti Lebow – lead vocals (7)
- Ted Lewis – lead vocals (9)
- Rachael Lillis – lead vocals (9)
- Frank Lloyd – background vocals (3)
- John Loeffler – producer for Rave Music, lead vocals (13), background vocals (1, 4, 8, 12, 13)
- Kati Mac – background vocals (1, 4)
- Eleanor Matera – production coordinator
- Bob Mayo – guitar (9)
- John McCurry – electric guitar (3)
- Cindy Mizelle – background vocals (13)
- Jason Paige – lead vocals (1, 3), background vocals (1)
- Vicki Sue Robinson – lead and background vocals (8)
- David Rolfe – guitar (1)
- Paul Rowan – Pro-Tools 4 editing, assistant engineer
- Rick Rowe (Media Force) – mastering
- Larry Saltzman – guitar (1, 4, 7–9)
- Julian Schwartz – Pro-Tools 4 editing, assistant engineer
- Glen Sherman – guitar (6, 10, 11)
- John Siegler – arranger (1, 4, 7, 8, 12, 13)
- Paul Special – engineer
- Eric Stuart – lead vocals (9)
- Joshua Tyler – lead vocals (4)
- Erika Velázquez – background vocals (2)
- Jake Velázquez – background vocals (2)
- Russell Velázquez – lead vocals and arranger (2), rap vocals (4), background vocals (4, 6, 8–11)
- Michael Whalen – background vocals and arranger (5)
- James "D Train" Williams – lead vocals (12), background vocals (12, 13)
- Darcell Wilson – background vocals (5)

== Chart performance ==
=== Weekly charts ===
| Chart (1999–2000) | Peak position |
|---|---|
| Australian Albums Chart | 20 |
| Austrian Albums Chart | 3 |
| Dutch Albums Chart | 86 |
| Hungarian album chart | 5 |
| New Zealand Albums Chart | 50 |
| US Billboard 200 | 90 |
| US Billboard Kid Albums | 1 |

=== Year-end charts ===
| Chart (1999) | Position |
|---|---|
| US Billboard Kid Albums | 1 |

| Chart (2000) | Position |
|---|---|
| US Billboard Kid Albums | 7 |

== Sales and certifications ==
| Region | Certification | Certified units/sales |
|---|---|---|
| Argentina (CAPIF) | Gold | 30,000^{^} |
| Australia (ARIA) | Gold | 35,000^{^} |
| Austria (IFPI Austria) German version titled "Schnapp' sie Dir alle!" | Platinum | 50,000^{*} |
| Brazil (Pro-Música Brasil) | Gold | 100,000^{*} |
| Canada (Music Canada) | Platinum | 100,000^{^} |
| France (SNEP) | 2× Gold | 200,000^{*} |
| Germany (BVMI) German version titled "Schnapp' sie Dir alle!" | 3× Gold | 750,000^{^} |
| Switzerland (IFPI Switzerland) German version titled "Schnapp' sie Dir alle!" | Platinum | 50,000^{^} |
| United Kingdom (BPI) | Silver | 60,000^{^} |
| United States (RIAA) | Gold | 500,000^{^} |
^{*} Sales figures based on certification alone.^{^} Shipments figures based on certification alone.
