= Psyduck =

Pokémon species

- Pokémon character
- Psyduck artwork by Ken Sugimori
- First game: Pokémon Red and Blue (1996)
- Designed by: Ken Sugimori (finalized)
- Voiced by: English: Michael Haigney (1998-2006); Michele Knotz (since 2006); Japanese: Rikako Aikawa

In-universe information
- Species: Pokémon
- Type: Water

Psyduck (/ˈsaɪdʌk/), known as Koduck (コダック, Kodakku) in Japan, is a Pokémon species in Nintendo and Game Freak's Pokémon franchise. Created by Ken Sugimori, Psyduck first appeared in the video games Pokémon Red and Blue and later in sequels. It has later appeared in various merchandise, spinoff titles and animated and printed adaptations of the franchise. A Psyduck also appears as part of the main cast in the live-action animated film Pokémon Detective Pikachu. Psyduck has been voiced by Michael Haigney and Rikako Aikawa since its debut.

A duck-like Pokémon, Psyduck is constantly stunned by its headache, and usually just stands vacantly, trying to calm itself. In the anime series, Psyduck's appearances became a running gag; Misty, a major supporting character, would often release Psyduck by accident instead of the Pokémon she wanted to use. Psyduck has been met with a primarily positive response since its debut, primarily in its role in the Pokémon Concierge television series.

== Design and characteristics ==
Psyduck is a species of fictional creatures called Pokémon created for the Pokémon media franchise. Developed by Game Freak and published by Nintendo, the Japanese franchise began in 1996 with the video games Pokémon Red and Green for the Game Boy, which were later released in North America as Pokémon Red and Blue in 1998. In these games and their sequels, the player assumes the role of a Trainer whose goal is to capture and use the creatures' special abilities to combat other Pokémon. Some Pokémon can transform into stronger species through a process called evolution via various means, such as exposure to specific items. Each Pokémon has one or two elemental types, which define its advantages and disadvantages when battling other Pokémon. A major goal in each game is to complete the Pokédex, a comprehensive Pokémon encyclopedia, by capturing, evolving, and trading with other Trainers to obtain individuals from all Pokémon species.

Introduced in Red and Blue, the design started as pixel art sprites by the development team first, with a single color identity chosen to work within the Super Game Boy hardware limitations. While conceived as a group effort by multiple developers at Game Freak, the finalized design and artwork was done by Ken Sugimori. Originally tasked with drawing the characters to illustrate a planned strategy guide by Game Freak when the games released, Sugimori drew all the sprites for the game in his style to not only unify their designs visually but also modify any design elements he felt were amiss, while trying to retain the original sprite artists' unique styles. Originally called "Koduck" in Japanese, Nintendo decided to give the various Pokémon species "clever and descriptive names" related to their appearance or features when translating the game for western audiences as a means to make the characters more relatable to American children. As a result, they were renamed "Psyduck", a combination of the words "psychic" and "duck".

Psyduck is constantly stunned by its headache, and usually just stands there vacantly, trying to calm its headache. When the headache gets too bad, its brain cells awaken, allowing it to use strong psychic powers. Psyduck is classified in-game as a Water-type Pokémon. When a Psyduck receives enough experience from battles, it evolves into Golduck. During the initial pitch of the 2019 film Detective Pikachu, writers Benji Samit and Dan Hernandez stated that they wanted Psyduck in the film, citing that this was because it was "their favorite." Hernandez stated that "Because I'm a neurotic writer, I really relate to getting stressed and more stressed and more stressed and then just exploding... and for that reason, I've always felt a great kinship to Psyduck, so we thought that was really important to get him in there." Psyduck was also initially planned to be one of the cover mascots of the Pokémon, Let's Go! games, though it was ultimately scrapped due to Eevee's popularity and Psyduck's yellow color scheme clashing with the other decided mascot, Pikachu. Psyduck has been voiced by Michael Haigney in English and by Rikako Aikawa in Japanese.

== Appearances ==
Psyduck made its debut appearance in the Pokémon video game series in Pokémon Red and Blue, before later appearing in all mainline entries in the series. It has since gone to make a variety of appearances in spin-off games, such as the Pokémon Snap series, the Pokémon Mystery Dungeon series, Pokémon Go, and the Pokémon Rumble series.

In the Pokémon anime, Misty, a major supporting character in the series, has a Psyduck that she accidentally caught, serving as a constant source of frustration for her, as it frequently emerges to attempt to battle the opponent in substitution of the Pokémon she intends to use, and in instances where she does intend to use it, it often does not act. When its headache gets bad enough, it has been shown to use phenomenally powerful Psychic-type moves which far exceed its perceived potential. As such, it often acts as comic relief within the anime. Psyduck have appeared at various points in the Pokémon Adventures manga. Psyduck appears in the 2019 film Pokémon Detective Pikachu as the partner to the female lead of the film, junior unpaid reporter Lucy Stevens (portrayed by Kathryn Newton). It also appears in the 2023 animated series Pokémon Concierge, in which a shy Psyduck is a wild Pokémon in the Pokémon Resort, an island where Pokémon come to visit and relax. It ends up befriending the protagonist, Haru, and the two become close friends.

== Promotion and reception ==
The relationship between Pokémon Concierge's protagonist, Haru, and Psyduck was the subject of significant commentary.

Psyduck has appeared in multiple pieces of merchandise, including plush toys, battery-powered toys, pins, and cards in the Pokémon Trading Card Game. Zavvi has launched licensed T-shirts featuring Psyduck and other popular generation I species. Psyduck-inspired cast necklaces have also been available in Japan. The first Pokémon Jet, a Boeing 747-400D for All Nippon Airways, has Psyduck and nine other Pokémon on its livery. A life-sized Psyduck plush was released by The Pokemon Company in 2020, later being rereleased in 2023.

Described as "silly" by GameSpy and The New York Times, Psyduck has been well received by the media, identified as one of the most popular characters in the original games by GamesRadar+ and Kotaku. Psyduck is Pokémon developer Junichi Masuda's favorite Pokémon. GameDaily staff felt it was among the more unique Pokémon designs, while IGN felt it was a cult favorite among fans due to its "bizarre, bewildered appearance." Alex Walker of Kotaku highlighted it as a relatable character, also citing its role as comic relief in the Pokémon anime. It was also cited as a favorite character by IGN staff. The Coventry Evening Telegraph also praised its design, stating the character was "more interesting" in comparison to more commonly seen Pokémon such as Squirtle, though James Stephanie Sterling of Destructoid was more critical, calling it "annoying" and "irritating." Psyduck has also been criticized for alleged associations to the occult. Author Cindy Jacobs criticized Psyduck's alleged occult powers, while Pastor Phil Arms discussed how its psychic powers allegedly reflected "New Age" ideas of altered states of consciousness.

Psyduck's appearance in Pokémon Concierge has been received positively. James Whitbrook, writing for Gizmodo, found Psyduck and its relationship with the show's protagonist, Haru, a relatable centerpiece of the show. He highlighted their relationship as a relatable and welcoming message. Jade King, writing for TheGamer, found Psyduck's role and emotions in the show akin to feelings of social anxiety, and praised the messages delivered by Psyduck overcoming its own anxieties to befriend Haru. Ana Diaz, writing for Polygon, also praised Psyduck's role in the show, stating that "Every scene with Psyduck is like viewing a brief, but fleeting moment of pure, unadulterated thoughtless bliss." She also highlighted how the show helped portray Psyduck in a more positive light, primarily in comparison in its role in the Pokémon anime series. Emma Stefansky, writing for The Atlantic, cited similar sentiments, stating that the series "wisely recognizes the dramatic potential of Psyduck." She highlighted the usage of Psyduck, primarily used as comic relief, as a relatable figure in the series. Actress Rena Nōnen, who played Haru in the series, cited that it had become her favorite Pokemon as a result of the series.
