= Pokémon: Adventures in the Orange Islands =

Second season of the Pokémon animated television series

- Season 2
- English DVD cover
- No. of episodes: 36

Release
- Original network: TV Tokyo
- Original release: January 28 – October 7, 1999

Season chronology
- ← Previous; Indigo League Next → The Johto Journeys

Pokémon: Adventures in the Orange Islands (Note: originally aired simply as Pokémon) is the second season of the Pokémon anime series and the final season of Pokémon the Series: The Beginning, known in Japan as Pocket Monsters (ポケットモンスター, Poketto Monsutā). (Note: For the DVD release, the title was changed to Pocket Monsters: Episode Orange Archipelago (ポケットモンスター：オレンジ諸島編, Poketto Monsutā: Orenji Shotō Hen)) It originally aired in Japan from January 28 to October 7, 1999, on TV Tokyo, and in the United States from December 4, 1999, to October 14, 2000, on The WB/Kids' WB.

The season follows Ash Ketchum as he travels across the Orange Islands to challenge its Pokémon League while joined by Misty and Tracey Sketchit, a Pokémon Watcher.

The episodes were directed by Masamitsu Hidaka and produced by the animation studio Oriental Light and Magic.

== Episode list ==
Jap. overall	Eng. overall	No. in season	English title Japanese title	Original release date	English air date
83	81	1	"Pallet Party Panic" (Masara Town! Setting off on a New Journey); Transliteration: "Masara Taun! Aratanaru Tabidachi!" (Japanese: マサラタウン! あらたなるたびだち!)	January 28, 1999	December 4, 1999
Ash celebrates making it to the Kanto League Indigo Plateau Conference back at Pallet Town. However, Team Rocket members steals Pikachu by tricking them with a very spicy meal, but unlucky for them they're defeated by the anger of Ash's disobeying Charizard, but only after Ash's Pidgeotto is poisoned. Later on, Professor Oak asks Ash to go to Valencia Island to bring a mysterious Pokéball, the GS Ball, from Professor Philena Ivy. Ash prepares for his journey to Valencia Island, when they are attacked by a group of Spearow led by a very angry Fearow. Ash realizes that the Spearow Ash threw the rock at in the beginning of his quest has since evolved into a Fearow, and soon carries Ash and Pikachu away, where they discover that a flock of Pidgey and Pidgeotto are being threatened by the Spearow flock. Ash sends his Pidgeotto to guide them to safety, but is almost easily defeated by Fearow. Determined to never give up and help Ash, Ash's Pidgeotto evolves into Pidgeot and accompanies Ash, Pikachu and the Pidgey and Pidgeotto flock to defeat Fearow. Ash subsequently releases Pidgeot to lead and protect the Pidgey and Pidgeotto flock from Fearow and the Spearow flock.
84	82	2	"A Scare in the Air" (The Airship Hardship!?); Transliteration: "Hikōsen wa Fukōsen!?" (Japanese: ひこうせんはふこうせん!?)	February 4, 1999	January 8, 2000
Heading to the Valencia Island, Ash takes part in a lottery and wins a blimp ride to get there; however, the Blimp turns out to be a haunted vehicle controlled by Team Rocket. However, Misty realizes that Togepi disappears and the heroes try to find it, without knowing that Jigglypuff is on the Blimp.
85	83	3	"Pokéball Peril" (Southern Pokémon and the GS Ball); Transliteration: "Nangoku Pokemon to GS Bōru" (Japanese: なんごくポケモンとGSボール)	February 11, 1999	January 15, 2000
Ash and his friends are on Valencia Island searching for Professor Ivy, so they can receive the mysterious GS Ball. They find Professor Ivy's Pokémon Laboratory where the professor shows them the GS Ball. As the ball cannot not be opened or transported, Ash and his friends are tasked with returning the GS ball to Professor Oak for examination. Brock decides to stay on the island with Professor Ivy so that he can learn about Pokémon. Ash and Misty leave without Brock and board a dirigible airship but encounter Team Rocket. In the end, Jigglypuff suddenly appears and sings. Team Rocket and Jigglypuff exit the blimp while the blimp crash lands on Tangelo Island.
86	84	4	"The Lost Lapras" (Save Laplace!); Transliteration: "Rapurasu o Tasukero!" (Japanese: ラプラスをたすけろ!)	February 18, 1999	January 22, 2000
While exploring the island they crash-landed on, Ash and Misty discover a group of teenagers bullying a Lapras. Despite the bullies being driven away, the Lapras which is only a baby is refusing to let any humans near it and the pressure increases when Team Rocket arrive, intending to steal the Lapras, forcing Ash, Misty and their new friend, Tracey Sketchit, to give chase and save the Lapras before it's too late.
87	85	5	"Fit to Be Tide" (Orange League! Natsukan Gym!); Transliteration: "Orenji Rīgu! Natsukan Jimu!" (Japanese: オレンジリーグ! ナツカンジム!)	February 25, 1999	February 5, 2000
Having caught Lapras, Ash along with Misty and Tracey have embarked on a journey of exploring the Orange Islands as Ash plans to enter the Orange League. The group's first stop is Mikan Island where Ash finds the Mikan Island Gym Leader, Cissy, and discovers that the Mikan Island Gym structure is very different from the one he's used to seeing in his native region.
88	86	6	"Pikachu Re-Volts" (The Mystery of the Missing Pokémon!); Transliteration: "Kieta Pokemon-tachi no Nazo!" (Japanese: きえたポケモンたちのナゾ!)	March 4, 1999	February 5, 2000
Butch and Cassidy attempt to control Pokémon with a large antenna sending out signals from Drowzee. This causes Ash's Pikachu, Misty's Togepi, and all of Jessie and James' Pokémon to turn against their masters because of the effects. They're going to have to team up to save their Pokémon, during which Togepi learns Metronome from Drowzee.
89	87	7	"The Crystal Onix" (The Crystal Iwark); Transliteration: "Kurisutaru no Iwāku" (Japanese: クリスタルのイワーク)	March 11, 1999	February 5, 2000
While out at sea, Ash and his friends find a message in a bottle from Marissa of Sunburst Island asking if anyone knows about an Onix made out of crystal. Curious, they help Marissa and her brother Mateo to find the Crystal Onix and to capture it.
90	88	8	"In the Pink" (The Island of Pink Pokémon); Transliteration: "Pinku no Pokemon-jima" (Japanese: ピンクのポケモンじま)	March 18, 1999	February 12, 2000
After getting caught in some whirlpools, Ash and his friends get washed up on Pinkan Island, a special Pokémon Reserve which contains Pokémon that are only of the color, pink. However, Team Rocket also get washed up on this island and start causing problems.
91	89	9	"Shell Shock" (The Secret of the Kabuto Fossils!); Transliteration: "Kabuto no Kaseki no Himitsu!" (Japanese: カブトのかせきのひみつ!)	March 25, 1999	March 4, 2000
After following some boats to an island, Ash and his friends discover an excavation, the whole island is made of fossilized Kabuto, however according to the legend, the Kabuto are said to awaken and unleash destruction on the island.
92	90	10	"Stage Fight!" (Dance! Pokémon Showboat!); Transliteration: "Odoru! Pokémon Shōbōto!" (Japanese: おどる! ポケモンショーボート!)	April 1, 1999	February 12, 2000
After arriving on another island, Ash and his friends discover a showboat which has many talking Pokémon on it. Finding out they do performances, Ash and the gang decide to sit and watch it, but Team Rocket arrives to steal the rare talking Pokémon. This episode was banned but it was dubbed into English. Note: Jynx with Blackface makes an appearance in this episode, so this episode was banned.
93	91	11	"Bye Bye Psyduck" (Goodbye Koduck! Come Back Golduck?); Transliteration: "Sayonara Kodakku! Mata Kite Gorudakku?" (Japanese: さよならコダック! またきてゴルダック?)	April 8, 1999	February 26, 2000
After stopping on another island to rest, Misty notices her Psyduck's tail is glowing, a nearby trainer named Marina says it may mean it is time for it to evolve. So Misty challenges her to battle and when she finds she has a Golduck, she easily beats the trainer. However, Team Rocket has other plans. Later, Golduck turns out to be a wild Pokémon as Misty's Psyduck had only slept in its Pokéball.
94	92	12	"The Joy of Pokémon" (Sailing Joy! Cross the Raging Waves!); Transliteration: "Seiringu Jōi! Aranami o Koete!" (Japanese: セイリングジョーイ! あらなみをこえて!)	April 15, 1999	March 4, 2000
Ash and his friends meet a muscle-tanned Nurse Joy who does not run a Pokémon Center of her own but instead travels between islands on the archipelago which are too small to have a Pokémon Center on them and heals sick Pokémon. Ash and his friends decide to help Nurse Joy.
95	93	13	"Navel Maneuvers" (Navel Gym! Snowy Mountain Battle!); Transliteration: "Nēburu Jimu! Yuki Yama no Tatakai!" (Japanese: ネーブルジム! ゆきやまのたたかい!)	April 22, 1999	March 11, 2000
The group arrive on Navel Island where Ash finds himself up against the Navel Island Gym Leader, Danny, as Ash competes for his second Gym Badge. Misty attempts to tempt Ash by showing a more caring attitude to Danny. Causing Ash to gets jealous and angry.
96	94	14	"Snack Attack" (Gluttonous Kabigon! Huge Panic!); Transliteration: "Ōgui Kabigon! Dai Panikku!" (Japanese: おおぐいカビゴン! だいパニック!)	April 29, 1999	March 25, 2000
Arriving on the Grapefruit Islands, Ash discovers that there is a Snorlax going from island to island and Snorlax was responsible for eating all the grapefruits. Ash is employed to help stop the greedy Snorlax, but the Snorlax proves to be slippery. Later on, with the help of Jigglypuff, Ash captures the sleeping Snorlax.
97	95	15	"A Shipful of Shivers" (Ghost Ship and Ghost Pokémon!); Transliteration: "Yūreisen to Yūrei Pokemon!" (Japanese: ゆうれいせんとゆうれいポケモン!)	May 6, 1999	March 25, 2000
Arriving on Moro Island, Ash and his friends hear about a long-lost Winner's Trophy being found on a sunken ship, but when Team Rocket steals it, Ash and the gang follow them to a ghost ship inhabited by Gastly and Haunter.
98	96	16	"Meowth Rules!" (Lord Nyarth's Island!?); Transliteration: "O Nyāsu-sama no Shima!?" (Japanese: おニャースさまのしま!?)	May 13, 1999	March 25, 2000
Meowth finds himself on an island where the inhabitants believe him to be the "Great Meowth of Bounty".
99	97	17	"Tracey Gets Bugged" (The Strike Soldier's Pride); Transliteration: "Sutoraiku Senshi no Hokori" (Japanese: ストライクせんしのほこり)	May 20, 1999	April 1, 2000
Arriving on Murcott Island, Ash and his friends discover a wounded Scyther. After capturing it, Tracey must take it to a Pokémon Center. While there, he discovers the Scyther got dethroned from being in charge of his group.
100	98	18	"A Way Off Day Off" (It's a Southern Island! Everyone Assemble!); Transliteration: "Minami no Shima da yo! Zen'in Shūgō!" (Japanese: みなみのしまだよ! ぜんいんしゅうごう!)	May 27, 1999	April 8, 2000
Deciding to take a break on a nearby island, Ash, his friends, and all their Pokémon just use the time to relax and get better acquainted. However, Team Rocket has other plans for the Pokémon and intend to steal them.
101	99	19	"The Mandarin Island Miss Match" (Elite Four Canna! Ice Battle!!); Transliteration: "Shitennō Kanna! Kōri no Tatakai!!" (Japanese: してんのうカンナ! こおりのたたかい!!)	June 3, 1999	April 15, 2000
The group descend on Mandarin Island where Ash's arrogance emerges due to the fact that he's won every single battle he's had since arriving on the island. But upon meeting Prima (aka Lorelei), the Kanto Elite Four member, and challenging her to a battle, Ash starts to realize that he may have made a grave mistake. Just like "Stage Fight". Note: This episode was banned due to Jynx with Blackface making an appearance.
102	100	20	"Wherefore Art Thou, Pokémon" (Nidoran's Love Story); Transliteration: "Nidoran no Koimonogatari" (Japanese: ニドランのこいものがたり)	June 10, 1999	April 22, 2000
Still on Mandarin Island, Ash and his friends go through Victorian Town where they find two Nidoran who are in love with each other but any possible hint of a relationship is being derailed by the trainers who happen to be childhood rivals.
103	101	21	"Get Along, Little Pokémon" (Coil on the Prairie!); Transliteration: "Daiheigen no Koiru-tachi!" (Japanese: だいへいげんのコイルたち!)	June 17, 1999	April 29, 2000
Ash and his friends discover a man who has troops of Magnemite and has to take them to a town on the island in order to give it power. However, he is injured, so it is up to Ash to herd up the Magnemite and bring them to the town.
104	102	22	"The Mystery Menace" (Monster in the Sewers!?); Transliteration: "Chikadō no Kaibutsu!?" (Japanese: ちかどうのかいぶつ!?)	June 24, 1999	May 6, 2000
Heading to the other end of Mandarin Island and the city of Trovitopolis, Ash and his friends discover there's a monster in the sewer who causes many problems in the town. When the Mayor wants to blow it up, Nurse Joy protests and asks Ash and company to help.
105	103	23	"Misty Meets Her Match" (Yuzu Gym! Type Battle 3 vs. 3!!); Transliteration: "Yuzu Jimu! Taipu Batoru San Tai San!!" (Japanese: ユズジム! タイプバトル3VS3!!)	July 1, 1999	September 9, 2000
Ash arrives on Trovita Island prepared to battle for his third Gym Badge. However, much to Ash's dismay, the Trovita Island Gym Leader, Rudy, has more than just battling on his mind, Rudy develops a crush on Misty, much to Ash's jealous and anger once again. Rudy moves in to court Misty after she helps rescue his younger sister, Mahri. While Ash battles for the Spike Shell Badge, Misty considers the tempting offer to stay on the island with Rudy and Mahri forever. Later, Rudy understands that Misty wants to go with Ash. In the end, Rudy compliments that Ash is lucky before they say their goodbyes.
106	104	24	"Bound for Trouble" (Pikachu vs. Nyarth!?); Transliteration: "Pikachū Tai Nyāsu!?" (Japanese: ピカチュウVSニャース!?)	July 15, 1999	September 15, 2000
After getting his third Gym Badge, Ash and his friends arrive on an island, where Pikachu is soon captured by Team Rocket and is chained to Meowth. But soon after Pikachu and Meowth are taken away by a giant Pidgeot, the trapped rivals eventually learn how to get along.
107	105	25	"Charizard Chills" (Lizardon! I Choose You!!); Transliteration: "Rizādon! Kimi ni Kimeta!!" (Japanese: リザードン! きみにきめた!!)	July 22, 1999	September 2, 2000
Ash, Tracey, and Misty are sailing along on Lapras when they almost crash into another Pokémon trainer wanting to battle Ash. This trainer heard about Ash from the Trovita Island gym leader and wants to put his Pokémon up against Ash's. When the new trainer uses a super-powerful Poliwrath on Charizard, it's more than anyone expects. After Charizard gets frozen in a battle, Ash tries to defrost him. Charizard, still distrusting of Ash, doesn't want his help, but Ash keeps trying. Charizard finally decides to obey and respect Ash as not only his trainer but also his real friend, and the two become closer than ever at the end! After saving Pikachu from Team Rocket with Charizard's help, Ash is able to give a stunning defeat to the Poliwrath as revenge that froze Charizard earlier.
108	106	26	"The Pokémon Water War" (Firefighting Showdown! Zenigame vs. Kameil); Transliteration: "Hikeshi Taiketsu! Zenigame Tai Kamēru" (Japanese: ひけしたいけつ! ゼニガメVSカメール)	July 29, 1999	August 26, 2000
On the next island, Ash and his friends see a team of firefighters consisting of Squirtle, Wartortle, and Blastoise. Eager to test its skills, Ash's Squirtle gets to train with them. But when an actual fire turns up, training has to become reality.
109	107	27	"Pokémon Food Fight" (Burn! Kabigon!!); Transliteration: "Moe yo! Kabigon!!" (Japanese: もえよ! カビゴン!!)	August 5, 1999	August 19, 2000
While in a battle, Ash accidentally breaks Snorlax's Pokéball. With the Pokémon Center on the other side of the island, Ash and his friends have to get Snorlax there. And to make matters worse, Team Rocket arrive and are hoarding the island's food ransom until they get Pikachu.
110	108	28	"Pokémon Double Trouble" (Tag Battle! The Last Gym!!); Transliteration: "Taggu Batoru! Saigo no Jimu!!" (Japanese: タッグバトル! さいごのジム!!)	August 12, 1999	September 9, 2000
On Kumquat Island, Ash discovers Luana, the Kumquat Island Gym Leader, who mistakes him for her son with a Pikachu. After defending the island from Team Rocket, they head to the Kumquat Gym to have a Double Battle where Ash's Pikachu and Charizard battle against Luana's Marowak and Alakazam but Pikachu's and Charizard's unwillingness to work together might end up costing Ash his chance of qualifying for the Orange League.
111	109	29	"The Wacky Watcher!" (Koiking! The Secret of Evolution!!); Transliteration: "Koikingu! Shinka no Himitsu!!" (Japanese: コイキング! しんかのひみつ!!)	August 19, 1999	September 16, 2000
On Rind Island, Tracey meets Dr. Quackenpoker, a noted Pokémon Watcher who is doing a study on Magikarp and how they evolve into Gyarados. However, Team Rocket appears to steal the Magikarp and get them to evolve.
112	110	30	"The Stun Spore Detour" (Nyoromo and Kasumi); Transliteration: "Nyoromo to Kasumi" (Japanese: ニョロモとカスミ)	August 26, 1999	September 16, 2000
On a tiny island, Ash and Tracey get affected by a Stun Spore from a Vileplume, leaving it up to Misty to get an antidote to heal them. Can Misty find it with the help of her new Poliwag?
113	111	31	"Hello, Pummelo!" (Winner's Cup! Full Battle 6 vs. 6!!); Transliteration: "Wināzu Kappu! Furu Batoru Roku Tai Roku!!" (Japanese: ウィナーズカップ! フルバトル6VS6!!)	September 2, 1999	September 23, 2000
Having finally arrived on Pummelo Island, Ash finally gets the chance to battle the Orange Crew Supreme Gym Leader Drake in a full six-on-six Pokémon Battle, only to discover that the battle may prove to be the toughest one he's ever had.
114	112	32	"Enter the Dragonite" (Final Battle! Kairyu Appears!!); Transliteration: "Fainaru Batoru! Kairyū Tōjō!!" (Japanese: ファイナルバトル! カイリューとうじょう!!)	September 9, 1999	September 23, 2000
Ash continues his fight against Drake in hopes of win the Winner's Trophy and earning the register in the Orange League Hall of Fame but things hit a snag when Drake brings out his sixth and final Pokémon; the undefeated Dragonite, whose overwhelming strength and powerful attacks are a force to be reckoned with. Ash will have to give it his all if he is to win against the undefeated Drake.
115	113	33	"Viva Las Lapras" (Goodbye Laplace!); Transliteration: "Sayonara Rapurasu!" (Japanese: さよならラプラス!)	September 16, 1999	September 30, 2000
Having been become Orange League Champion after winning his full battle against Drake, Ash and the team are heading back to Pallet Town in Kanto, but their plans get derailed when Lapras finally discovers its family, only for everyone to realize that Lapras's pack want nothing to do with Ash's Lapras, now that it has gotten involved with humans. Ash, Misty, and Tracey soon learn that a group of pirates and their Tentacruel are attacking Lapras's group and when the bullying starts up again, with Tracey having gone to alert Officer Jenny, Ash and Misty decide to get into the fight, vowing to stop the pirates once and for all.
116	114	34	"The Underground Round-Up" (Big Marumine Explosion!?); Transliteration: "Marumain Dai Bakuha!?" (Japanese: マルマインだいばくは!?)	September 23, 1999	September 30, 2000
Having to travel by boat, Ash and his friends arrive on Hamlin Island, their final stop before returning to Kanto to discover that the town is being attacked by hundreds of Electrode and a only Voltorb. A man named Poncho is trying to stop them with his Dugtrio and a group of Diglett.
117	115	35	"A Tent Situation" (Return to Masara Town!); Transliteration: "Kaettekita Masara Taun!" (Japanese: かえってきたマサラタウン!)	September 30, 1999	October 7, 2000
Ash and his friends are back in Pallet Town, but upon their arrival, they discover that Brock is back and he won't explain why he left Valencia Island. However, as usual, Team Rocket try to steal all of the Pokémon in Professor Oak's lab by vacuuming all the Pokéballs, including the GS Ball that Professor Oak was working on. Can they get it back?
118	116	36	"The Rivalry Revival" (Rival Showdown! Satoshi vs. Shigeru!!); Transliteration: "Raibaru Taiketsu! Satoshi Tai Shigeru!!" (Japanese: ライバルたいけつ! サトシVSシゲル!!)	October 7, 1999	October 14, 2000
After Gary saves the day against Team Rocket, Ash decides to challenge him where his Pikachu is against Gary's Eevee. However, Gary wins the Pokémon battle. Ash is depressed by losing against his rival, but goes to follow Gary to Johto region in order to ultimalety beat him once and for all. Tracey decides to stay in Pallet Town, so he can be Professor Oak's assistant. In the end, Brock rejoins the group and they head off to the Johto region.

== Music ==
The Japanese opening song is "The Rivals" (ライバル！, Raibaru) by Rica Matsumoto for all 36 episodes. The ending songs are "Type: Wild" (タイプ：ワイルド, Taipu: Wairudo) by Rica Matsumoto for 24 episodes, "Pokémon March" (ポケモン音頭, Pokémon Ondo) by Sachiko Kobayashi, Unshō Ishizuka and Kōichi Sakaguchi with an interlude by Shimai Niitsu for 1 episode, "Riding on Lapras" (ラプラスにのって, Rapurasu ni Notte) by Mayumi Iizuka and Rikako Aikawa for 12 episodes, and the English opening songs are "Pokémon Theme" by Jason Paige for 3 episodes. Its shortened version serves as the ending theme, and "Pokémon World" by Russell Velázquez for 33 episodes and for all 36 episodes. Its shortened version serves as the ending theme. The ending songs at the end of the episode are "My Best Friends" by Michael Whalen for 6 episodes, "Double Trouble" by Rachael Lillis, Eric Stuart, and Maddie Blaustein for 6 episodes, "What Kind of Pokémon Are You?" by Joshua Tyler for 4 episodes, "Together Forever" by J.P. Hartmann for 7 episodes, "2.B.A. Master" by Russell Velázquez for 9 episodes, and "Viridian City" by Jason Paige for 7 episodes from Pikachu's Jukebox. Johto predicted the English version of "Type: Wild", the ending song from Pokémon Encore performed by Robbie Danzie.

== Home media releases ==
In the United States, the entire season was released on three 12-episode DVD volume sets in 2002 and 2003 by Viz Video and Ventura Distribution.

Viz Media released a box set containing all three DVDs in 2008.

Viz Media and Warner Home Video released Pokémon: Adventures in the Orange Islands – The Complete Collection on DVD in the United States on October 11, 2016.

Older home video releases refer to the season as Pokémon: Adventures on the Orange Islands. Newer DVD releases and the official Pokémon website refer to the season as Pokémon: Adventures in the Orange Islands.
