= Mayumi Iizuka =

Japanese actress (born 1977)

- 飯塚 雅弓
- Born: January 3, 1977 (age 49); Tokyo, Japan
- Other names: Hoshi Mai (星 舞); Maitan (まいたん); Māchan (まーちゃん)
- Education: Hosei University
- Occupations: Actress; voice actress; singer; DJ
- Years active: 1981–present
- Agent: Across Entertainment
- Notable credits: Pokémon as Kasumi (Misty); Tenchi in Tokyo as Sakuya Kumashiro; Kanon as Makoto Sawatari; Mega Man Legends and Marvel vs. Capcom series as Tron Bonne
- Height: 148 cm (4 ft 10 in)
- Website: berrysmile.net

Mayumi Iizuka (飯塚 雅弓, Iizuka Mayumi; born January 3, 1977) is a Japanese actress, voice actress, singer and disc jockey who was born in Tokyo. She is currently affiliated with Across Entertainment and her label is Lantis. She is an instructor at the Stay Luck training school Follow-Up. For her singing activities, she uses the alias Hoshi Mai (星 舞).

Her well-known roles as a voice actress include Kasumi (Misty) in the Pokémon series, Tron Bonne in the Mega Man Legends series and Claiomh Everlasting in the Sorcerous Stabber Orphen series.

== Biography ==
Iizuka gained fame as an advocate for Gyaru fashion movement, wearing Gal-style clothing in public, and for her music releases, often in music videos and for album cover on CD releases. She is known for her style as a white gal (白ギャル, Shiro Gyaru).

== Career ==
In 1980, at the age of three, Iizuka joined Theater Company Wakakusa through an acquaintance of her grandfather. The reason she joined the group was to learn etiquette. The company was stricter about greetings and etiquette than her lessons, and she remembers crying when she was told off. The following year, on January 11, 1981, she made her debut as a child actress playing the role of Tomiko in the TV drama Haru no Urara no Monogatari (TBS Television Toshiba Sunday Theater). At Theater Company Wakakusa, she was taught to "keep showing people what only you can do," and even as a child, she spent her days desperately trying to achieve her dreams.

In 1983, due to her father's job transfer, she moved to Taichung City, Taiwan from the first grade to the fifth grade, during which time she took a break from performing. When she returned to Japan in 1989, she resumed her performing career with the same Theater Company Wakakusa. She had always personally wanted to return, and when she was in her fifth year back in Japan, she decided she will think about things in her own way and do her best in this world. In an interview in 2008, she said that she could not have done it alone to come this far, and she wanted to express her gratitude to her parents, grandfather, and family.

When Iizuka first resumed her activities, things did not go as she had hoped, and she often failed at auditions and didn't have any luck in getting roles. In fact, she was one of the last people to audition for the Wakaokusama wa Udemakuri! but she was not selected. It was to her chagrin that she was finally selected to play the role of a friend, and she recalls in her blog that it was a fun experience. At that time, Midori Yaegaki, the representative of the company at that time, told her that it was her own power that brought her luck, and she realized that it was no good to be weak and that she had to attract luck herself, and after she started to audition in that way, her appearances in dramas gradually increased.

In 1991, she made her voice acting debut as Tsuneko Tani in the movie Only Yesterday. The audition for the film was the first time she auditioned for voice acting, and at that time she had almost no experience with voice acting auditions, causing her anxiety due to not having the know-how, but she was full of desire to try it.

In 1993, Iizuka moved to Yaegaki Office, a directly managed production company of Theater Company Wakakusa. There were no senior members of her office who had debuted as voice actors, and her manager did not know what kind of scenes she would be in, so she often went to dub shows by herself. Although she lacked confidence, she went to the recording sessions with the feeling that her performances would be accepted there. From the age of 19, she began working more and more on TV anime series and OVAs, and from then on, her main activity was as a voice actress, but she still appears on stage and continues to work as an actress.

In 1997, she became widely known for her role as Kasumi in Pokémon. When she was in college, she was thinking of quitting if she didn't find a job that satisfied her by the time she graduated, and that is when she came across the role of Kasumi. Since then, she has expanded her activities and made her debut as a singer with the release of her album Kataomoi (Pioneer LDC) on August 27. In addition, she became the main personality for her first show "Weekly Animage: Mayumi Iizuka's It's Still Sunday!" which was aired from October 12, and started her career as a radio personality. In an interview in 2008, she commented that her world has expanded and that made her realize that there is more than one dream.

In 1998, Iizuka performed her first concert, "VOICE ANIMAGE Presents Mayumi Iizuka First Concert" at Hall A, Tokyo International Forum. In mid-August 2010, she attended the 2010 Shenyang 2nd Anime and Computer Game Expo in Shenyang, China, and gave a small live performance and a speech in Chinese.

On February 28, 2014, she left Yaegaki Office and moved to Kenyu Office on March 1, 2014. On September 1, 2017, she moved from Kenyu Office to Across Entertainment.

== Filmography ==
=== Television animation ===
- Akahori Gedou Hour Rabuge (Anne Ante Hime [ep12-13])
- Asobotto Senki Gokū (Suzie)
- Buzzer Beater 2005 and 2007 (Eddie)
- Chance: Triangle Session (Akari Mizushima)
- Doki Doki! PreCure (Cure Empress)
- Fancy Lala (Anna Nozaki)
- Fresh Pretty Cure! (Miyuki Chinen)
- Futari wa Pretty Cure (Yuka Odajima [ep16])
- Gate Keepers (Reiko Asagiri)
- Glass Mask 2005 (Mai Asou)
- Haunted Junction (Kagamiko)
- Heat Guy J (Rumi)
- I'm Gonna Be An Angel! (Miruru)
- Jing: King of Bandits (Stir)
- Kaginado (Makoto Sawatari)
- Kanon 2002 and 2006 (Makoto Sawatari)
- Kindaichi Case Files (Reika Hayami)
- Magic User's Club (Nanaka Nakatomi)
- Pocket Monsters (Kasumi)
- Pocket Monsters: Episode Orange Archipelago (Kasumi)
- Pocket Monsters: Episode Gold & Silver (Kasumi)
- Mewtwo! I Am Here (Kasumi)
- Pocket Monsters Side Stories (Kasumi)
- Pocket Monsters: Advanced Generation (Kasumi)
- The Mastermind of Mirage Pokémon (Kasumi)
- Pocket Monsters: Best Wishes! Season 2: Episode N (Kasumi)
- Pocket Monsters: Sun & Moon (Kasumi)
- Pocket Monsters (Kasumi)
- Nagasarete Airantō (Panako)
- Princess Nine (Yoko Tokashiki)
- Shikabane Hime: Aka (Kun Osaki [ep4])
- Sorcerous Stabber Orphen (Cleao Everlasting)
- St. Luminous Mission High School (Noriko Kijima)
- Star Ocean EX (Rena Lanford)
- Tenchi in Tokyo (Sakuya Kumashiro)
- To Heart (Aoi Matsubara)
- Tokyo Underground (Rayon)
- UFO Ultramaiden Valkyrie (Raine)
- Violinist of Hameln (Flute)
- Virus Buster Serge (Erika Tinen)
- The Vision of Escaflowne (Yukari Uchida, Millerna Aston)
- Weiß Kreuz (Kaori)
- xxxHolic (Mie [ep13])
- You're Under Arrest! second season (Saori Saga)

=== Original video animations (OVAs) ===
- Geobreeders (Maya)
- Glass Mask (Sayaka Minazuki)
- Hyper Doll (Mew Fumizuki)
- Slayers Excellent (Marty Lenford)
- Tenbatsu! Angel Rabbie (Lasty Farson)
- You're Under Arrest! No Mercy! (Sally)

=== Theatrical animation ===
- Catnapped! (Chuchu)
- Detective Conan: Quarter of Silence (Fuyumi Tachihara)
- Doraemon: Nobita's Great Battle of the Mermaid King (Haribo)
- Doraemon: Nobita and the Legend of the Sun King (Kuku)
- Escaflowne (Sora, Yukari Uchida)
- Junkers Come Here (Kazuko)
- Only Yesterday (Tsuneko Tani)
- Pocket Monsters films (Kasumi)
- Whisper of the Heart (Kinuyo)

=== Video games ===
- Atelier series (Mysterious trilogy) (Leon/Amelia Leonmeyer)
- Gate Keepers (Reiko Asagiri)
- Gyakuten Saiban series (Chihiro Ayasato)
- Kanon (Makoto Sawatari)
- Marvel vs. Capcom 2: New Age of Heroes (Tron Bonne, Sonson)
- Marvel vs. Capcom 3: Fate of Two Worlds (Tron Bonne)
- The Misadventures of Tron Bonne (Tron Bonne)
- Namco × Capcom (Tron Bonne)
- One: Kagayaku Kisetsu e (Mizuka Nagamori)
- Pokken Tournament (Alyssa)
- Project X Zone (Tron Bonne)
- Rockman DASH (Tron Bonne)
- Rockman DASH 2 (Tron Bonne)
- Sorcerous Stabber Orphen (Cleao Everlasting)
- Super Robot Taisen OG Saga: Endless Frontier (Kyon Feulion, Koma)
- Super Smash Bros. Brawl (Jirachi)
- To Heart (Aoi Matsubara)
- True Love Story 2 (Sanae Miyama)
- Ultimate Marvel vs. Capcom 3 (Tron Bonne)

=== Dubbing ===
- Gunman in Joseon (Jung Soo-in (Nam Sang-mi))
- The Magician (Cheong-myeong (Go Ara))

== Discography (as a singer) ==
All of her songs were sung in the Japanese language.

=== Singles ===
1. Accele (アクセル / Accele < Accelerator), 1997
2. Love Letter, 1999
3. Heart no Tsubasa 2000
4. Caress/Place to Be, 2000
5. My Wish, 2000
6. Yasashi Migite (やさしい右手 / A Tender Right Hand), 2002
7. Koi no Iro (恋の色 / Color of Love), 2002
8. Kikaseteyo Kimi no Koe (聴かせてよ君の声 / Give Me the Sound of Your Voice), 2002
9. Pure, 2003
10. TRUST - Kimi to Aruku Mirai - (TRUST～君と歩く未来～ / TRUST - Future, Walking with You -), 2011 - Online download only

=== Albums (full-length) ===
1. Kataomoi (かたおもい / The Unrequited Love), 1997
2. Mint to Kuchibue (ミントと口笛 / Mint and a Whistle), 1998
3. =So Loving, 1999
4. Aeris, 2000
5. Himawari (ひまわり / Sunflowers), 2001
6. Niji no Saku Basho (虹の咲く場所 / A Place in the Bloom of a Rainbow), 2002
7. Smile×Smile, 2003 - Produced by Tore Johansson
8. Infinity, 2004
9. Mine, 2005
10. 10Love, 2006
11. Crystal Days, 2007
12. Stories, 2008
13. Fight!!, 2009
14. Kimi e... (君へ。。。 / To You...), 2009
15. Ichigo. (Mayumi Iizuka album)|Ichigo.]] (いちご。 / Strawberry.), 2012

=== Mini-albums ===
1. Fly Ladybird Fly, 1998
2. 23Degrees, 2004
3. Purezento (プレゼント / The Present), 2005

=== Best-of albums ===
1. Berry Best, 2001
2. Bestrawberry, 2005
