= John Loeffler =

American music executive and composer

- Born: June 3, 1951 (age 75)
- Occupations: Music Executive, Singer, Songwriter, Producer
- Years active: 1979–present
- Label: BMG / Fieldhouse-Music / Rave Music

John Loeffler (born June 3, 1951) is an American music industry executive and executive vice president, head of New York repertoire and marketing for BMG.

In 2019, Loeffler's output included new releases from John Fogerty, The Allman Betts Band feat. Devon Allman and Duane Betts, Marc Cohn and Blind Boys of Alabama, Perry Farrell, Sophie Auster, Jesse Colin Young and Stephen Bishop.

Prior to being named EVP in January 2019 he served as executive director of global development for BMG and developed joint ventures with music and media companies beyond traditional music platforms. He also represented the label's interests to forge new relationships with iconic artists including Roger Waters, Kenny Loggins, Bad Company, John Fogerty, and Earth, Wind & Fire.

In 2011, Loeffler launched FieldHouse Music in association with BMG Music Rights and Universal Distribution. The venture established to discover and market new talent through licensing in film, TV and commercials. FieldHouse Music continues as a talent incubator for new artists and songwriters looking to be developed and promoted by a team of experienced professionals.

As a songwriter, record producer and entrepreneur, Loeffler's creative output as CEO of Rave Music, a company which he founded in the mid-1980s, was responsible for producing music for commercials, television, film and other forms of media. Rave Music is perhaps best known for creating the theme music and score for the popular animated television series Pokémon, as well as the numerous CDs, films and videos associated with the hit show. Loeffler co-produced most of the music for the English adaptation of the Pokémon TV series, most notably the "Pokémon Theme". Loeffler also produced an album for the series called Pokémon 2.B.A. Master. Additionally, the company produced soundtracks for networks including Country Music Television and HBO as well as music for commercials for Avon and Mitsubishi. More recently, he composed music for Genius Brands' web series SpacePOP. Before working on Pokémon, Loeffler composed music for various commercials and television shows including the sitcom Kate and Allie (which he also wrote, composed and sang the theme song), the music video show Friday Night Videos and the soap opera Another World as well writing songs for a few films including Backstreet Dreams and Night Visitor.

Loeffler began his career serving as music director for Grey Advertising for over twenty years (1979–2000).

== Early life ==
Attended Williams College, Bachelor of Arts (B.A.)

Field Of study: political science (major), social psychology and studio art (minors), cum laude
