= Michael Haigney =

American voice actor

Michael J Haigney
- Haigney at GalaxyCon San Jose in 2026
- Born: Michael Joseph Haigney
- Other name: Roger Kay
- Occupations: Producer; Voice Actor; Voice Director
- Notable work: Pokemon; Tai Chi Chasers; Yu-Gi-Oh; Sonic X
- Children: Maggie Haigney
- Website: www.cameo.com/zipprod

Michael Haigney, sometimes called Roger Kay, is an American television producer, voice actor, voice director, and English-language adaptation writer under 4Kids Entertainment for that dub of the Pokémon anime.

== Biography ==
Haigney was the original Voice Director for the Pokémon anime and the first four movies, responsible for adapting the scripts for an English audience. He is also the voice actor who provided the voices for dozens of Pokémon heard throughout the early Pokémon anime, such as Ash's Charmander and Snorlax, Misty's Psyduck, and James's Koffing and Weezing. His voiced Pokémon can also be heard in several video games, such as Pokémon Puzzle League and the Super Smash Bros. franchise of games. These days, he attends conventions and hosts his own podcast, "Original Pokéman".

== Filmography ==
=== Anime ===
| Year | Title | Role | Notes | Source |
|---|---|---|---|---|
| 1997-2001 | Pokemon | Adaptation, Voice Director, Voice Producer, Blaine, Blastoise, Charmander, Charmeleon, Cloyster, Cubone, Dewgong, Geodude, Golem, Graveler, Grimer, Hitmonchan, Hitmonlee, Hitmontop, Ivysaur, Koffing, Machop, Muk, Primeape, Psyduck, Raticate, Rattata, Seel, Shellder, Slowbro, Slowpoke, Snorlax, Venusaur | Seasons 1-4; 4Kids Dub | Credits |
| 2001-03 | Kirby: Right Back At Ya! | Producer, Script Adaptation, Knuckle Joe | | Name listed in the credits of "Fright to the Finish" |
| 2003-06 | Sonic X | Director | | Credits |
| 2010-16 | Yu-Gi-Oh | Director | 4Kids Dub; Zexal, Arc-V, | Credits |
| 2011-12 | Tai Chi Chasers | Director | 4Kids Dub; Episodes 26 and before | Credits |

=== Cartoon Animations ===
| Year | Title | Role | Notes | Sources |
|---|---|---|---|---|
| 2001-04 | Cubix: Robots for Everyone | Writer, Voice Producer | | Credits |
| 2006-10 | Chaotic | Producer, Writer | | Credits |

=== Games ===
| Year | Title | Role | Notes | Sources |
|---|---|---|---|---|
| 1999 | Super Smash Bros. | Venusaur, Charmander, Blastoise, Koffing and Snorlax | Reprisal | |
| 2000 | Pokémon Puzzle League | Blaine, Geodude, Poliwhirl, Primeape, Psyduck, Zippo (Charmander) | | |
| 2001 | Super Smash Bros. Melee | Venusaur, Blastoise and Snorlax | Reprisal | |
| 2003 | Pokémon Channel | Dugtrio, Hitmonlee, Weezing, Sudowoodo, Kecleon, Charmander, Psyduck, Koffing, Snorlax | Reprisal | Name listed in credits (under "Pokémon Voices") |
| 2008 | Super Smash Bros. Brawl | Snorlax | Reprisal | |
| 2014 | Super Smash Bros. for Nintendo 3DS and Wii U | Snorlax | Reprisal | |
| 2018 | Super Smash Bros. Ultimate | Snorlax | Reprisal | |
