= Junki Takegami =

Japanese anime and tokusatsu drama screenwriter

- 武上 純希
- Born: Shōzō Yamazaki; February 26, 1955 (age 71); Kagoshima Prefecture, Japan
- Occupations: Screenwriter, Novelist
- Writing career
- Pen name: Keiji Tanimoto; 武上 純季

Junki Takegami (武上 純希, Takegami Junki; born February 26, 1955) is a Japanese animation and tokusatsu screenwriter. His real name is Shōzō Yamazaki (山崎 昌三, Yamazaki Shouzou), he has also used the alias Keiji Tanimoto (谷本 敬次, Tanimoto Keiji) in the past.

== Works ==
=== Animated television series ===
- GoShogun (1981) - Screenplay, Editing
- Magical Princess Minky Momo (1982–1983) - Screenplay, Editing
- Clever Sarutobi (1982–1984) - Screenplay
- Plawres Sanshiro (1983–1984) - Screenplay
- Gu Gu Ganmo (1984–1985) - Screenplay
- Chikkun Takkun (1984) - Screenplay
- Persia, the Magic Fairy (1984–1985) - Screenplay
- Yoroshiku Mecha Doc (1984–1985) - Screenplay
- Dancouga – Super Beast Machine God (1985) - Screenplay
- Magical Emi, the Magic Star (1985–1986) - Screenplay
- GeGeGe no Kitarō (3rd series) (1985–1988) - Screenplay
- Robotan (1986) - Screenplay
- Maison Ikkoku (1986) - Screenplay
- Manga Naruhodo Monogatari (1986–1988) - Screenplay
- City Hunter (1986–1987) - Composition, Screenplay
- Gegege no Kitarou: Jigoku Hen (1988) - Screenplay
- Ironfist Chinmi (1988) - Series Composition, Screenplay
- Himitsu no Akko-chan 2 (1988–1989) - Screenplay
- Time Travel Tondekeman (1989–1990) - Series Composition, Screenplay
- Getter Robo Go (1991–1992) - Screenplay
- Dragon Quest: The Adventure of Dai (1991–1992) - Series Composition, Screenplay
- Mahou no Princess Minky Momo: Yume o Dakishimete (1991–1992) - Screenplay
- Kobo, the Li'l Rascal (1992–1994) - Screenplay
- Aoki Densetsu Shoot! (1993–1994) - Series Composition, Screenplay
- Red Baron (TV series) (1994–1995) - Series Composition, Screenplay
- Gulliver Boy (1995) - Screenplay
- Kuma no Puutarou (1995–1996) - Screenplay
- GeGeGe no Kitarō (4th series) (1996–1998) - Screenplay
- Dragon Ball GT (1996–1997) - Screenplay
- Mizuiro Jidai (1996–1997) - Series Composition, Screenplay
- Kero Kero Chime (1997) - Series Composition, Screenplay
- Pokémon (1997–2002) - Screenplay
- Beast Wars II: Super Life-Form Transformers (1998–1999) - Series Composition, Screenplay
- The Secrets of Akko-chan (1998–1999) - Series Composition, Screenplay
- Flower Angel Ten-Ten (1998–1999) - Screenplay
- Super Life-Form Transformers: Beast Wars Neo (1999) - Series Composition, Screenplay
- One Piece (1999–present) - Series Composition (episodes 1–195), Screenplay
- Transformers: Robots in Disguise (2000) - Series Composition, Screenplay
- Yu-Gi-Oh! Duel Monsters (2000–2004) - Series Composition (episodes 1–121), Screenplay
- Inuyasha (2000–2004) - Screenplay
- Forza! Hidemaru (2002) - Screenplay
- Naruto (2002–2007) - Series Composition (episodes 136–220), Screenplay
- Shin Megami Tensei: Devil Children - Light & Dark (2002–2003) - Screenplay
- Pokémon the Series: Advanced (2002–2006) - Screenplay
- Majuu Sensen: The Apocalypse (2003) - Series Composition, Screenplay
- Mermaid Melody Pichi Pichi Pitch (2003–2004) - Series Composition, Screenplay
- Gunslinger Girl (2003–2004) - Series Composition, Screenplay
- Shura no Toki - Age of Chaos (2004) - Series Composition, Screenplay
- Yu-Gi-Oh! GX (2004–2008) - Series Composition (episodes 1–156), Screenplay
- Pokemon 3D Adventure: Mew o Sagase! (2005) - Screenplay
- MÄR Heaven (2005–2007) - Series Composition, Screenplay
- Moeyo Ken (anime) (2005) - Series Composition, Screenplay
- Guyver: The Bioboosted Armor (2005–2006) - Series Composition, Screenplay
- Humanoid Monster Bem (2006) - Series Composition, Screenplay
- Pokémon the Series: Diamond and Pearl (2006–2010) - Screenplay
- Getsumento Heiki Mina (2007) - Series Composition, Screenplay
- Naruto Shippuden (2007–2017) - Series Composition (episodes 1–289, 296–479), Screenplay
- Hayate the Combat Butler (2007–2008) - Series Composition, Screenplay
- Moyasimon: Tales of Agriculture (2007) - Screenplay
- Yatterman (2008–2009) - Screenplay
- Chi's Sweet Home (2008) - Screenplay
- Chi's Sweet Home: Chi's New Address (2009) - Screenplay
- 07-Ghost (2009) - Screenplay
- Gokujō!! Mecha Mote Iinchō (2009–2010) - Screenplay
- Pokémon the Series: Black & White (2010–2013) - Screenplay
- Sket Dance (2011–2012) - Screenplay
- Ozuma (2012) - Series Composition, Screenplay
- Pokémon the Series: XY (2013–2015) - Screenplay
- Baby Steps (2014–2015) - Screenplay
- Lady Jewelpet (2014–2015) - Screenplay
- Pokémon the Series: XYZ (2015–2016) - Screenplay
- Heroes: Legend of the Battle Disks (2015) - Screenplay
- Yu-Gi-Oh! VRAINS (2017–2019) - Screenplay
- Yashahime: Princess Half-Demon (2020–2021) - Screenplay

=== Tokusatsu ===
- The How & Why? (1984–1986) - Screenplay
- Manga Naru Monogatari (1986–1989) - Screenplay
- Sukeban Detective III Girl Ninja Scroll Legend (1986–1987) - Screenplay
- Ore no Imouto Tokyujosho (1987–1988) - Screenplay
- Shoujo Commando Izumi (1987–1988) - Screenplay
- Fujiko Fujio's Dream Camera (TV drama) (1988) - Screenplay
- Hana no Asuka-gumi! (TV drama) (1988) - Screenplay
- Dennou Keisatsu Cybercop (1988–1989) - Series Composition, Screenplay
- Tales of the Bizarre (1990–1992) - Screenplay
- B-Grade Horror Warashi (1991–1992) - Screenplay
- Adults do not know (1992) - Screenplay
- Venus Heights (1992–1993) - Screenplay
- Keeping-Words Sisters Chouchoutrian (1993) - Screenplay
- Bakumatsu High School (1994) - Screenplay
- Lord's Furaibou Hidden Journey (1994) - Screenplay
- Thursday Ghost Stories (1995–1997) - Screenplay
- Purple Eyes in the Dark (TV drama) (1996) - Screenplay
- Ultraman Tiga (1996–1997) - Screenplay
- Denji Sentai Megaranger (1997–1998) - Main Screenwriter, Screenplay
- Ultraman Dyna (1997–1998) - Screenplay
- Seijuu Sentai Gingaman (1998–1999) - Screenplay
- Ultraseven 30th Anniversary Trilogy (1998) - Screenplay
- Ultraman Gaia (1998–1999) - Screenplay
- Kasouken no Onna (1999–2023) - Screenplay
- Kyuukyuu Sentai GoGoFive (1999–2000) - Main Screenwriter, Screenplay
- Ultraman Neos (2000–2001) - Main Screenwriter, Screenplay
- Hyakujuu Sentai Gaoranger (2001–2002) - Main Screenwriter, Screenplay
- Hyakuju Sentai Gaoranger: The Fire Mountain Roars (2001) - Screenplay
- Ultraman Cosmos (2001–2002) - Screenplay
- Ultraseven 35th Anniversary Evolution Pentalogy (2002) - Screenplay
- ダムド・ファイル (2003–2004) - Screenplay
- Tokusou Sentai Dekaranger (2004–2005) - Screenplay
- Magic Bullet Chronicles Ryukendo (2006) - Main Screenwriter, Screenplay
- GoGo Sentai Boukenger (2006–2007) - Screenplay
- Engine Sentai Go-onger (2008–2009) - Main Screenwriter, Screenplay
- Tokyo Ghost Trip (TV drama) (2008) - Screenplay
- Moyashimon (TV drama) (2010) - Screenplay
- Fake Kyoto Bijutsu Jiken Emaki (2011) - Screenplay
- Honboshi - Shinri Tokuso Jikenbo (2011) - Screenplay
- Ultraman R/B (2018) - Series Composition, Screenplay

=== Original video animation ===
- BIRTH (1984) - Original Plan Assistance
- Dancougar - Requiem for Victims (1986) - Screenplay
- Crystal Triangle (1987) - Screenplay
- Utsunomiko: Heaven Chapter (1990–1992) - Series Composition, Screenplay
- Apfelland Monogatari (1992) - Screenplay
- Little Twins (1992–1993) - Screenplay
- Moeyo Ken (OVA) (2003–2004) - Series Composition, Screenplay
- Ippatsu Hicchuu!! Devander (2012) - Screenplay

=== Films ===
- Leda: The Fantastic Adventure of Yohko (1985) - Screenplay
- Gegege no Kitarou: Gekitotsu!! Ijigen Youkai no Daihanran (1986) - Screenplay
- Secret of Akkochan (1989) - Screenplay
- Sore Ike! Anpanman: Baikinman no Gyakushuu (1990) - Screenplay
- Tenjou Hen: Utsu no Miko (1990) - Screenplay
- Black Princess Hell Angel (1990) - Screenplay
- Mikadroid (1991) - Screenplay
- Dragon Quest: Dai no Daibouken - Tachiagare!! Avan no Shito (1992) - Screenplay
- Dragon Quest: Dai no Daibouken - Buchiyabure!! Shinsei 6 Daishougun (1992) - Screenplay
- Little Twins: Bokura no Natsu ga Tondeiku (1992) - Screenplay
- Aoki Densetsu Shoot! (1994) - Screenplay
- Eko Eko Azarak: Wizard of Darkness (1995) - Screenplay
- Galaxy Express 999: Eternal Fantasy (1998) - Screenplay
- Yu-Gi-Oh! The Movie: Pyramid of Light (2004) - Screenplay
- Naruto Shippuden the Movie (2007) - Screenplay
- Naruto Shippuden the Movie: Bonds (2008) - Screenplay
- Naruto Shippuden the Movie: The Will of Fire (2009) - Screenplay
- Naruto Shippuden the Movie: The Lost Tower (2010) - Screenplay
- Road to Ninja: Naruto the Movie (2012) - Screenplay Assistance

=== Novels ===
- Ultraseven Episode: 0 (2002)
- Ultraseven Evolution (2002)

=== Video games ===
- Thousand Arms (1998) - Scenario
- Pokémon Channel - "PICHU BROS. IN PARTY PANIC!" (2003) - Screenplay
- Naruto Shippuden: Ultimate Ninja Storm Generations (2012) - Screenplay Support
