= GoShogun =

Japanese animated TV series

- Cover of the 2011 DVD Box set of Emotion the Best: Sengoku Majin GoShogun

戦国魔神ゴーショーグン (Sengoku Majin GōShōgun)
- Genre: Mecha
- Created by: Takeshi Shudo
- Anime television series
- Directed by: Kunihiko Yuyama
- Produced by: Yoshiaki Aibara; Hiroshi Katō
- Written by: Takeshi Shudo
- Music by: Tachio Akano
- Studio: Ashi Productions
- Licensed by: NA: Discotek Media
- Original network: Tokyo Channel 12
- Original run: July 3, 1981 – December 28, 1981
- Episodes: 26
- Anime film
- Directed by: Kunihiko Yuyama
- Produced by: Shūichi Onodera; Yasurō Yamaga; Hiroshi Katō; Masaru Umehara
- Written by: Takeshi Shudo
- Music by: Tachio Akano
- Studio: Ashi Productions
- Released: 24 April 1982
- Runtime: 63 minutes
- Anime film

The Time Étranger
- Directed by: Kunihiko Yuyama
- Produced by: Hideo Ogata; Hiroshi Katō
- Written by: Takeshi Shudo
- Music by: Tachio Akano
- Studio: Ashi Productions
- Licensed by: NA: Discotek Media
- Released: 27 April 1985
- Runtime: 90 minutes

GoShogun (戦国魔神ゴーショーグン, Sengoku Majin GōShōgun; lit. 'Warring Demon God GoShogun') is a Japanese super robot anime series created by Takeshi Shudo. It was produced and aired in 1981 in Japan, with a movie special released in 1982 and a film sequel, GoShogun: The Time Étranger or Time Stranger, in 1985. Its title has been variously translated into English as "Demon God of the War-Torn Land GoShogun", "Warring Demon God GoShogun", and "Civil War Devil-God GoShogun", but in the US and parts of Europe it is primarily known as Macron 1, the title of its North American adaptation.

The GoShogun series and its film sequel, The Time Étranger, were both written by Takeshi Shudo and directed by Kunihiko Yuyama. The series is noted for its witty dialogue and lighthearted parody of its own genre conventions. The Time Étranger shifts away from the original genre, leaving the robot aside entirely to focus on the strong and complex heroine. It has been praised for its serious tone, psychological intensity, and handling of mature themes.

== Original story ==
The story is set in the early 21st century, in which a covert evil organization, Dokuga, led by lord NeoNeros, holds near total world domination through political, economic, and military control. Dokuga agents try to forcibly recruit a brilliant physicist, Professor Sanada, who sets off a suicide bomb rather than let Dokuga acquire his secret research. His son Kenta becomes Dokuga's next target, but is saved by his father's colleague and taken on board a teleporting fortress, Good Thunder.

Teleportation is enabled by a mysterious form of energy, called Beamler, which was discovered by Sanada. The same energy also powers a giant battle robot, GoShogun, which is operated by three pilots. The crew of Good Thunder travels the world, repeatedly fighting off NeoNeros's forces with GoShogun and often hampering Dokuga's influence on the local level, whether by destroying their bases and businesses, assisting popular rebellions, or by averting environmental disasters. On at least one occasion, GoShogun pilots must team up with Dokuga's three chief officers against a common enemy to prevent the destruction of them all. This sets the stage for an eleventh-hour reversal, in which the three Dokuga generals side definitively against NeoNeros with the GoShogun team.

Over the course of the series, it is revealed that Beamler energy originates from a meteorite fragment found on the site of the Tunguska impact. It was sent to Earth by a supernatural power and was activated when humans attained the technological capacity for space exploration, to test whether humans are worthy of engaging with civilizations from other planets. Beamler's development is closely connected to Kenta, who in the end becomes the incarnate form of the energy and the representative of the earth's collective soul, including not only living things, but also newly sentient robots and machines. NeoNeros turns out to be a negative, evil form of the same energy. After defeating him, Kenta takes GoShogun into space.

== Episodes ==
No.	Title	Directed by	Written by	Original release date
1	"Goshogun, Take Off!" "Goshogun Hasshinseyo" (Japanese: ゴーショーグン発進せよ)	Directed by : Kunihiko Yuyama; Storyboarded by : Rei Hidaka	Takeshi Shudo	July 3, 1981
2	"Try-3's Fierce Fight" "Gekito Toraisuri" (Japanese: 激闘 トライスリー)	Junji Nishimura	Takeshi Shudo	July 10, 1981
3	"Little Fighter, Go!" "Ritoru Faita GO" (Japanese: リトルファイターGO)	Directed by : Hisataro Oba; Storyboarded by : Kunihiko Yuyama	Yuji Watanabe	July 17, 1981
4	"A Dangerous Prank" "Kiken Naitazura" (Japanese: 危険ないたずら)	Directed by : Kuniyoshi Inui; Storyboarded by : Masamune Ochiai	Yuji Watanabe	July 25, 1981
5	"The Hellish Fantasy Land" "Jigoku no Fantaji Rando" (Japanese: 地獄のファンタジーランド)	Directed by : Hisataro Oba; Storyboarded by : Tetsuro Amino	Takeshi Shudo	August 1, 1981
6	"The Monster With Flashing Eyes" "Hikaru Me no Akuma" (Japanese: 光る眼の悪魔)	Directed by : Kunihiko Yuyama; Storyboarded by : Masamune Ochiai	Shozo Yamazaki	August 7, 1981
7	"Friends in the Hidden Base" "Kakushi Toride no Nakamatachi" (Japanese: 隠し砦の仲間達)	Junji Nishimura	Kunihiko Yuyama	August 14, 1981
8	"Goshogun Cannot Return" "Goshogun Kikan Sezu" (Japanese: ゴーショーグン帰還せず)	Directed by : Hisataro Oba; Storyboarded by : Rei Hidaka	Shozo Yamazaki	August 21, 1981
9	"The Diamonds Burn Out" "Diamondo wa Moe Tsukite" (Japanese: ダイヤモンドは燃えつきて)	Junji Nishimura	Yuji Watanabe	August 28, 1981
10	"The Terrifying Secret of Beamler" "Osorobeshi Bimura no Nazo" (Japanese: 恐るべしビムラーの謎)	Directed by : Kunihiko Yuyama; Storyboarded by : Rei Hidaka	Takeshi Shudo	September 4, 1981
11	"Flowers For You" "Hanataba wo Kun ni" (Japanese: 花束を君に)	Junji Nishimura	Takeshi Shudo; Yuji Watanabe	September 11, 1981
12	"Montmartre, Land of Goodbyes" "Wakare no Montomatoru" (Japanese: 別れのモンマルトル)	Directed by : Hisataro Oba; Storyboarded by : Masamune Ochiai	Takeshi Shudo; Kaoru Kinoshita	September 18, 1981
13	"Clash in the Underworld" "Ankokugai no Gekito" (Japanese: 暗黒街の激斗)	Directed by : Kunihiko Yuyama; Storyboarded by : Rei Hidaka	Yuji Watanabe	September 25, 1981
14	"OVA Alone" "Hitori Bocchi no OVA" (Japanese: ひとりぼっちのOVA)	Directed by : Junji Nishimura; Storyboarded by : Rei Hidaka	Yuji Watanabe	October 5, 1981
15	"The Queen of the Hot Sands" "Nessa no Ojo" (Japanese: 熱砂の女王)	Directed by : Makoto Nagao; Storyboarded by : Hiroshi Kuzuoka	Sukehiro Tomita	October 12, 1981
16	"Farewell, Days of My Youth" "Saraba Seishun no Hibi" (Japanese: さらば青春の日々)	Kunihiko Yuyama	Takeshi Shudo	October 19, 1981
17	"Good Thunder in Great Danger" "Guddo Sanda Kiki Ippatsu" (Japanese: グッドサンダー危機一発)	Junji Nishimura	Shozo Yamazaki	October 26, 1981
18	"Kenta Pilots Goshogun" "Kenta Goshogun ni Noru" (Japanese: ケン太 ゴーショーグンに乗る)	Directed by : Hisataro Oba; Storyboarded by : Masamune Ochiai	Yuji Watanabe	November 2, 1981
19	"Crush the Secret London Base" "Tatakae! Rondon Himitsukichi" (Japanese: 叩け! ロンドン秘密基地)	Directed by : Makoto Nagao; Storyboarded by : Masamune Ochiai	Sukehiro Tomita	November 9, 1981
20	"Satellite Broadcast" "Uchu Chukei Kore ga Dokuga da" (Japanese: 宇宙中継これがドクーガだ)	Kunihiko Yuyama	Takeshi Shudo	November 16, 1981
21	"The Emperor's Intrigues" "Kotei no Inbo" (Japanese: 皇帝の陰謀)	Hisataro Oba	Yuji Watanabe	November 23, 1981
22	"Grounded! A Mystery From Below" "Fujo Chitei Kara no Nazo" (Japanese: 浮上 地底からの謎)	Directed by : Kunihiko Yuyama; Storyboarded by : Masamune Ochiai	Takeshi Shudo	November 30, 1981
23	"Good Thunder on the Loose" "Boso Guddo Sanda" (Japanese: 暴走グッドサンダー)	Junji Nishimura	Takeshi Shudo	December 7, 1981
24	"Crush the Ocean's Enemy" "Umi no Kana wo Tatake" (Japanese: 海の敵を叩け)	Hisataro Oba	Takeshi Shudo	December 14, 1981
25	"Countdown to the Final Fight" "Kessen Byoyomi Kaishi" (Japanese: 決戦 秒読み開始)	Directed by : Makoto Nagao; Storyboarded by : Masamune Ochiai	Takeshi Shudo	December 21, 1981
26	"The Neverending Journey" "Hate Shinaki Tabidachi" (Japanese: 果てしなき旅立ち)	Kunihiko Yuyama	Takeshi Shudo	December 28, 1981

== Adaptations ==
=== North America ===
In 1986, Saban Entertainment combined footage from GoShogun and Akū Dai Sakusen Srungle (Great Military Operation in Subspace Srungle or Mission Outer Space Srungle), a similar show produced by Kokusai Eiga-sha, to form Macron 1. Taking two (or more) unrelated series and re-editing them to appear as one storyline was common practice in adapting anime series to American television, as the number of episodes in a typical anime frequently fell short of the minimum number required for five-days-a-week syndication in the US market (65). Aside from Macron 1, Voltron: Defender of the Universe, Robotech, and Captain Harlock and the Queen of a Thousand Years were also stitched together in this manner. The combined series Macron 1 was produced and released in the United States, using the same voice cast as Carl Macek's Robotech adaptation.

In the US version, test pilot David Chance is accidentally transported into a parallel universe controlled by a tyrannical organization called GRIP, led by Dark Star. This allows GRIP to send their forces to Earth, leaving Dark Star's cyborg henchman Orn as deputy in the alternate universe. Fighting against GRIP are two teams comprising "Macron 1": the first (from the GoShogun footage) battles against Dark Star's legions on Earth; Beta Command (from the Srungle footage) is working to overthrow Orn. The main focus is on the Macron team on Earth, with Beta Command appearing sporadically.

The Macron 1 adaptation made use of the so-called "Miami Vice formula" introduced a year earlier by the eponymous primetime series, incorporating contemporary pop music into the action scenes. Notable musical adaptations included "Beat It", "Shout", "Safety Dance", and "The Heat is On".

Discotek Media released the series on subtitled-only DVD in November 2017. Central Park Media had licensed the Time Étranger film and released the film twice on DVD. Discotek has also licensed the film and released it on DVD and Blu-ray in June 2017.

=== Europe ===
Around the same time as the US adaptation, Saban released another version of the series in several European countries, also under the title Macron 1. This version, however, did not incorporate any footage from Srungle or the parallel-universe angle, making the international Macron 1 a more straightforward adaptation of GoShogun, though still heavily edited. In Italy the series was broadcast earlier, in 1982, as Gotriniton – Goshogun, and was a direct translation of the Japanese original, without recutting. In France, the first few episodes of GoShogun were released under the title Fulgutor.

This was the first anime series broadcast in the Soviet Union.

== Characters ==
=== Good Thunder Team ===
- Captain Sabarath (v.b. Osamu Kobayashi): Captain of Good Thunder and senior advisor of the GoShogun team; colleague of the late Professor Sanada. Depicted as bald, wearing tinted glasses, and smoking cigars; pragmatic and generally unemotional. Probably named after Telly Savalas, whom he resembles in appearance. Renamed Dr. James Shegall (v.b. Ike Medlick) in Macron 1.
- Shingo Hojo (v.b. Hirotaka Suzuoki): Young team leader and gunman who pilots the jet King Arrow, which docks in GoShogun's chest. He is in charge of GoShogun during battle, voice-activating its launch, the docking of the three jets, and various attacks. Stoic, serious, and a little stiff, but brave and level-headed under pressure. Prior to the events of the series, lost his fiancée in a Dokuga terrorist attack. Renamed Jason Templar (v.b. Cam Clarke) in Macron 1.
- Remy Shimada (v.b. Mami Koyama): Female pilot of the jet Queen Rose, which docks inside GoShogun's left leg. She is in charge of the smaller robot TriThree, voice-activating its assembly, movement, and attacks. Smart, spunky, and beautiful, but unlucky with the opposite sex. Formerly a secret agent in France. Knowledgeable in art; hopeless in the kitchen. Renamed Kathy Jamison (v.b. Lisa Michelson, then wife of Gregory Snegoff) in Macron 1.
- Killy Gagley (v.b. Hideyuki Tanaka): Pilot of the third jet, Jack Knight, which docks inside GoShogun's right leg. A former gangster from New York, nicknamed the "Wolf of Bronx", he is tough, street-smart, and something of a jokester. Has a knack for throwing knives, an eye for the ladies, and is writing an autobiography. Renamed Scott Cutter (v.b. Kerrigan Mahan) in Macron 1.
- Kenta Sanada (v.b. Yōko Matsuoka): The son of Professor Sanada, the scientist who discovered Beamler and built Good Thunder and GoShogun. Ten years old at the start of the series, highly inventive, but initially a slacker and troublemaker. Over time, he develops a paranormal ability to communicate with machines and robots, as well as with spirits of the earth's ecosystems, and finally becomes the living embodiment of Beamler energy. Renamed Nathan Bridger (v.b. Barbara Goodson) in Macron 1.
- Father (v.b. Yuzuru Fujimoto): Good Thunder's super-computer and AI, programmed from the mind of Professor Sanada. At times, overrides commands from Sabarath to follow the Professor's instructions and ensure the passing of Beamler energy from one stage of development to the next. Renamed Hugo (v.b. Steve Kramer) in Macron 1.
- OVA (v.b. Satomi Majima): Kenta's robot tutor and caretaker, who becomes more like a mother to him. Renamed ND-2 (v.b. Ted Layman) in Macron 1.
- TriThree: Small robot formed by the assembly of the three jets, piloted by Kathy, renamed MacStar-1 in Macron 1.
- GoShogun: The eponymous robot of the series, renamed MacStar in Macron 1. Its weapons include a gigantic axe, an energy sword, and a photon bazooka. GoShogun can fire laser-like beams from its eyes and other parts of its body. Its most powerful weapon, called GoFlasher, consists of five energy missiles launched from the robot's upper back, giving its head a semi-divine aura. Initially, GoFlasher has a purely destructive power, but as Beamler develops, this power becomes an animating one, giving sentience to enemy robots, which then choose to self-destruct rather than continue fighting.

=== Dokuga Crime Syndicate ===
- NeoNeros (v.b. Yuzuru Fujimoto): The evil leader, renamed Dark Star (v.b. Ike Medlick) in Macron 1. A menacing figure on a dark throne, he is always shown in shadow, and his true form is not revealed until the finale.
- Leonardo Medici Bundle (v.b. Kaneto Shiozawa): One of three chief officers of NeoNeros, specializing in intelligence, espionage, and intrigue. Appears as a dandy prince with long blond hair, usually holding a rose or a glass of red wine; judges everything on the basis of beauty or lack thereof, and goes into battle with classical music playing on loudspeakers. Over time, develops a romantic interest in Remy. His first and second names are based on Leonardo da Vinci and Lorenzo de Medici. In The Time Étranger, he is portrayed as a latter-day samurai, preferring the katana to other weapons. Renamed Prince Eharn (v.b. Gregory Snegoff) in Macron 1.
- Suegni Cuttnal (v.b. Shōjirō Kihara): Second henchman of NeoNeros, responsible for military strategy. Portrayed as an older-looking, one-eyed pirate, usually with his pet crow sitting on his shoulder. He runs a business selling his own brand of tranquilizers ("Cuttnalizers"), which he himself consumes frequently, by the handful. His other legitimate businesses include Disney-like amusement parks. The Time Étranger gives greater prominence to his role as a pharmaceutical scientist and later as surgeon general. Renamed Captain Blade (v.b. Mike Reynolds) in Macron 1.
- Yatta-la Kernagul (v.b. Daisuke Gōri): A synthetic human with blue-green skin, and third henchman of NeoNeros, responsible for combat operations. Crude, brutish, and has severe anger management issues. One of his driving ambitions, however, is to open a chain of fried chicken restaurants called "Kernagul's Fried Chicken" and a hamburger chain called "KerDonald's". He is shown to have achieved this dream in The Time Étranger. Renamed Lord Jeraldan (v.b. Robert V. Barron) in Macron 1.
- Dr. Jitter (v.b. Mikio Terashima): Scientist working for Dokuga, responsible for inventing destroids intended to destroy GoShogun, as well as other weapons and technological tricks. Often complains about insufficient funding. Renamed Dr. Fritz (v.b. Gregory Snegoff) in Macron 1.
- Mother (v.b. Satomi Majima): Dokuga's super-computer, counterpart to Father.
- Keruna: Kernagul's stress-relief robot, mainly functioning as his personal punching bag during outbursts of anger. Typically a source of comic relief, Keruna also plays a pivotal role towards the end of the show. Renamed Clarence (v.b. Ted Layman) in Macron 1.

==== Destroids ====
- Tester Robo: Appears in episode 2. Powers include an electric head laser, a 6-tube missile launcher in each pectoral, scanners, and flight.
- Debiza: Appears in episode 4. Power include flight, eight ensnaring tentacles each armed with a missile launcher, a cannon hidden in the nose, and laser resistant armor.
- Interception Robots: Appear in episode 5. Powers include flight, lasers from the eye, and launchable fists on wires
- Castler: Appears in episode 5. Powers include flight, three head horns, abdomen homing missiles, and an ax.
- Dogave: Appears in episode 6. Powers include flight, a pair of 6-tube rocket launchers on the front, an 8-tube rocket pod in each wing, and six laser cannons in the lower section.
- Fire Muscat: Appears in episode 7. Powers include flight, dividing into balls, and a tail blade.
- Scratchers: Appear in episode 8. Powers include flight, a pair of launchable claws, a frontal electric laser, an underside drill., and an energy cannon under each rear fin.
- Diamond Mine Guardian: Appears in episode 9. Powers include flight and pelvis missiles.
- Chandela: Appears in episode 10. Powers include flight, dual wing turbines that fire energy beams and can detach, underside crystal blades, electric surges, and a needle that fires lasers in the underside.
- Guerilla Robots: Appear in episode 11. Powers include swimming, eye and tail lasers, and anti-metal acid upon self destructing.
- Scorpia: Appear in episode 11. Powers include flight, bladed legs, and a tail napalm gun designed to plant bombs.
- Docuum: Appears in episode 13. Powers include flight, a mouth laser, a pair of 9-tube missile launchers in the torso, a pair of energy cannons on each side of the body, four clawed limbs that constrict upon detachment, and a pair of drills in each retractable limb.
- Spectrum: Appears in episode 14. Powers include flight, an underside searchlight that analyzes machines, gatling gun arms, a pelvis flamethrower, and electric surges.
- Zyclone: Appears in episode 15. Powers include burrowing, a sword stored on the back, energy balls from the fists, and energy rings from the hands.
- Missile Warrior: Appears in episode 18. Powers include flight, head lasers, a 5-tube rocket launcher for each hand, and a pair of missiles in the abdomen.
- Datsuma: Appears in episode 19. Powers include flight, swimming, and a torso heat beam.
- Disc Bion: Appears in episode 21. Powers include flight, underside capture rings that absorb teleportation energy, four internal capture claws, and a body tractor beam.
- Doshard: Appears in episode 22. Powers include flight, forehead beams, and heat resistant armor. Was given a double sided lance called the Dosherval in the Super Robot Wars games.
- Gonagurl: Appears in episode 23. Powers include flight, a Nagurl Bazooka on the back, and electric eye lasers. Was given a Nagurl Saber in the Super Robot Wars games.
- Turn Flasher: Appears in episode 25. Powers include levitation, beamlar absorption, and firing lasers from its core that can control machines.

== Movie Special ==
The GoShogun Movie, released in 1982, is a combination of episodes 20 and 17 (in that order) from the original series. It includes a summary of key events, snippets from the daily lives and background stories of the characters, and advertisements for fictional products. The closing credits show images of the main characters as children. The last of these, young Remy, would later make an appearance in The Time Étranger.

== The Time Étranger ==
A surrealistic follow-up film, known as The Time Étranger or Time Stranger (1985), is set forty years after the events of the GoShogun TV series. The team has long since disbanded, and most of them have lost touch, but when Remy is rendered comatose in a car crash, her old friends and former enemies gather at her bedside to try to lend her their strength. Meanwhile, in Remy's dream, she and her five friends are in the prime of their lives, and are trapped in a mysterious desert city inhabited by hostile fanatics, who worship a god of fate. All six team members receive anonymous letters that ordain for each of them a brutal death within several days, with Remy set to die first. As they fight back against the forces of fate, Remy is haunted by increasingly disturbing visions of her foretold demise, as well as by flashbacks to her lonely and troubled childhood, designed to drive her to despair. It is notable that the feature-length sequel of a "giant robot" series barely makes any reference to the giant robot, except for a brief shot of a GoShogun-shaped charm on the rearview mirror of Remy's car and a museum devoted to the former exploits of the GoShogun crew. All the fighting in the dream sequence is done with cold weapons and common firearms, such as Remy's trusty revolver.

== Video games ==
- The GoShogun team and mecha make several appearances in the Super Robot Wars series with various enemy robots including Debiza, Dogave, Doshard, the GoShogun doppelganger Gonagurl, and the three Dokuga ships and their fighters, the impactors.
- In Super Robot Wars Alpha 2 and Super Robot Wars Alpha 3, Leonardo Medici Bundle's ship has "The Blue Danube" as its default background music. This song is played on enormous speakers, and it is one of the few situations in which Elzam V. Branstein (a.k.a. Rätsel Feinschmecker)'s theme "Trombe!" is overridden.

== See also ==
- Magical Princess Minky Momo
- Chōdenji Machine Voltes V
- Watchmen
