= Josephina the Whale =

Japanese anime television series

くじらのホセフィーナ (Kujira no Josephina)
- Anime television series
- Directed by: Fumio Kurokawa
- Produced by: Takayuki Yanagisawa; Yoshiaki Aihara; Hiroshi Katō
- Written by: Yū Yamamoto; Takao Koyama; Hirohisa Soda; Hikaru Arai
- Music by: Kunihiro Kawano
- Studio: Ashi Productions; Kokusai Eiga-sha
- Original network: Tokyo Channel 12
- Original run: 2 April 1979 – 25 September 1979
- Episodes: 24

Josephina the Whale (くじらのホセフィーナ, Kujira no Josephina) is a Japanese anime television series consisting of 24 episodes. It was directed by Kunihiko Yuyama and Yoshikata Nitta; it was first broadcast on Tokyo Channel 12 (now TV Tokyo) in 1979.
