= Takeshi Shudo =

Japanese novelist (1949–2010)

- 首藤 剛志
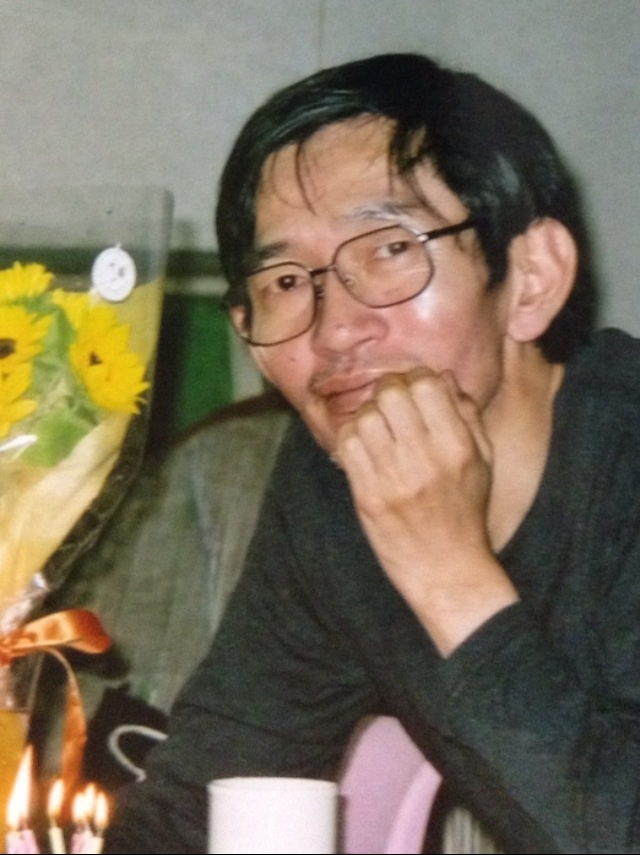
- Born: August 18, 1949; Fukuoka Prefecture, Japan
- Died: October 29, 2010 (aged 61); Nara, Japan
- Occupations: Screenwriter, novelist
- Relatives: Takashi Shudō (father)
- Writing career
- Years active: 1970–2010
- Genre: Anime TV series

Takeshi Shudo (首藤 剛志, Shudō Takeshi; (August 18, 1949 – October 29, 2010) was a Japanese scriptwriter, stage musical writer and novelist from Fukuoka Prefecture. He worked mainly in the animation industry. He was a member of the Writers Guild of Japan.

His major works include Space Warrior Baldios, Magical Princess Minky Momo, and Pokémon. He was known for his witty dialogue and the unique next episode previews of the series for which he was in charge of series composition. For Pokémon, he created Team Rocket's famous motto and conceptualized Lugia.

His father, Takashi Shudō (首藤 堯, Shudō Takashi) (February 1, 1923 – October 10, 2012), served as Fukuoka Prefecture's lieutenant governor, local vice-minister and chairman of the local finance association.

== Life and career ==
After failing the university entrance examination, Shudo read Scenario, a specialized magazine bought by his younger sister, which led him to enroll in a screenplay institute with the funds he had saved up to go to a prep school. He was recognized for the screenplays he had written there, and in 1969, at the age of 19, he made his debut as a scriptwriter in the 45th episode of the TV historical drama Ōedo Sōsamō. However, he grew tired of having to revise scripts that he was not satisfied with, and decided to stop writing scenarios, claiming he was fed up with penning human drama pieces. He spent the rest of his time working as a salesman for educational equipment and various ceremonial occasions, while at the same time assisting in the writing of original stories for shōjo manga, plots for TV dramas, and other jobs without taking credit for his work. Later, he roamed Europe with the money he had saved from his salesman job, and upon returning to Japan after running out, he was introduced by his acquaintance, screenwriter Fukiko Miyauchi, and in November 1976, he returned as a screenwriter for the animated TV series Manga Fairy Tales of the World produced by Dax International. Thereafter, he worked for Dax for a long time on several series starting with Paris no Isabelle and Manga Hajimete Monogatari.

In the early 1980s, he also worked for Tatsunoko Productions, but it was GoShogun and Magical Princess Minky Momo by Ashi Productions, where he was in charge of everything from the original concept to series composition, that revealed his talents as an author. He worked with Kunihiko Yuyama, the main director of both series, on the Minky Momo sequel and Pokémon in the 1990s.

In 1984, Shudo won the Best Screenplay Award at the first Japan Anime Awards for Manga Hajimete Monogatari, Magical Princess Minky Momo, and Sasuga no Sarutobi. He also worked as a novelist, and his best-known work is the Eternal Filena series.

Shudo was born in Fukuoka Prefecture, but because his father was a government official, he lived in Tokyo, Sapporo, and Nara Prefecture as a child, and he attributed his dry, non-indigenous writing style to that experience. He had lived in Shibuya in Tokyo since the fifth grade of elementary school, and set the anime Idol Angel Yokoso Yoko in Shibuya. Later, he moved to Odawara in Kanagawa Prefecture, and most of his later works were written there.

In his later years, he contributed a column to the Anime Style website and was preparing a feature film. The scripts and other materials for the major works he was involved in producing were donated to the Odawara City Library. Some of the library's materials are on permanent display at the Odawara Literature Museum.

== Death ==
Around the age of 50, Shudo became frequently ill and was in and out of the hospital repeatedly. On October 28, 2010, he collapsed after suffering a subarachnoid hemorrhage in a smoking room at West Japan Railway Company's Nara Station in Nara, where he was visiting. He was rushed to the hospital and underwent emergency surgery, but did not regain consciousness and died at 4:03 a.m. on October 29, 2010, at the age of 61.

In 2011, a memorial exhibition titled "In Memoriam of the Screenwriter Takeshi Shudo" was held at the Suginami Animation Museum in Suginami, Tokyo.

The 2017 anime film, Pokémon the Movie: I Choose You!, posthumously credits Shudo as partial screenwriter, as he wrote the script for the first episode of the TV anime, which was used as the base for the early part of the film.

== Works ==
- series head writer denoted in bold

=== TV Anime ===
- Manga Sekai Mukashi Banashi (1976)
- Manga Hajimete Monogatari (1978–1984)
- Paris no Isabelle (1979)
- Manga Sarutobi Sasuke (1979–1980)
- Space Warrior Baldios (1980–1981)
- Muteking, The Dashing Warrior (1981)
- Toshishun (1981)
- **GoShogun** (1981)
- Golden Warrior Gold Lightan (1981-1982)
- Dash Kappei (1981–1982)
- Thunderbirds 2086 (1982)
- Acrobunch (1982)
- **Magical Princess Minky Momo** (1982–1983)
- **Sasuga no Sarutobi** (1982–1984)
- Stop!! Hibari-kun! (1983)
- Taotao (1983–1985)
- Video Warrior Laserion (1984)
- Chikkun Takkun (1984)
- Manga Doshite Monogatari (1984–1986)
- Manga Naruhodo Monogatari (1986–1988)
- Shin Manga Naruhodo Monogatari (1988)
- Manga Hajimete Omoshirojuku (1989)
- **Idol Angel Yokoso Yoko** (1990–1991)
- **Magical Princess Minky Momo: Hold on to Your Dreams** (1991–1992)
- **Chō Kuse ni Narisō** (1994–1995)
- Martian Successor Nadesico (1996–1997)
- **Pokémon** (1997–2002)
- Pokémon: Mewtwo Returns (2000)
- **Dancouga Nova - Super God Beast Armor** (2007)

=== Film ===
- Legend of the Galactic Heroes: My Conquest is the Sea of Stars (1988)
- Pokémon: The First Movie (1998)
- Pokémon: The Movie 2000 (1999)
- Pokémon 3: The Movie (2000)
- Pokémon the Movie: I Choose You! (2017)
- Pokémon: Mewtwo Strikes Back—Evolution (2019)

=== OVA ===
- Radio City Fantasy (1984)
- GoShogun: The Time Étranger (1985)
- Magical Princess Minky Momo: La Ronde in my Dream (1985)
- Cosmos Pink Shock (1986)
- Legend of the Galactic Heroes (1988)
- Eternal Filena (1992–1993)
- Minky Momo in The Bridge Over Dreams (1993)
- Minky Momo in The Station of Your Memories (1994)

=== Novels ===
- Eternal Filena (9 volumes)
- Pocket Monsters The Animation
  - Vol. 1: Departure
  - Vol. 2: Friends
