= Ricky Ma =

Hong Kong-born Canadian designer and robotic hobbyist

Ricky Ma (Chinese: 馬子恒) is a Hong Kong-born Canadian designer and independent robotic hobbyist, known for creating a life-sized humanoid robot named Mark 1. He is noted as one of the first individuals to build a full-scale humanoid robot independently, without institutional or corporate backing.

== Biography ==
Ricky Ma has a background in product and graphic design, with over 25 years of experience in the industry. Influenced by Japanese animation during his youth—particularly the series Plawres Sanshiro—he developed an early interest in robotics.

In his spare time, Ma taught himself skills such as electronics, mechanics, programming, and 3D printing. Over approximately 18 months, he constructed Mark 1, a humanoid robot that could respond to voice commands, perform simple facial movements, and display basic expressions. Around 70% of the robot’s parts were produced using 3D printing. The robot drew public attention for its resemblance to the well-known actress Scarlett Johansson, although Ma stated that any likeness was unintentional.

== Media coverage ==
Mark 1 and Ricky Ma have been featured in various international media outlets, including:

- Reuters - International Business Times - Global News Canada - South China Morning Post - CBS News - Inverse - Interesting Engineering

== Recognition ==
As of 2025, Ricky is one of the few individuals known to have independently developed a lifelike humanoid robot for artistic and experimental purposes. His project has been referenced in media coverage and discussions relating to personal robotics and the intersection of art and technology.

In 2018, Ricky delivered a presentation at the IdeaCity conference in Toronto, discussing the creation process and vision behind Mark 1.

== Subsequent projects ==
Following the completion of Mark 1, Ricky continued to explore the integration of robotics and art. In 2022, he initiated the MechaArt Nexus project, aiming to further investigate the convergence of mechanical engineering and artistic expression. This endeavor seeks to challenge traditional perceptions of robotics by emphasizing their potential as mediums of creative storytelling and cultural reflection.
