= Arisa Andō =

Japanese voice actress

- 安藤ありさ
- Born: March 5, 1961 (age 65); Tokyo, Japan
- Occupation: Voice actress
- Years active: 1979–2000s

Arisa Andō (安藤 ありさ, Andō Arisa; born March 5, 1961) is a former Japanese voice actress.

== Notable roles ==
=== Anime television ===
- Anpanman – Onion Demon
- Bakusō Kyōdai Let's & Go!! – As R
- Highschool! Kimen-gumi – Hiro as a child
- Domain of Murder – Sayoko Tōyama
- Plawres Sanshiro – Kyōko Fubuki
- Fist of the North Star – Airi
- Noozles – Sandy

=== OVA ===
- Eternal Filena – Filena
- JoJo's Bizarre Adventure – Holly Kujo
- Dōkyūsei – Mako Saitō
- Fight! Iczer One – Sepia
- RG Veda – Kendappa-ō
- Cream Lemon - Kyōko Terasawa, Rie Komatsuzaki, Yulia, Mako, Arisa Ayukawa

=== Anime films ===
- Fist of the North Star – Airi

=== Dubbing ===
- Dragon Fist – Zhuang Meng-lan (Nora Miao)
