= Idol Angel Yokoso Yoko =

Japanese anime television series

- アイドル天使ようこそようこ
- Created by: Takeshi Shudo
- Written by: Takeshi Shudo
- Directed by: Tetsurō Amino
- Music by: Takahiro Ando; Melody Farm
- Country of origin: Japan
- Original language: Japanese
- No. of episodes: 43

Production
- Producers: Naoyuki Masaki; Chiyo Okazaki; Masahiko Miyoshi; Tomoyuki Taguchi; Yukinao Shimoji
- Production companies: TV Setouchi; Bigwest; Ashi Productions

Original release
- Network: TXN (TSC, TV Tokyo)
- Release: April 2, 1990 – February 4, 1991

Idol Angel Yōkoso Yōko (アイドル天使ようこそようこ, Aidoru Tenshi Yōkoso Yōko; Idol Angel Welcome Yoko) is a 1990 Japanese anime television series created by Ashi Productions and Big West Advertising. It aired on TV Setouchi from April 2, 1990, and February 4, 1991 – spanning 43 episodes. The series is preceded by Idol Densetsu Eriko and succeeded by Getter Robo Go in its initial time-slot.

== Plot ==
Yoko Tanaka (田中 ようこ, Tanaka Yōko), an aspiring singer, meets her partner in-crime Saki Yamamori (山杜 サキ, Yamamori Saki) on a bullet train to Tokyo. The two girls go to Shibuya to pursue an entertainment career and are eventually scouted by Toshio Harada.

== Characters ==
- Yoko Tanaka (voiced by Mika Kanai)
- Saki Yamamori
- Toshio Harada

== Episodes ==
No.	Title	Directed by	Written by	Original release date
1	"Welcome in Koen-dori" "Yōkoso in Kōen-dori" (Japanese: ようこそIN公園通り)	Directed by : Toshiaki Suzuki; Storyboarded by : Tetsurō Amino	Takeshi Shudo	April 2, 1990
2	"The Singing Voice is from Bayer" "Utagoe wa Baieru de" (Japanese: 歌声はバイエルで)	Directed by : Satoru Okada; Storyboarded by : Yoshihide Kuriyama	Takeshi Shudo	April 9, 1990
3	"Wonderful Loft" "Sutekina Rofuto" (Japanese: すてきなロフト)	Kenjiro Yoshida	Takeshi Shudo	April 16, 1990
4	"Tomato is the Singing Voice of Morning" "Tomato no Asa wa Utagoe de" (Japanese: トマトの朝は歌声で)	Directed by : Raisen Hanyu; Storyboarded by : Satoshi Kurai	Yukiyo Takihana	April 23, 1990
5	"Midnight Live" "Mayonaka no Raibu" (Japanese: 真夜中のライブ)	Directed by : Takao Kato; Storyboarded by : Koji Masunari	Yumi Kageyama	April 30, 1990
6	"Sound! The Violin of Heart" "Hibike! Kokoro no Baiorin" (Japanese: 響け! 心のバイオリン)	Toshiaki Suzuki	Seiko Watanabe	May 7, 1990
7	"The Lonely Town God" "Sabishi ga Riya no Machi no Kamisama" (Japanese: さびしがりやの町のかみさま)	Yoshitaka Fujimoto	Hiroyuki Kawasaki	May 14, 1990
8	"Wonderful Hands Loft" "Sutekina Hanzurofuto" (Japanese: すてきなハンズロフト)	Hiroshi Yoshida	Takeshi Shudo	May 21, 1990
9	"Wonderful Misunderstanding" "Sutekina Kanchigai" (Japanese: すてきなカンちがい)	Directed by : Raisen Hanyu; Storyboarded by : Satoshi Kurai	Yumi Kageyama	May 28, 1990
10	"Welcome to Yu-topia" "Yōkoso Yutopia" (Japanese: ようこそ湯トピア)	Directed by : Nobuo Tasaki; Storyboarded by : Takao Kato	Teppei Den	June 4, 1990
11	"Rain on Spain Hill" "Supein-saka no Ame" (Japanese: スペイン坂の雨)	Toshiaki Suzuki	Michiru Shimada	June 11, 1990
12	"The Witch on the Moonlit Night" "Majo wa Gatsu no Yoru ni" (Japanese: 魔女は月の夜に)	Directed by : Mihiro Yamaguchi; Storyboarded by : Yoshitaka Fujimoto	Yukiko Tozawa	June 18, 1990
13	"The Exchange Diary of Love" "Ai no Kokan Nikki" (Japanese: 愛の交換日記)	Kenjiro	Seiko Watanabe	June 25, 1990
14	"Memorization and A to Z of Love" "Anki to Koi no A to Z" (Japanese: 暗記と恋のA to Z)	Raisen Hanyu	Hiroko Naka	July 2, 1990
15	"With Dreams on Your Wings" "Tsubasa ni Yume o Nosete" (Japanese: 翼に夢を乗せて)	Toshiaki Suzuki	Yuho Hanazono	July 9, 1990
16	"Miracle of the Small Starry Sky" "Chīsana Hoshizora no Kiseki" (Japanese: 小さな星空の奇跡)	Satoshi Kurai	Yumi Kageyama	July 16, 1990
17	"The Path to Idols (Part 1)" "Aidoru e no Michi (Part 1)" (Japanese: アイドルへの道Part 1)	Takao Kato	Michiru Shimada	July 30, 1990
18	"The Path to Idols (Part 2)" "Aidoru e no Michi (Part 2)" (Japanese: アイドルへの道Part 2)	Kenjiro	Michiru Shimada	August 6, 1990
19	"Welcome Summer Snowman" "Yōkoso Natsu no Yukidaruma" (Japanese: ようこそ夏の雪ダルマ)	Yoshitaka Fujimoto	Teppei Den	August 13, 1990
20	"Summer, I'm Healthy" "Natsu, Watashi, Genki Desu" (Japanese: 夏、私、元気です)	Toshiaki Suzuki	Takeshi Shudo	August 20, 1990
21	"Sing! Dash! Grand Prix" "Utae! Hashire! Guranpuri" (Japanese: 歌え!走れ!グランプリ)	Directed by : Takao Kato; Storyboarded by : Tetsuro Amino	Shigeru Sato	August 27, 1990
22	"Kōendōri Zoo" "Kōendōri no Dobutsuen" (Japanese: 公園通りの動物園)	Takao Kato	Yuho Hanazono	September 3, 1990
23	"I Don't Know About War" "Sensō wa Shiranai" (Japanese: 戦争は知らない)	Kenjiro	Yasuko Hoshikawa	September 10, 1990
24	"Grandpa's Counterattack" "Guranpa no Gyakushu" (Japanese: グランパの逆襲)	Raisen Hanyu	Kanehiro Hamada	September 17, 1990
25	"Search for the New Trendy!" "Nyū Torendi wo Sagase!" (Japanese: ニュートレンディを探せ!)	Directed by : Satoru Okada; Storyboarded by : Satoshi Kurai	Yumi Kageyama	September 24, 1990
26	"A Boy Searching For A Star" "Sutā o Sagasu Otoko" (Japanese: スターを探す男)	Toshiaki Suzuki	Seiko Watanabe	October 1, 1990
27	"Welcome Curry March" "Yōkoso Kare Koshinkyoku" (Japanese: ようこそカレー行進曲)	Takao Kato	Shigeru Sato	October 8, 1990
28	"An Idol Behind the Glass" "Garasu no Naka no Aidoru" (Japanese: ガラスの中のアイドル)	Kenjiro	Takeshi Shudo; Yuho Hanazono	October 15, 1990
29	"Lesson Under the Sky" "Ressun Andā Za Sukai" (Japanese: レッスンアンダーザスカイ)	Yoshitaka Fujimoto	Kanehiro Hamada	October 22, 1990
30	"Arrest Me With My Singing Voice" "Utagoe de Taiho Shite" (Japanese: 歌声でタイホして)	Toshiaki Suzuki	Yumi Kageyama	October 29, 1990
31	"Cinema Panic Paradise" "Shinema Panikku Paradaisu" (Japanese: シネマパニックパラダイス)	Directed by : Satoru Okada; Storyboarded by : Yoshihide Kuriyama	Takeshi Shudo; Teppei Den	November 5, 1990
32	"Idol Star Crisis" "Ai Star Kiki Ippatsu" (Japanese: アイStar危機一髪)	Directed by : Raisen Hanyu; Storyboarded by : Tetsuro Amino	Michiru Shimada	November 12, 1990
33	"Letters From the Love Letter Alley" "Koibumi Yokochō Kara no Tegami" (Japanese: 恋文横丁からの手紙)	Takao Kato	Yasuko Hoshikawa	November 19, 1990
34	"My Juliet (Part 1)" "Watashi no Jurietto (Part 1)" (Japanese: わたしのジュリエットPart 1)	Kenjiro Yoshida	Takeshi Shudo	November 26, 1990
35	"My Juliet (Part 2)" "Watashi no Jurietto (Part 2)" (Japanese: わたしのジュリエットPart 1)	Toshiaki Suzuki	Takeshi Shudo	December 3, 1990
36	"Kitten's Melancholy" "Neko-chan no Yū'utsu" (Japanese: 猫子ちゃんのユウウツ)	Yoshitaka Fujimoto	Takeshi Shudo; Yukiko Tozawa	December 10, 1990
37	"I Know About Idols" "Aidoru wa Shitte Iru" (Japanese: アイドルは知っている)	Directed by : Satoru Okada; Storyboarded by : Satomi Yoshida	Takeshi Shudo	December 17, 1990
38	"The Day Earth Runs Out of Oxygen" "Chikyū no Sanso ga Nakunaru Hi" (Japanese: 地球の酸素がなくなる日)	Directed by : Raisen Hanyu; Storyboarded by : Takao Kato	Mami Koyama	December 24, 1990
39	"The Circus Came!" "Sākasu ga Kita!" (Japanese: サーカスが来た!)	Takao Kato	Yumi Kageyama	January 7, 1991
40	"Let's Sing With the Bird" "Rettsu Shingu with Bādo" (Japanese: レッツシングwithバード)	Toshiaki Suzuki	Kyoko Kashiwagi	January 14, 1991
41	"Dream Labyrinth" "Yume no Rabirinsu" (Japanese: 雪のラビリンス)	Kenjiro Yoshida	Tetsuro Amino	January 21, 1991
42	"Alice From Wonder City (Part 1)" "Fushigi no Machi no Arisu-tachi (Part 1)" (Japanese: 不思議の街のアリスたちPart 1)	Directed by : Yasushi Murayama; Storyboarded by : Tetsuro Amino	Takeshi Shudo	January 28, 1991
43	"Alice From Wonder City (Part 2)" "Fushigi no Machi no Arisu-tachi (Part 2)" (Japanese: 不思議の街のアリスたちPart 2)	Directed by : Yoshitaka Fujimoto; Storyboarded by : Tetsuro Amino	Takeshi Shudo	February 4, 1991

Preceded by Idol Densetsu Eriko (4/3/1989 - 3/26/1990)	TV Tokyo Monday 19:00 Timeframe Idol Angel Yokoso Yoko (April 2, 1990 - February 4, 1991)	Succeeded by Getter Robo Go (2/11/1991 - 1/27/1992)
