= Akemi Takada =

Japanese illustrator

Akemi Takada 高田明美
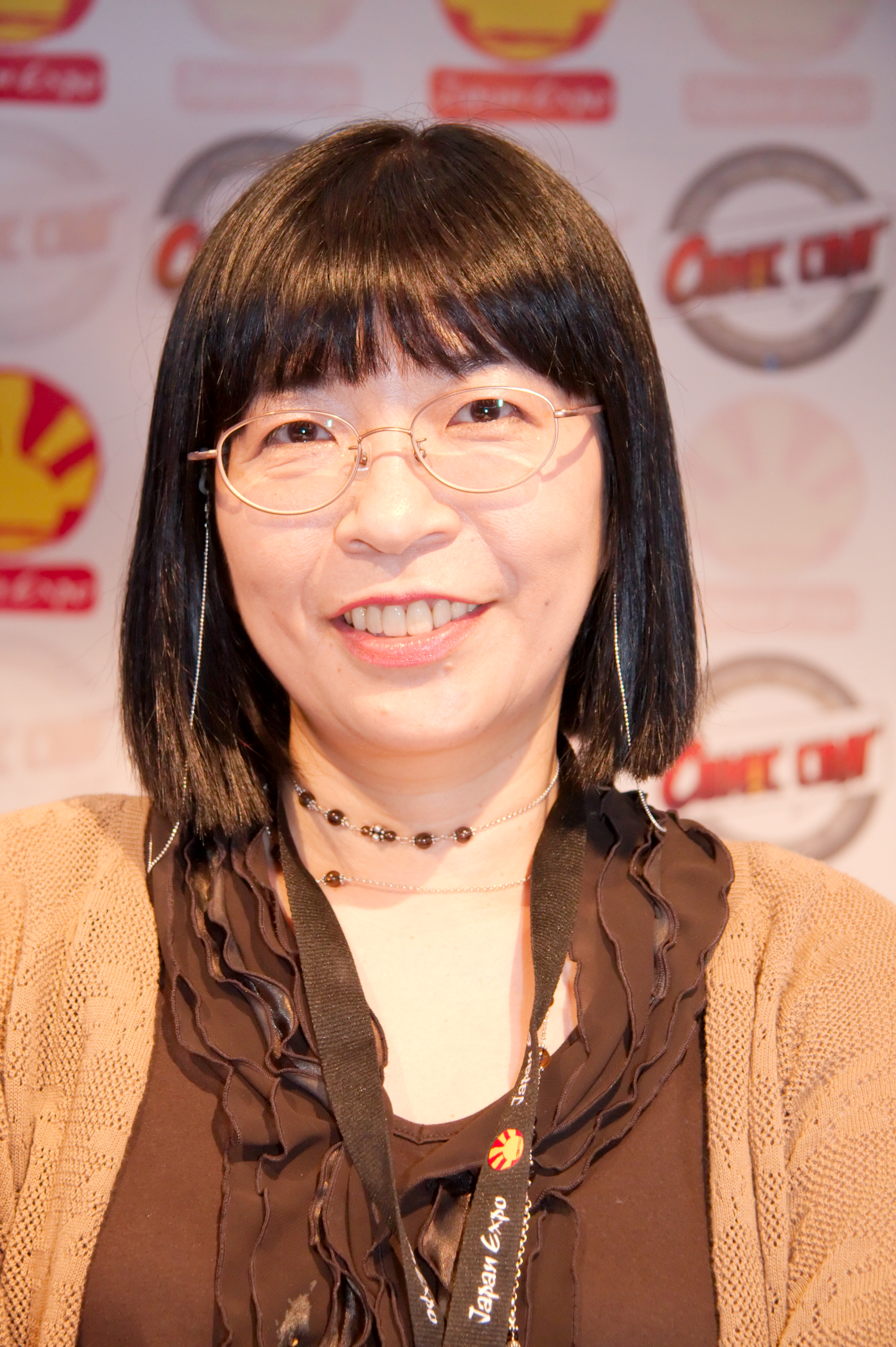
- Akemi Takada at Japan Expo 2009
- Born: March 31, 1955 (age 71); Tokyo, Japan
- Education: Tama Art University, Tatsunoko Pro
- Known for: Painting, manga, anime character design, jewelry design
- Notable work: Character designs for Kimagure Orange Road and Urusei Yatsura
- Movement: Anime, manga

Akemi Takada (高田明美, Takada Akemi; born March 31, 1955) is a Japanese manga artist and anime character designer born in Tokyo, Japan. Her character-design work is one of the more recognizable styles of the 1980s, when she worked on series like Creamy Mami and Kimagure Orange Road. She is also noted for her long collaboration with director Mamoru Oshii. She graduated from Tama Art University, after which she worked for Tatsunoko Pro. She is currently a freelance manga artist with her own studio, though she is also a member of the creative group Headgear. She also has her own designer jewelry store called Diakosmos.

Takada began working for Tatsunoko productions after visiting the production office as a fan during the broadcast of Gatchaman.

== Books ==
=== Art books ===
- Anniversary ISBN 4-89189-297-8
- Creamy Mami: Memories of Magical World ISBN 4-7973-1566-0
- Eyes: Kidō Keisatsu Patlabor Gashū (art collection)
- Madoka ISBN 4-04-853294-4
- Magical Angel Creamy Mami: Long Good-Bye
- Misty Orb ISBN 4-87188-441-4
- The Mobile Police Patlabor: Air ISBN 4-8291-9113-9
- The Mobile Police Patlabor: Pulsation ISBN 4-8291-9106-6
- Patlabor Illustration Works: Now or Never ISBN 4-8291-9125-2
- Sekaiki: Ygg-drasil ISBN 4-8291-9109-0
- Takada Akemi Art Book: Complete Visual Works ISBN 4-89189-375-3
- Takada Akemi Art Book 2: Crystella ISBN 4-89189-331-1
- Tir na Sorcha ISBN 4-8291-9117-1
- La Madonna ISBN 9784894258655 character illustrations from Kimagure Orange Road

=== As illustrator ===
- Akuma no you na Watashi (cover and interior illustration, novel by Sadamu Yamashita)
- Aoi Requiem (cover and interior illustration, novel by Kei Rokudō)
- Devilman (illustrations in Weekly Morning (1999))
- Eternal Filena (vol.1-9, cover and interior illustration, novels by Takeshi Shudō)
- Ekuusu (vol.1-2, cover and interior illustration, novels by Hitoshi Yoshioka)
- Full Moon no Densetsu Indora (vol.1-2, cover and interior illustration, novels by Hisayuki Toriumi)
- Hiiro no Rouge de Hajimatta, ISBN 4-10-123611-9 (cover and interior illustration, novel by Hitomi Fujimoto)
- Hōkago, Ice Tea (cover and interior illustration, novel by Ryō Kubota)
- Jinbaika Series vol.1: Lavendar ga Miteita (cover and interior illustration, novel by Yū Maki)
- Jinbaika Series vol.2: Rose Marie ga Sasayaku (cover and interior illustration, novel by Yū Maki)
- Jinbaika Series vol.3: Fennel ha Yumemiru (cover and interior illustration, novel by Yū Maki)
- Jūchūki (vol.1-2, cover and interior illustration, novel by Saori Kumi)
- Kidō Keisatsu Patlabor: Black Jack (vol.1-2, cover and interior illustration, novel by Michiko Yokote)
- Kidō Keisatsu Patlabor: Fūsoku 40 Meters (cover and interior illustration, novel by Kazunori Itō)
- Kidō Keisatsu Patlabor: Syntax Error (cover and interior illustration, novel by Michiko Yokote)
- Kidō Keisatsu Patlabor: Third Mission (cover and interior illustration, novel by Michiko Yokote)
- Ki no Kuni no Hime (cover and interior illustration, novel by Reiko Hikawa)
- Kurenai Gankyō (cover and interior illustration, novel by Mamoru Oshii)
- Nagareyuku Kawa no you ni (cover and interior illustration, novel by Shinobu Saeki)
- Nijiiro no Seishun Matsuri (cover and interior illustration, novel by Seiichi Morimura)
- Nishikaze no Senki (cover and illustration, novel by Yoshiki Tanaka)
- Ōjo Asutoraia, (cover and interior illustration, novel by Hitomi Fujimoto)
- Ōto no Shō Areku, (cover and interior illustration, novel by Hitomi Fujimoto)
- Project Hanasaku Otome, (cover and interior illustration, novel by Yū Maki)
- Program Usher: Kaze-tachi no Mezame ISBN 4-257-76522-4 (cover and interior illustration, novel by Ryō Katsuragi)
- Rasetsuoh (vol.1-7, cover and interior illustration, novel by Kei Rokudō)
- Sanjūshi: The Three Musketeers (cover and interior illustration, novel by Alexandre Dumas)
- Seikonsha Yū: Bara no Stranger (cover and interior illustration, novel by Takeshi Narumi)
- Seikonsha Yū: Haō no Tablet (cover and interior illustration, novel by Takeshi Narumi)
- Seikonsha Yū: Ōgon no Princess (cover and interior illustration, novel by Takeshi Narumi)
- Shinju-tachi (cover and interior illustration, novel by Saori Kumi)
- Shoujo no you ni Kirara ka ni (cover and interior illustration, novel by Sadamu Yamashita)
- Shutendōji (cover and interior illustration, novel by Go Nagai)
- Sōmujō (poster and illustration, short story by Yoshiki Tanaka in February 1997 Amie)
- Sōmujō (insert cover and illustration, short story by Yoshiki Tanaka in 1999 Amie)
- Spiral Zone (cover and interior illustration, novel by Kazunori Itō)
- Suiren no Kokuin (cover and interior illustration, novel by Maki Kanemaru)
- Suishōkyū no Erisu (cover and interior illustration, novels by Hitomi Fujimoto)
- Suizoku (cover and interior illustration, novel by Chūsekisha)
- Sweet Valley Twins (series cover and interior illustration, novels by Francine Pascal)
- Tenkooru Toki ha Akatsuki (cover and interior illustration, novel by Noriko Yahikozawa)
- Tessius no Yūwaku (cover and interior illustration, novel by Hitomi Fujimoto)
- Toki no Hikari, Toki no Kage (cover and interior illustration, novel by Kei Rokudō)
- Yasashii Yoru no Hitomi (cover and interior illustration, novel by Michiko Yokote)
- Yūwakusha (cover and interior illustration, novel by Saori Kumi)

== Filmography ==
Listed alphabetically by decade, with role and studio (if know) in parentheses.

=== 1970s ===
- Ippatsu Kanta-kun (Tatsunoko Pro)
- Science Ninja Team Gatchaman (Tatsunoko Pro)
  - Science Ninja Team Gatchaman F (Tatsunoko Pro)

=== 1980s ===
- Honoo no Alpenrosé: Judy & Randy (TV series, Tatsunoko Pro) 1985
- Kaitei Taisen: Ai no 20000 Miles (Tatsunoko Pro)
- Kidō Keisatsu Patlabor (OVA and TV series, character designer) 1988
- Patlabor: The Movie (character designer) 1989
- Kimagure Orange Road (TV series, character designer) 1987
  - Kimagure Orange Road: Hawaiian Suspense (OVA, character designer)
  - Kimagure Orange Road vol. 2 (OVA, character designer)
  - Kimagure Orange Road: Ano Hi ni Kaeritai (character designer, Toho)
- Magical Angel Creamy Mami (character designer, Studio Pierrot) 1983
  - Magical Angel Creamy Mami: Eien no Once More (OVA, character designer, Studio Pierrot)
  - Magical Angel Creamy Mami: Long Good-Bye (OVA, character designer, Studio Pierrot)
  - Magical Angel Creamy Mami: Curtain Call (OVA, character designer, Studio Pierrot)
- Maison Ikkoku (TV series, character designer from episode 27, Kitty Films/Studio Deen)
- Maitchingu Machiko-sensei (Gakken) 1981
- Mirai Keisatsu Urashiman (Tatsunoko Pro)
- Niji Iro no Seishun Matsuri (character designer)
- Tondemo Senshi Mutekingu (Tatsunoko Pro)
- Twilight Q: Toki no Musubime (OVA, Ajia-do Animation Works)
- Urban Square: Kohaku no Tsuigeki (OVA)
- Urusei Yatsura (TV series, character designer, animation director, Kitty Films/Studio Pierrot)
  - Urusei Yatsura Movie 1: Only You (character designer, Kitty Films/Studio Pierrot)
  - Urusei Yatsura Movie 3: Remember My Love (character designer, Kitty Films/Studio Pierrot)
  - Urusei Yatsura Movie 4: Lum the Forever (character designer, Kitty Films/Studio Pierrot)
  - Urusei Yatsura: Ryoko's September Tea Party (character designer, Kitty Films/Studio Pierrot)

=== 1990s ===
- Creamy Mami 2 (image boards)
- Fancy Lala (character designer)
- Kidō Keisatsu Patlabor (OVA series, character designer)
- Patlabor 2: The Movie (character designer)
- Licca (OVA, character designer)
- Patlabor: After TV Series (OVA, character designer)
- Visitor (character design)

=== 2000s ===
- Imomushi no Bōken (character design)
- WAN! (character design)

=== 2010s ===
- CoCO & NiCO (TV Series, Creator & Character Designer) 2016

== Digital media ==
=== Games ===
- Eien no Filena (Super Famicom, character designer)
- Kaeru no Ehon (character designer, in-game character illustrations)
- Kidō Keisatsu Patlabor (character designer)
- Magical Angel Creamy Mami (game jacket design, character designer)
- Magical Angel Creamy Mami: Futari no Rinbu (game jacket designer)
- Misa no Mahō Monogatari (PlayStation, character designer, tarot illustrations, guidebook illustrations)

=== Other ===
- Kidō Keisatsu Patlabor CD-ROM: Eyes (art collection)
- Magical Angel Creamy Mami and Magical Stage Fancy Lala CG Printout (part of the Pierrot Project)
- My Stella: Akemi Takada CD-ROM Digital Gallery (art collection)

== Exhibits and presentations ==
Listed by exhibit year and location.

- Fantasix (1988, Shinjuku Gallery Apea)
- Nine Art (1988, Ginza Rapōra)
- Odd Eye (1991, Shinjuku Gallery Apea)
- Takada Akemi Gengaten (1992, Hong Kong Arts Centre)
- Anime America (1995, San Jose, California)
- Noa-Future (1996, CG exhibition)
- Angels (1998, Studio Pierrot 20th Anniversary Exhibit)
- Modern Fantasy Artists (1999, Shiga Prefectural Modern Art Museum)
- Anime Expo (2000, Anaheim, California)
- L.A. Kikokuten (2000, Aoyama Animation Kobe)
- Project A-Kon (2000, Dallas, Texas)
- Rosette (2000, Kobe and Tokyo, Japan)
- Takada Akemi Ten (2000, personal exhibit in Taiwan)
- Character Design no Genba kara (2001, lecture)
- FANTA X (2001, Shiseidō The Ginza)
- Madoka (2001, Aoyama GoFa)
- Takada Akemi Gengaten (2001, Nagoya, Ōsaka, Harajuku)

== Other ==
- Angels (lithograph illustrations)
- Benesse Junior High 2nd Year Course Cover (illustration)
- Casual Angel (illustration)
- Catch Me! (FANTA X illustration)
- Chat with a Friend (official site illustration)
- Creamy Mami Again (Studio Pierrot Fair 2000 illustrations)
- Eien no Filena (CD jacket illustration)
- Forget Me Not (Megami Magazine pinup illustration)
- Hana (illustration)
- Hanayome (illustration)
- Haru no Seijaku (official site illustration)
- Itsuka no Yūgure (illustrations)
- Kaeru no Ehon (promotional illustrations)
- Kidō Keisatsu Patlabor: 100-manbon Toppa Kansha (illustration thanking fans for Patlabor manga selling 1 million volumes)
- Kidō Keisatsu Patlabor CD Box Deluxe (CD box cover illustration)
- Kidō Keisatsu Patlabor (DVD cover and box illustrations)
- Kidō Keisatsu Patlabor (game poster illustrations)
- Kidō Keisatsu Patlabor LD Box (LaserDisc box cover illustration)
- Kidō Keisatsu Patlabor New OVA Series Memorial Box (box set cover illustration)
- Kidō Keisatsu Patlabor TV Series Memorial Box (parts 1-2, box set cover illustrations)
- Kimagure Orange Road (CD box cover illustration)
- Kimagure Orange Road Memory Box (LaserDisc box cover illustration)
- Kimagure Orange Road Perfect Memorial on TV (box set cover illustration)
- Kimagure Orange Road: Singing Heart 2: Sweet Memories (CD box cover illustration)
- Koko ni Tsuite... (official site illustration, one of a series)
- Kyuukyoku Choujin R (album artwork)
- Kyuukyoku Choujin R vol.2 (album artwork)
- Kyuukyoku Choujin R Drama Special (album artwork)
- Love (original Valentine's Day illustration)
- Magical Angel Creamy Mami and Magical Stage Fancy Lala Cel Stencil Sheets
- Magical Angel Creamy Mami (DVD box cover illustration)
- Magical Angel Creamy Mami LD Box (vol.1-2, LaserDisc box cover illustration)
- Magical Angel Creamy Mami Perfect Memorial on TV (LaserDisc box cover illustration)
- Magical Angel Creamy Mami Triple Fantasy (LaserDisc box cover illustration)
- Magical Stage Fancy Lala (vol.1-8 LD jacket illustrations)
- Musashino (Kichijōji Station opening commemorative card illustration)
- PC Engine Fan (cover illustrations)
- Resurrection (character card illustration for MMTCG Resurrection)
- Sneaker Fair Campaign (ad campaign illustration)
- The Sneaker Special (ad campaign illustration, multiple times)
- Taikutsu na Tenshi-tachi (illustrations)
- Tropical Valentine (original illustration)
- Visitor (LD insert illustrations, CD cover illustrations)
- Yuki (official site illustration)
- Yume no Naka de (illustrations)
