= Leda: The Fantastic Adventure of Yohko =

1985 Japanese original video animation

幻夢戦記レダ (Genmu Senki Reda)
- Anime film
- Directed by: Kunihiko Yuyama
- Produced by: Akihiro Nagao
- Written by: Junki Takegami; Kunihiko Yuyama
- Music by: Shirō Sagisu
- Studio: Kaname Production
- Licensed by: NA: Right Stuf
- Released: March 1, 1985 (Video); December 21, 1985 (Theatrical)
- Runtime: 75 minutes
- Novel
- Written by: Hideyuki Kikuchi
- Illustrated by: Mutsumi Inomata
- Published by: Kodansha
- Published: May 1985

Leda: The Fantastic Adventure of Yohko (幻夢戦記レダ, Genmu Senki Reda) is a direct-to-video anime film released in Japan on March 1, 1985. It was also released in theaters on December 21, 1985.

The story is that of Yoko Asagiri who finds that the love song she wrote acted as a bridge transporting her to a fantastical alternate world called "Ashanti." There, the ruler of that world wants her song so that he could use it to open a doorway to Yoko's world and conquer it with his armies. Using the artifacts left behind by the legendary warrior Leda who prophesied her arrival, Yoko and her newfound friends must stop the tyrant's ambition and return both worlds to their proper place and balance.

== Plot ==
Yoko Asagiri composes a piano sonata to show her love to a young man. While listening to the song on a walkman she passes him but doesn't have the courage to confess. Then she is transported to a fantastical world. There she meets a talking dog. While talking to the dog, she sees off in the sky a reflection of her world. She then discovers that she can transport herself between the worlds while listening to the song. Then her walkman is stolen by strange men riding mechanical creatures who attack her. Yoko then transforms into a powerful sword wielding warrior and defeats them.

They meet a young girl named Yoni who explains that the floating castle, Garuba, nearby is ruled by Zell, an evil man using Leda's power for evil. He wishes to open a portal to the world of Noa to conquer it. Yoni leads her to a giant robot named the Armor of Leda that can transform into a ship called the Wings of Leda. Zell's floating towers attack and Yoni's giant robot, Rubber Star, is destroyed during the battle. Yoni and Yoko then fly to Zell's castle. They confront Zell, who erects a force field separating Yoko from her friends. Zell tells her that she came to this world because she wanted to escape from her world.

Zell captures her friends, and puts Yoko to sleep to use her to help control the portal machine. There Yoko dreams where she is dating the young man. Instead of walking past him, she started talking to him. When Yoko realizes her life with the boy she loves is nothing but an illusion, she breaks the spell, rescues her friends and the machine overloads. Zell, in anger lunges towards Yoko. Yoko stabs him, killing him. While the castle is destroyed Yoko and her friends escape. Yoko then returns to her world. Upon her return, she sees the boy and runs after him to talk to him.

== Voice actors ==
- Hiromi Tsuru - Asagiri Yōko
- Kei Tomiyama - Ringamu
- Chika Sakamoto - Yoni
- Shuichi Ikeda - Zell
- Mahito Tsujimura - Chizamu
- Naoko Watanabe - Omuka
- Kōji Totani - Soldier A
- Kōzō Shioya - Soldier B

== Staff ==
- Director: Kunihiko Yuyama
- Script: Junki Takegami, Kunihiko Yuyama
- Original Concept: Kaname Production
- Character Design: Mutsumi Inomata
- Art Director: Tadami Shimokawa
- Mechanical design: Takahiro Toyomasu
- Sound Director: Noriyoshi Matsuura
- Director of Photography: Shigerou Sugimura
- Animation Coordinator: Yōsei Morino

== Release ==
An English release of the film was acquired by The Right Stuf International in February 1997. It was officially released in North America on both subbed and dubbed VHS formats in May 1997. The OVA was republished on November 27, 2000 The company has yet to release the OVA on DVD in the region.

== Proposed sequel ==
Following the success of this film, plans were made to produce a second film, Genmu Senki Reda II (幻夢戦記レダII). Both Toho, a Japanese entertainment company along with King Records, a Japanese record company were both brought on board to do the film's music with Toho announcing the soundtrack in the form of an image single and an image album of the theme song "Yume no Maze" (Maze of Dreams in English) with the announcement "To be released in theaters in the summer of 1986" in promotion of the film.

However, due to the bankruptcy of Kaname Productions, the production has been placed on indefinite hold as there is no official word of its cancellation with only the main theme being finished.

== See also ==
- Hideyuki Kikuchi
- The Wing of Madoola
- Valis
