= Eternal Filena =

Media franchise

- Cover of volume 1 of the light novel series

永遠のフィレーナ (Eien no Firēna)
- Genre: Fantasy
- Light novel
- Written by: Takeshi Shudo
- Illustrated by: Akemi Takada
- Published by: Tokuma Shoten
- Magazine: Animage
- Original run: August 10, 1984 – April 1994
- Volumes: 9
- Original video animation
- Directed by: Yoshikata Nitta
- Produced by: Yukio Kikukawa; Michio Yoko
- Written by: Takeshi Shudo
- Music by: JINMO; Masanori Iimori
- Studio: Pierrot
- Released: December 21, 1992 – February 25, 1993
- Runtime: 30 minutes each
- Episodes: 6
- Video game
- Developer: Tokuma Shoten Intermedia
- Publisher: Tokuma Shoten
- Genre: Role-playing video game
- Platform: Super Famicom
- Released: February 25, 1995

Eternal Filena (永遠のフィレーナ, Eien no Firēna) is a fantasy light novel series written by Takeshi Shudo and illustrated by Akemi Takada, which was serialized in the Japanese anime and entertainment magazine Animage from 1984 to 1994. The series has been collected into nine volumes published by Tokuma Shoten. An OVA series based on the novels was released from 1992 to 1993. The novel series was also adapted into a role-playing video game released by Tokuma Shoten for the Super Famicom in 1995. It was only released commercially in Japan.

== Plot ==
Eternal Filena follows the adventures of Filena, the only survivor of the royal family in the ocean kingdom of Filosena which is destroyed by the ruling Devis Empire. Now part of the Empire's Clechia caste, slaves and second-rate citizens, Filena is raised as a boy by her adoptive grandfather Zenna so that she can be trained a battler, a warrior who takes part in gladiatorial styled games designed by the Empire to keep the masses happy. Filena befriends Lila, a slave assigned to be Filena's bed-mate before her first battler match, and sets off on a journey with Lila to free her homeland from tyranny and discover her true past.

== Characters ==
Filena (フィレーナ)
Voiced by: Arisa Andō
The main character of the series, she is a princess who was raised as a boy after her kingdom was conquered. She is a battler taught to fight at the age of six by her adoptive grandfather Zenna. She enters the battler fights to win her freedom but finds out later the fights are not what they appear. Upon learning her lineage Filena sets off on a journey with Lila to free her homeland from tyranny and discover her true past. Filena's personality is serious and straightforward, she frequently bickers with Lila but the two share a strong bond and as the story progresses the two develop a relationship.
Lila (リラ)
Voiced by: Yūko Mizutani
A slave assigned to be Filena's bed-mate before her first battler match, after Filena ignores her advances she laments that she will be punished for not performing her role which prompts Filena to tell Lila the truth about her gender, as well as cover for Lila so she will not be punished. Once Filena wins her first bout she requests to marry Lila so that Lila will not be made to be another battler's bed-mate. While their marriage is initially for Lila's protection, Lila quickly develops feelings for Filena and often refers to herself as Filena's wife. She is shown to get very emotional in moments of joy much to Filena's chagrin.
Zenna (ゼナ)
Voiced by: Yusaku Yara
One of the Filosena's royal guards. He is tasked by the king and queen to escape Filosena with their daughter Filena before the palace is sank into the ocean. Zenna goes on to act as Filena's adoptive grandfather and caretaker. He raises Filena as a boy, and teaches Filena how to fight at the age of 6 and become a battler.
Nest (ネスト)
Voiced by: Kenyu Horiuchi
A battle writer who writes the scripts for the battler fights to keep viewers interested and knows the Devis Empire inside and out. He was once engaged to Baraba's sister, however following her untimely death he turned to alcohol to drown his sorrows. He joins up with Filena and Lila on their journey after they are attacked by the Black Demons and decides to give up being a citizen of the Empire and become a rebel.
Milika (ミリカ)
Voiced by: Junko Asami
A woman whose husband Ficos enters the battler fights to provide for his family, and she has an infant son named Fis. Ficos loses to and is killed by Filena during their bout at Colosseum. Milika is shown to be a protective and caring person but she also has a vengeful side as she holds a grudge against Filena for killing her husband. Early on, Milika distrusts Filena and blinds her with poison as revenge killing her husband on orders by the empire. She also has several arguments with Lila. After, she is saved by Filena and Lila and Nest from a Black Demon attack, she eventually forgives Filena and makes up with them. Milika is a former dancer at a bar in Dora and her knowledge of dancing helps the trio get out of Delacina. Her appearance differs in the anime from the videogame, she has black hair and wears a lavender kimono in the anime and in the videogame wears a purple dress and has blonde hair.
Baraba (バラバ)
Voiced by: Hideyuki Hori
A battle writer who becomes interested in Filena after she wins her debut match. The death of his sister several years before the series begins continues to weigh heavily on his mind.
Sarah (サラ)
Voiced by: Ai Orikasa
Baraba's secretary, she is part of the slave class and is given little respect by Baraba who does not refer to her by her name.
Laris (ラリス)
A man who is the leader of a group of bandits who call the small mountain village Little Laritenia their home. Laris is a tall and muscular man with a distinctive scar on the right side of his face. Laris accompanies the group to the Laritenian Mine Shaft and helps Filena and Lila eliminate the threat of the Black Demons on their hideout. Laris is very protective of his town and people he cares about and he develops a bit of crush on Filena and knows she is a woman.
Amanela (アマネラ)
A woman who is the leader of the Amakune tribe where women rule over the men and she is accompanied her dog Gappy. She is portrayed as having a man's strength and a woman's kindness. She meets up with Filena and Lila on Eru Shulay beach. It is revealed during their exchange that she is pregnant. With help from Lila she eventually gives birth and thereafter joins the group to eliminate the threat of Clechia hunters on Mount Oligot.
Gappy (ギャッピー)
Amanela's trusted dog companion who is said to be a wolf dog hybrid. He is shown to be very protective of Amanela, and he quickly forms a strong bond with the party since Amanela trusts them. Amanela sends Gappy along with Filena and Lila after she decides that she can no longer fight with them due to the birth of her child.
Black Demon Baraba (黒い悪魔)
The Black Demons are the antagonists. They are the leaders of the Devis Empire that rules the land. The Black Demons are shown to be able to take the form of different people.
Fis (フィス)
Fis is Milika's son. He is an infant in the anime series and seven in the videogame. After his father loses to Filena, he is kidnapped by the empire and used for horrible experiments. These experiments lead to him advancing rapidly in age, becoming an adult and elite soldier of the Empire who swears revenge on Filena for killing his father and his mother.

== Media ==
=== Light novels ===
The light novel series was serialized in Animage from August 1984 to April 1994. Interior illustrations as well as cover artwork for the collected volumes were done by Akemi Takada, known for her work on series such as Kimagure Orange Road and Creamy Mami. The series was collected into nine volumes.

No.	Release date	ISBN
1	August 1, 1985	978-4196695479
2	May 1, 1986	978-4196695554
3	July 1, 1988	978-4196695882
4	June 1, 1990	978-4196696308
5	September 1, 1990	978-4196696377
6	April 1, 1992	978-4196696551
7	February 1, 1993	978-4196696667
8	November 1, 1993	978-4199000010
9	April 1, 1994	978-4199000140

=== Anime ===
A six-episode anime OVA series, with original character designs by Akemi Takada, was released by Tokuma Japan Communications from December 1992 through February 1993 at a rate of two 30-minute episode per month. It was directed by Yoshikata Nitta, with character designs by Kenzō Koizumi and art direction by Geki Katsumata. Series creator Takeshi Shudo noted in a column for Web Animation Magazine that the anime adaptation was initially planned to be 52 episodes, before being cut down to a 12 episode season, and then cut again to its final 6 episode OVA.

A soundtrack for the anime series was released on October 23, 1992, two months prior to the OVA series. The soundtrack was performed by guitarist Jinmo, with vocals for the opening theme song, Ocean, performed by Azumi Inoue.

==== Episode list ====
Ep.	Title	Directed by	Written by	Original release date
1	"Eternal Filena 1"; Transliteration: "Eien no Firēna 1" (Japanese: 永遠のフィレーナ1)	Naoto Hashimoto	Takeshi Shudo	December 21, 1992
2	"Eternal Filena 2"; Transliteration: "Eien no Firēna 2" (Japanese: 永遠のフィレーナ2)	Masahiro Hosoda	Takeshi Shudo	December 21, 1992
3	"Eternal Filena 3"; Transliteration: "Eien no Firēna 3" (Japanese: 永遠のフィレーナ3)	Yoshikata Nitta	Yasuko Hoshikawa	January 25, 1993
4	"Eternal Filena 4"; Transliteration: "Eien no Firēna 4" (Japanese: 永遠のフィレーナ4)	Akiyuki Shinbo	Yasuko Hoshikawa	January 25, 1993
5	"Eternal Filena 5"; Transliteration: "Eien no Firēna 5" (Japanese: 永遠のフィレーナ5)	Akiyuki Shinbo	Yasuko Hoshikawa	February 25, 1993
6	"Eternal Filena 6"; Transliteration: "Eien no Firēna 6" (Japanese: 永遠のフィレーナ6)	Hitoyuki Matsui	Yasuko Hoshikawa	February 25, 1993

=== Video game ===
A role-playing video game based on the series was first released on the Super Famicom in 1995 exclusive to Japan. The game was developed and published by Tokuma Shoten. Eternal Filena was published late into the Super Famicom's life, having initially been planned to release alongside the OVA, however delays pushed the game back two years from the OVA's release.

The game's story follows that of the light novels, in which Filena journeys with Lila to free her homeland from the tyranny of the Devis Empire and discover her true lineage as Filosena's lost princess. Some aspects from the light novels were not reflected in the game, such as the characters Baraba, Razzle or Tess not making appearances or periods of time when Filena and Lila were parted, instead having Lila as the only permanent party member among the other members who join and leave through the game.

The gameplay is typical of role-playing video games of its time, using a turn-based battle system with random encounters with monsters to gain experience and level up. Characters can equip up to three weapons and switch between them. Weapons have different abilities and a character can perform a technique at the cost of ability points.

== Reception ==
The series was popular enough to place in Animage polls for readers' all-time-favorite series as late as 1999.

On release, Famicom Tsūshin scored the game a 23 out of 40. Todd Ciolek's Anime News Network review noted that while the series began as a light novel and had an OVA adaptation, its relevance seems mostly tied to its video game released. Of the game, Ciolek noted that it played out much like any other RPG of the Super NES era and was only set apart by its supporting cast and the lesbian subtext of Filena and Lila's relationship. Ciolek surmised that the game "rarely lives up to its genre-defying promise, but there's still something intriguing there."
