= Kunihiko Yuyama =

Japanese director (born 1952)

- 湯山 邦彦
- Born: October 15, 1952 (age 74); Tokyo, Japan
- Occupation: Anime director
- Years active: 1977–present

Kunihiko Yuyama (湯山 邦彦, Yuyama Kunihiko; born October 15, 1952) is a Japanese director best known for his work on the Pokémon anime franchise. He also directed Magical Princess Minky Momo, Leda: The Fantastic Adventure of Yohko, The Three Musketeers Anime, Ushio and Tora, Kimagure Orange Road: Summer's Beginning, Plawres Sanshiro, Slayers Return, Slayers Great, and Wedding Peach.

== Career ==
Developing an interest in animation while still at high school, Yuyama worked as an animator's assistant on episodes of Space Battleship Yamato and Brave Raideen. He was a sketch artist and storyboard artist on the foreign co-production Barbapapa (1973) and joined Aoi Productions in 1978. The same year, he had his directorial debut while working for Aoi on Galaxy Express 999, and soon struck up a successful working partnership with the screenwriter Takeshi Shudo on GoShogun. In 1982, he promoted to "chief director", an overseeing role on Magical Princess Minky Momo. While remaining in TV during the 1980s, he also played a leading role in anime's exodus into video. His work also showed a mastery of elements for a female audience, most obvious in his Three Musketeers spin-off, Aramis' Adventure. After working on Ushio and Tora, he gained true fame through his involvement with later works on Pokémon.

== Filmography ==
=== Anime ===
List of production work in anime
Year	Title	Crew role	Notes	Source
1977	Ippatsu Kanta-kun	In-between animation		
1978–1981	Galaxy Express 999	Episode director		
1980	Zukkoke Knight - Don De La Mancha	Series director, Episode director, Storyboard		
1980	Space Warrior Baldios	Episode director, Storyboard		
1981	GoShogun	Director, Episode director, Storyboard	Also director, storyboard on 1982 film and 1985 Time Stranger OVA	
1982–83	Magical Princess Minky Momo	Series director, episode director, storyboard	Also OVAs and specials in 1985–1994	
1983	Plawres Sanshiro	Chief director, episode director, storyboard		
1985	Leda: The Fantastic Adventure of Yohko	Screenplay, Director	OVA, also released to theater	
1986	Windaria	Director		
1987	Tekkamen o Oue - D'Artagnan Monogatari yori 鉄仮面を追え「ダルタニャン物語」より	Director		
1987	TWD Express: Rolling Takeoff ja:TWD EXPRESS	Director	Also Rolling Takeout	
1987	The Three Musketeers Anime	Director, Episode director, storyboard		
1987	Fujikofujio no kiteretsudaihyakka 藤子不二雄のキテレツ大百科	Storyboard		
1989	The Three Musketeers Anime film	Director		
1989	Fujiko F Fujio no T P bon 藤子・F・不二雄のT・Pぼん	Director, Storyboard		
1989–90	Time Travel Tondekeman	Chief director, Episode director, storyboard		
1991	Slow Step	Director		
1992	Ushio and Tora	Director	Also OVAs in 1993.	
1993	Apfel Land Story ja:アップフェルラント物語	Director	OVA	
1993	Yaiba	General director		
1995	Jura Tripper	Director		
1995–96	Wedding Peach	Director	Also OVA 1996	
1995	Kōryū no Mimi	Director		
1995	Weather Report Girl	Screenplay, Director	OVA	
1996	Slayers Return	General director		
1996	Shin Kimagure Orange Road: Summer's Beginning	Director		
1997	Kougyou aika volley boys ja:工業哀歌バレーボーイズ	Director	OVA	
1997–2019	Pokémon	General director	Also OVAs, specials, spinoffs, shorts	
1997	Slayers Great	General director		
1998	Pokémon: The First Movie	Director, Storyboard	Also director on Pikachu's Vacation	
1999	Pokémon: The Movie 2000	Director, Storyboard	Also director on Pikachu's Rescue Adventure	
2000	Pokémon 3: The Movie	Director		
2001	Pokémon 4Ever	Director	Also director on short	
2002	Pokémon Heroes	Director	Also director on short	
2002	Pokémon Chronicles	Director	spin-off show	
2003	Pokémon: Jirachi Wish Maker	Director	Also director on short	
2004	Pokémon: Destiny Deoxys	Director		
2005	Pokémon: Lucario and the Mystery of Mew	Director		
2006	Pokémon Ranger and the Temple of the Sea	Director		
2007	Pokémon: The Rise of Darkrai	Director		
2008	Pokémon: Giratina and the Sky Warrior	Director		
2009	Pokémon: Arceus and the Jewel of Life	Director		
2010	Pokémon: Zoroark: Master of Illusions	Director		
2011	Pokémon the Movie: Black—Victini and Reshiram and White—Victini and Zekrom	Director	Also director on short	
2012	Pokémon the Movie: Kyurem vs. the Sword of Justice	Director	Also director on short	
2013	Pokémon the Movie: Genesect and the Legend Awakened	Director	Also director on short	
2014	Pokémon the Movie: Diancie and the Cocoon of Destruction	Director, Storyboard	Also director on short	
2015	Pokémon the Movie: Hoopa and the Clash of Ages	General director, storyboard	Also director on short	
2016	Pokémon the Movie: Volcanion and the Mechanical Marvel	Director, Storyboard		
2016	Rudolf the Black Cat	Director		
2017	Pokémon the Movie: I Choose You!	Director		
2019	Mewtwo Strikes Back: Evolution	Director		
2022	PuniRunes	Chief director		
2024	Sai-Kyo-Oh! Zukan: The Ultimate Battles	Chief director		
2024	PuniRunes Puni 2	Chief director		

=== Live-action ===
List of production work in live-action shows
Year	Title	Crew role	Notes	Source
	Keitai Sōsakan 7	Episode director	TV drama	
