= Ashi Productions =

Japanese animation studio

Ashi Productions Co., Ltd.
- Native name: 株式会社葦プロダクション
- Romanized name: Kabushiki-gaisha Ashi Purodakushon
- Formerly: Ashi Productions Co., Ltd. (1975–2007); Production Reed Co., Ltd. (2007–2019)
- Type: Private
- Industry: Japanese animation; Character licensing
- Founded: December 20, 1975; 50 years ago
- Founder: Toshihiko Sato
- Headquarters: Ogikubo, Suginami, Tokyo, Japan
- Key people: Toshihiko Sato (chairman); Hiroya Sato (president)
- Owner: Employee owned
- Website: ashipro.jp

Ashi Productions Co., Ltd (Japanese: 株式会社葦プロダクション, Hepburn: Kabushiki-gaisha Ashi Purodakushon) is a Japanese animation studio, located in Suginami, Tokyo, Japan, known for its four magical-girl animation, especially Magical Princess Minky Momo. It was established by Toshihiko Sato and other artists on December 20, 1975, as Ashi Productions. It changed its name from Ashi Productions to Production Reed Co., Ltd. (株式会社プロダクション リード) on November 1, 2007. On February 12, 2019, the company changed its name back to Ashi Productions.

== History ==
As a latecomer, the company struggled to secure broadcast slots. It was forced to use the Nippon Animation banner to broadcast its first three works, Blocker Corps IV: Machine Blaster, Super Combined Magical Robot Gingaizer, and Her Majesty's Petit Ange. The four works from Josefina the Whale to Space Warrior Baldios were co-produced with Kokusai Eigasha instead of Nippon Animation, and from Sengoku Majin GoShogun onwards, the company became an independent production company.

Although Ashi Productions mainly produce original projects, it also produces a few original works. Since its departure from the Wiz Group, the proportion of anime based on original works has increased in the 2010s.

In November 2001, the company underwent a significant capital increase and became a subsidiary of the Bandai Group, later known as the Bandai Namco Group. At the end of 2005, the company's capital was reduced again to 10 million yen, and Bandai withdrew its capital.

On January 20, 2006, the company entered into a business partnership with Wiz, a toy planning and development company under the Bandai Namco Group, and on November 1, 2007, the company name was changed to Production Reed Co., Ltd. As a result, Sato was promoted to Representative Director and Chairman, and Takekazu Hongo was appointed Representative Director and President.

On May 20, 2009, all of Wiz's shares were transferred to Sato, and the company withdrew from the Wiz Group, as no synergy effects could be expected with Wiz, as they were focusing on the planning, development, and manufacturing of toys.

On February 12, 2019, the company name was changed again to Ashi Productions Co., Ltd.

In June 2025, the Tokyo Labor Bureau of the Ministry of Health, Labour and Welfare announced that Ashi Productions had fraudulently obtained both employment adjustment and emergency employment stabilization subsidies by submitting false documentation claiming that the company's business operations had been suspended. As of that year, the subsidies received - which totaled approximately 50 million yen - had not been repaid.

== TV series ==
- Blocker Gundan 4 Machine Blaster (1976-1977, co-production with Nippon Animation)
- Chogattai Majutsu Robo Ginguiser (1977, co-production with Nippon Animation)
- Angie Girl (1977–1978)
- Josephina the Whale (1979, co-production with Kokusai Eiga-sha)
- Zukkoke Knight - Don De La Mancha (1980, co-production with Kokusai Eiga-sha)
- Monchhichi Twins (1980, co-production with Kokusai Eiga-sha)
- Space Warrior Baldios (1980–1981, co-production with Kokusai Eiga-sha)
- GoShogun (1981)
- Magical Princess Minky Momo (1982–1983)
- Special Armored Battalion Dorvack (1983–1984)
- Dancouga – Super Beast Machine God (1985)
- Machine Robo: Revenge of Cronos (1986–1987)
- Machine Robo: Battle Hackers (1987)
- Ironfist Chinmi (1988)
- Doctor Chichibuyama (1988)
- Sonic Soldier Borgman (1988)
- Idol Densetsu Eriko (1989–1990)
- Time Travel Tondekeman (1989–1990, co-production with Tatsunoko Production)
- Idol Angel Yokoso Yoko (1990–1991)
- NG Knight Ramune & 40 (1990-1991)
- Magical Angel Sweet Mint (1990–1991)
- Jankenman (1991–1992)
- Magical Princess Minky Momo: Hold on to Your Dreams (1991–1992)
- Floral Magician Mary Bell (1992–1993)
- Free Kick (1992–1993)
- Macross 7 (1994–1995)
- Blue Seed (1994–1995, co-production with Production I.G)
- Jura Tripper (1995)
- H2 (1995-1996)
- The Legend of Zorro (1996–1997)
- VS Knight Lamune & 40 Fire (1996)
- Beast Wars II: Super Life-Form Transformers (1998)
- All Purpose Cultural Cat Girl Nuku Nuku (1998)
- Gandalla (1998)
- Cyber Team in Akihabara (1998, co-production with Gansis)
- Cybuster (1999)
- Super Life-Form Transformers: Beast Wars Neo (1999)
- Offside (2001–2002)
- F-Zero GP Legend (2003–2004)
- Ultra Maniac (2003)
- Jūsō Kikō Dancouga Nova (2007)
- Onsen Yōsei Hakone-chan (2015, co-production with Asahi Production)
- Rainbow Days (2016)
- In Another World with My Smartphone (2017)
- Cutie Honey Universe (2018)
- The Tale of the Outcasts (2023)
- 365 Days to the Wedding (2024)
- How I Attended an All-Guy's Mixer (2024)
- The Holy Grail of Eris (2026)
- An Observation Log of My Fiancée Who Calls Herself a Villainess (2026)

== TV specials ==
- Attention Students! A Green Neckerchief for Your Hearts (February 23, 1986)

== OVAs ==
- Dancouga: Requiem for Victims (1986)
- Dancouga: Jūsenkitai Songs (1986)
- Violence Jack: Harem Bomber (1986)
- God Bless Dancouga (1987)
- Makyō Gaiden La Deus (1987)
- Magical Princess Minky Momo Hitomi no Seiza Minky Momo SONG Special (1987)
- Leina: Wolf Sword Legend (1988–1989)
- Dancouga: Blazing Epilogue (1989–1990)
- Machine Robo: Battle Field Memories (1989)
- Lightning Trap: Leina & Laika (1990)
- Gadurine (1990)
- Camelot of Love and Sword (1990)
- NG Knight Lamune & 40 Summary (1990)
- NG Knight Lamune & 40 EX (1991)
- Tinkerbell After School (1992)
- Floral Magician Mary Bell: Mary Bell's Traffic Safety (1993)
- Floral Magician Mary Bell: Mary Bell's Fire Prevention: What to Do When an Earthquake Occurs (1993)
- Mega Man: Upon a Star (1993)
- NG Knight Lamune & 40 DX (1993)
- Idol Defense Force Hummingbird (1993)
- Humming Bird: Summer 1994 (1994)
- Magical Princess Minky Momo: In the Station of Your Memories (1994)
- Iria: Zeiram the Animation (1994)
- New Cutie Honey (1994, episode 3)
- Humming Bird: Song of the Wind (1995)
- Humming Bird: The Space of Your Dream (1995)
- Apocalypse Zero (1996)
- Jewel BEM Hunter Lime (1996–1997)
- Macross Dynamite 7 (1997–1998)
- Knights of Ramune (1997)
- All Purpose Cultural Cat Girl Nuku Nuku DASH! (1998)
- Kirara (2000)
- Ultra Maniac (2002)
- Futari Ecchi (2014)
- Jewelpet Attack Travel! (2022)
- Magical Princess Minky Momo: A Duo of Sincerity Toward a Dream of Longing (TBA)

== Theatrical projects ==
- Space Warrior Baldios (co-production with Kokusai Eiga-sha) (1981)
- GoShogun Movie (1982)
- GoShogun: The Time Étranger (1985)
- Magical Princess Minky Momo La Ronde in my Dream (1985)
- Vampire Hunter D (1985)
- Grey: Digital Target (1986)
- Ai City (1986)
- Ultraman: The Adventure Begins (1987)
- Sonic Soldier Borgman: The Final Battle (1989)
- Sonic Soldier Borgman: Lover's Rain (1990)
- Floral Magician Mary Bell: The Key Of Phoenix (1992)
- Jankenman: The Great Monster Battle (1992)
- Beast Wars II: Lio Convoy's Close Call! (1998)

== Outsourced productions ==
- Gigi and the Fountain of Youth (English dub of Magical Princess Minky Momo La Ronde in my Dream film by Harmony Gold) (1985)
- M.A.S.K. (American production, with DiC Entertainment; various first and second-season episodes) (1985–1986)
- Macron 1 (U.S./European version of GoShogun by Saban International, the U.S. version also incorporates scenes from Akū Dai Sakusen Srungle produced by Kokusai Eiga-sha.) (1986)
- Mega Man (American production, with Ruby-Spears Productions) (1993)
- Skysurfer Strike Force (American production, with Ruby-Spears Productions) (1995–1996)
- Diabolik (American production, with Saban International) (1997)
