= Plawres Sanshiro =

Japanese manga series

- Cover of the first DVD volume

プラレス3四郎 (Puraresu Sanshirō)
- Genre: Mecha, martial arts, sports
- Manga
- Written by: Jirō Gyū
- Published by: Akita Shoten
- Magazine: Weekly Shōnen Champion
- Original run: 1982 – 1985
- Volumes: 14
- Anime television series
- Directed by: Kunihiko Yuyama
- Produced by: Isao Onuki; Yoshirō Kataoka
- Written by: Keisuke Fujikawa
- Music by: Yasunori Tsuchida
- Studio: Kaname Production
- Original network: TBS
- Original run: June 5, 1983 – February 26, 1984
- Episodes: 37

Plawres Sanshiro (プラレス3四郎, Puraresu Sanshirō) is a Japanese manga series written by Jirō Gyū and illustrated by Minoru Kamiya. It was serialized in the Akita Shoten magazine Weekly Shōnen Champion from 1982 to 1985. An anime television series adaptation was broadcast from 1983 to 1984. The name is a shortened derivative of "Plastic Model Wrestling Sanshiro" and the visuals of the characters, in particular the PlaWrestler robots, were different from the manga.

== Overview ==
The story is about a young boy named Sanshiro Sugata and his miniature PlaWrestler pocket robot with super LSI circuit named Juohmaru. Initially, the show was about Sanshiro's battles with Juohmaru against other PlaWrestlers in robot battle tournaments that were a hybrid blend of modern professional wrestling, hi-tech robot wars and Japanese noh theatre.

As the series went on, its focus shifted to Sanshiro exploring the possible uses of PlaWrestling technology in medical implants, and his clash against those who wished to use it for military purposes instead.

== Characters ==
=== Sanshiro's group ===
Sanshiro Sugata (素形三四郎, Sugata Sanshirō) Voiced by: Satomi Majima

Sanshiro is the series' protagonist and a PlaWres modeler. His PlaWrestler, Juohmaru (柔王丸 Jūōmaru), is custom-made. Initially, Sanshiro is an ambitious rookie, and his overconfidence and brashness leads to several mistakes. As the series, progresses, Sanshiro learns to think more rationally and care for others.

Kyoko Fubuki (吹雪今日子, Fubuki Kyōko) Voiced by: Arisa Andō

Kyoko is Sanshiro's friend and later love interest. She is an assistant judo instructor at the Sugata family dojo. An energetic and outspoken girl, she does not hesitate to scold Sanshiro whenever he makes a mistake. Her PlaWrestler is (桜姫, Sakurahime).

Shota Yamaguchi (山口章太, Yamaguchi Shōta) Voiced by: Noriko Tsukase

Shota is Sanshiro's best friend, whose job is collecting information of any kind, particularly on rival modelers. Shota is hyperactive, flirtatious, a loudmouth and quick to judge on first impressions. However, he takes his duties seriously.

Tetsuya Hasegawa (長谷川哲也, Hasegawa Tetsuya) Voiced by: Naoki Ryuta

Tetsuya is Juohmaru's mechanic, responsible for fine tuning him, upgrading him and repairing him. He is shown to be very capable, a quick thinker and an innovator, although at times he has taken offence at Sanshiro overriding him for Juohmaru's maintenance.

Shinji Murao (村尾伸次, Murao Shinji) Voiced by: Kaneto Shiozawa

Shinji is Juohmaru's programmer. His code, along with Sanshiro's manual control, guides Juohmaru in the battle ring. Like Tetsuya, Shinji is portrayed to be good at his job and a cool thinker compared to Sanshiro and Shota.

=== Sanshiro's family ===
Kennosuke Sugata (素形健之介, Sugata Kennosuke) Voiced by: Hidekatsu Shibata

Sanshiro's grandfather and judo master of the local dojo. Kennosuke is initially critical of Sanshiro's PlaWrestling exploits, preferring him to practice judo and eventually succeed him as dojo master instead. Eventually, Sanshiro's success and determination convince Kennosuke to let him pursue his own dreams.

Kaoru Sugata (素形薫, Sugata Kaoru) Voiced by: Akiko Inose

Sanshiro's mother. Kaoru seems to be somewhat aloof, which makes her a foil for Kennosuke when discussing about Sanshiro. Despite her impression of naivety, she occasionally exhibits moments of profound insight, attributing them to her "maternal instinct".

Machiko Sugata (素形真知子, Sugata Machiko) Voiced by: Chieko Honda

Sanshiro's little sister. Machiko is a lively child who supports Sanshiro in his endeavours. Despite her small age, she is prone to making surprisingly intelligent remarks to many of her elders.

Kenichiro Sugata (素形健一郎, Sugata Ken'ichirō)

Sanshiro's late father, whose research created PlaWrestling. His attempts to use it for the benefit of mankind met with resistance from arms dealers who wished to use it as a means of warfare. Kenichiro ended up dead in a suspicious accident. After learning this, Sanshiro resolved to use PlaWrestling to complete his father's research.

=== Antagonists ===
José Garcia

The main antagonist, a ruthless arms dealer who manipulates the PlaWrestling scene worldwide by funding and bribing its officials. He tries to exploit PlaWrestling technology to develop robotic super-soldiers. It is implied he is responsible for the accident that took the life of Sanshiro's father.

Ballesteros

Chairman of the World PlaWresting Association (WPWA) and henchman to José Garcia. A man who manipulates the Association, its Japanese branch (JPWA) and the Fighting-type Modeler League to further Garcia's ends.

Sheila Misty (シーラ・ミスティ) Voiced by: Yō Inoue

An enigmatic woman who spies on Sanshiro and manipulates events to force him to give up PlaWrestling. She works for José Garcia, who has convinced her that he will heal her brother Mash's legs. After she realises Garcia's deception, Sheila becomes an ally of Sanshiro.

Gendou Kurosaki (黒崎玄剛, Kurosaki Gendō) Voiced by: Takeshi Watabe

Boisterous and self-important, Kurosaki is Japan's national PlaWrestling champion for three consecutive years and the region's foremost Fighting-Type modeler, following the philosophy of winning at any cost. He becomes a fierce rival of Sanshiro after he loses to him in the first episode. Later on, Kurosaki becomes more sympathetic after seeing the troubles Sanshiro has to overcome and ends up his ally.

=== Other characters ===
Cynog Narita (成田シノグ, Narita Shinogu) Voiced by: Tōru Furuya

The region's foremost Hobby-type modeler, viewing PlaWrestling as a contest of skill and placing the well-being of one's PlaWrestler above winning. Narita is down-to-earth, intelligent, collected and has the respect of Sanshiro and his team, but his attitude sometimes makes him take things too seriously and appear cold and distant. Narita's PlaWrestler is called Ikaros Wing.

Dr. Warmer

A colleague of Sanshiro's father, Dr. Warmer helped develop PlaWrestling technology. After telling Sanshiro of his father's desire to use PlaWrestling to help the disabled, Sanshiro gathers data from Juohmaru's battles and sends them to him. Dr. Warmer analyses this data and eventually comes up with a novel technology that relies on brain wave induction to restore a person's mobility.

== DVD release ==
Six Plawres Sanshiro DVDs are available spanning 37 episodes at 25 minutes each.

Plawres Sanshiro Vol.1 – Episode 1,2

Plawres Sanshiro Vol.2 – Episode 3 - 9

Plawres Sanshiro Vol.3 – Episode 10 - 16

Plawres Sanshiro Vol.4 – Episode 17 - 23

Plawres Sanshiro Vol.5 – Episode 24 - 30

Plawres Sanshiro Vol.6 – Episode 31 - 37

== Episodes ==
#	Air Date	Episodes title (names translated from Japanese)	Episodes title (Japanese)
1	June 5, 1983	Juohmaru, This is Plawrestling!!	柔王丸・これがプラレスだ!!
2	June 12, 1983	Death Match! Kurosaki VS. Sanshiro	デスマッチ・黒崎VS3四郎!!
3	June 19, 1983	The Majin, Power Attack	ザ・魔神 パワーアタック!!
4	June 26, 1983	Take That! Fireball Attack!	受けてみろ 火の玉チャレンジ
5	July 3, 1983	Danger! Sanshiro Is In Big Trouble	あぶない!3四郎危機一髪!!
6	July 10, 1983	Finally! Female Plawrestler!	ついに出た!女子プラレスラー!!
7	July 17, 1983	Tekkamen, the Assassin Lullaby of the death	暗殺者鉄仮面!?死の子守唄!!
8	July 24, 1983	Beat the rival!! Narita VS. Sanshiro!!	ライバルを倒せ!!成田VS3四郎!!
9	July 31, 1983	Mad Hurricane's revenge!! Stand up, Juohmaru!!	復讐のマッドハリケーン!!立て柔王丸!!
10	August 7, 1983	Crash!! Skateboard kid Challenger from Hawaii!!	激突!!スケボーキッド ハワイからのチャレンジャー!!
11	August 14, 1983	Knock Down Matador! Get Angry, Juohmaru!!	必殺のマタドール!怒れ柔王丸!!
12	August 21, 1983	Killing Stardust! Targeted Juohmaru!!	殺しのスターダスト!狙われた柔王丸!!
13	August 28, 1983	Plawres Wars! Juohmaru Aims Championship!!	プラレスウォーズ!チャンプをめざせ柔王丸!!
14	September 4, 1983	Fateful Rivals! Hard Crash, Juohmaru!!	宿命のライバル!激闘柔王丸!!
15	September 11, 1983	Strong Opponent! Kung-Fu Vs. Juohmaru!!	強敵出現!カンフーVS柔王丸!!
16	September 18, 1983	Dueling In Georama City! Juohmaru, 2 Vs. 1!!	決闘ジオラマシティー!柔王丸2対1!!
17	September 25, 1983	Beautiful Challenger! Juohmaru, Dance of the Beast!!	華麗なるチャレンジャー!柔王丸獣の舞!!
18	October 2, 1983	Highway Battle! Desperate Juohmaru!!	ハイウェイバトル!決死の柔王丸!!
19	October 9, 1983	A New Sunrise! Come back alive, Juohmaru!!	新たなる夜明け!甦れ柔王丸!!
20	October 16, 1983	Heart & Machine!! Juohmaru! The Long Way!	ハート&マシーン!!柔王丸!遥かなる道!
21	October 23, 1983	Trap of the Space Shuttle! Fly to the Cosmos, Juohmaru!!	スペースシャトルの罠!宇宙に翔べ柔王丸!!
22	October 30, 1983	Kurosaki, desperate challenge! Survive, Juohmaru!!	黒崎執念の挑戦!生き残れるか柔王丸!!
23	November 6, 1983	Plawrestling war! Be the star of Asia, Juohmaru!!	プラレス大戦争!アジアに輝け柔王丸!!
24	November 13, 1983	A tower of execution! Juohmaru, fight with anger!!	処刑の塔!柔王丸怒りをこめて戦え!!
25	November 27, 1983	The champion from America! Juohmaru, departure for tomorrow!!	アメリカから来たチャンプ!柔王丸明日への旅立ち!!
26	December 4, 1983	Juohmaru! A midday western fight!!	柔王丸!真昼のウエスタンファイト!!
27	December 11, 1983	Juohmaru! Run for tomorrow!!	柔王丸!明日に向かって走れ!!
28	December 18, 1983	The night of evil! Tear the darkness, Juohmaru!!	悪魔の夜!柔王丸,闇を裂け!!
29	December 25, 1983	A stage of death! Awaken, Juohmaru!!	死のステージ!目覚めよ!柔王丸!!
30	January 8, 1984	Juohmaru! Oath for tomorrow!!	柔王丸!明日への誓い!!
31	January 15, 1984	Juohmaru! Glowing Plawrestling spirit!!	柔王丸!燃えるプラレス魂!!
32	January 22, 1984	Enemy plane over! Jump over Juohmaru!!	頭上の敵機!跳べ柔王丸!!
33	January 29, 1984	This is brain wave induction! Run softly Juohmaru!!	これが脳波誘導だ!走れ柔王丸!!
34	February 5, 1984	Juohmaru! Road to champion!!	柔王丸!チャンプへの道!!
35	February 12, 1984	Juohmaru! It is the day when the world changes!!	柔王丸!世界が変わる日だ!!
36	February 19, 1984	Juohmaru! Plawrestling Eternally!!	柔王丸!プラレスよ永遠に!!
37	February 26, 1984	Juohmaru! Soldier is wanted! Last time!!	柔王丸!希望の戦士!!

== See also ==
- Plamo-Kyoshiro
