= Magical Princess Minky Momo =

Japanese magical girl anime franchise

- Promotional art for the second anime series

魔法のプリンセス ミンキー モモ (Mahō no Purinsesu Minkī Momo)
- Genre: Magical girl
- Created by: Takeshi Shudo
- Anime television series
- Directed by: Kunihiko Yuyama
- Produced by: Minoru Ōno (Yomiko); Hiroshi Katō; Masaru Umehara
- Written by: Takeshi Shudo
- Music by: Hiroshi Takada
- Studio: Ashi Productions
- Licensed by: Crunchyroll
- Original network: MegaTON (TV Tokyo)
- English network: AU: Network Ten
- Original run: March 18, 1982 – May 26, 1983
- Episodes: 63
- Original video animation

Long Goodbye: Mahō no Tenshi Creamy Mami VS Mahō no Princess Minky Momo Gekijou no Daikessen
- Directed by: Mochizuki Tomomichi
- Studio: Studio Pierrot
- Released: June 15, 1985
- Original video animation

Magical Princess Minky Momo La Ronde in my Dream
- Directed by: Kunihiko Yuyama
- Produced by: US: Harmony Gold U.S.A. Inc.
- Studio: Ashi Productions
- Released: July 28, 1985
- Runtime: 81 minutes
- Original video animation

Magical Princess Minky Momo Hitomi no Seiza Minky Momo SONG Special
- Directed by: Kunihiko Yuyama
- Studio: Ashi Productions
- Released: January 21, 1987
- Anime television series

Magical Princess Minky Momo: Hold on to Your Dreams
- Directed by: Kunihiko Yuyama
- Produced by: Tōru Horikoshi (NTV); Minoru Ōno (Yomiko Advertising); Hiroshi Katō; Masaru Umehara
- Written by: Takeshi Shudo; Akemi Omode (assistant)
- Music by: Tomoki Hasegawa
- Studio: Ashi Productions
- Licensed by: Crunchyroll
- Original network: NNS (NTV)
- Original run: October 2, 1991 – December 23, 1992
- Episodes: 62+3
- Original video animation

Minky Momo in The Bridge Over Dreams
- Directed by: Kunihiko Yuyama
- Written by: Takeshi Shudo; Akemi Omode
- Music by: Tomoki Hasegawa
- Studio: Studio Junio
- Released: May 23, 1993
- Runtime: 40 minutes
- Original video animation

Minky Momo in The Station of Your Memories
- Directed by: Kunihiko Yuyama
- Written by: Takeshi Shudo
- Music by: Tomoki Hasegawa
- Studio: Studio Live
- Released: June 22, 1994
- Runtime: 30 minutes
- Manga

Miracle Dream Minky Momo
- Written by: Yamabe Yoshina
- Published by: Shogakukan
- Magazine: Shōgaku Ninensei
- Original run: April 2004 – March 2005
- Original video animation

Magical Princess Minky Momo: A Duo of Sincerity Toward a Dream of Longing
- Directed by: Ayumu Watanabe
- Written by: Deko Akao
- Music by: Tomoki Hasegawa
- Studio: Ashi Productions

Magical Princess Minky Momo (魔法のプリンセス ミンキー モモ, Mahō no Purinsesu Minkī Momo) is a Japanese magical girl anime franchise by Ashi Productions. The original series ran between 1982 and 1983 on TV Tokyo and inspired three OVAs between 1985 and 1987. A second television series, titled Magical Princess Minky Momo: Hold on to Your Dreams (魔法のプリンセスミンキーモモ 夢を抱きしめて, Mahō no Purinsesu Minkī Momo: Yume o Dakishimete), ran on NTV between 1991 and 1992, and like the original, it spawned home video follow-ups. A third Momo series began in 2004, this time as a manga titled Miracle Dream Minky Momo (みらくる・ドリーム ミンキーモモ, Mirakuru Dorīmu Minkī Momo) in Shogakukan's Shōgaku Ninensei magazine.

In 2006, writer Takeshi Shudo expressed interest in making a third Momo anime television series. In 2009, Ashi Productions announced a new Momo production, but it has not yet surfaced; this is likely due to Shudo's death in 2010. A new original video animation, titled Magical Princess Minky Momo: A Duo of Sincerity Toward a Dream of Longing (魔法のプリンセスミンキーモモ 憧れの夢へ まごころの二重奏, Mahō no Purinsesu Minkī Momo: Akogare no Yume e Magokoro no Duo), has been announced.

== Story ==
Momo is a princess of Fenarinarsa (フェナリナーサ, Fenarināsa), "the land of dreams in the sky". Fenarinarsa is a dwelling place for fairy tale characters. It was in danger of leaving Earth's orbit and disappearing, because people on the planet lost their dreams and hopes.

The king and queen of Fenarinarsa sent their daughter Momo to Earth to help the people regain them. Momo became the daughter of a young childless couple, accompanied by three followers with the appearance of a dog (Sindbook), a monkey (Mocha) and a bird (Pipil).

On Earth, Momo takes the appearance of an 8 to 10-year-old girl. To help the planet regain its hopes and dreams, Momo transforms into an adult version of herself, with an occupation tailored to fit whatever situation she encounters.

Each time Momo succeeds in bringing happiness to the person affected, the Fenarinarsa crown shines. When it shines four times, a jewel appears in the crown. Once 12 jewels appear, Fenarinarsa will return to Earth.

Later in the series, Momo's task is left incomplete as she ends up losing her powers. Soon thereafter, she is killed by a collision with a truck full of toys. She is reincarnated as a baby, the real daughter of the couple on Earth.

== Media ==
=== 1982 TV series ===
The first anime television series, Magical Princess Minky Momo, premiered on March 18, 1982, and concluded on May 26, 1983, on TV Tokyo after 63 episodes. The series inspired a crossover short film with Studio Pierrot's Creamy Mami, the Magic Angel called Long Goodbye: Magical Angel Creamy Mami VS Magical Princess Minky Momo Decisive Theatrical Battle (魔法のプリンセスミンキーモモVS魔法の天使クリィミーマミ 劇場の大決戦, Mahō no Purinsesu Minkī Momo VS Mahō no Tenshi Kuryimī Mami Gekijō no Daisakusen) that was released on June 15, 1985, attached to the latter's theatrical film. The following month, a Peter Pan-themed OVA named Magical Princess Minky Momo: La Ronde in my Dream (魔法のプリンセスミンキーモモ 夢の中の輪舞, Mahō no Purinsesu Minkī Momo: Yume no Naka no Rinbu) was released in Japan. In January 1987, Ashi released an animated music video titled Magical Princess Minky Momo: Hitomi no Seiza Minky Momo Song Special (魔法のプリンセスミンキーモモ 瞳の星座ミンキーモモSONGスペシャル, Mahō no Purinsesu Minkī Momo: Hitomi no Seiza Minkī Momo Song Supesharu).

No.	Title	Original release date
1	"Love Love Minky Momo"; Transliteration: "Rabu Rabu Minkī Momo" (Japanese: ラブラブ·ミンキーモモ)	March 18, 1982
2	"Charm Up with Glasses"; Transliteration: "Megane de Chāmu Appu" (Japanese: メガネでチャームアップ)	March 25, 1982
3	"Run, Super Rider"; Transliteration: "Hashire Sūpā Raidā" (Japanese: 走れスーパーライダー)	April 1, 1982
4	"The Boy Saw the Blue Bird"; Transliteration: "Aoi Tori o Mita Shōnen" (Japanese: 青い鳥をみた少年)	April 8, 1982
5	"The Bratty Prince: Great Free-For-All-Fight"; Transliteration: "Warugaki Ōji Dai Konsen" (Japanese: ワルガキ王子大混戦)	April 15, 1982
6	"Red Roses in the Tennis Court"; Transliteration: "Tenisukōto ni Akai Bara" (Japanese: テニスコートに赤いバラ)	April 22, 1982
7	"The Beloved Nightingale"; Transliteration: "Naichingēru wa Osuki" (Japanese: ナイチンゲールはお好き)	April 29, 1982
8	"Heart-Breaking Female Police Officer"; Transliteration: "Fujin Keikantte Tsurai no Ne" (Japanese: 婦人警官ってつらいのネ)	May 6, 1982
9	"Music Festival in The Forest"; Transliteration: "Mori no Ongakusai" (Japanese: 森の音楽祭)	May 13, 1982
10	"Great Pursuit on a Highway"; Transliteration: "Haiuei Dai Tsuiseki" (Japanese: ハイウエイ大追跡)	May 20, 1982
11	"Kitten, the Lovely Beauty Artist"; Transliteration: "Koi no Biyōshi yo Koneko-chan" (Japanese: 恋の美容師よ小猫ちゃん)	May 27, 1982
12	"Mysterious Thief Lupin: Great Counterattack"; Transliteration: "Kaitō Rupin Dai Hangeki" (Japanese: 怪盗ルピン大反撃)	June 3, 1982
13	"The Magician and the 11 Boys"; Transliteration: "Majutsushi to Jūichi-nin no Shōnen" (Japanese: 魔術師と11人の少年)	June 10, 1982
14	"The Racecar Driver Receives the Goal"; Transliteration: "Gōru wa Itadaki Gekisō Rēsā" (Japanese: ゴールはいただき激走レーサー)	June 17, 1982
15	"The Speeding Train Won't Stop"; Transliteration: "Bōsō Ressha ga Tomaranai" (Japanese: 暴走列車が止まらない)	June 24, 1982
16	"Minky Momo in a Wilderness"; Transliteration: "Kōya no Minkī Momo" (Japanese: 荒野のミンキーモモ)	July 1, 1982
17	"Love Attack at the Haunted Mansion"; Transliteration: "Obake Yashiki de Rabu Atakku" (Japanese: おばけ屋敷でラブアタック)	July 8, 1982
18	"The Treasure of the Southern Island"; Transliteration: "Minami no Shima no Hihō" (Japanese: 南の島の秘宝)	July 15, 1982
19	"Mechanized Fenarinarsa"; Transliteration: "Kikai Jikake no Fenarināsa" (Japanese: 機械じかけのフェナリナーサ)	July 22, 1982
20	"The Lord of the Jungle"; Transliteration: "Mitsurin no Ōja" (Japanese: 密林の王者)	July 29, 1982
21	"First Part: 00 Momo Lot of Crisis"; Transliteration: "Zenpen: Daburu 00 Momo Kiki Ippai" (Japanese: 前編 00モモ危機いっぱい)	August 5, 1982
22	"Second Part: 00 Momo Victorious Password"; Transliteration: "Kōhen Daburu 00 Momo Shōri no Angō" (Japanese: 後編 00モモ勝利の暗号)	August 12, 1982
23	"The King Settles Free"; Transliteration: "Korogarikonda Ōsama" (Japanese: ころがりこんだ王様)	August 19, 1982
24	"The Wandering Unicorn"; Transliteration: "Sasurai no Yunikōn" (Japanese: さすらいのユニコーン)	August 26, 1982
25	"Good Luck, Miracles"; Transliteration: "Ganbare Mirakuruzu" (Japanese: がんばれミラクルズ)	September 2, 1982
26	"Bride of the Apartion Wood"; Transliteration: "Yōmaga Mori no Hanayome" (Japanese: 妖魔が森の花嫁)	September 9, 1982
27	"Devil's Triangle"; Transliteration: "Ma no Toraianguru" (Japanese: 魔のトライアングル)	September 16, 1982
28	"The Speedy Egg Race"; Transliteration: "Gekisō Tamago Rēsu" (Japanese: 激走タマゴレース)	September 23, 1982
29	"The UFO Visits"; Transliteration: "UFO ga Yattekita" (Japanese: UFOがやって来た)	September 30, 1982
30	"The Spaceship Goes to the Hometown"; Transliteration: "Furusato Yuki no Uchūsen" (Japanese: ふるさと行きの宇宙船)	October 7, 1982
31	"Revived Legends"; Transliteration: "Yomigaetta Densetsu" (Japanese: よみがえった伝説)	October 14, 1982
32	"The Greater than Great Visitor"; Transliteration: "Ōkisugita Hōmonsha" (Japanese: 大きすぎた訪問者)	October 21, 1982
33	"Android's Love"; Transliteration: "Andoroido no Koi" (Japanese: アンドロイドの恋)	October 28, 1982
34	"Princess of the Land of Depth"; Transliteration: "Chitei no Kuni no Purinsesu" (Japanese: 地底の国のプリンセス)	November 4, 1982
35	"Dreaming Diamond"; Transliteration: "Yumemiru Daiyamondo" (Japanese: 夢見るダイヤモンド)	November 11, 1982
36	"Great Inheritance"; Transliteration: "Ōinaru Isan" (Japanese: 大いなる遺産)	November 18, 1982
37	"Flying Trapeze for Love"; Transliteration: "Ai no Kūchū Buranko" (Japanese: 愛の空中ブランコ)	November 25, 1982
38	"Snow Bring the Meets of Fate"; Transliteration: "Yuki no Meguriai" (Japanese: 雪のめぐり逢い)	December 2, 1982
39	"Assault Minky Mama"; Transliteration: "Totsugeki Minkī Mama" (Japanese: 突撃ミンキーママ)	December 9, 1982
40	"The Dream Warrior"; Transliteration: "Yume no Senshi" (Japanese: 夢の戦士)	December 16, 1982
41	"Please Santa Claus"; Transliteration: "Onegai Santakurōsu" (Japanese: お願いサンタクロース)	December 23, 1982
42	"The Great Tactics of Full of Mistakes"; Transliteration: "Machigai Darake no Dai Sakusen" (Japanese: 間違いだらけの大作戦)	December 30, 1982
43	"Someday, My Prince Will Come"; Transliteration: "Itsuka Ōji Sama ga" (Japanese: いつか王子さまが)	January 6, 1983
44	"Advent of an Angel"; Transliteration: "Tenshi ga Oritekita" (Japanese: 天使が降りてきた)	January 13, 1983
45	"The Day the Magic Disappeared"; Transliteration: "Mahō no Kieta Hi" (Japanese: 魔法の消えた日)	January 20, 1983
46	"Fenarinarsa in the Dream"; Transliteration: "Yume no Fenarināsa" (Japanese: 夢のフェナリナーサ)	January 27, 1983
47	"Minky Momo Graffiti (Part 1)" (Japanese: MINKY MOMO GRAFETY part-1)	February 3, 1983
48	"Minky Momo Graffiti (Part 2)" (Japanese: MINKY MOMO GRAFETY part-2)	February 10, 1983
49	"A Riddle of Peach and Momo"; Transliteration: "Momo to Momo no Nazo" (Japanese: 桃とモモの謎)	February 17, 1983
50	"Warned Against Her Apple"; Transliteration: "Ringo ni Goyōjin" (Japanese: リンゴに御用心)	February 24, 1983
51	"Last Action"; Transliteration: "Rasuto Akushon" (Japanese: ラストアクション)	March 3, 1983
52	"Mocher and the Penguin"; Transliteration: "Mochā to Pengin" (Japanese: モチャーとペンギン)	March 10, 1983
53	"The Train Runs to the Flowerbed"; Transliteration: "Ohanabatake o Hashiru Kisha" (Japanese: お花畑を走る汽車)	March 17, 1983
54	"Fly, Albatross"; Transliteration: "Tobe Arubatorosu Gō" (Japanese: 飛べアルバトロス号)	March 24, 1983
55	"Once Again with Love Apple"; Transliteration: "Rabu Appuru de Mōichido" (Japanese: 愛(ラブ)·アップルでもう一度)	March 31, 1983
56	"The Girl Basking under a Tree"; Transliteration: "Komorebi no Shōjo" (Japanese: 木もれ陽の少女)	April 7, 1983
57	"Man-Powered Airplane's Rhapsody"; Transliteration: "Jinriki Hikōki Rapusodī" (Japanese: 人力飛行機ラプソディー)	April 14, 1983
58	"Nocturne of the Fraud"; Transliteration: "Petenshi no Nokutān" (Japanese: ペテン師のノクターン)	April 21, 1983
59	"The Legend of the Certain Street Corner"; Transliteration: "Aru Machikado no Densetsu" (Japanese: ある街角の伝説)	April 28, 1983
60	"Time is a Cradle of Love"; Transliteration: "Toki wa Ai no Yurikago" (Japanese: 時は愛のゆりかご)	May 5, 1983
61	"Love Apple, Be Eternal!"; Transliteration: "Rabu Appuru yo Eien ni" (Japanese: 愛(ラブ)·アップルよ永遠に)	May 12, 1983
62	"Creepy Shadows"; Transliteration: "Shinobiyoru Kage" (Japanese: しのびよる影)	May 19, 1983
63	"Don't Say Goodbye: Last Episode"; Transliteration: "Sayonara wa Iwanaide: Saishūkai" (Japanese: さよならは言わないで 最終回)	May 26, 1983

=== 1991 TV series ===
A second television series, produced by Ashi Productions and sharing the same title as the original, premiered on NTV on October 2, 1991. After 38 episodes, the series changed its subtitle to Magical Princess Minky Momo: Hold on to Your Dreams (魔法のプリンセスミンキーモモ 夢を抱きしめて, Mahō no Purinsesu Minkī Momo: Yume o Dakishimete) and ended on December 23, 1992.

No.	Title	Original release date
1	"Hello, Minky Momo"; Transliteration: "Harō, Minkī Momo" (Japanese: ハロー、ミンキーモモ)	October 2, 1991
2	"Friends in the Park"; Transliteration: "Kōen no Tomodachi" (Japanese: 公園のともだち)	October 9, 1991
3	"Great Animal Mission"; Transliteration: "Animaru Daisakusen" (Japanese: アニマル大作戦)	October 16, 1991
4	"Dig here, Dinosaur!"; Transliteration: "Koko Hore, Kyōryū!" (Japanese: ここ掘れ、恐竜！)	October 23, 1991
5	"Strange, Strange Candy Land"; Transliteration: "Okashina Okashina Okashi no Kuni" (Japanese: おかしなおかしなお菓子の国)	October 30, 1991
6	"The Hero Disappeared?!"; Transliteration: "Yūsha ga Kieta!?" (Japanese: 勇者が消えた！？)	November 6, 1991
7	"Concert in the Snow"; Transliteration: "Yuki no Naka no Konsāto" (Japanese: 雪の中のコンサート)	November 20, 1991
8	"Playing Skillful Golf with a Mole"; Transliteration: "Mogura to Umaku Yaru Gorufu" (Japanese: モグラとうまくやるゴルフ)	November 27, 1991
9	"Rent the Great Prairie with a Video"; Transliteration: "Bideo de Rentaru, Dai Heigen" (Japanese: ビデオでレンタル、大平原)	December 4, 1991
10	"Let Me Sleep, Please!"; Transliteration: "Nemurasete Onegai!" (Japanese: 眠らせてお願い！)	December 11, 1991
11	"Santa Falls from the Sky"; Transliteration: "Santa ga Sora kara Futtekita" (Japanese: サンタが空からふってきた)	December 18, 1991
12	"Don't Freeze Me!"; Transliteration: "Kōrasenaide" (Japanese: 凍らせないで！)	January 8, 1992
13	"The Warriors of the Snow Castle"; Transliteration: "Yuki no Oshiro no Senshi-tachi" (Japanese: 雪のお城の戦士たち)	January 15, 1992
14	"Once Upon a Time of a Morning Call"; Transliteration: "Mukashi-mukashi no Mōningukōru" (Japanese: 昔々のモーニングコール)	January 22, 1992
15	"Ninja Arrived! Momo is Ninja"; Transliteration: "Ninja Shutsugen! Shinobi no Momo" (Japanese: ニンジャ出現！忍びのモモ)	January 29, 1992
16	"Cinderella Panic"; Transliteration: "Shinderera Panikku" (Japanese: シンデレラ パニック)	February 5, 1992
17	"Triangle Festival"; Transliteration: "Toraianguru Fesutibaru" (Japanese: トライアングルフェスティバル)	February 12, 1992
18	"Let's Go Shopping"; Transliteration: "Kaimono e Ikō" (Japanese: 買い物へ行こう)	February 19, 1992
19	"I Don't Care About the Witch's Magic"; Transliteration: "Majo no Mahō wa Sorobanzuku" (Japanese: 魔女の魔法はそろばんずく)	February 26, 1992
20	"The Nurse is Very Busy"; Transliteration: "Kangofu-san wa Ōisogashi" (Japanese: 看護婦さんは大忙し)	March 4, 1992
21	"Focus? See me Transform"; Transliteration: "Fōkasu? Mirareta Henshin" (Japanese: フォーカス？見られた変身)	March 11, 1992
22	"Go! Go! Cheer Girl"; Transliteration: "Go! Go! Chia Gāru" (Japanese: Go! Go! チアガール)	March 18, 1992
23	"Which-City's Shootout"; Transliteration: "Docchi Shitī no Kettō" (Japanese: ドッチシティーの決闘)	March 25, 1992
24	"Dream of a Bouquet"; Transliteration: "Yumemiru Hanataba" (Japanese: 夢みる花束)	April 1, 1992
25	"The Dangerous Wedding Anniversary"; Transliteration: "Abunai Kekkon Kinenbi" (Japanese: あぶない結婚記念日)	April 8, 1992
26	"Dancing Big Bunny"; Transliteration: "Odoru Ō'usagi" (Japanese: 踊る大ウサギ)	April 15, 1992
27	"Smile, Cherry Doll"; Transliteration: "Waratte Cherī Dōru" (Japanese: 笑ってチェリードール)	April 22, 1992
28	"Let's Go Surviving!"; Transliteration: "Sabaibaru de Ikō!" (Japanese: サバイバルでいこう！)	April 29, 1992
29	"Chase the Mysterious Thief Nightingale!"; Transliteration: "Kaitō Uguisupan o Oe!" (Japanese: 怪盗ウグイスパンを追え！)	May 6, 1992
30	"I Want to be a Witch"; Transliteration: "Majo ni Naritai" (Japanese: 魔女になりたい)	May 13, 1992
31	"Momo's Hotel Gets How Many Stars!?"; Transliteration: "Momo no Hoteru wa Hoshi Ikutsu!?" (Japanese: モモのホテルは星いくつ！？)	May 20, 1992
32	"Supermant Appears!"; Transliteration: "Sūpāmanto Tōjō!" (Japanese: スーパーマント登場！)	May 27, 1992
33	"Launch-off! Minky Robo"; Transliteration: "Hasshin! Minkī Robo" (Japanese: 発進！ミンキーロボ)	June 3, 1992
34	"Teasing Fairy Panic"; Transliteration: "Itazura Yōsei Panikku" (Japanese: いたずら妖精パニック)	June 10, 1992
35	"Always Somewhere"; Transliteration: "Itsumo Doko ka de" (Japanese: いつもどこかで)	June 17, 1992
36	"Legend Inn: The Last Day"; Transliteration: "Rejendo In Saigo no Hi" (Japanese: レジェンドイン最後の日)	June 24, 1992
37	"What will happen? What should I do? Minky Momo"; Transliteration: "Dōnaru Dōsuru Minkī Momo" (Japanese: どうなるどうするミンキーモモ)	July 1, 1992
38	"Welcome New House"; Transliteration: "Yōkoso Nyū Hausu" (Japanese: ようこそニューハウス)	July 8, 1992
39	"Momo and Momo"; Transliteration: "Momo to Momo" (Japanese: モモとモモ)	July 15, 1992
40	"Mon-Mon-Monster"; Transliteration: "Mon Mon Monsutā" (Japanese: もんもんモンスター)	July 22, 1992
41	"The Great Adventure in the Land of the Bad Kid"; Transliteration: "Waruiko no Kuni de Daibōken" (Japanese: 悪い子の国で大冒険)	July 29, 1992
42	"Mermaid Legend's Private Sea"; Transliteration: "Naisho no Umi no Ningyo Densetsu" (Japanese: ナイショの海の人魚伝説)	August 5, 1992
43	"Right Out of her Dream... SOS"; Transliteration: "Yume no Naka kara... SOS" (Japanese: 夢の中から。。。SOS)	August 12, 1992
44	"The Legend of Northern Country"; Transliteration: "Kita no Kuni no Densetsu" (Japanese: 北の国の伝説)	August 19, 1992
45	"Let's Become a Genius!"; Transliteration: "Tensai ni Narō!" (Japanese: 天才になろう！)	August 26, 1992
46	"God's Implying Mistakes"; Transliteration: "Machigai Darake no Kamisama" (Japanese: 間違いだらけの神様)	September 2, 1992
47	"Carrots to Us!"; Transliteration: "Ninjin o Warera ni!" (Japanese: ニンジンを我らに！)	September 9, 1992
48	"Want a Baby!?"; Transliteration: "Akachan ga Hoshii!?" (Japanese: 赤ちゃんがほしい！？)	September 16, 1992
49	"Young Witch: Star Wars!?"; Transliteration: "Majokko Sutā Uōzu!?" (Japanese: 魔女っ子スターウォーズ！？)	September 23, 1992
50	"Happiness Heave-Ho"; Transliteration: "Shiawase Wasshoi" (Japanese: しあわせワッショイ)	September 30, 1992
51	"The Flapping Butterfly!"; Transliteration: "Batabata Batafurai!" (Japanese: ばたばたバタフライ！)	October 7, 1992
52	"Mobilize! Rescue Squad"; Transliteration: "Shutsudō! Otasuketai" (Japanese: 出動！おたすけ隊)	October 14, 1992
53	"Run, Dream Train"; Transliteration: "Hashire Yume Ressha" (Japanese: 走れ夢列車)	October 21, 1992
54	"Pirate Topaz's Treasure"; Transliteration: "Kaizoku Topāzu no Takaramono" (Japanese: 海賊トパーズの宝物)	October 28, 1992
55	"Nightmare's Wish"; Transliteration: "Akumu no Onegai" (Japanese: 悪夢のお願い)	November 4, 1992
56	"All Star! Song Album"; Transliteration: "Ōru Sutā! Uta no Arubamu" (Japanese: オールスター！歌のアルバム)	November 11, 1992
57	"Don't Be So Cold"; Transliteration: "Tsumetaku Shinaide" (Japanese: 冷たくしないで)	November 18, 1992
58	"Mysterious, Mysterious Cinema"; Transliteration: "Fushigina Fushigina Eigakan" (Japanese: ふしぎなふしぎな映画館)	November 25, 1992
59	"Songs to a Dream"; Transliteration: "Yume ni Utaeba" (Japanese: 夢に唄えば)	December 2, 1992
60	"Beyond the Dream"; Transliteration: "Yume no Kanata ni" (Japanese: 夢の彼方に)	December 9, 1992
61	"Burning! Scrap!?"; Transliteration: "Moeyo! Sukurappu!?" (Japanese: 燃えよ！スクラップ！？)	December 16, 1992
62	"Someday, I'll Be With You"; Transliteration: "Itsuka, Anata to" (Japanese: いつか、あなたと)	December 23, 1992
Unaired 1 (53.5)	"SOS! Marinarsa"; Transliteration: "SOS! Marināsa" (Japanese: SOS！マリンナーサ)	Unaired
Unaired 2 (58.5)	"Momo Goes to School"; Transliteration: "Momo Gakkō e Iku" (Japanese: モモ学校へ行く)	Unaired
Unaired 3 (46.5)	"Wish upon the Stars"; Transliteration: "Hoshi ni Negai o" (Japanese: 星に願いを)	Unaired

=== Video game ===
A video game based on Magical Princess Minky Momo, titled Mahō no Princess Minky Momo: Remember Dream (魔法のプリンセス ミンキーモモ リメンバードリーム) was released for the Famicom by Yutaka (a subsidiary of Bandai) on July 29, 1992.

=== Upcoming OVA ===
On December 24, 2025, the official X (formerly Twitter) account for the franchise announced that it would receive a new original video animation produced by Ashi Productions for the studio's 50th anniversary. Titled Magical Princess Minky Momo: A Duo of Sincerity Toward a Dream of Longing (魔法のプリンセスミンキーモモ 憧れの夢へ まごころの二重奏, Mahō no Purinsesu Minkī Momo: Akogare no Yume e Magokoro no Duo), the OVA will be directed by Ayumu Watanabe and written by Deko Akao, with Hiroshi Watanabe and Mari Tominaga designing the characters and Tomoki Hasegawa composing the music. The OVA was originally scheduled for November 13, 2026, but was later delayed due to production issues.

== International releases ==
In 1984, Harmony Gold acquired the rights to the original Minky Momo anime television series and repackaged it into the 52-episode The Magical World of Gigi. The English dubbed version was broadcast in Australia on Network Ten, Malaysia on RTM1 and RTM2, Singapore, Kuwait, Zimbabwe, Trinidad and Tobago, Indonesia, Kenya, Brunei and Israel.

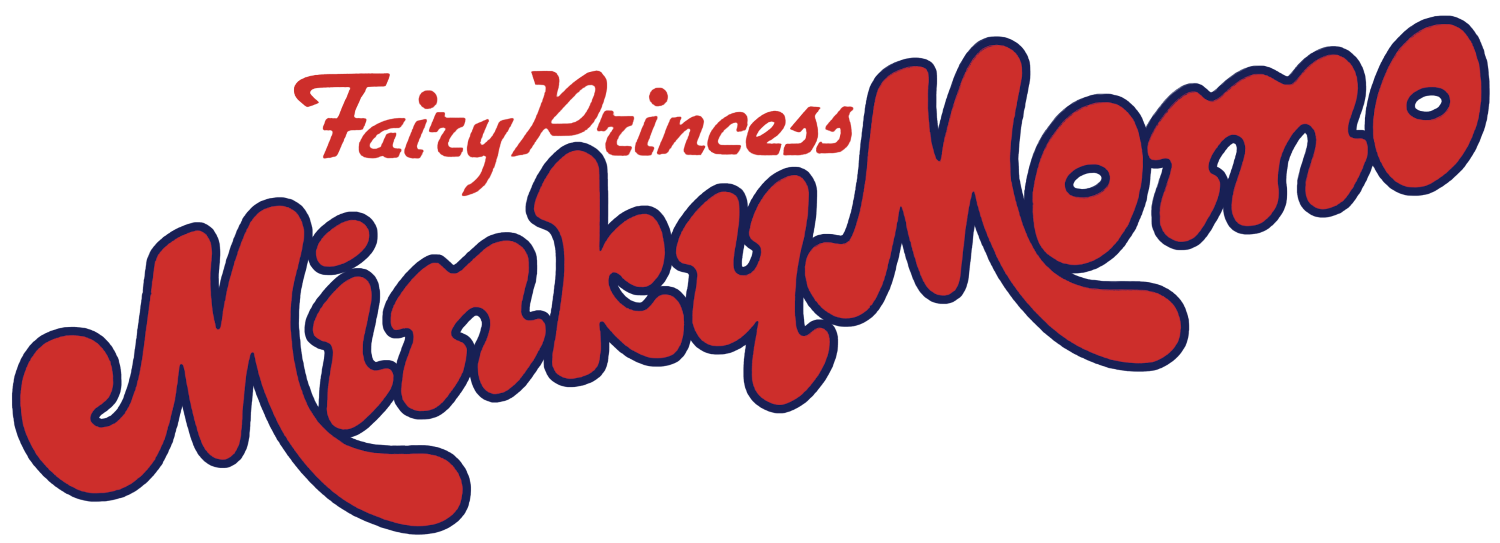
English Fairy Princess Minky Momo logo

Despite international distribution, North American audiences initially only received the 1985 OVA, Yume no naka no Rondo. The English dub release was produced by Harmony Gold and distributed on VHS by Celebrity Home Entertainment in 1987, titled Gigi and the Fountain of Youth. In 2015, William Winckler Productions released Harmony Gold's English dub of the original series in 13 compilation films through Amazon Prime Video. Crunchyroll streamed the original series under the title Fairy Princess Minky Momo.

The Hong Kong-based Animation International produced a Chinese dubbed version of the 1991 Ashi Productions series for Taiwanese audiences, with Jutong Cultural Enterprises JSC receiving broadcast rights. Jia Yu International syndicated and broadcast the series in Taiwan after 2009.

== Impact and influence ==
While aimed at young girls with the goal of selling toys, the original series attracted a considerable number of older male fans. Alongside Creamy Mami, the Magic Angel, Magical Princess Minky Momo is credited as one of the originators of the lolicon otaku subculture. Though this unintended audience allegedly disgusted Ashi Productions founder Sato Toshihiko, it helped the show gain a strong 10% viewer share, leading to its run being extended from 50 episodes to 63.

Episode 46 of the original series has become infamous due to its depiction of Momo dying after being hit by a truck carrying toys. In an issue of Japanese anime magazine OUT, series writer Takeshi Shudo explained that this was due to the toy sponsor Popy pulling their funding due to poor merchandise sales, despite strong ratings. Furious with this decision, Ashi Productions revolted and killed the character off at the end of the episode. While the character's death was only temporary, the sequence was seen as a trailblazer that allowed later magical-girl productions to deal with darker themes. The episode, alongside the last, later inspired a Japanese urban legend linking the series to natural disasters.

In 1993, Hiroshi Takada won JASRAC's International Award for his work on the first TV series.

The original series ranked 70th in TV Asahi's 2005 poll of the most popular anime.

== Soundtracks ==
=== Singles ===
Mahou no Princess Minky Momo: Yume no Naka no Rondo (1985)
sung by Mariko Shiga, EP, Victor Entertainment, KV-3068
Mahou no Princess Minky Momo: Yumemiru Heart (1991)
(CD) STAR CHILD, KIDA 31
Mahou no Princess Minky Momo: Yume wo Dakishimete (1992)
(CD) STAR CHILD, KIDA 42
Mahou no Princess Minky Momo: LOVE CALL (1993)
(CD) STAR CHILD, 8SSX 69

=== Albums ===
Magical Princess Minky Momo: Yume no Naka no Rondo Ongakuhen (1985)
(LP) Victor Entertainment, JBX-25066
(CD) Victor Entertainment, VDR-1073
Magical Princess Minky Momo: Fenarinarsa Song Festival (1985)
(CD) Victor Entertainment, VDR-1085
BGM MANIAC LIBRARY 3 Mahou no Princess Minky Momo Mihappyou BGM Shuu (1986)
(LP) Victor Entertainment, JBX-7003
(Cassette) Victor Entertainment, VSK-20003
Mahou no Princess Minky Momo: DaBaDaBa DaBaDa (1992)
(CD) King Records KICA-79
Mahou no Princess Minky Momo: Yuki ga Yandara (1992)
(CD) King Records, KICA-109
Mahou no Princess Minky Momo: Utau Fairy Tale! (1992)
(CD) King Records, KICA-120
Mahou no Princess Minky Momo: LOVE STAGE (1993)
(CD) King Records, KICA-131
Mahou no Princess Minky Momo: Yume ni Kakeru Hashi (1993)
(CD) King Records, KICA-146
Mahou no Princess Minky Momo: Someday My Prince Will Come (1994)
(CD) Victor Entertainment, VICL-23060 (also released on LP)
Mahou no Princess Minky Momo: Tabidachi no Eki (1994)
(CD) King Records, KICA-196
Mahou no Princess Minky Momo: Someday My Prince Will Come TV/OVA (1994)
(CD) Victor Entertainment, VICL-23060
Dendō Twin Series Magical Princess Minky Momo TV-ban OVA-ban (1999)
(CD) Victor Entertainment, VICL-60419/20

=== Compilations ===
These albums have songs from multiple shows. The applicable tracks are in bold.

Emotion 20th Anniversary Theme Collection - OVA & Movie
(CD) Victor Entertainment, VICL-60938

Disc 1

1. Dallos no Theme (Horn Spectrum, from Dallos)
2. **Yume no Naka no Rondo (Mariko Shiga, from La Ronde in My Dream**)
3. Active Heart (Noriko Sakai, from Gunbuster)
4. Try Again... (Noriko Sakai, from Gunbuster)
5. The Winner (Miki Matsubara, from Mobile Suit Gundam 0083: Stardust Memory)
6. Magic (Jacob Wheeler, from Mobile Suit Gundam 0083: Stardust Memory)
7. Just Fallin' Love: Ikustu mo no Setsunai Yoru no Naka de (Ayako Udagawa, from Dominion)
8. Kaze no Tsubasa (Hitomi Mieno, from Haou Taikei Ryuu Knight: Adeu's Legend)
9. Point 1 (Yumiko Takahashi, from Haou Taikei Ryuu Knight: Adeu's Legend)
10. Toketeiku Yume no Hate ni (Yayoi Gotō, from Iria: Zeiram the Animation)
11. 100mph no Yūki (Sakiko Tamagawa and Akiko Hiramatsu, from You're Under Arrest)
12. Arittake no Jōnetsu de (Sakiko Tamagawa and Akiko Hiramatsu, from You're Under Arrest)
13. After, in the Dark: Torch Song (Mai Yamane and Gabriela Robin, from Macross Plus)
14. Inori no Asa (Miwako Saitō, from Shamanic Princess)
15. Omoide no Mori (Miwako Saitō, from Shamanic Princess)
16. Future Shock (cherry, from Birdy the Mighty)

Disc 2

1. Ai, Oboete Imasu ka (long version) (Mari Iijima, from The Super Dimension Fortress Macross: Do You Remember Love?)
2. Tenshi no Enogu (Mari Iijima, from The Super Dimension Fortress Macross: Do You Remember Love?)
3. Akira no Theme (Geinoh Yamashirogumi, from Akira)
4. Voices (Akino Arai, from Macross Plus (movie edition))
5. Heart & Soul (Emilia with Basara Nekki, from Macross 7: The Galaxy Is Calling Me!)
6. In Yer Memory (Takkyū Ishino, from Memories)
7. Calling (Nitro, from You're Under Arrest: The Movie)
8. Tōi Kono Machi de (Naomi Kaitani, from Cardcaptor Sakura)
9. Ashita e no Melody (Chaka, from Cardcaptor Sakura)
10. Yubiwa (single version) (Maaya Sakamoto, from The Vision of Escaflowne)
11. Grace - Jinroh Main Theme - Omega (Hajime Mizoguchi, from Jin-Roh)
12. Ask DNA (The Seatbelts, from Cowboy Bebop: The Movie)
