= Pokémon Live! =

Musical

- Gotta catch'em Live!
- Cover of the cast recording CD release of the show
- Setting: Pokémon
- Premiere: September 15, 2000: The Pepsi Arena, Albany, New York, United States
- Productions: 2000 United States tour; 2001 United Arab Emirates; 2001 Mexico; 2002 Portugal; 2002 Belgium

Pokémon Live! is a musical stage production that toured the United States from September 15, 2000, to January 28, 2001. The musical was based on the Pokémon anime series, using similar characters, clothing, and story elements. The show uses songs previously released on the Pokémon anime soundtracks Pokémon 2BA Master and Totally Pokémon as well as original songs.

Approximately 90 minutes in length, the plot follows Ash Ketchum, Misty and Brock as they travel to a contest to win the much sought-after Diamond Badge. The event turns out to be part of a plan by the evil organization Team Rocket and its diabolical leader Giovanni to take over the world.

The show was successful, but received mixed reviews from critics. Despite the official Pokémon website mentioning plans for it, a home video release never came to fruition. A planned television release was also scrapped. A cast recording CD of the show, however, had a limited release.

Plans for 2002 performances in the United Kingdom were also made, but later cancelled. Pokémon Live! was invited to perform in Dubai, U.A.E. at Al Mamzar Park in March 2001, coinciding with the annual Dubai Shopping Festival. A Portuguese version of the show, produced by television company SIC, was performed from March 21 to March 27, 2002, at the Pavilhão Atlântico in Lisbon, Portugal. A Dutch adaptation of the musical was performed on April 6 and 7, 2002, at the Sportpaleis in Belgium.

Footage of the production did not surface until Chris Mitchell, the Production Stage Manager for the US tour, posted videos of the complete performance in Milwaukee's US Cellular Arena (dated December 30, 2000) in seven parts to his personal YouTube channel in 2012 and the whole performance in one video in 2016. In September 2020, a YouTube user named Benjamin Delbert posted an edit using restored elements from almost every performance of the show's run on YouTube.

== Plot synopsis ==
The following synopsis is based on videos of the show as provided by the production manager, Chris Mitchell, and the script he provided to pocketmonsters.net.

=== Act I ===
The story begins with a shadowed Giovanni releasing a commercial challenging all Pokémon Trainers to win the one-of-a-kind Diamond Badge by defeating him and his Pokémon in a battle. Ash declines to join his mother Delia, and Professor Oak to a lecture on sleep disorders among Snorlax, because he has decided to accept the mysterious Gym Leader's challenge. As he prepares for the journey, Misty chastises him for not taking her to the movies for her birthday as promised three weeks ago. Ash promises to make it up to her somehow, but adds that Pokémon are his friends too ("You and Me and Pokémon"). Together with Brock, Ash and Misty head off for the Gym using a map downloaded from the Diamond Badge website.

Meanwhile, Jessie, James, and Meowth get a call from Giovanni ordering them to go to his headquarters. When they arrive, he gloats about his ultimate creation, MechaMew2. The mechanical monster—based on the powerful Mewtwo he had late in the anime's first season and Pokémon: The First Movie—will soon be unstoppable ("It Will All Be Mine"). He orders Team Rocket to capture Ash's Pikachu, because it has Thundershock and Thunder Attack, two techniques that MechaMew2 doesn't have. They promise to do as he says after he promises them a good pay. Soon, several trainers face off against MechaMew2, which copies the attack of its challengers and uses it against them to defeat them. Among the moves it learns is Self Destruct, which it is not ordered to return as doing so would destroy it. Giovanni praises his mechanical Pokémon and gloats that as soon as it learns every Pokémon's attack, nothing will stand in his way ("It Will All Be Mine (Reprise)").

In the forest, Brock chases cute girls and Misty laments that Ash is ignoring her in favor of his Pokémon. Ash tells his friends that he wants them to travel together forever ("My Best Friends"). Jessie, James and Meowth dig a pitfall trap for Ash and his friends to fall into, but the heroes walk right over it without incident because the Rockets forgot to remove the supports. To their misfortune, Jessie and James only realize the cause when they pull out the supports and fall into their own trap, leaving a frustrated Meowth to run off for a rope to pull them out.

In the meantime, Delia and Professor Oak approach the old, run-down building where the Snorlax lecture is supposed to be held. After Delia confesses that she feels that she is losing touch with her son, the Professor reassures her by saying that things never stay the same for long ("Everything Changes"). Suddenly, several Rocket Grunts rush out of the shadows and surround them, and Giovanni says that the lecture was a trap to lure Professor Oak to them. When the Boss also recognizes Delia, she insists that anything between them was in the past, to which he says that some things don't have to change. Giovanni orders the Rocket Grunts to take Delia and Oak to an (offstage) helicopter and to his headquarters, where they'll witness something that will change the world forever ("Everything Changes (Reprise 1)").

Back in the forest, the heroes are lost and alone after Brock earlier threw the map in the river while asking a female trainer for directions. They try getting help from a deaf trainer with Brock interpreting his signs, who agrees to share his map on the condition that he and the "guy with the goofy smile" have a battle first. Offended, Ash agrees to this, but the deaf trainer sends out Jigglypuff, who instantly starts singing, which makes everyone fall asleep, after which Jigglypuff draws on their faces. Some time later, Misty wakes up and wipes Jigglypuff's drawings off Ash's face, singing about her unrequited love for him as she does so ("Misty's Song"). Ash and Brock wake up as well, with the former wondering aloud who was singing just now. Misty claims the song was Jigglypuff's, and the heroes notice that the deaf trainer kept his end of the deal and left his map for them. The group continues on to the next part of the path, this time with Misty carrying the map.

Meanwhile, Meowth gets Jessie and James, who have also danced to Jigglypuff's song, out of the pit while complaining about their incompetence. Realizing that Meowth is right, Jessie and James lament their status as failures. Meowth cheers them up by telling them that being failures is something at which they're successful ("The Best at Being the Worst"). With that, the Rockets set out to find Pikachu again. Using their Magikarp submarine, they manage to catch up with the trainers at Cerulean Blue Lagoon, where Ash declares that he's going to use Pikachu against the gym leader ("Pikachu (I Choose You)"). While the kids get caught up in the song, Team Rocket captures Pikachu when he dances near them. By the time Ash realizes Pikachu is missing, Team Rocket is long gone.

=== Act II ===
A special Pokémon trading card depicting MechaMew2 that was released during the show's run

After an intermission segment in which Ash's Pokédex Dexter explains his important contribution to Ash's continuing success and gathers data from the audience ("What Kind of Pokémon Are You?"), the heroes return to the forest. Ash is positive that his favorite Pokémon has once again been kidnapped by Team Rocket. Misty, still upset about being ignored on her birthday, suggests that maybe Pikachu has just left Ash of his own will because of the trainer's new habit of ignoring his friends. She runs after Brock, leaving Ash to ponder her words and worry that Pikachu did leave on his own. Ash bids an emotional farewell to Pikachu ("The Time Has Come").

At the Gym, Delia and Professor Oak are in the battle arena and locked inside giant cages. Oak asks Delia why the Boss recognized her. She explains that Giovanni is an old boyfriend from when she was a teenager and used to hang out with a bad crowd, which she put behind her when she met Ash's father. She never told this to Ash, fearing that he would not understand. Delia came to hate Giovanni, which he arrives just in time to hear. Realizing Delia has changed, Giovanni tells them that they're here to witness the final battle, as the only attacks left to be learned are Pikachu's electric moves ("You and Me and Pokémon (Reprise)"). Immediately after, the Rockets arrive with the captured Pikachu ("Double Trouble"). Giovanni orders them to battle MechaMew2 using Pikachu. They attempt to command Pikachu, but Pikachu shocks the Rockets instead, knocking them into the cages and allowing Oak and Delia to escape. Giovanni is unconcerned with his prisoners' escape. He realizes that Pikachu's trainer is necessary to make it battle, so he orders Jessie, James, and Meowth to bring Ash to him. They agree and set off to capture Ash ("Double Trouble (Reprise)").

Meanwhile, as she and Brock search fruitlessly for Pikachu, Misty admits that she just wanted Ash to realize that he's alienating his friends—specifically, her. Brock realizes Misty really likes Ash, and Misty denies it by saying Brock wouldn't know anything about liking someone—after all, he's always chasing Nurse Joy and Officer Jenny ("Two Perfect Girls").

Not far away, Delia and Professor Oak continue their discussion about her past and conflict over whether or not to tell it to Ash. Meanwhile, Misty continues to lament over her feelings for Ash. Elsewhere, Ash tells himself that he may have to go on without Pikachu, even if it hurts ("I've Got a Secret"). Soon, all five of them converge in the forest. Delia tells Ash that Giovanni has Pikachu in his hideout and that Team Rocket kidnapped him. Ash is furious, determined to get his Pokémon back and win the Diamond Badge. Before he can leave, Delia tells Ash of her past with Giovanni. Ash is shocked by the news and is in a hurry to leave. Suddenly, Jessie and James appear on scooters, ordering Ash to come with them. The team is utterly shocked when Ash agrees to join them without a fight. The others try to follow, but Meowth says that Ash was the only Pokémon trainer Giovanni wanted. As Ash and Team Rocket leave, Delia laments that she gave Ash even more of a reason to confront Giovanni. ("Everything Changes (Reprise 2)").

At his headquarters, Giovanni tells MechaMew2 that soon, their conquest of the world will begin. Ash runs in and demands that his Pikachu be returned. When Giovanni hears his surname and realizes he's Delia's son, Ash is angered and tells him to leave his mother out of this. Jessie and James enter announcing their capture of Ash, missing that he had already entered the arena, and celebrate having done two things correctly in one day. The Boss grows annoyed with them and orders them to leave, and they crash their scooters upon exiting. Joyfully reunited with Pikachu, Ash prepares to battle Giovanni and is shocked when he reveals himself to be the Gym Leader from the commercial. Giovanni mockingly gives Ash the Diamond Badge, saying he'll retrieve it after Ash loses.

Ash orders Pikachu to Thundershock, then Thunder MechaMew2, but the attacks do not affect it. MechaMew2 then returns the attacks, rendering Pikachu unable to battle. With that, Giovanni proclaims his victory because his Pokémon has now learned every single attack. Undaunted, Ash engages the Boss in a fistfight ("You Just Can't Win"). Tiring of the scuffle, Giovanni orders MechaMew2 to attack Ash with Hyper Beam, but Mewtwo appears to save Ash with a forcefield. He then attacks MechaMew2 with a collection of Ash's happy memories, like his love for Pokémon and Misty. MechaMew2 speaks for the first time and rebels against Giovanni, revealing that it learned about love and goodness from Ash. Recognizing that Giovanni is evil, MechaMew2 feels it must stop his plans no matter the cost. MechaMew2 puts Giovanni in a headlock and prepares to Selfdestruct, telling Mewtwo to take an unconscious Ash somewhere safe. Mewtwo exits with Ash and Pikachu, but not before explaining to Giovanni that Ash was the one who defeated MechaMew2. Giovanni breaks free of MechaMew2's grip and runs just before it blows up.

In the forest, Ash's friends ask him what happened, but Ash can't remember Mewtwo's sudden appearance or how the battle ended. He does, however, understand that his mom is still his mom, and he loves her regardless of her past. Reaching into his pocket, Ash pulls out the Diamond Badge, saying that he must have won it after all. He gives the badge to Misty as her birthday present while everybody else celebrates his triumph ("Finale"). Just before curtain call, the entire human and Pokémon cast appear and dance, including Giovanni.

== Musical numbers ==
Most of the musical numbers are remakes of songs previously released on the soundtracks Pokémon 2BA Master and Totally Pokémon. Four songs, "It Will All Be Mine", "The Best at Being the Worst", "I've Got a Secret", and "You Just Can't Win", are original songs. "Finale" is a fusion of "You & Me & Pokémon" and "My Best Friends".

Act I

1. You & Me & Pokémon — Ash, Misty, and Brock
2. It Will All Be Mine — Giovanni and Team Rocket.
3. It Will All Be Mine (Reprise) — Giovanni
4. My Best Friends — Ash, Misty, and Brock
5. Everything Changes — Professor Oak and Delia Ketchum
6. Everything Changes (Reprise 1) — Giovanni
7. Misty's Song — Misty
8. The Best at Being the Worst — Team Rocket
9. Pikachu (I Choose You) — Ash

Act II

11. What Kind of Pokémon Are You? — Dexter and the Dextettes
12. The Time Has Come — Ash
13. You and Me and Pokémon (Reprise) — Giovanni
14. Double Trouble — Team Rocket
15. Double Trouble (Reprise) — Team Rocket
16. Two Perfect Girls — Brock
17. I've Got a Secret — Delia Ketchum, Misty, and Ash
18. Everything Changes (Reprise 2) — Delia Ketchum
19. You Just Can't Win — Ash and Giovanni
20. Finale — Company

== Tour dates ==
Venue	Opening date	Closing date
The Pepsi Arena (Albany)	September 15, 2000	September 17, 2000
Radio City Music Hall (New York City)	September 20, 2000	October 1, 2000
Wolstein Center (Cleveland)	October 4, 2000	October 8, 2000
Oakdale Theatre (Wallingford)	October 10, 2000	October 15, 2000
Hummingbird Centre (Toronto)	October 17, 2000	October 22, 2000
Fox Theatre (Detroit)	October 25, 2000	October 29, 2000
Van Andel Arena (Grand Rapids)	October 31, 2000	November 1, 2000
Nationwide Arena (Columbus)	November 2, 2000	November 5, 2000
Pepsi Coliseum (Indianapolis)	November 8, 2000	November 12, 2000
EagleBank Arena (Fairfax)	November 14, 2000	November 19, 2000
Fox Theatre (Atlanta)	November 21, 2000	November 26, 2000
Bojangles' Coliseum (Charlotte)	November 29, 2000	December 3, 2000
Blockbuster-Sony Music Entertainment Centre (Camden)	December 6, 2000	December 10, 2000
Tsongas Arena (Lowell)	December 12, 2000	December 13, 2000
Centrum Centre (Worcester)	December 14, 2000	December 17, 2000
US Cellular Arena (Milwaukee)	December 27, 2000	December 31, 2000
The MARK of the Quad Cities (Moline)	January 2, 2001	January 3, 2001
Firstar Center (Cincinnati)	January 5, 2001	January 7, 2001
Roberts Municipal Stadium (Evansville)	January 9, 2001	January 10, 2001
Rosemont Theatre (Rosemont)	January 12, 2001	January 21, 2001
Xcel Energy Center (St. Paul)	January 23, 2001	January 28, 2001

== Original cast ==
- Ash Ketchum (Tenor) – Dominic Nolfi
- Misty (Belt) – Heidi Weyhmueller
- Brock (Baritone/Tenor) – Dennis Kenney
- Giovanni (Baritone) – Darren Dunstan
- Mrs. Ketchum (Mezzo Soprano) – Dee Roscioli
- Professor Oak (Tenor) – Patrick Frankfort
- Pikachu – Jennifer Risser (vocals recorded by Ikue Otani)
- Jessie (Mezzo Soprano) – Lauren Kling
- James (Baritone/Tenor) – Andrew Rannells
- Meowth – Kathleen Roche (vocals recorded by Maddie Blaustein)
- Psyduck – Leah Smith (vocals recorded by Michael Haigney)
- Mewtwo – Shaun Bradley (vocals recorded by Jay Goede)
- Jigglypuff – Leah Smith (vocals recorded by Rachael Lillis)
- Nurse Joy – Natalie Weld
- Officer Jenny – Suzanne Wogisch
- Dexter – Sinclair Mitchell

== Critical reception ==
The play received negative reception from critics. Little Review said "Maybe it's different in Japan, but it's hard to imagine a Japanese version of Pokémon Live!. This show may be based on televised anime, but its antecedents lie in American musicals from The King and I to Annie to The Lion King, with the Solid Gold Dancers and the Backstreet Boys mixed in. If you have a rudimentary knowledge of Pokémon and an enthusiastic underage companion, you'll find that you're having a good time even as your eyes roll towards the projection of Haunter on the ceiling."

Andrew Rannells, who subsequently became a well-known theater actor, had one of his first professional roles in the touring production of Pokémon Live! from September 2000 to August 2001, as the character James. When asked about his experience in 2014, he jokingly said that he would have rather starred in a porn film or snuff film instead and that he only took the job for the pay. In his 2019 memoir Too Much Is Not Enough: A Memoir of Fumbling Toward Adulthood, Rannells admitted that playing James in Pokémon Live! was a miserable experience, since he found the character to be an offensive depiction of a gay man. As a gay man himself, he felt the role was not only a hurtful insult towards his orientation, but also a bad role model for any gay kid who watched the show when it was on tour. He also admitted that he only starred in the show because he was broke and needed the paycheck.
