= Pokémon episodes removed from rotation =

Episodes of the Pokémon anime removed from syndication

The Pokémon franchise's logo

Pokémon is an anime television series that originally debuted in Japan on April 1, 1997. Throughout its run of over 1,300 episodes, specific episodes have been pulled from airing, banned from airing in certain countries, or never aired at all.

Many episodes that have been banned were stated to have been the cause of "moral panic" as a result of the content included in them. The globally banned episode "Dennō Senshi Porygon", which aired only once on Japan's TV Tokyo on December 16, 1997, features a series of rapidly alternating red and blue frames that provoked epileptic seizures in hundreds of children. Episodes including the Pokémon species Jynx and Passimian were pulled from air or never aired in the United States due to concerns about racial stereotyping and blackface in their respective episodes. Other episodes were removed from airing due to various real-world events.

== Banned episodes ==
=== "Dennō Senshi Porygon" Incident ===
"Dennō Senshi Porygon" (でんのうせんしポリゴン, Dennō Senshi Porigon; translated as "Cyber Soldier Porygon" or "Electric Soldier Porygon") aired only once on TV Tokyo in Japan on December 16, 1997, at 6:30 pm JST. The episode focused on protagonist Ash Ketchum, who had to fight a Porygon stolen by the villainous organization Team Rocket. To do this, Ash travels to cyberspace, where missiles are fired to attack him. To stop these missiles, Ash's Pikachu uses a destructive attack, causing an explosion that resulted in rapid flashes of red and blue lights. Although red and blue flashes are shown earlier in the episode, a technique called "paka paka" makes this scene especially intense, as it uses alternating rapidly flashing lights to convey a sense of tension. As a result, the scene contained rapid flashing listed at 10 hertz, which translated to roughly ten flashes a second.

A slowed-down version of the effect that caused epileptic seizures among the viewers of the episode.

At this point, some viewers complained of blurry vision, headaches, dizziness, and nausea. Seizures, temporary blindness, convulsions, and lost consciousness were also reported. Japan's Fire Defense Agency reported that a total of 685 viewers, 310 boys and 375 girls, were taken to hospitals by ambulances, though other accounts gave the total as more than 700. Others had seizures while watching news reports rebroadcasting clips of the scene. A fraction of the 685 children treated were diagnosed with photosensitive epilepsy. Later studies showed that 5–10% of viewers had mild symptoms that did not need hospital treatment. Approximately 12,000 children reported mild symptoms of illness following the incident, but they more closely resembled symptoms of mass hysteria. A study following 103 patients over three years found most viewers had no further seizures.

News of the incident spread quickly through Japan. On December 17, the day after the broadcast, TV Tokyo issued an apology to the Japanese people, suspended the program, and said it would investigate the cause of the seizures. Officers acting on orders from Japan's National Police Agency questioned the program's producers about its contents and production process. The Ministry of Health, Labour and Welfare held an emergency meeting to discuss the case with experts and gather information from hospitals. The series was removed from the airwaves.

After the airing of "Dennō Senshi Porygon", The show went on a four month hiatus until the airing of "Pikachu's Goodbye", after which regular airings of the anime resumed. After the episode aired, thorough studies occurred regarding the incident, and several rules were implemented for what animation techniques could be used in anime as a whole, particularly in terms of flashing lights and their usage. Though the rules were never legally mandated, they were widely adopted across the Japanese animation industry as a result of the episode.

=== Episodes featuring Jynx ===
Official artwork of Jynx's old design. Jynx's resemblance to negative racial stereotypes resulted in several episodes being removed from airing.

Jynx is a species of Pokémon that was considered by Western audiences to be a racial stereotype, resembling blackface performance, and received significant controversy. Jynx's usually black skin was later changed to purple, and several other features were altered in order to minimize comparisons to a racist stereotype. Despite changes, many episodes featuring Jynx were never re-aired for Western audiences. A holiday episode titled "Holiday Hi-Jynx" was removed from airing, and minor cameos in the episodes "Stage Fight!" and "The Mandarin Island Miss Match" resulted in the later two episodes being removed as well. Jynx's prominence in the episode "The Ice Cave!" also led to that episode's removal. Future episodes of the show would later remove Jynx from the episodes it had made cameos in, and it would subsequently make very few appearances in the anime, with very few episodes after "The Ice Cave!" making Jynx an important character.

=== Other episodes banned in the West ===
==== "Beauty and the Beach" ====
Scene from the episode "Beauty and the Beach" when James shows off his inflatable breasts, offending Misty.

"Beauty and the Beach" (アオプルコのきゅうじつ, Ao Puruko no Kyūjitsu) is the 18th episode of the first season of the anime. In the episode, Ash and his friends Misty and Brock accidentally destroy a boat. This requires them to work at the boat owner's restaurant to obtain the money to pay him back. The man appears attracted to Misty while she works at the restaurant. After the villainous Team Rocket diverts customers to another establishment, Professor Oak informs the protagonists of a beauty pageant taking place, which Misty competes in to win the prize money. Jessie and James of Team Rocket also compete, with James wearing an outfit with inflatable breasts to participate. James taunts Misty using the breasts, stating that she is "ten years too young." Team Rocket is eventually defeated, and the protagonists are able to repair the boat they destroyed.

Due to the series being predominantly aimed at a younger audience, the episode's sexualization of its characters became problematic, as it was offensive in American culture for a pre-pubescent character not only to compete in a bathing suit competition but also to be ridiculed for their age as a result. The episode also aired in the wake of the murder of JonBenét Ramsey, a child beauty queen, which caused a widespread scrutiny toward the sexualization of child beauty pageants in the U.S. James's crossdressing was additionally considered to be a possible point of contention, especially among parents of viewers. U.S. localizers deemed the episode to be too controversial and did not let it air with the rest of the series. Eventually keeling to pressure from a group of fans known as the "Lost Episodes Campaign," Nintendo of America agreed to let the episode air. The broadcast rights were secured by 4Kids Entertainment. 4Kids dubbed the episode in English and trimmed the sections featuring James's inflatable suit, re-adding the episode to its episode circulation and advertising the episode as being the series's "lost episode."

==== "The Legend of Miniryu" ====
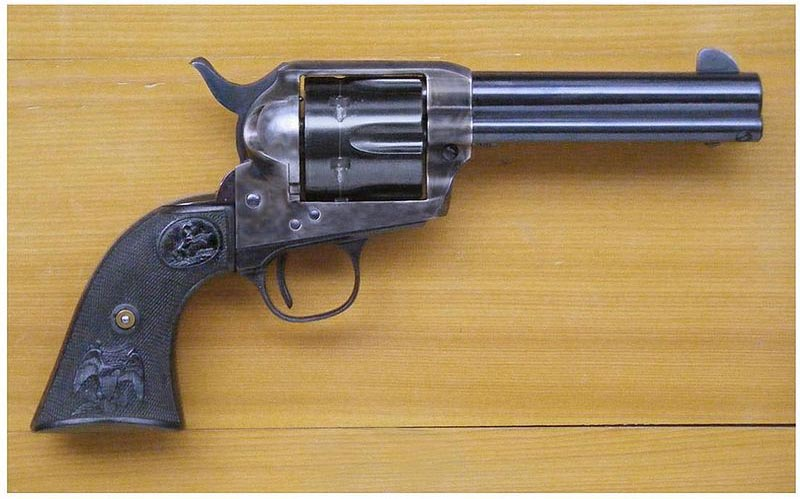
A Colt Single Action Army like what Kaiser has in "The Legend of Dratini". The heavy usage of guns resulted in the episode never being aired in the West.

"The Legend of Miniryu" (ミニリュウのでんせつ, Miniryū no Densetsu), also known as "The Legend of Dratini," was aired in Japan on November 25, 1997. The episode has Ash and his friends enter a location known as the Safari Zone to catch Pokémon. The area's warden, named Kaiser, points a gun at them, and other guns and bombs appear in various capacities throughout the episode. Due to the episode's frequent use of firearms and a desire to keep the series friendly for a family audience, the episode was never aired outside of Japan. Unlike other episodes unaired in the West, 4Kids Entertainment never dubbed the episode, resulting in the episode having no official English translation.

==== "Satoshi and Nagetukesaru! A Touchdown of Friendship!!" ====
"Satoshi and Nagetukesaru! A Touchdown of Friendship!!" is the 64th episode of the series Pokémon the Series: Sun & Moon. The episode depicted Ash attempting to cheer on a group of Pokémon called Passimian. To do this, he wore a costume resembling Passimian and used black makeup to mimic Passimian's face. Although it was never explained why the episode was skipped over, some speculated that the face paint Ash used to disguise himself as a Passimian could be mistaken for blackface. The episode never received an official English translation.

== Unaired, postponed, and temporarily removed episodes ==
=== "Tentacool and Tentacruel" and "The Tower of Terror" ===
The series's nineteenth episode, "Tentacool and Tentacruel", featured the Pokémon Tentacool and Tentacruel, with the latter, in a giant state, destroying several buildings. This caused the episode to be removed from airing after the September 11 attacks happened in the United States. Another episode titled "The Tower of Terror" was removed from airing after the terrorist attacks likely due to its title, despite the episode in question having no similarities to the attacks. Both episodes were later reinstated and aired on Cartoon Network, though "Tentacool and Tentacruel" was later removed from air again following Hurricane Katrina in 2005.

=== "Team Rocket vs. Team Plasma!" ===
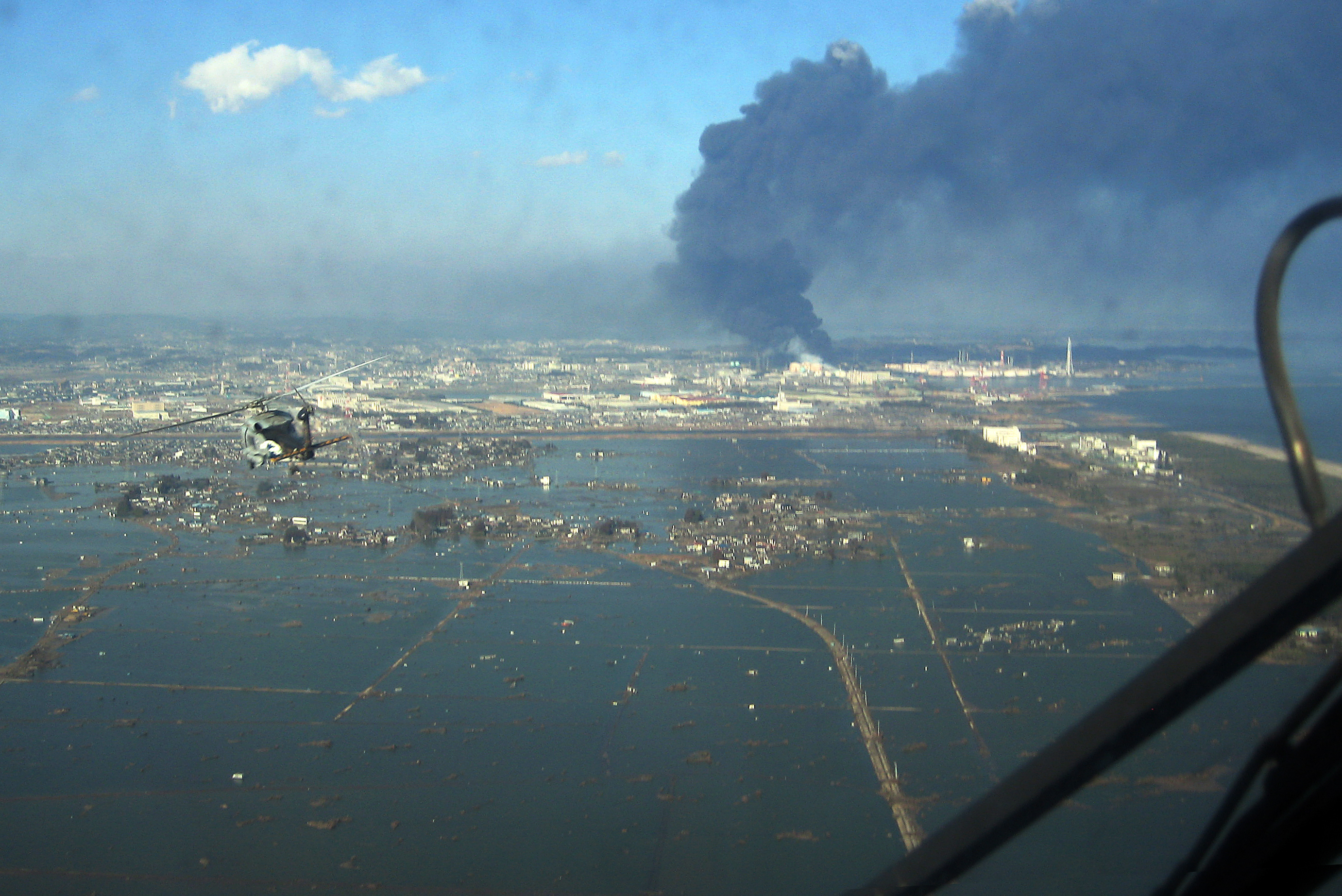
The destruction caused by the 2011 Tōhoku earthquake and tsunami was believed to be the reason why "Team Rocket vs Team Plasma" was never aired.

The anime series Pokémon the Series: Black & White planned to adapt the characters of Team Plasma from the games in the two-part episode "Team Rocket vs. Team Plasma!" The episodes would have featured Team Rocket dueling with Team Plasma and would have ended with a city being threatened by explosions hailing from the energy-conducting Meteonite item. The episodes were originally scheduled to be broadcast on March 17 and 24, 2011. The 2011 Tōhoku earthquake and tsunami occurred directly before the episodes' broadcast. As a result, the episodes were never aired, instead being skipped in favor of the episode directly following the two-parter. As a result of the episodes not being aired, the anime's plot was significantly changed. Team Plasma was later introduced in the 2013 episode "Team Plasma's Power Plot", and their plotline was fit into ten episodes, resulting in a significantly reduced role in comparison to the games. Though there were initially plans for the episodes to be broadcast at a later date, the episodes were never actually aired.

Twelve years later, the unaired episodes' scripts were discovered. An unknown buyer had obtained the scripts sometime in 2013 and offered to sell them. Though the Pokémon community raised the amount the buyer offered, the buyer later released the scripts for free online. The release of the scripts confirmed content about the episode, revealing that Team Plasma would have lost control of the Meteonite's power, leading to vast destruction across a city. Due to this, it was speculated that the episodes were never aired due to similarities to the destruction caused by the Tōhoku earthquake and tsunami.

=== Other episodes ===
==== "Battle of the Quaking Island! Dojoach vs. Namazun!!" ====
The episode "Battle of the Quaking Island! Dojoach vs. Namazun!!", which would have been released as part of Pokémon: Advanced Battle, was never aired due to the 2004 Chūetsu earthquake. The episode featured the Pokémon Whiscash, which is capable of causing earthquakes, and is widely believed to be the reason for the episode's removal. This had also lead to the banning of three moves in the anime, Earthquake, Magnitude, and Fissure.

==== "An Undersea Place to Call Home!" ====
The episode "An Undersea Place to Call Home!", featuring Ash and his friends Clemont, Serena, and Bonnie helping a Pokémon named Skrelp return to its family in a sunken cruise ship, was originally set to broadcast on April 24, 2014. The sinking of MV Sewol led to the episode being pulled from its timeslot with plans for a later broadcast. The episode was officially aired on November 20, 2014.

==== Pokémon Journeys: The Series episodes ====
Several episodes from Pokémon Journeys: The Series were postponed from their original air dates due to the COVID-19 pandemic and were replaced with reruns. New episodes resumed airing on June 7, 2020, following the state of emergency being lifted in Japan.
