= Barbara Brousal =

American singer-songwriter

- Born: October 6, 1966 (age 58)
- Origin: Boston, Massachusetts, U.S.
- Genres: Children's
- Occupation: Singer-songwriter
- Instrument(s): Guitar, mandolin, vocals
- Website: www.barbarabrousal.com

Barbara Brousal (born October 6, 1966) is a Boston, Massachusetts–based singer-songwriter, teacher, and politician. She sings, plays guitar and mandolin and has composed songs on four children's albums with Dan Zanes and Friends including the Grammy-winner Catch That Train. Additionally, she toured with Dan Zanes and Friends from 2000 to the fall of 2006.

Brousal has also released three solo albums of original material, Breathing Down Your Neck (1996), Pose While It Pops (2000), and Just About Perfect (2002). Her songs have appeared on the soap opera One Life to Live and in the independent film Hold This.

Brousal wrote the music for the play Brooklyn Bridge, by playwright Melissa James Gibson, and performed in its premier at the Children's Theatre Company in Minneapolis, MN.

In 2014, Brousal, under her married name of Barbara Brousal-Glaser, was elected as an Alderman in the city of Newton, Massachusetts in a special election in September 2014.

Brousal is also sister to singer-songwriter and voice actor Eric Stuart, and step-daughter to writer William Hogeland.
