= Dennis Kenney =

American stylist, singer, and former competitive hockey player

- Born: September 18; Boston, Massachusetts, U.S.
- Citizenship: American
- Education: Carnegie Mellon University (BFA)
- Occupations: Singer; actor; wardrobe stylist; creative director; fashion designer; educator
- Years active: 2001–present
- Height: 1.83 m (6 ft 0 in)
- Political party: Democratic Party
- Movement: Liberalism
- Partner: Steve McGee

Dennis Kenney is an American creative director, wardrobe stylist, ready-to-wear fashion designer, singer, actor, executive presence expert, public speaking Instructor at Harvard Business School, and former competitive hockey player. He is best known for his work as the Grinch in the New York press tour of Dr. Seuss' How the Grinch Stole Christmas! The Musical

== Education ==
Born in Boston, Dennis Kenney graduated from the Carnegie Mellon College of Fine Arts with a Bachelor of Fine Arts in drama.

== Stage Performances ==
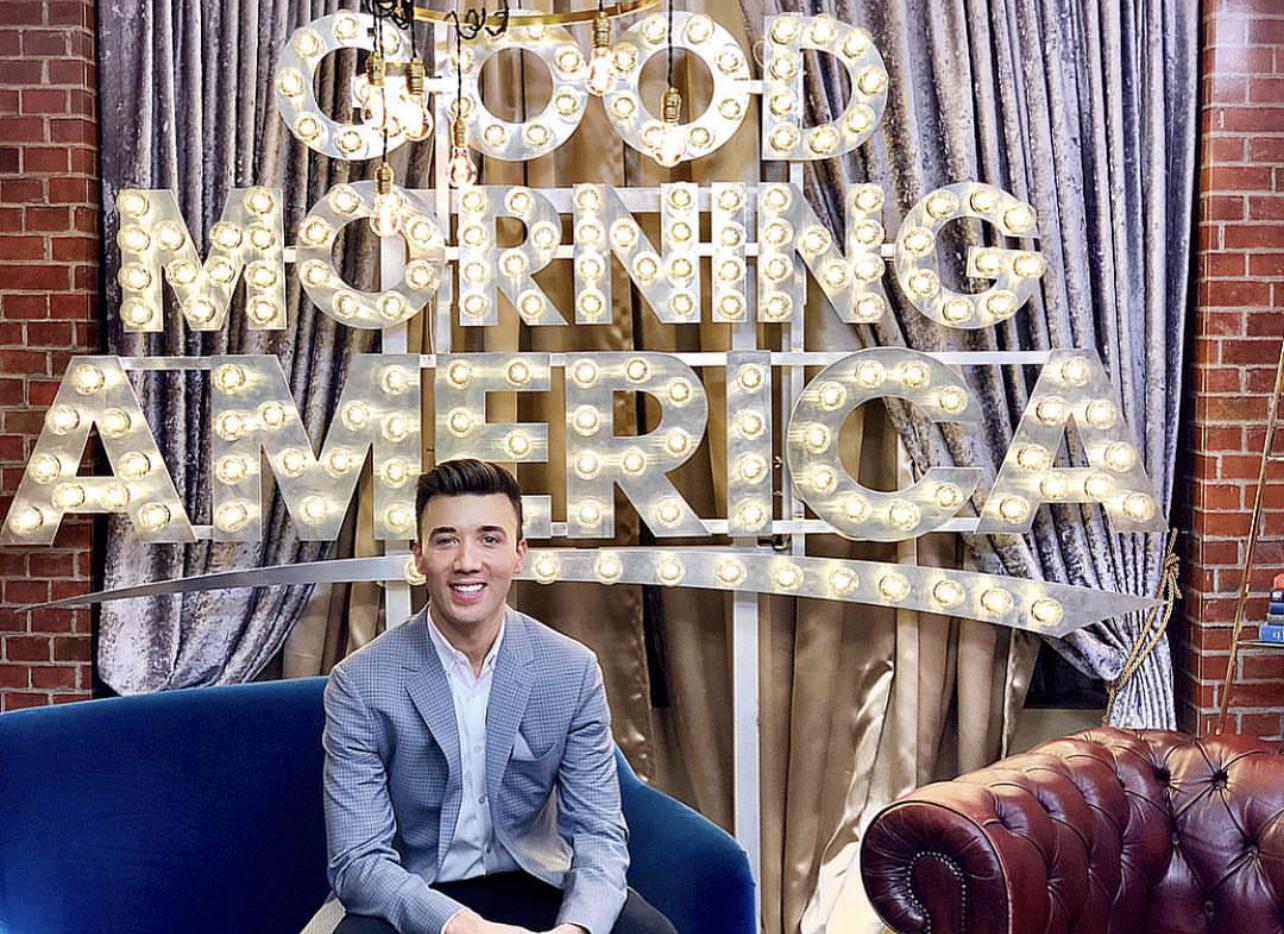

Kenney has performed as a professional dancer and singer on stage. He performed the role of Eddie in the Las Vegas Company of Mamma Mia! as well as The 42nd Street Revival Tour and the 40th anniversary revival of Mame at the Kennedy Center in 2006 with Christine Baranski, Harriet Harris, and Emily Skinner. He also was in the original US tour cast of Pokémon Live!

== Television ==
Kenney was part of CBS Networks Ethnic Diversity Comedy Showcase and later had a minor role on The Young and the Restless. His first primetime appearance was on Comedy Central when he performed an impression of Alex Rodriguez in the first episode of the Onion Sportsdome in a segment titled "The Overcomings of Andre (The A-Rod Musical)". He has also performed on The Today Show with Kathie Lee and Hoda Kotb, CNN's Starting Point with Soledad O'Brien, Fox and Friends, The Couch on CBS, and The Better Show. As a voice actor, Kenney appeared in several 4Kids programs, including as the voice of Brock on Pokémon Live! soundtrack and stage performances. He also filmed an official Pokémon promotional tape co-hosting with Andrew Rannells distributed at Target stores in the US in 2001. In 2019 Kenney was the wardrobe supervisor for Season 10 of Trading Spaces on TLC.

== Stylist career ==
In 2014, Kenney founded Style with Den and became its creative director, where he works as a celebrity stylist and lifestyle consultant.

Since 2019 he has contributed style seasonal fashion advice to Good Morning America a fashion contributor to ABC's World News Now, and a Stylist to QVC. He launched his fashion line NONDK Apparel in 2019.

== Teaching career ==
Kenney joined LIM College as an adjunct professor in early 2020 and taught business and entrepreneurship courses to graduate and undergraduate students. He currently coaches the Speech Team at the Pike School in Andover, Massachusetts.

== Real estate ventures ==
Kenney was featured in The New York Times for his real estate portfolio in 2019.
