= Mewtwo =

Pokémon species

- Pokémon character
- Mewtwo artwork by Ken Sugimori
- First game: Pokémon Red and Blue (1996)
- Designed by: Ken Sugimori
- Voiced by: English: Jay Goede (Mewtwo Strikes Back, Pokémon Live!, Pokémon Puzzle League); Dan Green (Pokémon: Mewtwo Returns, Mewtwo Strikes Back: Evolution and Pokémon Journeys: The Series); Miriam Pultro (Genesect and the Legend Awakened); Christopher Corey Smith (Detective Pikachu games); Rina Hoshino & Kotaro Watanabe (Detective Pikachu film); Japanese: Masachika Ichimura (adult, and Super Smash Bros. Melee); Shōtarō Morikubo (young, Mewtwo Strikes Back); Katsuyuki Konishi (The Mastermind of Mirage Pokemon); Reiko Takashima (ExtremeSpeed Genesect: Mewtwo Awakens); Fujiko Takimoto (young, The Birth of Mewtwo, CD drama); Keiji Fujiwara (Super Smash Bros. for Nintendo 3DS and Wii U, Super Smash Bros. Ultimate); Kōichi Yamadera and Sayaka Kinoshita (Pokémon Detective Pikachu film)

In-universe information
- Species: Pokémon
- Type: Psychic (Mewtwo, Mega Mewtwo Y); Psychic and Fighting (Mega Mewtwo X)

Mewtwo (/ˈmjuːtuː/; Japanese: ミュウツー, Hepburn: Myūtsū) is a Pokémon species in Nintendo and Game Freak's Pokémon media franchise. It was first introduced in the video games Pokémon Red and Blue, and later appeared in subsequent sequels and spin-off titles. In the video games, the player can fight and capture Mewtwo in order to subsequently pit it against other Pokémon. Often referred to as "the world's strongest Pokémon" in various media, it was the strongest in the original games in terms of base statistic distribution. Being genetically engineered by humans, it is known as the "Genetic Pokémon".

It has appeared in various media, being a central character in the films Pokémon: The First Movie, Pokémon: Mewtwo Returns, Pokémon the Movie: Genesect and the Legend Awakened, Detective Pikachu, as well as the musical Pokémon Live!. Additionally, Mewtwo has featured in other game franchises, such as Super Smash Bros. series.

== Conception and design ==
Mewtwo is a species of fictional creatures called Pokémon created for the Pokémon media franchise. Developed by Game Freak and published by Nintendo, the Japanese franchise began in 1996 with the video games Pokémon Red and Green for the Game Boy, which were later released in North America as Pokémon Red and Blue in 1998. In these games and their sequels, the player assumes the role of a Trainer whose goal is to capture and use the creatures' special abilities to combat other Pokémon. Each Pokémon has one or two elemental types, which define its advantages and disadvantages when battling other Pokémon. A major goal in each game is to complete the Pokédex, a comprehensive Pokémon encyclopedia, by capturing, evolving, and trading with other Trainers to obtain individuals from all Pokémon species.

Introduced in Red and Blue, Mewtwo was conceived and designed by design lead Ken Sugimori, and was one of the earliest designs created, preceding that of series mascot Pikachu. Standing 6 feet 7 inches (201 cm) tall, it appears as a bipedal feline. Mewtwo has a light gray physique with a pronounced tail and abdomen, large thighs, purple irises, bulbous fingertips, pronounced collarbone, crest-like pinnae, and a tube-like mass of flesh that connects from behind its head to the center of its upper back. Sugimori intended for the details in its shape as well as the look in its eyes to give off "an unsettling aura". According to Pokémon Company president Tsunekazu Ishihara, Mewtwo was expected to be popular with North American audiences, citing their preference for strong, powerful characters.

Created as a genetically modified clone of another Pokémon, the ancient Mew, Mewtwo directly precedes Mew in the game's numerical Pokémon index due to programmer Shigeki Morimoto's last-minute creation and inclusion of Mew into the game prior to release. Until the first Pokémon movie was released in the United States, Mewtwo was rarely referred to as a "clone" in Japanese sources. Kubo Masakazu, executive producer of Mewtwo Strikes Back, explained that they "intentionally avoid using the term 'kuron' [clone]… because the word has a frightening feel".

In the original games, Mewtwo is intended to be "the strongest Pokémon ever." Due to genetic engineering being applied to a sample of Mew's DNA in order to fully create Mewtwo's genome, Mewtwo is an extremely powerful psychic, with its abilities surpassing Mew's due to intentional alterations to the genetic source material. As such, it can use telekinesis for flight, to shield itself and to powerfully throw opponents aside. In addition, it is among the very few Pokémon capable of human speech, doing so via telepathy. Otherwise, it conserves its energy until needed, such as against powerful opponents. In addition to its psychic abilities, Mewtwo can also regenerate, which allows it to quickly recover from near-fatal injuries. For the sixth and seventh generations of the Pokemon video game series, Mewtwo has two Mega Evolved forms, Mega Mewtwo X and Mega Mewtwo Y. These can be activated if the player gives Mewtwo either the Mewtwonite X or the Mewtwonite Y.

== Appearances ==
=== In video games ===
Mewtwo has two Mega Evolutions, Mega Mewtwo X (left) and Mega Mewtwo Y (right).

In Pokémon Red and Blue, the player learns of Mewtwo's existence by reading research notes left in the ruined Pokémon Mansion on Cinnabar Island. The notes say that a scientist discovered a new Pokémon in a Guyana jungle, that they named it Mew, and that it later gave birth to a creature they called Mewtwo; the game's Pokédex entry states that Mewtwo was "created by a scientist after years of horrific gene splicing and DNA engineering experiments". Mewtwo proved too mighty to control, destroying the laboratory and escaping. The player is later given an opportunity to capture Mewtwo in the Cerulean Cave, which is accessible only after defeating the game's final bosses, the Elite Four and Blue; in the remakes Pokémon FireRed and LeafGreen this prerequisite was expanded, requiring the player to explore more thoroughly and record information on sixty Pokémon species before access to the cave would be granted. Mewtwo can be caught in Pokémon HeartGold and SoulSilver in the same location as before after defeating all of the gym leaders in Kanto. The character was also the focus of a promotion and downloadable content giveaway for Pokémon Black and White, debuting with its signature move "Psystrike" that can also be learned by leveling up. Mewtwo also reappears in Pokémon X and Y after completing the main story, and is one of the handful of Pokémon capable of using the new Mega Evolution mechanic, as it can transform into either Mega Mewtwo X or Mega Mewtwo Y. Mewtwo reappears in Pokémon: Let's Go, Pikachu! and Let's Go, Eevee!, another remake of Red and Blue, again in Cerulean Cave and is capable of Mega Evolution. Mewtwo is also obtainable alongside other past Legendary Pokémon in Pokémon Ultra Sun and Ultra Moon, Pokémon Sword and Shield: The Crown Tundra, and Pokémon Brilliant Diamond and Shining Pearl.

In addition to being transferable to almost every mainline Pokémon game, Mewtwo has also made appearances in multiple spin-offs. In Pokémon Stadium and Pokémon Pinball, Mewtwo appears as a final boss after all competitions have been completed. In Pokémon Puzzle League, Mewtwo, voiced by Philip Bartlett, serves not only as the final opponent, but also as the main antagonist responsible for the game's events. Mewtwo appears in the Pokémon Mystery Dungeon series, featuring Mewtwo as an unlockable player character that must be defeated before it may be used in Pokémon Mystery Dungeon: Blue Rescue Team and Red Rescue Team. Mewtwo has been a playable character in multiple entries of the Super Smash Bros. series. Mewtwo was originally meant to appear in the original Super Smash Bros., but was cut due to time constraints. Mewtwo made its debut in the series in Super Smash Bros. Melee voiced by Masachika Ichimura who reprises his role in Pokémon: The First Movie. After simply appearing as a trophy Super Smash Bros. Brawl, Mewtwo returned to the series as a DLC character in Super Smash Bros. for Nintendo 3DS and Wii U on April 28, 2015, though it was made available to Club Nintendo members who registered both versions on April 15, 2015. In 3DS and Wii U, its Final Smash involves it Mega Evolving into Mega Mewtwo Y and using Psystrike, its signature move in the Pokémon games. Mewtwo also returned as a playable character in Super Smash Bros. Ultimate for the Nintendo Switch, where it is once again an unlockable character. In both 3DS/Wii U and Ultimate, Keiji Fujiwara voices Mewtwo in all languages. A new form of Mewtwo, Shadow Mewtwo, appears as a boss character in Pokkén Tournament and has a special attack that involves it Mega Evolving into Mega Mewtwo X. Shadow Mewtwo can also be unlocked as a playable character. In addition, its normal form appears as a playable character. In augmented reality mobile game Pokémon Go, Mewtwo is able to be battled and caught in event Raids available on select dates and times, including a different variation of Mewtwo wearing its armor from Pokémon: Mewtwo Strikes Back - Evolution that was made available for a limited time in Tier 5 Raids in July 2019. In the Detective Pikachu game and its sequel Detective Pikachu Returns, Mewtwo is a major character of the plot with it being a key to the mystery behind the disappearance of the main character's father, Harry Goodman. Mewtwo also appears as a usable Pokémon in Pokémon Masters as the partner of Giovanni, who first became playable in the first Legendary Event, "Lurking Shadow". During the first part of the Villain Arc story with Team Rocket, "Looming Shadow of Kanto", the player could obtain Giovanni Legendary Spirit to raise the rarity of Giovanni to 6-Star EX if the player also used all 20 Power-Ups for Giovanni, which gives it a power boost and makes his Sync Move target all opponents instead of one, and then in the second part of the arc, "Spreading Shadow", the player could obtain Mewtwo Crystals to allow Giovanni's Mewtwo to evolve into Mega Mewtwo Y, which makes it even stronger and replaces the move Confusion with Psystrike until the end of the battle. In July 2023, Mewtwo was added as a playable character to Pokémon Unite.

=== In anime and related media ===
Mewtwo appears in the episode 63 of the animated series (episode 61 in the English dub) titled "The Battle of the Badge" wherein Giovanni sends in Mewtwo during his gym battle at Viridian Gym with Gary Oak. Mewtwo easily defeats all of Gary's Pokémon and is afterwards taken by Giovanni on a secret mission. In the following episode, "It's Mr. Mime Time!", Mewtwo appears briefly while Giovanni is on a video call with Team Rocket. In both episodes, Mewtwo is covered in various pieces of advanced armor and machinery which obscure its features.

Mewtwo is featured as the titular main antagonist in the 1998 film Pokémon: The First Movie. Unlike in the games, it is shown to be the creation of the criminal organization Team Rocket, and is referred to as an enhanced clone instead of a genetically modified mammal. After Mewtwo destroys the laboratory where it was born, Team Rocket's leader, Giovanni, convinces Mewtwo he can help it control its powers, instead using Mewtwo as a weapon. After escaping Giovanni, Mewtwo questions the reason for its existence and declares revenge on its creators. To this end, it lures several Pokémon trainers, among them is the anime series's main protagonist Ash Ketchum, to its island in order to clone their Pokémon. Once it does so, Mewtwo forces the originals to battle their clones in an effort to determine which set is superior, while Mewtwo faces its own genetic relative, Mew. Ash sacrifices himself to stop the brutal fighting, though he is later revived from tears shed by both the originals and clones because of his death.

Mewtwo, upon realizing and acknowledging the selflessness of Ash's sacrifice, comes to the conclusion that one's actions determine who they are, not the circumstances of their birth. Soon after having this epiphany, Mewtwo and the clones are joined by Mew as they leave to find a sanctuary, with Mewtwo erasing all memory of the events from those gathered as a final gift. In localizing the film for English-language audiences, Mewtwo's personality became more arrogant and megalomaniacal; localization director Norman Grossfield ruled the changes necessary, as he believed American audiences needed a "clearly evil" instead of ambiguous villain. In the film, Mewtwo is voiced by Jay Goede (credited as Philip Bartlett) in English, and by Ichimura in Japanese. In this film, Mewtwo displayed unique abilities and powers, such as blocking all Pokémon moves in his arena when the clones face off against the originals.

In September 1999, Nintendo published Sound Picture Box Mewtwo, which included The Birth of Mewtwo: Pokémon Radio Drama, a CD drama that expands upon Mewtwo's origins. Created by scientist Dr. Fuji, Mewtwo is one of several cloning attempts, which also includes Amber, a clone of Fuji's deceased daughter. The young Mewtwo befriends Amber, communicating telepathically; however, the cloning process proves unstable, and she dies. To save the traumatized Mewtwo, Fuji erases its memories and puts it under sedation until its body finishes developing, leading to the events of the film. The CD drama was later adapted into a short anime, and was included with Japanese home releases and broadcasts of Mewtwo Strikes Back and later in North America in December 2001 as part of Mewtwo Returns. Mewtwo as a child is voiced in Japanese by Fujiko Takimoto for the CD drama and Showtaro Morikubo for the anime, while in the English localization the voice actor is uncredited.

In December 2000, the film was followed by a direct sequel, Pokémon: Mewtwo Returns, which was broadcast on Japanese television in December 2000 and released worldwide on home video and DVD in 2001. Voiced by Dan Green in English with Ichimura reprising the role in Japanese, Mewtwo and the clones have since found peace on Mount Quena in Johto, a region which directly neighbors Mewtwo's home region of Kanto. However, Giovanni, whose memories were left intact after the first film, locates and pursues Mewtwo. Assisted by Ash and his companions, Mewtwo comes to terms with its existence and defeats Giovanni, removing any memory of itself from him and his soldiers' minds while leaving the others unaffected. As everyone departs, Mewtwo sets out on its own while the clones remain safely behind on Mount Quena.

Mewtwo also appears in the musical Pokémon Live!, a live action adaptation of the anime set after Pokémon: The First Movie – Mewtwo Strikes Back, and is portrayed by Marton Fulop. In it, Mewtwo faces a robotic replica of itself, MechaMew2, created by Giovanni and able to learn any attacks used against it. However, after learning compassion from Mewtwo, the machine rebels and self-destructs. The 2006 television special Pokémon: The Mastermind of Mirage Pokémon features a hologram version of Mewtwo, created and controlled by the story's antagonist Dr. Yung. With help from a hologram Mew, Ash and his companions destroy the Mewtwo hologram and defeat Yung.

Another Mewtwo appears in the anime special Mewtwo: Prologue to Awakening and its direct sequel Pokémon the Movie: Genesect and the Legend Awakened, voiced by the actress Reiko Takashima. Compared to the original Mewtwo, this one is also conflicted about its existence, yet is more empathic to the point of not being belligerent toward humans, as shown when it protects Ash, Iris, Cilan, and Eric from the rampaging Genesect army. Unlike the original Mewtwo, this one is able to Mega Evolve into Mega Mewtwo Y; due to Mega Evolution not being fully introduced at the time, it is referred to in the film as Mewtwo's "Awakened Form" (覚醒した姿, Kakusei-shita Sugata).

A Mewtwo, which was created by Mr. Fuji, appears in the anime miniseries Pokémon Origins, which is generally based on the plot of the video games Pokémon FireRed and LeafGreen. As such, Red goes to Cerulean Cave, and uses the Mega Evolution mechanic introduced in Pokémon X and Y to Mega Evolve his Charizard for the fight with Mewtwo, whom Red captures.

Mewtwo made its live-action animated debut in the 2019 movie Detective Pikachu. Mewtwo also appears in the film Pokémon: Mewtwo Strikes Back—Evolution, a remake of Pokémon: The First Movie – Mewtwo Strikes Back, that premiered on July 12, 2019.

Mewtwo from the first film appears in Pokémon Journeys episode "Getting More Than You Battled For!". Mewtwo protects several Pokémon that had been abused by humans on Cero Island since its departure from Mount Quena. Ash recognizes Mewtwo while Goh meets it for the first time after they were saved from the waterfall. After defeating Ash and Goh in a battle, Mewtwo decides to leave Cero Island with the rescued Pokémon and teleports them back to the Cerise Laboratory, allowing them to retain their memories of the encounter.

=== In printed adaptations ===
Mewtwo has appeared as a central character in several books related to the Pokémon franchise, including novelizations of Mewtwo Strikes Back and Mewtwo Returns, both of which closely follow the events of the films. In December 1999, Viz Media published the children's picture book I'm Not Pikachu!: Pokémon Tales Movie Special, which featured a whole theatre of children turning into characters from the Pokémon: Mewtwo Strikes Back film, including Pikachu, Mew, and most notably Mewtwo. In May 2001, Viz released a second children's book, Mewtwo's Watching You!, which featured a shy Mewtwo interestedly watching other Pokémon play.

In the manga series Pokémon Adventures, Team Rocket created Mewtwo, but due to the insufficient amount of genetic material at hand (being just a couple of Mew's eyelashes), Gym Leader Blaine - Team Rocket's head of research at the time - had to supplement the experiment with human DNA taken from his own right arm to fill in the gaps, which led to some of Mewtwo's DNA to enter his body as well. Because of the DNA that they share, the two are unable to be separated for very long without becoming ill. Later, another Pokémon, Entei, is able to break the bond between the two by burning away the DNA link in Blaine's arm, at which point Mewtwo leaves. It eventually helps the main character of the series, Red, fight against Team Rocket leader Giovanni and his Deoxys.

In 1998, Toshihiro Ono was asked to write a story detailing Mewtwo's origin to coincide with the release of Pokémon: The First Movie – Mewtwo Strikes Back. The 52-page comic, presented in the form of a flashback, was replaced midway by "The Birth of Mewtwo" animated short, resulting in little connection between Ono's work and the film. Regardless, it saw print as a side story for Pokémon: The Electric Tale of Pikachu in the July 1998 issue of CoroCoro Comic. In it, Mewtwo's creator, Dr. Fuji, takes on the role of a coach for the fully developed Pokémon, while his employers, Team Rocket, test its abilities. Learning of a plan to mass-produce it as a weapon, Fuji approaches Mewtwo and tells it to destroy the lab and Fuji himself. Mewtwo refuses, stating it can not harm the doctor, whom it regards as its father. Once captured by Team Rocket, Fuji tells Mewtwo that he is honored by the statement and is then killed. Angered by his death, Mewtwo destroys the lab and escapes. In the present, Mewtwo cries in its sleep as it dreams of the events.

=== In music ===
Mewtwo has been referenced in music before, notably in American rapper Ken Carson's track on the deluxe edition of his album A Great Chaos. The song's title was inspired by the Pokémon.

== Promotion and reception ==
Mewtwo's image is utilized for merchandise related to the Pokémon franchise, which includes toys, children's toothbrushes, and a playing piece for a Pokémon-themed version of Monopoly. Several action figures have been made, such as a posable figure by Hasbro in 2006 that included accessories to recreate its "Hyper Beam" and "Light Screen" attacks, and a six-inch-tall "talking" figurine by Jakks Pacific as part of a series to commemorate the anime's Battle Frontier story arc. Items marketed for adults featuring Mewtwo have also been sold and distributed by Nintendo, such as T-shirts. The island nation of Niue released a one-dollar coin featuring the character as part of a commemorative promotion for the Pokémon franchise, with Mewtwo on one side and the nation's coat of arms on the other. Mewtwo also appears on the port side of All Nippon Airways's Pocket Monsters Boeing 747 jumbo jet, alongside Mew.

In the games, Mewtwo is consistently noted as being one of the strongest opponents, and has been described in Pokémon Red and Blue as being "the best Pokémon in the game", as well as "one of the rarest — and hardest to catch". Because of the character's multiple strengths and few weaknesses, it changes how players approach playing against each other, causing players to either develop strategies solely to defeat an opposing Mewtwo, or to prohibit its use when battling other players. Kevin Slackie of Paste described Mewtwo as one of the series' best Pokemon, noting its presence as the penultimate boss in the original games and also several subsequent appearances, and how despite not having the same exposure as Pikachu it managed to remain relevant for over 20 years, "which itself is a testament to its amazing staying power as one of the most powerful Pokémon". Gavin Jasper of Den of Geek compared Mewtwo to Street Fighter series character Akuma, and praised it for having a backstory, personality and motivation unlike many pokémon in the franchise, stating "Genetic engineering in a world of wacky creatures is just asking for trouble and Mewtwo is the payoff." Dale Bishir of IGN described him as an icon, and the "go-to 'villain' Pokemon", noting its frequent presence in media for the series, including its starring role in two of the feature films.

In reception to extended media for the Pokémon franchise, Mewtwo was well received, and was described by Anime Classics Zettai!: 100 Must-See Japanese Animation Masterpieces as the best villain of the Pokémon film series, and one of Mewtwo Strikes Back's strongest elements. His portrayal has also been likened to Frankenstein's monster as a being born from artificial means and discontent with the fact. Theology Secretary for the Church of England Anne Richards described Mewtwo as representing a "parable about the pointlessness of force", and praised the character for displaying the Christian value of redemption. Other reactions have been mixed. While it has been cited as a "complex and compelling villain" by some critics, its goal of world domination was received as a trait shared by "…every anime villain…", and likened to a James Bond villain by Daily Record. However, Animerica praised Mewtwo as a character with "philosophical depth" as well as for serving as "an adversary of almost infinite power and genuine malice" that the anime series had been lacking. Ken Hollings of Sight & Sound described Mewtwo as "brooding, articulate and vengeful where the other Pokémon remain bright blobs of wordless energy", and "Like a troubled elder brother, Mewtwo represents an older order of experience."

Mewtwo's character and design have also been analyzed in academic study. The book Pikachu's Global Adventure: The Rise and Fall of Pokémon noted Mewtwo as popular with older male children who tend to be drawn to "tough or scary" characters; Mew in contrast was described as a polar opposite, a character popular with young girls who tend to be drawn to "cute" characters. Others books, such as Media and the Make-believe Worlds of Children, have noted a similar comparison, citing Mewtwo as "more aggressive-looking" compared to Mew and emphasizing the importance of the contrast for children. The book Gaming Cultures and Place in Asia-Pacific compares Sugimori's design of Mewtwo to that of Japanese tokusatsu films, namely monster films like the 1954 Godzilla in creating "monstrous yet familiar silhouettes from the past renewed agency in the form of eyes and expressions which cut through the viewer".

== Notes ==
1. The Japanese texts of the Pokémon Mansion Journals as well as various Pokédex entries state that an individual scientist created Mewtwo, as opposed to a team of researchers like in the anime.
