= Jay Goede =

American actor (born 1963)

- Born: Jay Philip Goede; November 2, 1963 (age 62); Mound, Minnesota, U.S.
- Other name: Philip Bartlett
- Education: University of Minnesota, Twin Cities (BFA); Yale University (MFA)
- Occupation: Stage actor
- Website: jaygoede.com

Jay Philip Goede (born November 2, 1963) is an American actor who is best known for his stage roles on Broadway in New York City. Goede has been mostly known to voice Mewtwo in Pokémon: The First Movie in the English version of the film.

== Career ==
Goede appeared on Broadway in the original productions of Angels in America (1993) Sex and Longing (opposite Sigourney Weaver) (1995) A Year with Frog and Toad (2003), and with Valerie Harper in Looped (2009). Other stage credits include the Broadway production of The Play's the Thing (1995), the off-Broadway production of The Most Fabulous Story Ever Told (1998), Miracle Brothers (2005) and the 1999 national tour of Cabaret. In 2006, Goede played the title character in the musical How the Grinch Stole Christmas! at the Old Globe in San Diego, California.

Goede has played several minor roles on television. He voiced Mewtwo in the English dub of Pokémon: The First Movie (under the name Philip Bartlett in the end credits). However, his real name is given in the brochure for Pokémon Live! where he did the vocals for Mewtwo's surprise cameo.

== Education ==
Goede received a Bachelor of Fine Arts from the University of Minnesota. He then earned a Master in Fine Arts in 1991 from the Yale School of Drama, where he studied with acting teacher Earle Gister among others.

== Teaching ==
Goede has been a visiting instructor at the University of Minnesota (2006), the University of Miami (2009), and the Art Institute of Fort Lauderdale.
