= Jigglypuff =

Pokémon species

- Pokémon character
- Jigglypuff artwork by Ken Sugimori
- First game: Pokémon Red and Blue (1996)
- Designed by: Ken Sugimori (finalized)
- Portrayed by: Leah Smith (Pokémon Live!)
- Voiced by: English: Rachael Lillis Michele Knotz; Japanese: Mika Kanai

In-universe information
- Species: Pokémon
- Type: Normal and Fairy

Jigglypuff (/ˈdʒɪɡlipʌf/ JIG-lee-puf), known in Japan as Purin (Japanese: プリン), is a Pokémon species. Jigglypuff first appeared in the video games Pokémon Red and Blue and subsequent sequels, later appearing in various merchandise, spinoff titles and animated and printed adaptations of the franchise. Jigglypuff's English voice was originally provided by Rachael Lillis, later being replaced by Michele Knotz, and is voiced by Mika Kanai in Japanese. In the live-action musical Pokémon Live!, Jigglypuff is portrayed by Leah Smith. Jigglypuff is also known for singing a lullaby in the Pokémon anime series.

Known as the Balloon Pokémon, Jigglypuff evolves from Igglybuff when it reaches a certain point of happiness, and evolves into Wigglytuff when exposed to a Moon Stone. Its English name is a combination of the words "jiggly" and "puff", relating to its jelly-like appearance. The character has been featured in a recurring role in the anime series and served as the focus for several printed adaptions of the franchise. Since it appeared in the Pokémon series, Jigglypuff has received generally positive reception. It has been featured in several forms of merchandise, including figurines, plush toys, and the Pokémon Trading Card Game. It also has appeared as a playable character in every entry of the Super Smash Bros. series.

== Design and characteristics ==
Jigglypuff is a species of fictional creatures called Pokémon created for the Pokémon media franchise. Developed by Game Freak and published by Nintendo, the Japanese franchise began in 1996 with the video games Pokémon Red and Green for the Game Boy, which were later released in North America as Pokémon Red and Blue in 1998. In these games and their sequels, the player assumes the role of a Trainer whose goal is to capture and use the creatures' special abilities to combat other Pokémon. Some Pokémon can transform into stronger species through a process called evolution via various means, such as exposure to specific items. Each Pokémon has one or two elemental types, which define its advantages and disadvantages when battling other Pokémon. A major goal in each game is to complete the Pokédex, a comprehensive Pokémon encyclopedia, by capturing, evolving, and trading with other Trainers to obtain individuals from all Pokémon species.

Jigglypuff was one of one hundred and fifty one different generation I Pokémon designs conceived by Game Freak's character development team and finalized by Ken Sugimori for the first-generation of Pocket Monsters games Red and Green, which were localized outside Japan as Pokémon Red and Blue. Its Japanese name "Purin", derives from the Japanese loanword for custard or pudding. Nintendo decided to give the various Pokémon species "clever and descriptive names" related to their appearance or features when translating the game for western audiences as a means to make the characters more relatable to American children. According to director Junichi Masuda, there were initially concerns that Jigglypuff's cuter design would not take off with western audiences, and considerations to redesign it were made, but ultimately scrapped. Deciding to use a name better suited for its jelly-like appearance, the species was renamed "Jigglypuff." When a Jigglypuff is exposed to a Moon Stone, it evolves into Wigglytuff. It has a pre-evolution, Igglybuff, which evolves when it reaches a certain point of happiness. In English, Jigglypuff has been portrayed by Rachael Lillis and Michele Knotz, and it has been portrayed by Mika Kanai in Japanese. In the stage musical Pokémon Live!, Jigglypuff was portrayed by Leah Smith.

Known as the Balloon Pokémon, Jigglypuff can inflate its body like a balloon or flatten it. Jigglypuff are characterized by putting their enemies to sleep by singing a lullaby. Before beginning to sing, they mesmerize the opponent with their soft, glowing eyes and, if they inflate themselves, they can sing for longer periods of time. Game Freak's staff have noted Jigglypuff as both one of their and the public's favorite Pokémon, in terms of both anime and video game appearances, and it was one of the more heavily pushed and marketed Pokémon prior to Pikachu being the determined mascot for the series. During development of the film Detective Pikachu, Jigglypuff's design initially started as very fluffy, but was rejected, with The Pokémon Company stating it should look more like pigskin. This design did not look as appealing, and thus more fur was added to the design. The design was made to resemble "fur groomed into a ball" instead of a more balloon-like design.

== Appearances ==
=== In video games ===
Jigglypuff first appears in Pokémon Red and Blue. In Pokémon Gold and Silver, a pre-evolution, Igglybuff, was introduced. It later appeared in several sequels, including Pokémon Ruby and Sapphire, Pokémon FireRed and LeafGreen, Pokémon Diamond and Pearl, and Pokémon HeartGold and SoulSilver. Jigglypuff was a "Normal" type in the series, but since Pokémon X and Y, Jigglypuff's typing was changed, now gaining an additional "Fairy" type. A Paradox Pokémon heavily resembling Jigglypuff, named Scream Tail, appears in Pokémon Scarlet and Violet.

Outside of the main series, Jigglypuff has appeared in Pokémon Pinball, Pokémon Snap, Pokémon Conquest, the Pokémon Mystery Dungeon games, Pokémon GO, Pokémon UNITE, the Pokémon Ranger games, and the Pokémon Rumble games. Jigglypuff is a playable character in all five Super Smash Bros. games. It is one of the two original representatives of the Pokémon franchise in the Super Smash Bros. series along with Pikachu. Despite not being a lead character in the Pokémon franchise, game director Masahiro Sakurai selected it to appear in Super Smash Bros. due to its similarities to Kirby, which allowed the staff to reuse the model and many animations as a base for Jigglypuff. Jigglypuff's moves in its Super Smash Bros. appearances are Sing, Rollout, Pound, and Rest. Rest's mechanics are changed entirely; instead of recovering Jigglypuff's health like in the Pokémon series, the move is a brutally strong move that launches opponents. However, if it misses, it can leave Jigglypuff open to attack.

=== In anime ===
In the Pokémon anime series, Jigglypuff is a recurring character who aspires to be a great singer after the inspiration of Ash and company. Unfortunately, most potential audiences fall asleep before the song finishes. Jigglypuff's singing can often prove problematic to the series' protagonists, as it causes all who can hear it to fall asleep. It carries around a trademark marker, which it uses as a microphone due to its resemblance to such when it is capped. When it realizes those who have been subject to its song have fallen asleep, it angrily uses the marker to draw on their faces. Jigglypuff is voiced by Mika Kanai in the original Japanese release, while in the English dub, it was originally voiced by Rachael Lillis in the 4Kids Entertainment dub, later being replaced by Michele Knotz when The Pokémon Company International began dubbing the series.

This Jigglypuff's appearances began to decline, eventually making one last appearance in Pokémon: Advanced. It remained absent from the series until Pokémon the Series: Sun and Moon, where it once again became a recurring character.

In 2006, Viz released ten DVDs based around individual Pokémon in celebration of Pokémon's tenth anniversary in the United States. The Pokémon featured were determined by an online poll on pokemon.com. Out of forty-five choices, Jigglypuff's received second place and was released as volume two, with Pikachu's being the first volume. Another compilation of Pokémon anime episodes, including "The Song of Jigglypuff" in which Jigglypuff is introduced, is available on both VHS and DVD, entitled "Jigglypuff Pop", which was released by Viz Video (now Viz Media) and 4Kids Entertainment.

=== In printed adaptations ===
Jigglypuff appears in various Pokémon manga adaptations. The Magical Pokémon Journey manga series has a female Jigglypuff as one of the main characters, parodying Hello Kitty. The Jigglypuff in Magical Pokémon Journey is spoiled and rich, living in a mansion with Wigglytuff and Squirtle, the former being her sister and the latter her butler. Jigglypuff's Magic Lullaby is part of the Pokémon Tales series for very young children. Written by Megumi Hayashibara and illustrated by Kagemaru Himeno, it tells the story of a Jigglypuff who wants to make the other Pokémon happy by singing for them. Yet, as usual, her song puts them to sleep, and this makes her very sad until her friend helps her resolve the situation.

In the Pokémon Adventures manga, one of the main characters, Green, has a Jigglypuff which is capable of swelling up to several times its size. This allows Green to float with it like a hot-air balloon as well as block narrow passageways—a tactic instrumental in helping Silver and her escape the Masked Man. It evolved in Breaking the Restraint into a Wigglytuff alongside two of Green's other Pokémon with the power of her Moon Stones.

=== In other media ===
Jigglypuff made a cameo appearance in a season six episode of Last Week Tonight with John Oliver, in which the host accidentally kills one while playing Pokémon GO. Jigglypuff is one of the Pokémon that appear in the Pokémon: Detective Pikachu film, voiced using archived recordings of Rachael Lillis from the anime. The character briefly appears at a coffee bar after it accidentally put its trainer to sleep with its song.

== Promotion and reception ==
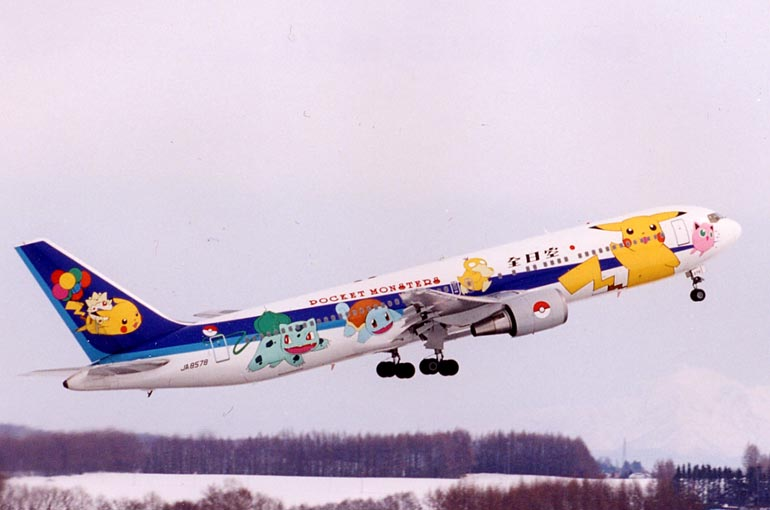
Jigglypuff and several other Pokémon on an ANA Boeing 767, c. 1998

Jigglypuff is often featured on products and in promotion for the series. An example of this is the full-sized Pokémon 747 aircraft by Boeing. Jigglypuff appeared on the starboard nose of the original white 1998 aircraft and above the starboard wing of the 1999 blue aircraft. Jigglypuff was also on the nose of the international version of the plane. Jigglypuff has been made into several different toy and plush forms, as well as other items. A Jigglypuff Bluetooth speaker was made by GameStop’s ThinkGeek brand, and has been approved by the Federal Communications Commission. A variety merchandise of Jigglypuff has been also made such as clothing, plushies, and jewelry. The shoe company Crocs collaborated with The Pokémon Company for the 30th anniversary of the Pokémon franchise, releasing "Platform Clog" designed and themed on Jigglypuff.

Jigglypuff has proven to be a popular character since its introduction. Jigglypuff has been noted as one of the series' most popular characters and one of Nintendo's mascots. The book Pikachu's Global Adventure: The Rise and Fall of Pokémon' described Jigglypuff as popular with a young, female audience across the franchise as a whole, attributing said popularity to both the immediate attraction of children to its pink color and its contrast to Pokémon species more popular with young males, such as Squirtle or Charmander. Author Harry Schlesinger also noted that Jigglypuff was popular among girls. The journal Sex Roles noted that while Jigglypuff's gender in the anime was never explicitly stated, it was identified by a majority of people as a female character in the series. Additionally, it was the most often named "female" Pokémon by children when asked to recall one, which the study attributed to its pink color and ability to sing its opponents to sleep. The Australian Journal of Language and Literacy cited Jigglypuff as a tool to use for introducing children to drama, citing its mannerisms in the anime.

Andrew Tei of Mania.com complained that Jigglypuff's portrayal in the anime quickly becomes irritating. Carolyn Gudmundson of GamesRadar+ disagreed, calling Jigglypuff's anime appearances "totally badass" while also criticizing its unoriginal, overused design. She later described it as falling into the "huggable pink blob" archetype Pokémon, which she believed to be one of the more overused Pokémon designs. James Whitbrook of Gizmodo praised its appearance in the original games, highlighting its uncommon encounter rate and unique design as making it standout in comparison to other wild Pokémon. He also noted its high popularity, especially in marketing, labelling it as "ascendant" in comparison to other Pokémon in the series due to its notability. Steven Bogos of The Escapist similarly described Jigglypuff as "iconic" but criticized its lack of power.

Jigglypuff's floaty and campy playstyle in the Super Smash Bros. series has led to some controversy. During a 2019 tournament of Super Smash Bros. Melee, a player decided to quit due to an opponent who played Jigglypuff repeatedly stalling. Largely credited with elevating the Melee community's perception of Jigglypuff's viability in competition and setting the standard of how to play the character, professional Super Smash Bros. player Hungrybox relies heavily on a defensive, counterattack-centric playstyle revolving around avoiding his opponent until he finds an opportunity to attack and capitalize on their mistakes. It is considered a "high risk high reward" playstyle, as Hungrybox's usual goal is to eventually hit his opponent with Rest, a move unique to Jigglypuff which inflicts instant high knockback on opponents, but leaves Jigglypuff open to attack. The tournament Super Smash Con made some rules against "ledge-camping", as the character is so effective with the tactic that some people considered it "game-breaking" and making the game not fun to watch.

In 2018, Jigglypuff's singing habits became an Internet meme, and a Twitter account known as @jigglysinging was created to overlay popular songs over a clip of Jigglypuff singing. A Las Vegas street was also named after Jigglypuff.
