= Rachael Lillis =

American voice actress (1969–2024)

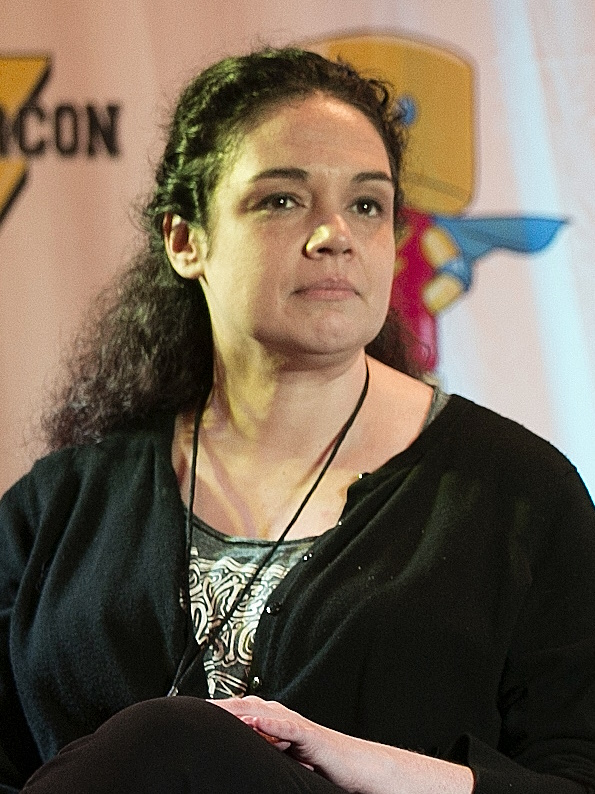
- Lillis in 2017
- Born: July 8, 1969; Niagara Falls, New York, U.S.
- Died: August 10, 2024 (aged 55); Los Angeles, California, U.S.
- Resting place: Ashes scattered in the waters of Los Angeles
- Other name: Rachael McCabe
- Education: Smith College (BS)
- Occupation: Voice actress
- Years active: 1997–2019
- Website: Official website (archive)

Rachael Lillis (July 8, 1969 (Note: "Though it was originally reported that Lillis was 46 [at the time of her death], The New York Times confirmed with her sister, Laurie Orr, that she was born on July 8, 1969.") – August 10, 2024) was an American voice actress. She was best known for her performances as Misty, Jessie, and Jigglypuff in the first eight seasons of the English dub of the TV series Pokémon. She also provided voices for many other animation works and video games.

== Early life ==
Rachael Lillis was born to John and Constance Lillis (née Zafuto) in Niagara Falls, New York, on July 8, 1969. Her father served in the U.S. Navy and was a maintenance manager. She was the youngest of six children. Lillis and her family later moved to Plano, Texas. Lillis attended Smith College, where she was a premed student. She trained in opera before she became a voice actor. She studied voice acting in Boston and moved to New York City in 1996. She cited Mel Blanc and June Foray among her influences.

== Career ==
Lillis became known for voicing Misty and Jessie in the English dub of the Pokémon anime. She also voiced Pokémon such as Goldeen, Jigglypuff, Vulpix and Venonat on the show. Lillis appeared in 423 Pokémon episodes. She voiced various Pokémon in the Super Smash Bros. video games. She was also the voice of Utena Tenjo in Revolutionary Girl Utena, and voiced characters in Winx Club, Hunter × Hunter, Your Lie in April and Gall Force, among other shows.

Lillis's last voice acting role was in Hunter × Hunter: The Last Mission. According to Veronica Taylor, Lillis had difficulty finding work during the COVID-19 pandemic, in part due to a lack of recording equipment at her home.

In 2023, Lillis attended a Pokémon cast reunion in London.

== Illness and death ==
In May 2024, a GoFundMe campaign created by Lillis's sister announced that Lillis had developed breast cancer. Several of her fellow actors shared the campaign to help raise money for her care. The campaign raised $98,000 by the time she died, with the money going towards Lillis's remaining bills, a memorial service and cancer research. The cancer spread to her spine, which left her barely able to walk, and she eventually moved into a Los Angeles nursing home to receive care.

Lillis died on August 10, 2024, at the age of 55. In 2025, money was raised to donate a bench in her honor in Central Park's Upper West Side. It is #7603 on the path between 106th St and 108th St off Central Park West.

== Filmography ==
=== Voice roles ===
==== Film ====
List of voice performances in films
Year	Title	Role	Notes	Refs
1999	Pokémon: The First Movie	Misty, Jessie, Vulpix, Venonat, Goldeen, Jigglypuff		
2000	Pokémon: The Movie 2000	Misty, Jessie, Vulpix, Venonat, Goldeen, Jigglypuff		
2001	Night on the Galactic Railroad	Marceau		
2001	Pokémon: Mewtwo Returns	Misty, Jessie, Jigglypuff, Vulpix, Goldeen		
2001	Pokémon 3: Spell of the Unown	Misty, Jessie, Jigglypuff, Vulpix, Goldeen		
2001	Revolutionary Girl Utena: The Movie	Utena Tenjō		
2002	Pokémon 4Ever	Misty, Jessie, Jigglypuff, Vulpix, Goldeen, Torchic, Beautifly		
2003	Pokémon Heroes	Misty, Jessie, Jigglypuff, Vulpix, Goldeen, Torchic, Beautifly		
2004	Pokémon: Jirachi Wish Maker	Misty, Jessie, Jigglypuff, Vulpix, Goldeen, Torchic, Beautifly		
2005	Pokémon: Destiny Deoxys	Misty, Jessie, Jigglypuff, Vulpix, Goldeen, Torchic, Beautifly		
2006	Pokémon: Lucario and the Mystery of Mew	Misty, Jessie, Jigglypuff, Vulpix, Goldeen, Torchic, Beautifly		
2012	Berserk: The Golden Age Arc I The Egg of the King	Princess Charlotte		
2017	Fate/stay night: Heaven's Feel	Sella	Home video edition only; later replaced by Julia McIlvaine in Heaven's Feel III. spring song	
2019	Hunter × Hunter: The Last Mission	Cocco	Last role.	
2019	Pokémon Detective Pikachu	Jigglypuff	Archival recording	

==== Anime ====
List of dubbing performances in anime
Year	Title	Role	Notes	Refs
1997	Takegami: Guardian of Darkness	Satsuki	First principal role in a series	
1998	The Slayers	Cally, Paula		
1998	Revolutionary Girl Utena	Utena Tenjō, Chu Chu		
1998–2006	Pokémon	Misty, Jessie, Jigglypuff, Pikachu (rarely), various		
1999	Slayers Next	Martina Zoana Mel Navratilova, Kira		
2000	Geobreeders	Takumi Sakurai		
2000	Irresponsible Captain Tylor	Yuriko Star, Noriko		
2000	Shamanic Princess	Mimi Joyman, Suzanna White		
2000	Boogiepop Phantom	Nagi Kirima, Manaka Kisaragi		
2000	RG Veda	Ashura	Central Park Media Dub	
2000	Gokudo	Miroku, Mora, Nihi		
2000	Harlock Saga	Fricka		
2000	Twin Signal	Elara, Number 3		
2002	Berserk	Princess Charlotte		
2002	His and Her Circumstances	Miyako Mizawa, Aya Sawada, various		
2002	Maetel Legend	Queen La Andromeda Prometheum		
2002	Now and Then, Here and There	Boo, Sis		
2002	Voltage Fighter Gowcaizer	Omni Exist		
2003	Alien Nine	Miyu Tamaki		
2003	DNA²	Ami Kurimoto		
2003	K.O. Beast	V-Sion		
2003	Sonic X	Danny		
2003–2006	Animation Runner Kuromi	Mai Horaguchi		
2004	Comic Party	Mizuki Takase		
2004	Gravitation	Ayaka Usami		
2004	Nana Seven of Seven	Hitomi Onodera, Mitsuko Suzuki		
2004	Shrine of the Morning Mist	Shizuka Midoh		
2004	World of Narue	Kanaka Nanase, Miss Īzuka		
2005	Hammerboy	Poplar		
2005	Midori Days	Haruka Kasugano		
2005	Mew Mew Power	Gym Team Girl		
2005	Shingu: Secret of the Stellar Wars	Momoe Sanemori		
2005–2010	Genshiken	Kanako Ono		
2006	Boys Be...	Aya Kurihara		
2006	Pokémon Chronicles	Misty, Jessie		
2007	Dinosaur King	Dr. Reese Drake, Ursula, Laura		
2007	The Third: The Girl with the Blue Eye	Rona Fauna		
2008	Pokémon Mystery Dungeon: Explorers of Time and Darkness	Sunflora, Shinx brother		
2010	Mobile Suit Gundam Unicorn	Micott Bartsch		
2011	Bakuman	Amy		
2015	Fate/stay night: Unlimited Blade Works	Sella	As Rachael McCabe	
2016	Your Lie in April	Ryoko Miyazono		
2016–2019	Hunter × Hunter	Mito Freecss, Cocco		

==== Animation ====
List of voice performances in animation
Year	Title	Role	Notes	Refs
2001–2003	Cubix	Hela Nemo		
2003	Teenage Mutant Ninja Turtles	Tomoe Ame		
2004	Shadow of the Elves	Thalia		
2004–2006	Winx Club	Headmistress Faragonda, various	4Kids dub	
2006–2010	Chaotic	Intress		

==== Video games ====
List of voice performances in video games
Year	Title	Role	Notes	Refs
1999	Super Smash Bros.	Jigglypuff	Grouped under Voice Actors	
2000	Pokémon Puzzle League	Misty, Jessie, Jigglypuff		
2000	Valkyrie Profile	Jelanda, Lyseria, Mystina		
2001	Super Smash Bros. Melee	Jigglypuff	Grouped under Voices	
2003	Ape Escape 2	Natalie (Note: The character is known as Natalie in the North American version of the game, while she is known as Natsumi, same as her original Japanese name, in the United Kingdom and PAL versions of the game.)	North American English dub	
2008	Super Smash Bros. Brawl	Jigglypuff, Goldeen	Grouped under Character Voice	
2014	Super Smash Bros. for Nintendo 3DS / Wii U	Jigglypuff, Goldeen	Grouped under Character Voice	
2015	Lego Jurassic World		As Rachael McCabe	
2018	Super Smash Bros. Ultimate	Jigglypuff, Goldeen	Grouped under Character Voices	

==== Audiobooks ====
List of voice performances in audiobooks
Year	Title	Author	Notes	Refs
2005	Diary of a Fairy Godmother	Esme Raji Codell		
2006	Miss Watson Wants Your Teeth	Alison McGhee		

=== Production credits ===
==== Script adaptation ====
Year	Title	Medium	Notes	Refs
2001	Apocalypse Zero	TV		
2001	Gokudo	Television		
2002	Boogiepop Phantom	Television		
2003	K.O. Beast	Television		

==== Translator ====
Year	Title	Medium	Notes	Refs
2002	Cleopatra DC	Television		
