= William Hogeland =

American historian, author, and commentator

- Born: 1955
- Occupation: Writer
- Language: English language

Website
- williamhogeland.substack.com

William Hogeland is an American writer.

== Works ==
- The Whiskey Rebellion : George Washington, Alexander Hamilton, and the frontier rebels who challenged America's newfound sovereignty. New York: Scribner. 2006. ISBN 978-0-7432-5491-5. OCLC 1036919582.
- Inventing American History. Cambridge, Mass.: MIT Press. 2009. ISBN 978-0-262-25496-0. OCLC 320445004.
- Founding Finance: how debt, speculation, foreclosures, protests, and crackdowns made us a nation. Austin: University of Texas Press. 2012. ISBN 978-0-292-74450-9. OCLC 820123232.
- Autumn of the Black Snake: the creation of the U.S. Army and the invasion that opened the West. New York: Farrar, Straus and Giroux. 2017. ISBN 978-0-374-71158-0. OCLC 987436924.
- The Hamilton Scheme: An Epic Tale of Money and Power in the American Founding. New York: Farrar, Straus and Giroux. 2024. ISBN 978-0-374-16783-7. OCLC 1435949681.
