= Eric Stuart =

American voice actor and musician

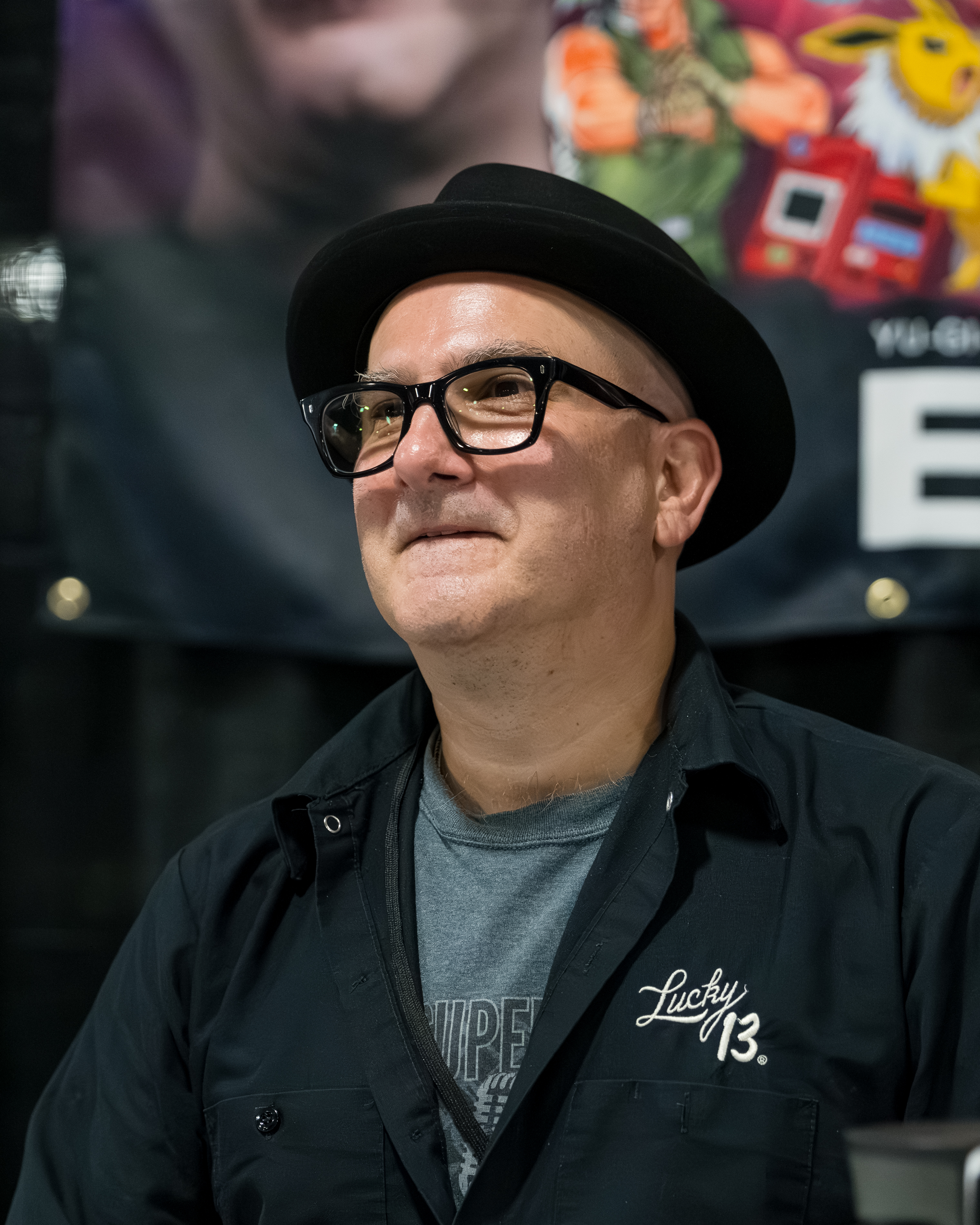
- Stuart at GalaxyCon Nashville in 2026
- Born: Brooklyn, New York, U.S.
- Occupations: Voice actor; musician
- Years active: 1995–present
- Musical career
- Genres: Rock; country; americana
- Instruments: Vocals; guitar
- Label: Widow's Peak
- Website: www.ericstuart.com

Eric Stuart is an American voice actor and musician whose clients include 4Kids Entertainment, NYAV Post, and Central Park Media.

Among some of his prominent roles, he is best known for being the voice of Brock and James from seasons 1–8 of the original Pokémon anime, as well as voicing Seto Kaiba in the Yu-Gi-Oh! Duel Monsters anime series and Meta Knight in Kirby: Right Back at Ya!.

== Early life ==
Stuart was born in Brooklyn, New York to a modern dancer mother and a criminal attorney father.

== Voice acting career ==
He provides voices for English dubs of anime, cartoons, and video games. Some of his most prominent roles include Brock and James in Pokémon from seasons 1–8, Seto Kaiba in Yu-Gi-Oh!, and Gourry Gabriev in Slayers.

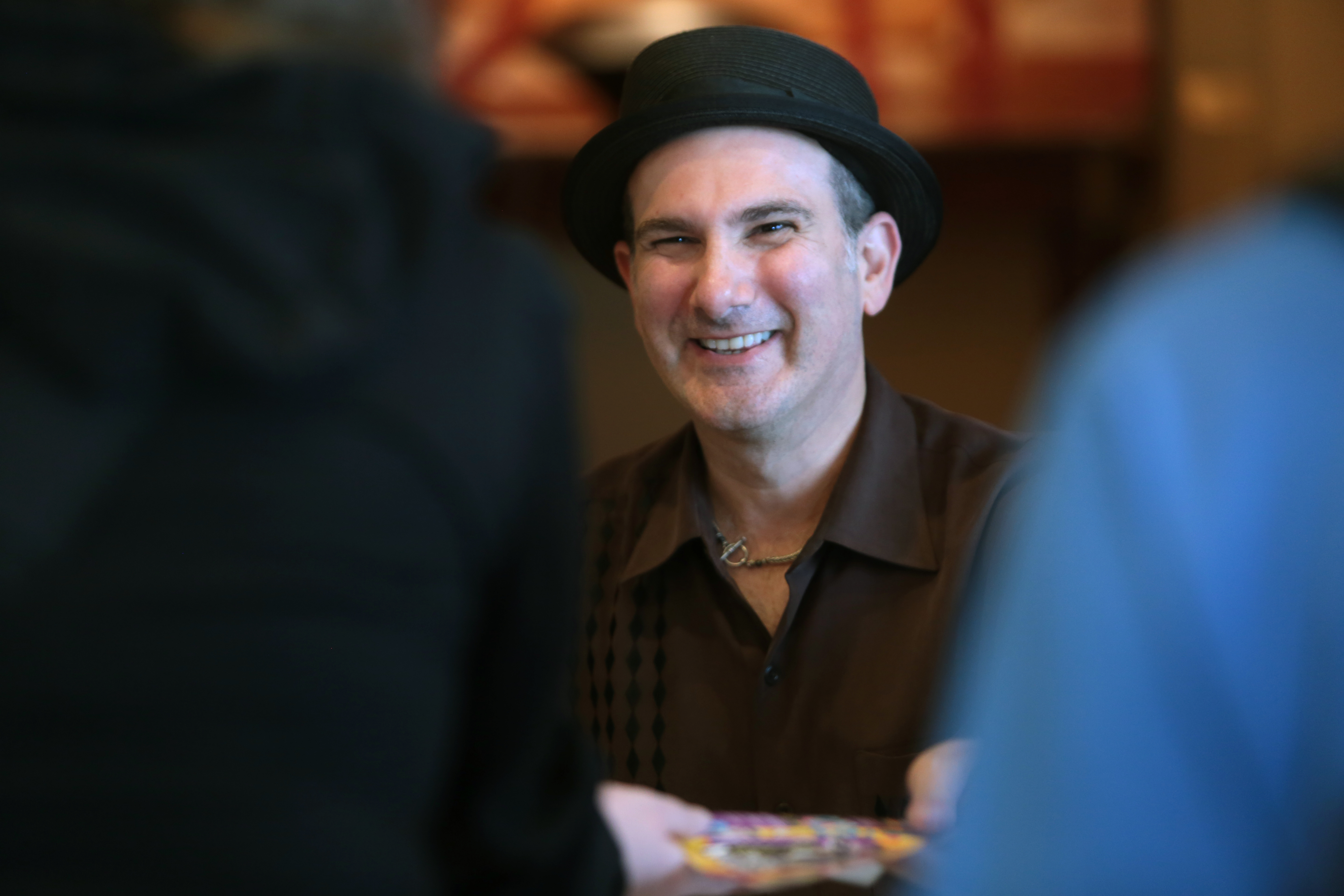
Stuart speaking with fans at 2016 Saboten Con in Phoenix, Arizona.

== Music career ==
As a stage performer, he and his band, Eric Stuart Band, have toured with Peter Frampton (1999, 2000), Ringo Starr & His All-Starr Band (1997), Lynyrd Skynyrd (1997), and has opened for Jethro Tull (1997), Julian Cope (1995), Hall & Oates (1997, 1998) and Chicago (1995, 1997, 1998) as well.

In 2000, Frampton produced his album Blue, Dressed in Black.

In 2007, he released his fourth full-length album In The County Of Kings as the Eric Stuart Band under Stuart's own independent label, Widow's Peak Records. The title of the album comes from Kings County, Brooklyn, where Stuart was born and raised. In addition, the front cover art depicts the Brooklyn Bridge and New York City in juxtaposition with the Great Pyramid, the Sphinx of Giza, and the Valley of the Kings, which are in Egypt. The musical style of In The County Of Kings is more country-sounding than any previous Eric Stuart Band album, and is described by Eric Stuart as "concrete country." With regard to this, Stuart writes,

I was trying to come up with a way to explain the type of music I play. Americana was too rootsy, folk-rock only touched on a part of my sound and county/rock made it sound like I wore a cowboy hat. I am born and raised in Brooklyn, New York, but I play music with a strong lyrical, melodic, story based approach. There are many country elements as well. I thought the combination of "Concrete" to connect with the sidewalks and buildings I grew up around as well as the rock connotations that word brings plus the "Country" would show I was touching on string songwriting and storytelling that went with country music.

In The County Of Kings includes a re-release of Stuart's songs "The Bottom Line" (1996, from the album Picture Perfect World), and "Paint the Town Tonight" (2000, from the album BombShellShocked). The album also incorporates more guest musicians than in previous ESB albums. Stuart sings with his sister Barbara Brousal in "The Land Of What Might Have Been." Not all the songs call in numerous accompaniments however; in "This Love," Stuart is only accompanied by band members Jenna Malizia (background vocals) and Questar Welsh (background vocals and keyboards).

== Filmography ==
=== Film ===
List of dubbing performances in feature films
Year	Title	Role	Crew role, notes	Source
1999	Pokémon: The First Movie	Brock, James, Squirtle		
2000	Pokémon: The Movie 2000	James		
2001	Pokémon 3: The Movie	Brock, James		
2001	Night on the Galactic Railroad	Lighthouse Keeper	English dub	
2002	The Ninja Dragon	Ninja Dragon		
2004	Yu-Gi-Oh! The Movie: Pyramid of Light	Seto Kaiba	Voice director	
2017	Yu-Gi-Oh!: The Dark Side of Dimensions	Seto Kaiba		

List of dubbing performances in direct-to-video and television films
Year	Title	Role	Crew role, notes	Source
2000	Pokémon: Mewtwo Returns	Brock, James		
2002	Pokémon 4Ever	Brock, James		
2003	Pokémon Heroes	Brock, James		
2004	Pokémon: Jirachi Wish Maker	Brock, Hippie, James	Voice director	
2005	Pokémon: Destiny Deoxys	Brock, James		

Voice-over performance in live-action film
Year	Title	Role	Notes	Source
2013	Movie 43	Narrator (voice)	Segment: "Victory's Glory"; Nominated – Golden Raspberry Award for Worst Screen Combo (shared with the entire cast)	

=== Anime ===
List of dubbing performances in anime
Year	Title	Role	Crew role, notes	Source
1995–2009	Slayers series	Gourry Gabriev		
1996	Gall Force: Eternal Story	OX-11, Toil, Ail		
1996	Yu Yu Hakusho: Eizou Hakusho 2	Koenma		
1996	Grappler Baki: The Ultimate Fighter	Announcer		
1997	Art of Fighting	Jack Turner, John Crawley		
1998–2006	Pokémon	Brock, James, Squirtle, Scyther, others	4Kids Dub, voice director (some episodes)	
2000	Labyrinth of Flames	Galan	Central Park Media dub	
2001	Descendants of Darkness	Yutaka Watari		
2001	Tama and Friends	Rockney		
2001	Fighting Foodons	Burnt Meatballs, Cole Slawter, Gazmacho, Additional Voices		
2001–06	Yu-Gi-Oh! Duel Monsters	Seto Kaiba, Kemo, Sid, others	Voice director	
2002–2006	Kirby: Right Back at Ya!	Meta Knight, Sword Knight, Blade Knight, Gus, Coo, Additional Voices		
2002	Ultimate Muscle: The Kinnikuman Legacy	Dik Dik Van Dik, Mac Metaphor, Kinnikuman / King Muscle, Adversarious, Dial Bolic, Geronimo, Clawdaddy, Sgt. Muscle, Hanzo, The Protector, Jagg-Ed	Voice director	
2003–2005	Shaman King	Marco, Flying Zen Brother #1, Additional Voices		
2003	Animation Runner Kuromi	Mizuho Tanonaka, Shin Kumegawa, others		
2004	F-Zero: GP Legend	Black Shadow, Octoman		
2004	Here is Greenwood	Number One, Furusawa, Lupin, Tochizawa	Central Park Media dub	
2004–2006	One Piece	Narrator, Gold Roger Sham, Henzo	4Kids dub	
2005	Magical DoReMi	Vice Principal Shoople		
2005–2008	Yu-Gi-Oh! GX	Bastion Misawa, Seto Kaiba, Titan, Kagemaru, Ojama Black, Ojama King, others	Voice director	
2006	Animation Runner Kuromi 2	Mizuho Tanonaka		
2007–2010	Dinosaur King	Dr. Z, Patrick, Spartacus (minor role), Mr. Copper (minor role)		
2008–2011	Yu-Gi-Oh! 5Ds	Bootleg owner, Sir Gil de Randsborg, Lug, Mr. Pitts (season 2), Sergio, Boss, Elsworth		
2012–2014	Yu-Gi-Oh! Zexal	Scorch, Jinlon		
2021	Shaman King (2021)	Marco, Cebin Mendel	Netflix dub; reboot	
2023	Yu-Gi-Oh! Sevens	Valencian Kallister		

=== Animation ===
List of voice performances in animation
Year	Title	Role	Crew role, notes	Source
2003	The Fight for the Fox Box	Diabolic		
2003	Teenage Mutant Ninja Turtles	Hamato Yoshi, Murakami Gennosuke, Quarry, Harry 'The Schlub' Parker, Additional Voices		
2004	Incredible Crash Dummies	Crunch	Voice director	
2005	G.I. Joe: Sigma Six	Hi-Tech, others	Voice director	
2006–09	Viva Piñata	Les, Mongo, Norman, Ruffians, others	Voice director, producer	
2008–09	Gogoriki	Shadow Prince Loveamore, others	Voice director, writer	
2012	The Illusionauts		Voice director	
2013	Operation Freedom Force		Voice director	

=== Video games ===
List of voice and dubbing performances in video games
Year	Title	Role	Crew role, notes	Source
1999	Pikachu’s Winter Vacation	Brock, Squirtle, Electrode, Dexter		
1999	Valkyrie Profile	Grey, Lucian		
2000	Labyrinth of Flames	Galan		
2001	RG Veda	Bishamonten		
2001	Shadow Hearts	Yuri Hyuga		
2003	Teenage Mutant Ninja Turtles	Harry, Quarry		
2003	Pokémon Channel	Squirtle Trio		
2004	Teenage Mutant Ninja Turtles 2: Battle Nexus	Additional voices		
2004	Yu-Gi-Oh! Reshef of Destruction	Seto Kaiba		
2004	Yu-Gi-Oh! Destiny Board Traveler	Seto Kaiba, Kaibaman		
2004	Yu-Gi-Oh! Capsule Monster Coliseum	Seto Kaiba		
2016	Yu-Gi-Oh! Duel Links	Seto Kaiba, Dox, Bastion Misawa		

=== Web ===
Year	Title	Role	Notes	Source
2013	Teenage Pokémon	Brock (voice)	Episode: "Brock, Mental Health and Lets-Plays"	

== Discography ==
- Curiosity (1996)
- Picture Perfect World (1997)
- Eric Stuart (1998)
- Blue, Dressed in Black (2000)
- BombShellShocked (2003)
- In the County of Kings (2007)
- Empty Frame of Reference (2009)
- Falls on Me (2011)
- Lipstick and Barbed Wire (2013)
- My Kind of Danger (2018)
