= Misty (Pokémon) =

Pokémon gym leader

- Pokémon character
- Misty, as seen in the Pokémon TV series
- First game: Pokémon Red and Blue (1996)
- Created by: Ken Sugimori
- Designed by: Ken Sugimori; Atsuko Nishida (anime)
- Voiced by: English: Rachael Lillis (Seasons 1–8) Michele Knotz (MoMP–25, Mewtwo Strikes Back: Evolution) Reba Buhr (Pokémon Masters); Japanese: Mayumi Iizuka (anime) Ayane Sakura (Pokémon Masters)

Misty, known as Kasumi (Japanese: カスミ) in Japan, is a fictional character in the Pokémon franchise owned by Nintendo and created by Satoshi Tajiri. She has appeared as a Gym Leader in the Pokémon video games Pokémon Red and Blue, Pokémon Gold and Silver and their respective remakes. She was a main character in the ongoing anime for the first five seasons, travelling alongside Ash Ketchum and Brock / Tracey to become a Water-type Pokémon Master before departing home to Cerulean City to run the family gym. The character has also appeared in manga like Pokémon Adventures. She specialises in Water-type Pokémon. Her Japanese voice actress is Mayumi Iizuka, while her English voice was supplied by Rachael Lillis and Michele Knotz.

== Conception and design ==
Developed by Game Freak and published by Nintendo, the Pokémon series began in Japan in 1996 with the release of Pokémon Red and Blue for the Game Boy. In these games, the player assumes the role of a Pokémon Trainer whose goal is to capture and train creatures called Pokémon. Players use the creatures' special abilities to combat other Pokémon and some can transform into stronger species, or evolve. The ultimate goal is to complete the Pokédex, a comprehensive Pokémon encyclopedia, by capturing, evolving and trading to obtain creatures from all Pokémon species.

Designed by Ken Sugimori as a "gym leader", a Pokémon trainer that acts as an area boss, Misty was introduced in Red and Blue. Due to the nature of the game's development, only one set of concept sketches were done before implementing the character as sprite art within the game. Originally intended to be the game's third gym leader battle, she was changed to be the second instead for the game's final release. Designed as a young woman with red hair tied into a side ponytail, Sugimori often depicted her in a two-piece swimsuit to fit thematically with her gym and its swimming pools.

For her anime appearance, she was designed by Atsuko Nishida. Her outfit was changed significantly for this appearance, giving her sneakers, a yellow shirt that reached above her midriff and blue shorts held up by red suspenders around her torso. Emphasis was placed on the shape of her eyes in the animation guides and how to draw them. Her Japanese voice actress, Mayumi Iizuka, stated that during her audition the director asked her to act like herself and in doing so she landed the role. As a result, she considers Misty to be the one character she has voiced who most represents herself. Iizuka keeps track of her character's promotional appearances in merchandise and other material, additionally providing fans with insights on possible future cameos in the anime series.

In January 1999, Game Freak explained the origin of the English name of Misty: "The English word for 'Kasumi' is 'Mist,' so the name was changed to -ty to make it sound more feminine."

== Appearances ==
=== In the video games ===
In the video games Pokémon Red, Blue, Yellow, FireRed & LeafGreen, Pokémon Gold, Silver, Crystal, Pokémon HeartGold and SoulSilver and Pokémon: Let's Go, Pikachu! and Let's Go, Eevee!, Misty is the Gym Leader of Cerulean City. She specializes in Water-type Pokémon. Misty, in her anime form, also appears as a trophy in Super Smash Bros. Melee and as a gym leader in Pokémon Puzzle League. Additionally, she appears on Pokémon Channel on a full Japanese Pichu Bros. Disc. The disc differs from the other Japanese disc, as Misty's (Kasumi) voice actor is the narrator. Misty, as well as most of the gym leaders in Pokémon history, reappear in Pokémon Black 2 and White 2 as part of the Pokémon World Tournament.

=== In the anime ===
In the anime, Misty travels with Ash Ketchum on his journey through the Pokémon world. She is a stubborn tomboy who trains Water Pokémon and has three older sisters, Daisy, Violet and Lily. She left the Gym to her three older sisters prior to traveling with Ash in the anime, although she still retained the title of Gym Leader despite this. She first comes across Ash when she accidentally fishes him and his Pikachu out of a river while fishing for water Pokémon. Soon after this incident, Ash "borrows" her bike in an attempt to flee from a flock of wild Spearow. The bike is later charred by an attack from Pikachu. Misty tells Ash she will not leave him alone until he replaces the bike and commits to follow him on his journey and the two soon become best friends. After retrieving her repaired bike at the end of the Johto League Silver Conference, she returns to the Cerulean Gym and resumes her duties as the Gym Leader.

Misty becomes a central character in Pokémon Chronicles, a spin-off to the Pokémon anime and appears in several specials and episodes. She maintains her friendship with Ash and eventually goes to Hoenn to meet up with him, meeting May and Max and sees him again when he returns to Pallet following a long stint in Hoenn. She also appeared in a few episodes of Sun & Moon series alongside Brock where she met Ash and his Alolan friends. Misty made more appearances in Pokémon Ultimate Journeys: The Series as Ash's journey with the show came to end.

In the early episodes, Misty is depicted as having a short temper, stubborn temperament and little patience. As the series progresses, however, she mellows out and gradually shows herself to be kind and sensible. Misty becomes the trainer of Togepi, caring for it throughout the series. Misty constantly reins in Brock when he becomes enamored with pretty girls, often pulling him away by the ear. She also has the insectophobia of most Bug-type Pokémon. Misty aims to be a Water-type Pokémon Master despite her older sisters' ridicule.

=== In the manga ===
The Misty character that appears in the Electric Tale of Pikachu manga series, which is loosely based on the anime, is similar to the Misty in the anime, while the Misty in Pokémon Adventures is similar to the Misty in the video games. She appears throughout Electric Tale of Pikachu, traveling on occasion with Ash. In Pokémon Adventures, When Red, the protagonist of the manga, first meets her, she is trying to recapture her Gyarados with help of her Staryu, which has been brainwashed by Team Rocket. They decide to team up and confront Team Rocket. The next morning, after spending the night resting in Misty's mansion, Misty leads Red to her Gym and reveals herself to be the Gym Leader. They have a battle and though Misty quickly gained the upper hand and easily defeated Red with her fast and strong Starmie, she is worried that if they do not prepare themselves, Team Rocket will defeat them easily. Red decides that he might actually need training and agrees to train. At that point, they become close friends.

In Pokémon Pocket Monsters, Red, the protagonist of the series, is seeking a Moon Stone along with his Pikachu and his Clefairy (one that speaks human language). When they meet Misty, Clefairy notices that she is wearing a Moon Stone as a necklace. Misty declares that they battle her if they wish to have it. While the Clefairy is initially pumped up to battle, he quickly changes his mind when he sees that his opponent is a massive Blastoise. After a while, the battle is won when Clefairy sucks up all the water in a nearby river and releases the water onto Misty's Pokémon, sending it flying into the sky. Just when Misty is about to reward Red's group with the prize they sought, the stone is stolen.

== Critical reception ==
The book The Japanification of Children's Popular Culture described Misty's portrayal in the anime as a mother figure, calling her a "nurturing component" for the original trio of herself, Ash and Brock. It further described her as an "unusually 'complete' girl of the anime world", noting both her feminine sentimentality and her "explosive rage". Anime Classics Zettai!: 100 Must-See Japanese Animation Masterpieces praised the character as being "particularly nuanced" and described her as contributing heavily to the series' appeal. Pikachu's Global Adventure: The Rise and Fall of Pokémon stated that though the anime focused on Ash, Misty was a distinctly significant character especially to young female consumers, neither "butch" nor "dizzily feminine", seemingly "carefully constructed to appeal to preadolescent girls". It added that, unlike other aggressive female characters in the series, Misty did not sacrifice her femininity to succeed, making the character further popular with young American women, a contrast to Japanese children who focused more on the individual Pokémon species to identify with.

In studies on the reactions boys and girls had to the concept of Misty as a heroine in the series, girls accepted it and were eager to associate themselves with the character, while boys attempted to belittle her efforts. On the other hand, children of both genders felt the character alongside Brock gave Ash a sense of identity and moral support, which researchers attributed to the concept of group identity.

In 2013, nearing Halloween, Archie Comics illustrator Ryan Jampole utilized Misty as one of the 31 costumes for the character Roll from the Archie Comics adaptation of the Mega Man franchise.
