= Brock (Pokémon) =

Pokémon gym leader and character in the Pokémon franchise

- Pokémon character
- Brock in Pokémon the Series: Diamond and Pearl
- First game: Pokémon Red and Blue (1996)
- Created by: Ken Sugimori
- Designed by: Ken Sugimori; Atsuko Nishida (anime)
- Voiced by: English: Eric Stuart (anime, Season 1–8) Bill Rogers (anime, Season 9–25, Mewtwo Strikes Back: Evolution) Johnny Yong Bosch (Pokémon Origins) Tommy Arciniega (Pokémon Masters); Japanese: Yūji Ueda (anime) Tomokazu Sugita (Pokémon Origins) Kōsuke Toriumi (Pokémon Masters)
- Portrayed by: Dennis Kenney

Brock, known as Takeshi (タケシ) in Japan, is a fictional character in the Pokémon franchise owned by Nintendo, Game Freak, and Creatures. In the Pokémon video games, he is the Gym Leader of Pewter City in the Kanto region and mainly uses Rock-type Pokémon. In the anime series, Ash first battles him and then invites Brock to accompany him on his journey so that Brock can become a Pokémon Breeder. He exited the series at the start of Season Two, replaced by Tracey Sketchit, due to worries that people may find him to be a racial stereotype due to his thin eyes. However, when the company noticed that no one complained, they reintroduced him. He has generally been well-received, with fans of the anime happy whenever he is brought back into the series.

== Concept and creation ==
For the anime, not only was Brock established as 15, but he was given a wider range of expression. In addition, notes for the animation team detail how to handle his eyebrows, stating to not let the "chopsticks" touch.

Developed by Game Freak and published by Nintendo, the Pokémon series began in Japan in 1996 with the release of Pokémon Red and Blue for the Game Boy. In these games, the player assumes the role of a Pokémon Trainer whose goal is to capture and train creatures called Pokémon. Players use the creatures' special abilities to combat other Pokémon, and some can transform into stronger species, or evolve. The ultimate goal is to complete the Pokédex, a comprehensive Pokémon encyclopedia, by capturing, evolving, and trading to obtain creatures from all Pokémon species.

Designed by Ken Sugimori as a "gym leader", a Pokémon trainer that acts as an area boss, Brock was introduced in Red and Blue. Due to the nature of the game's development, only one set of concept sketches was done before implementing the character as sprite art within the game. Originally intended to be the game's second gym leader battle, Brock was changed to be the first instead for the game's final release. To illustrate that Brock rarely smiles, Sugimori drew him with his eyes always closed, something he considered a rare decision.

For the anime, Brock was designed by Atsuko Nishida. In the anime, Brock was one of the companions to protagonist Ash Ketchum. However, he was eventually replaced with the character Tracey Sketchit. His removal was controversial, leading to fan outcry that caused him to be reintroduced to the anime. Despite them noting that they like to change up the cast in general, it was also clarified that they were worried that fans may perceive Brock as a racist stereotype by Americans, namely due to his thin eyes. This was a worry they had since the beginning of the series, and while there were no complaints, they anticipated controversy. Furthermore, the company specifically included Tracey, wanting to include a "tall, Anglo-Saxon looking person to be on the safe side." They ultimately decided to introduce Brock again due to the lack of complaints and their personal affinity for him. He has since been one of the most recurring characters in the show.

Brock was voiced in Japanese by Yūji Ueda in the Pokemon anime and by Eric Stuart in English. He has been voiced by other actors in later Pokemon anime and games. Bill Rogers voiced Brock in later English episodes. In Pokemon Origins, he was voiced by Tomokazu Sugita in Japanese and Johnny Yong Bosch in English. In the video game Pokémon Masters, he is voiced by Kōsuke Toriumi in Japanese and by Tommy Arciniega. He was also portrayed by Dennis Kenney in Pokemon Live!.

== Appearances ==
=== In the video games ===
Brock is the Gym Leader of Pewter City in the fictional region of Kanto. He specializes in Rock-type Pokémon, and the player may battle him in Pokémon Red and Blue, Gold and Silver, as well as subsequent remakes of both. He also appears as an opponent in Pokémon Stadium and Pokémon Stadium 2. Brock, along with Misty and Blue, return in Pokémon Black 2 and White 2 as tournament opponents. Alongside his Onix, Brock also appears as a sync pair in Pokémon Masters EX near the beginning of the game.

=== In the anime ===
In the Pokémon anime, Brock aspires to be the greatest Pokémon Breeder in the world, but remains as the Pewter City Gym Leader to take care of his nine siblings. After he is defeated by Ash, he gives Ash the badge, despite Ash thinking he didn't deserve it. Brock ultimately joins Ash so that he can pursue his dream of being a Pokémon Breeder. He eventually leaves his friends in the Orange Islands series to join Professor Felina Ivy, who he is attracted to, and was replaced by Tracey Sketchit. Brock eventually rejoins Ash, having left Ivy for unknown reasons, and travels with him and Misty to Johto. Since then, he has departed and reunited with Ash and others in Hoenn and Sinnoh. He is largely absent after this until the Sun & Moon series, where he appears in a few episodes alongside Misty when he reunites with Ash. He makes another reappearance in Pokémon Ultimate Journeys: The Series during the final episodes of Ash's journey.

== Promotion and reception ==
Brock has received multiple pieces of merchandise. A figure based on his depiction in Pokémon Red and Blue was released as part of the "Next VENDOR'S Innovation" series. He was also included as part of Megahouse's "G.E.M." series of figures. A yearly tradition of modifying the statue of a man named Hikoichi Orita (at Kyoto University after it was repeatedly vandalized in the 1990s) lead to a modification being made to depict Brock, among other characters, instead. He was chosen as part of a trend, where the focus became featuring supporting characters from popular works.

Brock has been generally well-received, identified as an "unforgettable" character by IGN. The book The Japanification of Children's Popular Culture described Brock's portrayal in the anime as a mentor figure, providing an authoritative voice for Ash in the series. It additionally noted him as representing the concept of early maturity in Japanese stories, in his acceptance of a position of independence and his strong interest in women. The book Pikachu's Global Adventure: The Rise and Fall of Pokémon cited him as a heavily popular character in the United States, with boys identifying themselves with the character and expressing a desire to be "friends with characters that are known to be good or considerate friends". The book additionally noted a contrast to other characters in the series, in that Brock is drawn with "thinly drawn eyes and slightly darker skin tone". Game Informer writer Brian Shea felt he served as a "litmus test" to measure a trainer's ability early on, while Kotaku writer felt he was a difficult battle for people who picked Charmander in Red and Blue, and also people who played Pokémon Yellow, due to Pikachu's weakness to his Pokémon.

His removal from the anime was criticized by fans. Brock's reintroduction in the Pokémon Sun and Moon anime was met with a lot of attention on Twitter, which ITmedia staff identified as indicative of his popularity. Kotaku writer Brian Ashcraft noted the negative fan reaction to the removal of Brock and Misty from Pokémon the Movie: I Choose You!, particularly since the story is an adaptation of the original story that featured Brock and Misty. The removal of Brock, whose skin is darker, also had fans concerned for the lack of skin color diversity. Fellow Kotaku writer Kenneth Shepard wrote that, despite Ash having other companions, ending the series by reuniting Ash with his original companions Brock and Misty was fitting. Brock also served as an inspiration for baby names, leading to a rise in the use of the name Brock.
