= Team Rocket =

Fictional crime organization in the Pokémon series

- Pokémon organization
- Logo
- First appearance: Pokémon Red and Green (1996)
- Created by: Ken Sugimori
- Genre: Role-playing video game

In-universe information
- Type: Criminal syndicate

Team Rocket (Japanese: ロケット団, Hepburn: Roketto-dan; Japanese: [ɾo̞ke̞t̚to̞ dã̠ɴ]) is a fictional crime syndicate in the Pokémon franchise. Team Rocket is the primary antagonist in the original Pokémon video games Red, Green, and Blue, as well as in the long-running Pokémon anime TV-series. In the latter, Team Rocket is primarily represented through the trio of characters Jessie, James, and Meowth, who are major secondary characters throughout the Pokémon TV-series.

Team Rocket is portrayed as a serious crime syndicate in the video games series. In the TV-series, Team Rocket has a largely comedic role, as the trio of grunts repeatedly fail to steal Pokémon while operating increasingly flashy mecha. The Team Rocket trio in the anime are popular among fans who relate to their roles as young adults.

== In video games ==
Team Rocket first appeared in the video games Pokémon Red, Green, and Blue, where they are portrayed as a serious and affluent crime syndicate aiming to capture and steal Pokémon for profit. The games present Team Rocket breaking and entering, murdering a mother Marowak, and chopping off the tails of Slowpoke to sell on the black market. In Pokémon Gold, Silver, and Crystal, it is revealed that Team Rocket's leader Giovanni had disappeared after being defeated in the original games, and the syndicate is disbanded. Giovanni himself reappears in the 2009 remakes Pokémon HeartGold and SoulSilver.

Each subsequent set of Pokémon video games has its own villainous teams, such as Team Aqua and Team Magma in Pokémon Ruby and Sapphire, and Team Galactic in Pokémon Diamond and Pearl. Team Rocket and Giovanni returned as a major antagonist team in the 2017 video games Pokémon Ultra Sun and Ultra Moon, as "Team Rainbow Rocket."

Team Rocket was introduced to Pokémon Go under the name of "Team GO Rocket" in 2019, allowing players to encounter and battle Team Rocket grunts, its leaders Sierra, Arlo and Cliff, and Giovanni himself. Team Rocket grunts also appear in Super Smash Bros. Ultimate as DLC costumes for Mii Fighters.

== In the anime ==
Jessie, James, and Meowth
- Pokémon characters
- James, Meowth, and Jessie, as they appear in the early seasons of the Pokémon TV series
- First appearance: "Pokémon Emergency!" (1997)
- Last appearance: "The Rainbow and the Pokémon Master!" (2023)
- Designed by: Sayuri Ichishi
- Portrayed by: Jessie; Lauren Kling (Pokémon Live!); James; Andrew Rannells (Pokémon Live!)
- Voiced by: Japanese: Jessie; Megumi Hayashibara; James; Shin-ichiro Miki; Meowth; Inuko Inuyama; English: Jessie; Rachael Lillis (Seasons 1–8); Michele Knotz (Seasons 9–25); James; Ted Lewis (Season 1) (Note: Episodes 2–8); Eric Stuart (Seasons 1–8); James Carter Cathcart (Seasons 9–25); Meowth; Matthew Sussman (Season 1) (Note: Episodes 2–31); Maddie Blaustein (Seasons 1–8); James Carter Cathcart (Seasons 9–25)

In the long-running Pokémon anime series, a trio of Team Rocket grunts Jessie (ムサシ, Musashi), James (コジロウ, Kojirō), and Meowth (ニャース, Nyarth) are major secondary characters. The three were the primary antagonists of the anime series, where each episode they attempt to kidnap Ash Ketchum's Pikachu.

In the earliest produced episodes of the anime, the trio was halfway intelligent and at times were very formidable foes; while they have assumed a more sinister role in various parts of the series, most notably in the Black and White anime, the three mainly act as comic relief. The characters are presented as simple-minded, bringing slapstick antics to the series. Team Rocket's Meowth – a common species of Pokémon – is unusual within the Pokémon canon, as he is the only Pokémon creature able to speak the human language, whereas all other Pokémon in the series only utter syllables of their own names.

Jessie and James originally had an Ekans and a Koffing as their signature Pokémon, respectively, and the trio were later joined by a Wobbuffet as one of their only major recurring Pokémon as the series progressed. As the Pokémon series evolved, the Team Rocket trio uses an increasingly large number of vehicles and mecha. Most notably, they travel in a Meowth-shaped hot air balloon throughout the show, and use a Gyarados-shaped submarine in its early seasons. Later on, Team Rocket became known for their large number of mecha and gadgets.

The Team Rocket characters have sympathetic backstories and share a strong camaraderie. They are not ideologically aligned with Giovanni and therefore frequently find themselves siding with the series' protagonists. Due to how frequently Jessie and James are shown to crossdress across the series, they are commonly read as queercoded.

In 2011, the Pokémon series was building up to an arc in which Giovanni faces off against rival organization Team Plasma, but the episodes were cancelled following the Great East Japan Earthquake. Team Rocket departed the series at the end of the Pokémon Ultimate Journeys anime. The team also appears in Pokémon Origins and Pokémon Generations, in portrayals more closely aligned with their in-game counterparts.

=== Development ===
The names Jessie and James reference famous American outlaw Jesse James; their Japanese names Musashi and Kojirō refer to the samurai Miyamoto Musashi and Sasaki Kojiro.

In the English dubbed anime, Jessie was initially voiced by Rachael Lillis, until the dub switched production from 4Kids Entertainment to The Pokémon Company International in 2006, when she was replaced by Michele Knotz. During her audition, Lillis was instructed to make Jessie "sultry" while also keeping her "tough." Lillis did not expect Jessie to be a recurring character in the series. James was originally voiced by Eric Stuart. The two actors quickly started to play around with their voices, giving the characters a "prissy" attitude that contrasted with their inability to succeed.

Meowth was voiced by Maddie Blaustein for seasons one to eight of the series until her death in 2008. James Carter Cathcart took over the roles of James and Meowth in 2006, and continued to voice the characters until 2023, when he retired from Pokémon due to oral cancer.

== Other media ==
Team Rocket appear as the main antagonists in several arcs of the Pokémon Adventures manga, including the Red, Green, and Blue, Yellow, and Gold and Silver arcs. The Team Rocket trio from the anime appear in the 1999 manga adaptation Electric Tale of Pikachu, which was loosely inspired by some episodes of the Indigo League. Jessie and James are shown at the end to be married and expecting a child.

Team Rocket is the central antagonist in the 2000 stageplay Pokémon Live!, in which Jessie, James, and Meowth successfully steal Ash Ketchum's Pikachu and use it to train Giovanni's Mewtwo. Team Rocket characters additionally frequently appear on cards in the Pokémon Trading Card Game, most notably in the Team Rocket expansion released in 2000.

== Reception and legacy ==
James' tendency to crossdress in earlier episodes of the anime has led to the duo being read as queercoded. The scene depicted where he utilizes inflatable breasts resulted in the episode being removed from circulation for western audiences.

As comic relief characters, Jessie, James, and Meowth are very popular among Pokémon viewers, having been cited as some of the best villains in the franchise. Yahoo!-writer Jay Castello notes that as Pokémon fans grew up, the struggle of "twenty-somethings who couldn't quite find their place in the world or succeed at their ambitions" became increasingly relatable, and a sub-fandom dedicated to the trio sprang up. The LGBT community largely embraced Team Rocket's queercoding, interpreting them as bisexual drag artists. Blaustein was inspired by Meowth-focused episode "Go West, Young Meowth" to come out and transition as a transgender woman, a friend of her later metaphorically describing the character as "a human trapped in a Pokémon's body."

Their moral ambiguity and complex relationship with the main cast have been highlighted as core elements of the television series, as their occasional positive actions, which sometimes even assist Ash Ketchum and his friends, contrast with their antagonistic role. The Fandom Post named Jessie and James as the "Best Villain Couple" due to their continuous hard work as well as interactions over several episodes. The book Japanese Influence on American's Children's Television: Transforming Saturday Morning praised Jessie in particular for being a strong female character, acting as James's superior, as well as how she did not fall into a stereotypical female role. Meowth's role on the team has also been met with a positive response, being considered an integral and iconic part of the team. He has been highlighted as a key part of why his species was so well-known. Chris Carter of Destructoid called the English voice team for Jessie, James, and Meowth (Lillis, Stuart, and Blaustein) "some of the show's finest work." Their role in Pokémon the Series: Black & White was cited by Polygon to be one of the biggest missed opportunities with their characters, due to the sudden cancellation of several episodes leading to Team Rocket's character changes in the series being for "nothing."

Team Rocket has been referenced in music by various rappers, with American rapper Lil Uzi Vert naming a song on his 2016 mixtape, Lil Uzi Vert vs. the World, after the group.
