= Pokémon Heroes =

2002 Japanese animated film by Kunihiko Yuyama

- Theatrical release poster

Japanese name
- Kanji: 劇場版ポケットモンスター 水の都の護神 ラティアスとラティオス
- Literal meaning: Pocket Monsters the Movie: Guardians of the Water City Latias and Latios
Transcriptions
- Revised Hepburn: Gekijō-ban Pokettomonsutā Mizu no Miyako no Mamorigami Ratiasu to Ratiosu
- Directed by: Kunihiko Yuyama
- Screenplay by: Hideki Sonoda
- Based on: Pokémon: Master Quest by Satoshi Tajiri, & Nintendo
- Produced by: Choji Yoshikawa; Yukako Matsusako; Takemoto Mori
- Starring: Rica Matsumoto; Ikue Ōtani; Mayumi Iizuka; Yūji Ueda; Satomi Kōrogi; Megumi Hayashibara; Shin-ichiro Miki; Inuko Inuyama; Kōichi Yamadera; Unshō Ishizuka; Taichirō Hirokawa; Uno Kanda; Yumiko Shaku; Yuzo Gutch; Yūka
- Cinematography: Hisao Shirai
- Edited by: Toshio Henmi
- Music by: Shinji Miyazaki; coba
- Production company: OLM, Inc.
- Distributed by: Toho
- Release date: July 13, 2002 (Japan)
- Running time: 72 minutes
- Country: Japan
- Language: Japanese
- Box office: $27.7 million

Pokémon Heroes (Note: Originally released in Japan as Pocket Monsters the Movie: Guardians of the Water City Latias and Latios (劇場版ポケットモンスター 水の都の護神 ラティアスとラティオス, Gekijō-ban Pokettomonsutā Mizu no Miyako no Mamorigami Ratiasu to Ratiosu)) (also known as Pokémon Heroes: The Movie) is a 2002 Japanese animated film directed by Kunihiko Yuyama and written by Hideki Sonoda. Produced by OLM, Inc. and distributed by Toho, it is the fifth film in the Pokémon series. The film stars Rica Matsumoto, Ikue Ōtani, Mayumi Iizuka, Yūji Ueda, Satomi Kōrogi, Megumi Hayashibara, Shin-ichiro Miki, Inuko Inuyama, Kōichi Yamadera, Unshō Ishizuka, Taichirō Hirokawa, Uno Kanda, Yumiko Shaku, Yuzo Gutch, and Yūka. In Pokémon Heroes, Ash Ketchum, Misty and Brock travel to the city of Alto Mare and face off against the mysterious spies Annie and Oakley, who seek to use the guardian Pokémon Latias and Latios to power a superweapon. The film takes place during the fifth season of the Pokémon anime.

Alto Mare, the main setting of the film, is based on the real-world city of Venice, Italy, with Yuyama choosing the location as a basis in order to communicate the feeling of entering a mysterious world. The film's title was revealed on January 30, 2002, in Japan. The film debuted alongside a short episode, titled "Camp Pikachu". The film's English adaptation was produced by 4Kids Entertainment and distributed by Miramax Films.

The film premiered in Japan on July 13, 2002. An English adaptation produced by 4Kids Entertainment was distributed in the United States by Miramax Films on May 16, 2003. This version stars the regular television cast of Veronica Taylor, Eric Stuart, Rachael Lillis and Maddie Blaustein. The film grossed US$27 million in Japan and $756,381 in the United States, becoming the lowest-grossing film in the Pokémon franchise. The film was met with generally negative reviews, though retrospective reviews have been more positive.

== Plot ==
The city of Alto Mare is protected by the dragon siblings Latias and Latios. Their father, also a Latios, once saved the city from an evil Pokémon Trainer and their Pokémon, transforming its streets into canals. The father Latios died protecting the city, leaving behind the Soul Dew containing his own soul. The citizens built the Defense Mechanism of Alto Mare (D.M.A.) to protect the city if necessary, using the Soul Dew as a power source, which was hidden away to prevent its usage.

In the present, Ash Ketchum and his friends, Misty and Brock, tour the city. During a local water race, Ash and Misty briefly see an invisible Latias. Two spies named Annie and Oakley attempt to capture Latias, disguised as a human girl named Bianca, so they can gain access to the defense mechanism. Ash and Pikachu guide Latias to safety, but she disappears soon after.

At a local museum, the trio learn from its curator and Bianca's grandfather Lorenzo about Alto Mare's history, the defense mechanism, and the evil trainer's fossilized Pokémon on display. Ash finds Bianca and chases her across the city into a hidden garden where Latias and Latios live. As Pikachu plays with the Pokémon, Lorenzo shows Ash the Soul Dew, unaware that Annie and Oakley have used an unmanned aerial vehicle to infiltrate the sanctuary.

That evening, Annie and Oakley capture Latios and the Soul Dew to power the D.M.A., but Latias escapes and seeks Ash's help. Using the defense mechanism, Oakley locks down the city and revives the evil trainer's Pokémon from the dead. After escaping the lockdown, Ash, Pikachu and Latias travel to the museum to rescue Latios and disable the defense mechanism in the ensuing fight. The Soul Dew shatters from its use in the device, causing the city's water to become a tidal wave. Latias and Latios combine their powers to stop the wave, but Latios dies in the process and transforms into a new Soul Dew.

Later, Ash and his friends are about to depart Alto Mare when a mysterious girl resembling Bianca arrives to see them off. She gives Ash a sketch of him and Pikachu, and kisses him before she silently leaves. Ash, Misty and Brock leave the city for their next adventure, while Annie and Oakley are detained and jailed.

== Voice cast ==
Character	Japanese voice	English voice
Ash Ketchum	Rica Matsumoto	Veronica Taylor
Misty	Mayumi Iizuka	Rachael Lillis
Brock	Yūji Ueda	Eric Stuart
Pikachu	Ikue Ōtani	Ikue Ōtani
Togepi	Satomi Kōrogi	Satomi Kōrogi
Latias	Megumi Hayashibara	Megumi Hayashibara
Latios	Masashi Ebara	Megumi Hayashibara
Jessie	Megumi Hayashibara	Rachael Lillis
James	Shin-ichiro Miki	Eric Stuart
Meowth	Inuko Inuyama	Maddie Blaustein
Wobbuffet	Yuji Ueda	Kayzie Rogers
Zanner (ザンナー, Zannā)	Uno Kanda	Annie
Zanner (ザンナー, Zannā)	Uno Kanda	Megan Hollingshead
Rion (リオン)	Yumiko Shaku	Oakley
Rion (リオン)	Yumiko Shaku	Lisa Ortiz
Rossi (ロッシ, Rosshi)	Kōichi Yamadera	Ross
Rossi (ロッシ, Rosshi)	Kōichi Yamadera	Michael Sinterniklaas
Vongole (ボンゴレ, Bongore)	Yuzo Gutch	Lorenzo
Vongole (ボンゴレ, Bongore)	Yuzo Gutch	Wayne Grayson
Kanon (カノン)	Fumiko Orikasa	Bianca
Kanon (カノン)	Fumiko Orikasa	Tara Sands
Narrator	Unshō Ishizuka	Rodger Parsons

== Production ==
During a production presentation held at a hotel January 30, 2002, in Japan, the film's title was officially announced alongside the announcement of video game Pokémon Ruby and Sapphire's release date. Several members of the film's Japanese voice cast were revealed at the presentation, with the cast members explaining their roles in the film. The presentation was stated to go on a "road show" following this initial reveal at the hotel.

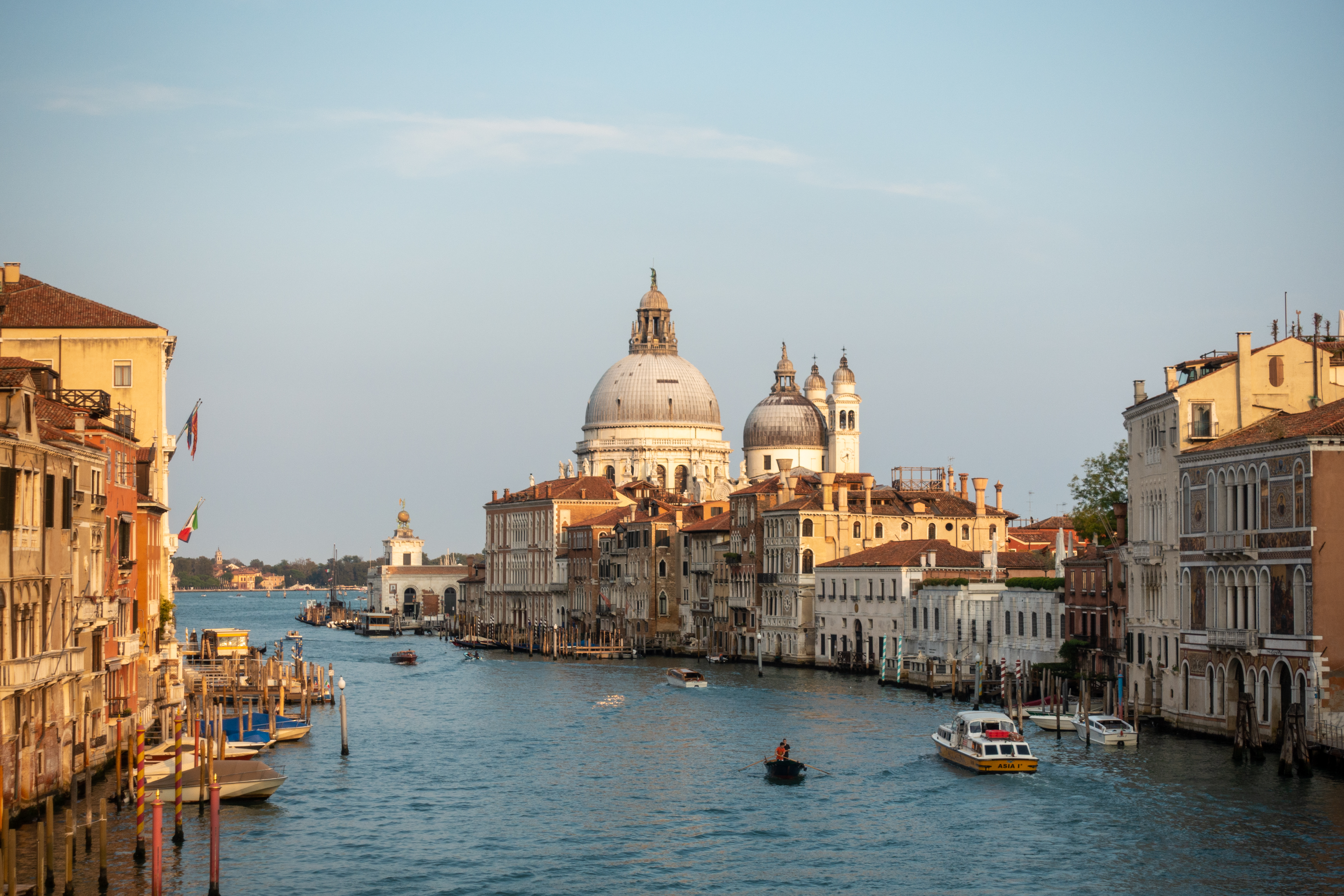
Venice was a major inspiration for the film's main setting of Alto Mare.

The city of Alto Mare, the film's main location, is based around the city of Venice, Italy, and many Italian words are used in the film's dialogue as a result. The film's director, Kunihiko Yuyama, chose Venice as an inspiration for the film to convey the feeling of entering a mysterious world. Yuyama scouted out locations in Venice to use as inspiration for various locations in Alto Mare.

Pokémon Heroes is the fifth film in the Pokémon film franchise, following the release of the 2001 film Pokémon 4Ever and a pattern of a yearly release schedule. Though the films maintained a degree of popularity, by the time of its predecessor's release, the hype surrounding the Pokémon franchise was beginning to die down, resulting in 4Ever doing poorly at the box office. While Miramax continued to distribute the film series following 4Ever, Heroes received an even more limited theatrical release than prior films in the series did.

The film was aired alongside the short episode "Camp Pikachu", which introduced the Pokémon Wynaut to the franchise. Yuka narrated the short episode. A prologue at the beginning of the film, which describes the history of Alto Mare and its guardians, was cut in the film's international releases.

== Box office and release ==
The first three Pokémon films, Pokémon: The First Movie, Pokémon: The Movie 2000, and Pokémon 3: The Movie, were released outside of Japan by Warner Bros., but the distribution rights for Pokémon 4Ever and Pokémon Heroes were given to Miramax on April 2, 2002, by The Pokémon Company. Miramax was rumored to have bought the rights for $1 million and by giving up 75% of the profits. Harvey Weinstein stated that Miramax could "reinvigorate the franchise".

The film opened on July 13, 2002, at the same time as Star Wars: Episode II – Attack of the Clones in Japan (where it had opened at number one), and failed to out-gross it. It later fell to ninth place at the Japanese box office behind Star Wars: Episode II – Attack of the Clones and Stuart Little 2. The film grossed US$27 million in Japan. In North America, the film had a limited run in theaters, only opening in 196 theaters. The film was released in theaters on May 16, 2003, and grossed $756,381, resulting in the film becoming the lowest grossing in the series. Heroes would be the last film in the series to receive a major theatrical release until the 2017 film Pokémon the Movie: I Choose You!.

The film was re-released in theaters in Japan from August 11 to August 18, 2022, in order to celebrate the 25th Anniversary Pokémon Film Festival.

== Reception ==
=== Contemporaneous ===
Pokémon Heroes received generally negative reviews from critics. On the review aggregator website Rotten Tomatoes, 19% of 42 critics' reviews are positive, with an average rating of 3.9/10. The website's consensus reads: "This series isn't getting any better." Metacritic, which uses a weighted average, assigned the film a score of 27 out of 100, based on 17 critics, indicating "generally unfavorable" reviews. Desson Howe of The Washington Post stated that "This one's for kids and no one else", with The Austin Chronicle's Marc Savlov also giving the film a negative review. Robert Koehler, writing for Variety, highlighted the fun atmosphere and visuals of the film, as well as its music, but criticized how these aspects faltered after Annie and Oakley's plot-line commences. He additionally criticized the visual designs and sound effects of Latias and Latios and the rendering of 3-D models found in the film. Dave Kehr of The New York Times highlighted the film's 3-D effects, but criticized the film's plot and characters, calling it "a tedious, unimaginative affair". Tasha Robinson of The A.V. Club found the film to be boring for both adults and children, stating that the film lacked substance for viewers.

=== Retrospective ===
Retrospective reviews have been more positive. Pedro Hernandez of Nintendo World Report stated that while the film's animation was not the greatest the series' films had, he found it to be a visually impressive film, additionally highlighting the design of the film's main location of Alto Mare. TheGamer's Eric Switzer found the film's plot to be confusing, though felt it was better executed than the series' prior film, Pokémon 4Ever. Though he disliked the sound effects used to verbally represent Latias and Latios's speech, he stated he "was still pleasantly surprised by how much personality and charm these otherwise forgettable Legendaries had," additionally highlighting Latios's death scene. Callum May of Anime News Network highlighted the film's "iconic" opening, additionally praising the relationship between Ash and Latias and the overall character work in the film. Witney Seibold, writing for /Film, highlighted the film's relaxing atmosphere, and stated that despite the film's waning popularity, it helped emphasize that the film franchise did not need exclusively action in order to function. The identity of who kissed Ash at the end of the film became a highly debated topic among fans of the series, with debate persisting long past the film's release.

== Legacy ==
The film's environment and characters were referenced in later Pokémon media. The anime season Pokémon Ultimate Journeys: The Series featured cameo appearances from Bianca and Alto Mare, marking one of the few times the franchise's films were referenced in the main anime series. In 2017, The Pokémon Company hosted a fan poll to celebrate the release of the 2017 film Pokémon the Movie: I Choose You! in order to determine fans' favorite film, with Heroes ranking in first place on the poll. As part of a celebration of the Pokémon anime's 25th anniversary, selected films were voted on by fans to be shown in theaters as part of the "25th Anniversary Pokémon Film Festival". The films that were selected in theaters were decided by a poll of 200,000 votes, with Heroes being among the three films selected. A serial code for a Pikachu based on Ash's was distributed. Players could redeem it in the games Pokémon Sword and Shield alongside showings of the film. A Latias was also distributed to celebrate the film's re-release. This Latias had a special attack named "Lovely Kiss", a reference to the film's ending.

== Home media ==
=== North America ===
In the United States, Miramax released the film on DVD and VHS on January 20, 2004. On March 3, 2015, Lionsgate released a 4-pack DVD set, which included the three other Pokémon films Miramax held the American rights to (Pokémon 4Ever, Pokémon: Jirachi, Wish Maker and Pokémon: Destiny Deoxys). A 2012 Blu-ray version of this release by Echo Bridge also exists. In 2020, Paramount Home Entertainment reissued the film on DVD. It was released digitally on Amazon Prime Video in 2022.

=== Germany ===
Earlier international home-video releases of Pokémon Heroes featured a noticeable blue tint that differed from the original Japanese color presentation. On November 28, 2025, German distributor Polyband released the film as part of a limited DVD and Blu-ray box set containing all 23 main Pokémon films. The release included both the original color presentation and the previously distributed blue-tinted version.

== See also ==
- List of films based on video games
