= Ojarumaru series 18 =

Ojarumaru
- Series 18

Release
- Original network: NHK
- Original release: April 1, 2015

Series chronology
- ← Previous; Series 17

The eighteenth series of the Ojarumaru anime series aired on NHK since April 1, 2015. This is the first series to air on Wednesday through Friday, instead of Monday through Friday.

The series' opening theme is "Utahito" (詠人) by Saburō Kitajima. The ending theme is "Wakaran" (わからん I Don't Know) by Zainichi Funk.

== Episodes ==
No.	Title	Original release date
1489	"My Pebble"	April 1, 2015
1490	"The Lost Properties"	April 2, 2015
1491	"Ojaru Watch"	April 3, 2015
1492	"There's Not Enough Peaches"	April 8, 2015
1493	"Oja Retsu"	April 9, 2015
1494	"Pudding Seed"	April 10, 2015
1495	"One Thousand Years of Love"	April 15, 2015
1496	"Kazuma Looks After the Scepter"	April 16, 2015
1497	"The Tiresome Duckling"	April 17, 2015
1498	"Pe"	April 22, 2015
1499	"The Old Men's Secret"	April 23, 2015
1500	"Where's the Scepter?"	April 24, 2015
1501	"Gagaga"	April 29, 2015
1502	"Marie's Party"	April 30, 2015
1503	"Kisuke Becomes an Adult"	May 1, 2015
1504	"Flightless Denbo"	May 6, 2015
1505	"N/A"	May 7, 2015
1506	"N/A"	May 8, 2015
1507	"N/A"	May 13, 2015
1508	"Puun"	May 14, 2015
1509	"Cold Tessai is Always Being Different"	May 15, 2015
1510	"The Lovely Obake-sama"	May 20, 2015
1511	"Kame Makes Cranes"	May 21, 2015
1512	"Reward Pudding"	May 22, 2015
1513	"Love and the Pebble"	May 27, 2015
1514	"Perfect Denbo"	May 28, 2015
1515	"Moroboshi Appears Once Again"	May 29, 2015
1516	"Pudding VS Ojaru"	June 3, 2015
1517	"Turtle's Yarn"	June 4, 2015
1518	"The Tamae Fortune-telling"	June 5, 2015
1519	"N/A"	June 10, 2015
1520	"Which Ball?"	June 11, 2015
1521	"N/A"	June 12, 2015
1522	"N/A"	October 7, 2015
1523	"N/A"	October 8, 2015
1524	"Dark Oni and the 13 Scary Circle of Friends"	October 9, 2015
1525	"The Tiny Flea Market"	October 14, 2015
1526	"Ojaru the Wolf Boy"	October 15, 2015
1527	"N/A"	October 16, 2015
1528	"Rainy Day Shiritori"	October 21, 2015
1529	"Enma: The Livelihood of Ai"	October 22, 2015
1530	"Ojarumaru's Secret"	October 23, 2015
1531	"N/A"	October 28, 2015
1532	"N/A"	October 29, 2015
1533	"Please Forgive Me"	October 30, 2015
1534	"N/A"	November 4, 2015
1535	"Okame to the Arranged Marriage"	November 5, 2015
1536	"Relaxing Early"	November 6, 2015
1537	"I'm Waiting for Your Yellow Handkerchief"	November 11, 2015
1538	"The Broken Byōbu"	November 12, 2015
1539	"The Tiny Sumo"	November 13, 2015
1540	"Stuck in the Moonlight Town Police Box"	November 18, 2015
1541	"Ojarumaru Doesn't Want to Be Sucked"	November 19, 2015
1542	"Cold Tessai Doesn't Understand"	November 20, 2015
1543	"Moonlight Town News"	November 25, 2015
1544	"I'm Everywhere"	November 26, 2015
1545	"Denbo Receives a Test"	November 27, 2015
1546	"N/A"	December 2, 2015
1547	"The Moonlight Flower"	December 3, 2015
1548	"I'm Weary"	December 4, 2015
1549	"Scepteer～"	December 9, 2015
1550	"Frozen Moonlight Pond"	December 10, 2015
1551	"N/A"	December 11, 2015
