= Ojarumaru series 17 =

Ojarumaru
- Series 17
- No. of episodes: 70

Release
- Original network: NHK
- Original release: April 1 – November 7, 2014

Series chronology
- ← Previous; Series 16 Next → Series 18

The seventeenth series of the Ojarumaru anime series aired from April 1 to November 7, 2014, on NHK for a total of 70 episodes. The series was originally scheduled to premier on March 31, 2014, but got pushed back to April 1 due to NHK airing the National High School Baseball Championship in the series' time slot on that day.

The series' opening theme is "Utahito" (詠人) by Saburō Kitajima. The ending theme is "Da!Da!!Da!!" by The Collectors. Episodes 1454 through 1458, and 1479 through 1483 were released on DVD by Nippon Columbia across two compilation DVDs (that also includes selected episodes from Series 13 through 16) simultaneously on November 19, 2014.

== Episodes ==
No.	Title	Original release date
1419	"Kazuma Laid-back"	April 1, 2014
1420	"Under One Roof"	April 2, 2014
1421	"N/A"	April 3, 2014
1422	"Ojarumaru Wants a Return Gift"	April 4, 2014
1423	"N/A"	May 19, 2014
1424	"N/A"	April 7, 2014
1425	"Aobee Can't Think of a Strategy"	April 8, 2014
1426	"Puddings, Puddings, Puddings,"	April 9, 2014
1427	"Ojarumaru Became an Oni Child"	April 10, 2014
1428	"Makoto's Miso Soup"	April 11, 2014
1429	"The Oni Child Grasps"	April 14, 2014
1430	"Oko-Niko Makes a Club"	April 15, 2014
1431	"Dance, Old Men"	April 16, 2014
1432	"Dating"	April 17, 2014
1433	"N/A"	April 18, 2014
1434	"Turtle and Crane"	April 21, 2014
1435	"Black and White Cold Tessai"	April 22, 2014
1436	"The Oni Child Recruiting a Maid"	April 23, 2014
1437	"Tanaka Sells a Handle"	April 24, 2014
1438	"The Flea Market"	April 25, 2014
1439	"Ojaru Builds a Strategy"	April 28, 2014
1440	"Viva, Bite"	April 29, 2014
1441	"Denbo Can't Fly"	April 30, 2014
1442	"N/A"	May 1, 2014
1443	"Bath Mask Appears"	May 2, 2014
1444	"N/A"	May 5, 2014
1445	"Kame-Tome Fly in the Sky"	May 6, 2014
1446	"Kobayashi Tea's Love Poem"	May 7, 2014
1447	"Hifumi Marriage?"	May 8, 2014
1448	"Poverty Poverty-chan"	May 9, 2014
1449	"N/A"	May 12, 2014
1450	"Viva, Brilliant-Slowly"	May 13, 2014
1451	"N/A"	May 14, 2014
1452	"The Oni Child Album"	May 15, 2014
1453	"N/A"	May 16, 2014
1454	"The Great Adventure in the Laid-back Midsummer: Ojarumaru Disappeared Part 1"	July 21, 2014
1455	"The Great Adventure in the Laid-back Midsummer: Ojarumaru Disappeared Part 2"	July 22, 2014
1456	"The Great Adventure in the Laid-back Midsummer: Ojarumaru Disappeared Part 3"	July 23, 2014
1457	"The Great Adventure in the Laid-back Midsummer: Ojarumaru Disappeared Part 4"	July 24, 2014
1458	"The Great Adventure in the Laid-back Midsummer: Ojarumaru Disappeared Part 5"	July 25, 2014
1459	"Cow and the Melons"	September 29, 2014
1460	"N/A"	September 30, 2014
1461	"Rhythm Gradually"	October 1, 2014
1462	"Ojack and the Pudding Stalk"	October 2, 2014
1463	"Romantic Sachiyo"	October 3, 2014
1464	"N/A"	October 6, 2014
1465	"N/A"	October 7, 2014
1466	"Tsukkii Dreams"	October 8, 2014
1467	"Akane Becomes a House"	October 9, 2014
1468	"Hoshino Goes to the Sentō"	October 10, 2014
1469	"Kazuma Likes Dogs?"	October 13, 2014
1470	"New"	October 14, 2014
1471	"N/A"	October 15, 2014
1472	"Tazan Makes a Masterpiece"	October 16, 2014
1473	"N/A"	October 17, 2014
1474	"Hoshino VS Tsukkii"	October 20, 2014
1475	"The Pebble Color Pencil"	October 21, 2014
1476	"Japanese Tea VS Coffee"	October 22, 2014
1477	"The Cap Sparkles Moonlight Town"	October 23, 2014
1478	"Onigiri Dance"	October 24, 2014
1479	"Chihayaburu"	October 27, 2014
1480	"The Tiny Hyakunin Isshu"	October 28, 2014
1481	"The Night of the Summer is..."	October 29, 2014
1482	"N/A"	October 30, 2014
1483	"Semimaron"	October 31, 2014
1484	"N/A"	November 3, 2014
1485	"Kazuma Can't Distinguish"	November 4, 2014
1486	"Mr. Ken Guides Maeda"	November 5, 2014
1487	"The Talkative Tools"	November 6, 2014
1488	"Tea's Classroom"	November 7, 2014
