= Ojarumaru series 16 =

Ojarumaru
- Series 16
- No. of episodes: 70

Release
- Original network: NHK
- Original release: April 1 – November 15, 2013

Series chronology
- Next → Series 17

The sixteenth series of the Ojarumaru anime series aired from April 1 to November 15, 2013, on NHK for a total of 70 episodes.

The series' opening theme is "Utahito" (詠人), with entirely new animation, by Saburō Kitajima. The ending theme is "Maro no Sanpo" (マロのさんぽ My Walk) by Yuriko Fuchizaki, Chinami Nishimura, and Narumi Satō.

== Episodes ==
No.	Title	Original release date
1349	Transliteration: "Ī Kao Shitai Ojarumaru" (Japanese: いい顔したいおじゃる丸)	April 1, 2013
1350	"Similar People Companion"; Transliteration: "Nitamono Dōshi" (Japanese: にたものどうし)	April 2, 2013
1351	Transliteration: "Shitte Shimatta Aobee" (Japanese: 知ってしまったアオベエ)	April 3, 2013
1352	Transliteration: "Denbo Kogi Makuru" (Japanese: 電ボ こぎまくる)	April 4, 2013
1353	"Okame the Lovable Shichihenge"; Transliteration: "Okame Nadeshiko Shichihenge" (Japanese: オカメなでしこ七変化)	April 5, 2013
1354	"My Wise Saying"; Transliteration: "Maro no Meigen" (Japanese: マロの名言)	April 8, 2013
1355	Transliteration: "Shaku Potto Naru" (Japanese: シャク ポッとなる)	April 9, 2013
1356	"The Various Photographs"; Transliteration: "Shashin Iroiro" (Japanese: 写真いろいろ)	April 10, 2013
1357	"Poverty-chan Quits the Tiny Club"; Transliteration: "Bin-chan Chicchai Mono Kurabu Yamerutteyo" (Japanese: 貧ちゃん ちっちゃいものクラブやめるってよ)	April 11, 2013
1358	"The Oni Child and the Schedule"; Transliteration: "Kooni to Yotei-hyō" (Japanese: 子鬼と予定表)	April 12, 2013
1359	"Cold Tessai's Chair"; Transliteration: "Rei Tessai no Isu" (Japanese: 冷徹斎のイス)	April 15, 2013
1360	"Akane Jūmonji"; Transliteration: "Jūmonji Akane" (Japanese: 十文字アカネ)	April 16, 2013
1361	Transliteration: "Na· a· ni?" (Japanese: な・あ・に？)	April 17, 2013
1362	Transliteration: "Kasakasa Butabuta" (Japanese: かさかさぶたぶた)	April 18, 2013
1363	"Who's... This Old Man?"; Transliteration: "Sono Ojisan··· Dare de Ojaru?" (Japanese: そのおじさん・・・だれでおじゃる？)	April 19, 2013
1364	"Okame and the Strength Inspiration of Love"; Transliteration: "Okame Ai no Chikara Kobu" (Japanese: オカメ 愛の力こぶ)	April 22, 2013
1365	"Father Comes"; Transliteration: "Chichiue Kuru" (Japanese: 父上 来る)	April 23, 2013
1366	"Usui Becomes a Flash Girl"; Transliteration: "Usui Furaggāru ni Naru" (Japanese: うすい フラッガールになる)	April 24, 2013
1367	Transliteration: "Kūru jano Okobou" (Japanese: クールじゃの オコ坊)	April 25, 2013
1368	Transliteration: "Tsuki Tsukimatō" (Japanese: 月つきまとう)	April 26, 2013
1369	"Aobee Becomes Ojaru's Fellow"; Transliteration: "Aobee Ojaru no Nakama ni Naru" (Japanese: アオベエ おじゃるの仲間になる)	April 29, 2013
1370	"Usui Designing"; Transliteration: "Usui Dezain Suru" (Japanese: うすい デザインする)	April 30, 2013
1371	"The Scepter's Dream"; Transliteration: "Shaku no Yume" (Japanese: シャクの夢)	May 1, 2013
1372	"Ojaru Draws a Rock"; Transliteration: "Ojaru Ishi o Egaku" (Japanese: おじゃる 石をえがく)	May 2, 2013
1373	Transliteration: "Ojaru Hayaku Oki Sugiru" (Japanese: おじゃる 早く起きすぎる)	May 3, 2013
1374	"Kin-chan's Blue Bird"; Transliteration: "Kin-chan no Aoi Tori" (Japanese: 金ちゃんの青い鳥)	May 6, 2013
1375	Transliteration: "Sono Kamen Dare jano?" (Japanese: その仮面 だれじゃの?)	May 7, 2013
1376	"Ojarumaru Plays the Cello"; Transliteration: "Sero o Hajiku Ojarumaru" (Japanese: セロを弾く おじゃる丸)	May 8, 2013
1377	Transliteration: "Modorenai Maiku" (Japanese: もどれないマイク)	May 9, 2013
1378	"Oja Merman"; Transliteration: "Oja Ningyo" (Japanese: おじゃ人魚)	May 10, 2013
1379	Transliteration: "Hanko Atsume wa Tsurai de Ojaru" (Japanese: ハンコあつめは辛いでおじゃる)	May 13, 2013
1380	"The Mangan Shrine Becomes Busy"; Transliteration: "Mangan Jinja Nigiyaka ni Naru" (Japanese: 満願神社 にぎやかになる)	May 14, 2013
1381	"Kin-chan No. 28 in the Cap"; Transliteration: "Eboshi no Naka no Kin-chan 28-Gō" (Japanese: エボシの中の金ちゃん28号)	May 15, 2013
1382	"Cold Tessai Becomes a Part-Timer"; Transliteration: "Rei Tessai Furītā ni Naru" (Japanese: 冷徹斎 フリーターになる)	May 16, 2013
1383	"Kazuma Pudding"; Transliteration: "Kazuma Purin" (Japanese: カズマプリン)	May 17, 2013
1384	Transliteration: "Usui Yome nai Hatsu" (Japanese: うすい よめないハッ)	May 20, 2013
1385	Transliteration: "Mayoi Neko Oja Ran" (Japanese: まよいねこ おじゃらん)	May 21, 2013
1386	"Tamae Strategy"; Transliteration: "Tamae Sakusen" (Japanese: たまえ作戦)	May 22, 2013
1387	"Either Sweet or Salty Watermelons"; Transliteration: "Suika Amai ka Shoppai ka" (Japanese: すいか あまいか しょっぱいか)	May 23, 2013
1388	"Continuing"; Transliteration: "Tsudzuku de Ojaru" (Japanese: つづくでおじゃる)	May 24, 2013
1389	"The Pudding is in There Now"; Transliteration: "Ima Soko ni aru Purin" (Japanese: 今そこにあるプリン)	October 7, 2013
1390	"Poverty-chan's Birthday"; Transliteration: "Bin-chan no Tanjōbi" (Japanese: 貧ちゃんの誕生日)	October 8, 2013
1391	Transliteration: "Kin Shidai" (Japanese: 金しだい)	October 9, 2013
1392	"The Shadow"; Transliteration: "Kage yo" (Japanese: かげよ)	October 10, 2013
1393	"Scoop vs Hoshino vs Moroboshi"; Transliteration: "Sukūpu tai Hoshino tai Moroboshi" (Japanese: スクープ対星野対諸星)	October 11, 2013
1394	Transliteration: "Denai de Ojaru" (Japanese: 出ないでおじゃる)	October 14, 2013
1395	Transliteration: "Ame Ame Fure Fure" (Japanese: あめあめふれふれ)	October 15, 2013
1396	"Enma is Well Liked"; Transliteration: "Enma Moteru" (Japanese: エンマ モテる)	October 16, 2013
1397	Transliteration: "Sono Saki ga Shiritai Ojarumaru" (Japanese: その先が知りたいおじゃる丸)	October 17, 2013
1398	"Ojaru Becomes a Cow"; Transliteration: "Ojaru Ushi ni Naru" (Japanese: おじゃる 牛になる)	October 18, 2013
1399	Transliteration: "Kicchiri Kacchiri Ī Tamae" (Japanese: キッチリカッチリ言いたまえ)	October 21, 2013
1400	"Mr. Kawakami Opens a Curry Shop"; Transliteration: "Kawakami-san Karē-ya Hajimeru" (Japanese: 川上さん カレー屋はじめる)	October 22, 2013
1401	"Nana"; Transliteration: "Nana" (Japanese: ナナ)	October 23, 2013
1402	"Warashi and the Hoshino Family"; Transliteration: "Warashi to Hoshino Ikka" (Japanese: ワラシと星野一家)	October 24, 2013
1403	"The Hard Pudding"; Transliteration: "Kachinkochin Purin" (Japanese: かちんこちんぷりん)	October 25, 2013
1404	Transliteration: "Furomae Romae" (Japanese: フロマエロマエ)	October 28, 2013
1405	"Attending the Enma Classroom"; Transliteration: "Enma Okyōshitsu ni Kayou" (Japanese: エンマ お教室に通う)	October 29, 2013
1406	"Father's Cap"; Transliteration: "Chichiue no Eboshi" (Japanese: 父上のエボシ)	October 30, 2013
1407	Transliteration: "Koibumi no Kimi" (Japanese: 恋文の君)	October 31, 2013
1408	"Aka Murasaki Shikibu Diary"; Transliteration: "Aka Murasaki Shikibu Nikki" (Japanese: 赤紫式部日記)	November 1, 2013
1409	Transliteration: "Bimyo" (Japanese: びみょー)	November 4, 2013
1410	"Usui's Fan"; Transliteration: "Usui no Fan" (Japanese: うすいのファン)	November 5, 2013
1411	"The Garbage and the Insect"; Transliteration: "Gomi to Mushikera" (Japanese: ゴミと虫けら)	November 6, 2013
1412	"The Naked Ojaru-sama"; Transliteration: "Hadaka no Ojaru-sama" (Japanese: 裸のおじゃる様)	November 7, 2013
1413	"Kisuke's Tusk"; Transliteration: "Kisuke no Kiba" (Japanese: キスケのきば)	November 8, 2013
1414	"Yoshiko Tanaka's Kamishibai"; Transliteration: "Tanaka Yoshiko no Kamishibai" (Japanese: タナカヨシコの紙芝居)	November 11, 2013
1415	"Getting Stuck Flying in the Sky"; Transliteration: "Soratobu Hamaru" (Japanese: 空飛ぶハマる)	November 12, 2013
1416	"Cocoa of the Night"; Transliteration: "Yoru no Kokoa" (Japanese: 夜のココア)	November 13, 2013
1417	"The Tiny Onsen Club"; Transliteration: "Chicchai Onsen Kurabu" (Japanese: ちっちゃい温泉クラブ)	November 14, 2013
1418	"The Moonlight Town Session"; Transliteration: "Gekkō Machi Sesshon" (Japanese: 月光町セッション)	November 15, 2013
