= Yūji Ueda =

Japanese actor, voice actor and singer (born 1967)

- うえだ ゆうじ
- Born: June 15, 1967 (age 59); Kitakyushu, Fukuoka Prefecture, Japan
- Other name: Yu-Chan
- Occupations: Actor; voice actor; singer
- Years active: 1992–present
- Agent: PomaRancz
- Spouse: Omi Minami

Yūji Ueda (うえだ ゆうじ, Ueda Yūji; born June 15, 1967) is a Japanese actor, voice actor and singer from Fukuoka Prefecture, Japan. He is best known for voicing the roles of Sagara Sanosuke in Rurouni Kenshin, Akito Tenkawa in Martian Successor Nadesico, Valerino in the 1992 series of Calimero, Takeshi/Brock and Sonansu/Wobbuffet in Pokémon, Horohoro in Shaman King, Johannes Krauser II in Detroit Metal City, Kōhei Oguri in Zipang, Keitarō Urashima in Love Hina, Shiro Iori in Kill la Kill, and Yousuke Fuuma in Wedding Peach.

== Biography ==
Yūji Ueda was born in Fukuoka as 上田祐司 (same pronunciation). In July 2004, he left Arts Vision and officially made his name into an all-hiragana form. In April 2005, Ueda joined Office Osawa.

Yūji is frequently called "Yū-chan" by veteran voice actresses; usually co-voice actresses from Pokémon.

He is married to voice actress Omi Minami. In March 2012, Ueda and Minami both left Osawa, and launched a new agency called PomaRancz.

== Filmography ==
=== Television animation ===
1992

- Calimero – Valerino

1994

- Blue Seed – Yoshiki Yaegashi
- Tokimeki Memorial – Yoshio Saotome

1995

- Bonobono – Yama-Ō
- Fushigi Yūgi – Amiboshi, Suboshi
- Wedding Peach – Yousuke Fuuma

1996

- The Vision of Escaflowne – Reeden
- Martian Successor Nadesico – Akito Tenkawa
- Rurouni Kenshin – Sagara Sanosuke
- Violinist of Hameln – Hamel
- Chouja Reideen - Masato Tsubaki

1997

- BØY – Kiyoshirō Okamoto
- Pokémon – Takeshi (Brock), Barri-chan (Mimey), Zippo
- Don't Leave Me Alone, Daisy – Kuma

1998

- Bakusō Kyōdai Let's & Go!! – Hitoshi Matsu
- Bubblegum Crisis Tokyo 2040 – Daly Wong
- Case Closed – Shigehisa Noguchi
- Di Gi Charat – Abarenbō
- Digimon Adventure – Numemon
- Eat-Man '98 – Larry
- Fancy Lala – Yoshio
- Flint the Time Detective – Dino Fishman
- Sexy Commando Gaiden: Sugoiyo! Masaru-san – Masaru Hananakajima
- Super Yo-Yo – Seito Houjouin
- Ojarumaru – Kisuke, Okorinbou

1999

- Black Heaven – Michael Sato
- Dai-Guard – Matsutouya
- Dr. Slump – Akira Toriyama
- Eden's Bowy – Spike Randit
- Pocket Monsters: Episode Orange Archipelago – Takeshi (Brock), Barri-chan (Mimey)
- Pocket Monsters: Episode Gold & Silver – Takeshi (Brock), Musashi's Sonansu (Jessie's Wobbuffet), Satoshi's Hinoarashi (Ash's Cyndaquil), Satoshi's Yorunozuku (Ash's Noctowl), Barri-chan (Mimey), Zippo
- Trouble Chocolate – Ham Ham, Spider Monster
- Zoids – Karl Schubaltz

2000

- Boys Be... – Tsuyoshi Ueno
- Hand Maid May – Kōtarō Nanbara
- Love Hina – Keitarō Urashima
- Mon Colle Knights – Tanaka

2001

- Chance Pop Session – Muraki
- Earth Maiden Arjuna – Chris Hawken
- Fruits Basket – Makoto Takei
- I My Me! Strawberry Eggs – Tofu Tofukuji, Akira Fukae
- Inuyasha – Hōjō
- PaRappa the Rapper – Shop Manager
- Prétear – Kaoru Awayuki
- Project ARMS – Takeshi Tomoe
- Sadamitsu the Destroyer – Sadamitsu Tsubaki
- Samurai – Kurikichi
- Shaman King – Horokeu Usui (a.k.a. Horohoro), Hang Zang-Ching
- Shingu: Secret of the Stellar Wars – Hachiyou Tsunamori
- X/1999 – Kakyo Kuzuki

2002

- A Cheeky Angel – Tasuke Yasuda
- Chobits – Hiroyasu Ueda
- Heat Guy J – Kia Freeborn
- Panyo Panyo Di Gi Charat – Deji Devil
- Pocket Monsters Side Stories – Takeshi (Brock), Musashi's Sonansu (Jessie's Wobbuffet), Satoshi's Hinoarashi (Ash's Cyndaquil), Satoshi's Yorunozuku (Ash's Noctowl), Barri-chan (Mimey), Zippo
- Pocket Monsters: Advanced Generation – Takeshi (Brock), Musashi's Sonansu (Jessie's Wobbuffet), Satoshi's Kimori/Juputor/Jukain (Ash's Treecko/Grovyle/Sceptile) Satoshi's Hinoarashi (Ash's Cyndaquil), Satoshi's Yorunozuku (Ash's Noctowl), Barri-chan (Mimey), Harley's Nokutas (Harley's Cacturne)
- Love Hina Again – Keitaro Urashima
- Rockman EXE – Yuuichiro, Higure, Coloredman, 'Numberman
- The Twelve Kingdoms – Ikuya Asano
- Witch Hunter Robin – Juzo Narumi

2003

- Cromartie High School – Jun Ishikawa
- Full Metal Panic? Fumoffu – Fuwa-senpai, Mori
- GetBackers – Yuuji Takamura
- Konjiki no Gash Bell!! – Karudio
- One Piece – Sarquiss, Stainless
- Peacemaker Kurogane – Tatsunosuke
- Stellvia of the Universe – Pierre Takida

2004

- Bleach – Sora Inoue
- Burst Angel – Kyohei Tachibana
- Diamond Daydreams – Mitsuru Shiraishi
- Fullmetal Alchemist – Solf J. Kimblee, Roa
- Genshiken – Chairman
- Ghost in the Shell: Stand Alone Complex 2nd GIG – Ueda
- Inuyasha – Akitoki Hōjō
- Midori Days – Shuichi Takamizawa
- My-HiME – Masashi Takeda
- The Prince of Tennis – Jiro Akutagawa
- Doki Doki School Hours – Yūichi Kudō
- Yu-Gi-Oh! Duel Monsters GX – Mitsuru Ayanokouji, Kozaky
- Zipang – Navigation Officer Kōhei Oguri

2005

- Aria the Animation – Udo "Woody" Ayanokoji the 51st
- Black Jack – Tanikawa
- Buzzer Beater – DT
- Elemental Gelade – Rowen
- Emma - A Victorian Romance – Hakim Atawari
- Fighting Beauty Wulong – Takuro Kaburagi
- Gag Manga Biyori – Opening song performer and various characters
- Hell Girl – Hajime Shibata
- Honey and Clover – Shinobu Morita
- Mushishi – Adashino

2006

- 009-1 – Doctor Green
- Aria the Natural – Udo "Woody" Ayanokoji the 51st
- Gag Manga Biyori 2 – Pensuke
- Galaxy Angel Rune – Denish
- Ghost Slayers Ayashi – Kumoshichi
- Ouran High School Host Club – Nekozawa Umehito
- Pokémon: The Mastermind of Mirage Pokémon – Takeshi (Brock)
- Pocket Monsters: Diamond & Pearl – Takeshi (Brock), Musashi's Sonansu (Jessie's Wobbuffet), Satoshi's Jukain (Ash's Sceptile), Satoshi's Mokazaru/Gokazaru (Ash's Monferno/Infernape), Satoshi's Hinoarashi/Magmarashi (Ash's Cyndaquil/Quilava), Satoshi's Yorunozuku (Ash's Noctowl), Shinji's Glion (Paul's Gliscor), Shinji's Būbā/Būburn (Paul's Magmar/Magmortar), Jun's Sawamura (Barry's Hitmonlee)
- Project Blue: Chikyū SOS – James
- The Third – Toy Joey

2007

- Case Closed – Inagaki Hiromasa
- D.Gray-man – Selim
- Devil May Cry – Kerry
- Mobile Suit Gundam 00 – Billy Katagiri
- Moetan – Naoto "Nao-kun" Tezuka
- Oh! Edo Rocket – Ears
- You're Under Arrest: Full Throttle – Staff

2008

- Aria the Originator – Udo "Woody" Ayanokoji the 51st
- Glass Maiden – Akira
- Gunslinger Girl -Il Teatrino- – Cristiano
- Kannagi: Crazy Shrine Maidens – Hagashima

2009

- Battle Spirits: Shonen Gekiha Dan – Magical Crown
- Darker than Black: Gemini of the Meteor – Ilya Sokoloff
- Fullmetal Alchemist: Brotherhood – Jean Havoc, Bido
- Golgo 13 – Danielle's Pimp
- Rideback – Haruki Hishida
- Tears to Tiara – Lector

2010

- Durarara!! – Takashi Nasujima
- Sgt. Frog – Darere
- Inuyasha: The Final Act - Hōjō

2011

- Blade – Agus
- Chihayafuru – Shinichi Murao
- Gosick – Simon Hunt
- Yondemasuyo, Azazel-san – Fujisaki

2012

- Pocket Monsters: Best Wishes! Season 2 – Shizui (Marlon)

2013

- Chiharafuru 2 – Shinichi Murao
- Gundam Build Fighters – Mario & Julio Renato
- Hunter × Hunter (2011) – Shoot McMahon
- Kill la Kill – Shirō Iori
- Pocket Monsters: Best Wishes! Season 2: Episode N – Takeshi (Brock)
- Pocket Monsters: Best Wishes! Season 2: Decolora Adventure – Musashi's Sonansu (Jessie's Wobbuffet), Barri-chan (Mimey)
- Pocket Monsters: XY – Musashi's Sonansu (Jessie's Wobbuffet), Satoshi's Keromatsu/Gekogashira (Ash's Froakie/Frogadier), Monsieur Pierre's Kureffi (Monsieur Pierre's Klefki), Shōta's Kimori/Juputoru (Sawyer's Treecko/Grovyle)
- Robotics;Notes – Maguyan
- Saint Seiya Omega – Mira

2014

- Hanayamata – Hana's Father
- Tokyo Ghoul – Itsuki Marude

2015

- Beautiful Bones: Sakurako's Investigation – Father Tominaga
- DD Fist of the North Star II – Fudō
- Pocket Monsters: XY&Z – Musashi's Sonansu (Jessie's Wobbuffet), Satoshi's Gekogashira/Gekkoga (Ash's Frogadier/Greninja), Monsieur Pierre's Kureffi (Monsieur Pierre's Klefki), Shōta's Juputoru/Jukain (Sawyer's Grovyle/Sceptile)
- Samurai Warriors – Maeda Keiji
- Saint Seiya: Soul of Gold – Tanngrisnir Hercules
- Show by Rock!! – Maple Arisugawa
- Tokyo Ghoul √A – Itsuki Marude
- Seiyu's Life! – Manager of Voice Entertainment
- One-Punch Man – Watch Dog Man
- Ushio to Tora – Kappa

2016

- Battle Spirits Double Drive – Azasu
- Nobunaga no Shinobi – Saitō Tatsuoki
- Pocket Monsters: Sun & Moon – Takeshi (Brock), Musashi's Sonansu (Jessie's Wobbuffet), Māmane's Kuwagannon (Sophocles's Vikavolt), Barri-chan (Mimey), Lychee's Rugarugan (Olivia's Lycanroc), Māmane's father (Sophocles' father)

2017

- Kirakira PreCure a la Mode – Gummy
- March Comes in Like a Lion – Eisaku Noguchi
- Puri-Puri Chiichan – Doctor Hatena

2018

- Hi Score Girl – Blanka

2019

- Mob Psycho 100 II – Red Raincoat
- One-Punch Man 2 – Watch Dog Man
- Cautious Hero: The Hero Is Overpowered but Overly Cautious – Deathmagla

2020

- Deca-Dence – Sarkozy

2021

- Shaman King (2021) – Horokeu Usui (a.k.a. Horohoro)

2024

- Mission: Yozakura Family – Makoto Kawashita

=== OVA ===
- Dirty Pair Flash (1994) – Operator
- Fobia (1995) – Mutsumi Narita
- Magic User's Club (1996) – Akane's Boyfriend #3
- Master of Mosquiton (1996) – Honoo
- Very Private Lesson (1998) – Arihiko Tairaku
- Sol Bianca: The Legacy (1999) – Percy
- Angel Sanctuary (2000) – Yue Katou
- Rurouni Kenshin: Seisōhen (2001) – Sagara Sanosuke
- Digital Juice (2002) – Chicken
- Futari Ecchi (2002) – Makoto Onoda
- Nurse Witch Komugi (2002) – Mugi-maru
- Akane Maniax (2004) – Andorō Umeda
- Ayashi Divine Comedy (2007) – Kumoshichi
- Detroit Metal City (2008) – Johannes Krauser II

=== Theatrical animation ===
- Pocket Monsters films (1998–) – Takeshi (Brock), Musashi's Sonans (Jessie's Wobbuffet)
- Escaflowne (2000) – Reeden
- Ojarumaru the Movie: The Promised Summer - Ojaru and Semira (2000) – Kisuke
- Cowboy Bebop: Knockin' on Heaven's Door (2001) – Lee Sampson
- Digimon Frontier: Island of Lost Digimon (2002) – Dinohyumon
- Inuyasha the Movie: The Castle Beyond the Looking Glass (2002) – Hojo, Akitoki Hojo
- Eyeshield 21: The Phantom Golden Bowl (2003) – Tarō Raimon
- Dōbutsu no Mori (2006) – Sakurajima
- Oblivion Island: Haruka and the Magic Mirror (2009) – Picanta
- Mobile Suit Gundam 00 the Movie: A Wakening of the Trailblazer (2010) – Billy Katagiri

=== Tokusatsu ===
- Tokusou Robo Janperson (1993) – Robot Angel (ep. 15)
- Kaitou Sentai Lupinranger VS Keisatsu Sentai Patranger (2018) – Destra Majjo (eps. 1 – 7, 9 – 11, 13 – 15, 17 – 18, 20 – 23, 25 – 26, 28 – 30, 32, 34 – 36, 38 – 39, 41 – 42)
- Kaitou Sentai Lupinranger VS Keisatsu Sentai Patranger en Film (2018) – Destra Majjo
- Mashin Sentai Kiramager (2020) - Stove Jamen (eps. 7-8)

=== Games ===
- EVE Burst Error (1997) – Susumu Nikaido
- Capcom vs. SNK: Millennium Fight 2000 (2000) – Blanka, Balrog/Vega
- Capcom vs. SNK 2: Millionaire Fighting 2001 (2001) – Blanka, Balrog/Vega
- Everybody's Golf 5 (2007) – Kid/Felipe
- Galaxy Angel (2002) – Takuto Meyers
- Galaxy Angel: Moonlit Lovers (2003) – Takuto Meyers
- Galaxy Angel: Eternal Lovers (2004) – Takuto Meyers
- Galaxy Angel II ~Zettai Ryouiki no Tobira~ (2006) – Takuto Meyers
- Galaxy Angel II ~Mugen Kairou no Kagi~ (2007) – Takuto Meyers
- Growlanser – Oscar Reeves
- Growlanser II: The Sense of Justice – Oscar Reeves
- Guilty Gear XX (2002) – Zappa
- Final Fantasy XIII (2009) – Amodar
- Final Fantasy XIII-2 (2011) – Amodar
- Lego Batman 3: Beyond Gotham (2014) – Saint Walker
- Marvel vs. Capcom: Clash of Super Heroes (1998) – Strider Hiryu, Jin Saotome
- Marvel vs. Capcom 2: New Age of Heroes (2000) – Strider Hiryu, Jin Saotome
- Megami Ibunroku Persona – (Masao 'Mark' Inaba)
- Namco × Capcom (2005) – Krino Sandra, Zabel Zarock/Lord Raptor
- Nana (PS2) (2005) – Kyosuke Takakura
- Project X Zone (2012) – Zabel Zarock/Lord Raptor
- Project X Zone 2 (2015) – Zabel Zarock/Lord Raptor
- Teppen (2024) – Strider Hiryu
- Rockman X7 (Tornado Debonion)
- Rockman ZX (Purprill the Mandroid)
- Rival Schools series (1998) – Shoma Sawamura
- Samurai Warriors – Maeda Keiji, Sasaki Kojirō
- Shikigami no Shiro – Roger Sasuke
- Star Ocean: The Second Story – Claude C. Kenni
- Street Fighter Zero 3 (1998) – Blanka, Balrog/Vega
- Street Fighter III 2nd Impact: Giant Attack (1997) – Urien
- Street Fighter IV (2008) – Blanka
- Street Fighter V (2016) – Blanka
- Street Fighter 6 (2023) – Blanka
- Super Street Fighter IV (2009) – Blanka
- Street Fighter X Tekken (2012) – Blanka
- Super Robot Wars Impact (Akito Tenkawa)
- Super Robot Wars MX (Akito Tenkawa)
- Super Robot Wars A Portable (Akito Tenkawa)
- 2nd Super Robot Wars Z (Crow/Crowe Brust)
- Super Robot Wars BX (Akito Tenkawa)
- Super Smash Bros. for Nintendo 3DS and Wii U – Greninja
- Super Smash Bros. Ultimate - Greninja
- Summon Night Craft Sword Monogatari: Hajimari no Ishi – Tram
- Tales of Innocence – Spada Belforma/Durandal
- Tokimeki Memorial – Yoshio Saotome
- Tokimeki Memorial Girl's Side: 2nd Kiss – Motoharu Masaki
- Ultimate Marvel vs. Capcom 3 (2011) – Strider Hiryu
- Vampire: The Night Warriors(1994) – Zabel Zarock/Lord Raptor, Rikuo/Aulbath, Jon Talbain/Gallon
- Vampire Hunter: Darkstalkers' Revenge (1995) – Zarbel Zarock/Lord Raptor, Rikuo/Aulbath, Jon Talbain/Gallon
- Vampire Savior: The Lord of Vampire (1997) – Zarbel Zarock/Lord Raptor, Rikuo/Aulbath, Jon Talbain/Gallon
- Xenogears – Billy Lee Black

=== Drama CDs ===
- Mainichi Seiten! series 2: Kodomo wa Tomaranai (Tatsuya-fishmonger)
- Setsunai Koi Daze – Wataru Shinjou
- Shiawase ni Shite Agemasu – Toshiyuki Oosawa
- Solid Love – Kei Oujisawa

=== Dubbing roles ===
==== Live-action ====
- Anna and the Apocalypse – Arthur Savage (Paul Kaye)
- I Still Know What You Did Last Summer – Darick the Dockhand (Benjamin Brown)
- The Matrix – Mouse (Matt Doran)
- Saturday Night Fever – Bobby C. (Barry Miller)

==== Animation ====
- Ozzy & Drix – Osmosis Jones

== See also ==
- Official agency profile (in Japanese)
- Yūji Ueda at Anime News Network's encyclopedia
- Yūji Ueda at IMDb
- Yūji Ueda at the Japanese Movie Database (in Japanese)
