= Uno Kanda =

Japanese model, actress, tarento, and fashion designer

- 神田 うの
- Born: March 28, 1975 (age 51); Kawasaki, Kanagawa, Japan
- Other names: Uno Nishimura (real name); Uno-chan (うのちゃん)
- Occupations: Model, actress, tarento, fashion designer
- Years active: 1989–
- Agent: Space Craft
- Height: 1.7 m (5 ft 7 in)

Uno Nishimura (西村 うの, Nishimura Uno; born March 28, 1975, in Kawasaki, Kanagawa, Japan), better known as Uno Kanda (神田 うの, Kanda Uno), is a Japanese model, actress, tarento, and fashion designer represented by Space Craft.

== Filmography ==
=== TV series ===
Year	Title	Role	Network	Notes
1996	Only You: Aisa Rete	Chika Oishi	NTV	
1999	Rinjin wa Hisoka ni Warau	Misato Sakurazawa	NTV	
2000	Nurse no Oshigoto 3	Masoka Akagi	Fuji TV	
	Houjou Jishū	Renge	NHK	
2001	Beauty 7	Sakura Izumi	NTV	
2002	Satorare	Chiharu Nakata	TV Asahi	
2006	Akai Kiseki	Fuyuka Kurihara	TBS	
2006	Purimadamu	Emiko	NTV	
2006	Koshino-ka no Tatakau On'na-tachi Kimottama Okā-chan to Powerful Sanshimai	Michiko Koshino	NTV	
2009	Tantei M	Tokun	NTV	

=== TV series ===
Year	Title	Network	Notes
1994	Gakkoude wa Oshiete Kurenai Koto!!	Fuji TV	
1994	Vocabula	Fuji TV	Occasional appearances
1996	King's Brunch	TBS	
1997	Music Jump	NHK	
	Kinniku Banzuke	TBS	
	Madamunmun	TBS	
	All Night Fuji	Fuji TV	
	Naruhodo! The World	Fuji TV	Occasional appearances
	Sekai no Chou Gouka Chinpin Ryouri	Fuji TV	Occasional appearances
	Pikaichi	TV Asahi	
	Dotch Cooking Show	YTV	Early regular appearances
2012	Non Stop!	Fuji TV	

=== Films ===
Year	Title	Notes
1997	Ultraman Zearth	
1999	Gohatto	
2002	Nurse no Oshigoto The Movie	
2002	Pokémon Heroes	
2009	Baby Baby Baby!	
2011	Eagle Talon	
