= Mr. Mime =

Pokémon species

- Pokémon character
- Mr. Mime artwork by Ken Sugimori
- First game: Pokémon Red and Blue (1996)
- Designed by: Ken Sugimori (finalized)
- Voiced by: English: Kayzie Rogers Michele Knotz (Sun and Moon-Present); Japanese: Yūji Ueda

In-universe information
- Species: Pokémon
- Type: Psychic and Fairy; Ice and Psychic (Galar)

Mr. Mime (/ˌmɪstərˈmaɪm/), known in Japan as Barrierd (Japanese: バリヤード, Hepburn: Bariyādo), is a Pokémon species in Nintendo and Game Freak's Pokémon franchise. Mr. Mime first appeared in the video games Pokémon Red and Blue and subsequent sequels, later appearing in various merchandise, spinoff titles and animated and printed adaptations of the franchise. Mr. Mime is voiced by Yūji Ueda in Japanese. In English, it was voiced by Kayzie Rogers and Michele Knotz.

Known as the Barrier Pokémon, and the Dancing Pokémon in its Galarian form, Mr. Mime are skilled mimes even from a young age. As they mature, they gain the ability to psychically generate invisible objects such as walls and other barriers. In the anime, a Mr. Mime appears early on as a house cleaner and helper to Delia, the mother of series protagonist Ash Ketchum, while others are shown as entertainers or cooks. In the Pokémon Adventures manga, its abilities are utilized to create training rooms and surround an entire city with a barrier to prevent access from the outside world.

Mr. Mime's appearance has been heavily criticized since its inception due to its humanoid design, as well as for combining many poorly received design aspects of mimes and clowns. However, in comparison to more common series characters, the character's design has been praised, in particular for its scene in the live action 2019 film Detective Pikachu.

== Design and characteristics ==
Mr. Mime is a species of fictional creatures called Pokémon created for the Pokémon media franchise. Developed by Game Freak and published by Nintendo, the Japanese franchise began in 1996 with the video games Pokémon Red and Green for the Game Boy, which were later released in North America as Pokémon Red and Blue in 1998. In these games and their sequels, the player assumes the role of a Trainer whose goal is to capture and use the creatures' special abilities to combat other Pokémon. Some Pokémon can transform into stronger species through a process called evolution via various means, such as exposure to specific items. Each Pokémon has one or two elemental types, which define its advantages and disadvantages when battling other Pokémon. A major goal in each game is to complete the Pokédex, a comprehensive Pokémon encyclopedia, by capturing, evolving, and trading with other Trainers to obtain individuals from all Pokémon species.

Introduced in Red and Blue, the design first started as pixel art sprites by the development team, with a single color identity chosen to work within the Super Game Boy hardware limitations. While conceived as a group effort by multiple developers at Game Freak, the finalized design and artwork was done by Ken Sugimori. Originally tasked with drawing the characters to illustrate a planned strategy guide by Game Freak when the games released, Sugimori drew all the sprites for the game in his style to not only unify their designs visually but also modify any design elements he felt were amiss, while trying to retain the original sprite artist's unique style.

The Pokémon was originally called "Barrierd" in Japanese. When the games were localized for English-speaking audiences as Red and Blue, Nintendo of America gave the various Pokémon species descriptive names related to their appearance or features as a means to make them more relatable to American children, and renamed it "Mr. Mime" based on its appearance as a mime. However, translator Nob Ogasawara voiced concern regarding giving Pokémon gender-specific names, worrying about what would happen if the series were to introduce genders for Pokémon at a later date. Though the president of Nintendo of America dismissed his concerns, Pokémon Gold and Silver would introduce the concept of gendered Pokémon, resulting in both males and females of the species being called Mr. Mime.

Appearing as an anthropomorphic creature, it has a pink head with red cheeks and blue horns resembling hair, a round, white body with a red spot in the middle, light-pink arms and legs that are connected to its body by red spheres, white, five-fingered hands and blue feet that curl upward at the tips. Their hands are depicted with four fingers and an opposable thumb, with larger fingertips and red dots on their underside. However, game representations of the character featured only three fingers on each hand until the release of Pokémon Ruby and Sapphire. When asked by Rob Letterman, the director of the live action film Detective Pikachu, to explain what exactly Mr. Mime is, The Pokémon Company responded with, "We don't know."

== Appearances ==
=== In video games ===
In the video game series, Mr. Mime can be acquired from an in-game trade in Pokémon Red and Blue and Pokémon FireRed and LeafGreen. It has since appeared in several sequels, including Pokémon Gold and Silver, Pokémon X and Y, and Pokémon Legends: Arceus. In Pokémon Diamond and Pearl, Mr. Mime gains a new pre-evolved form, Mime Jr., which evolves into Mr. Mime when leveled up while knowing the move Mimic. Mr. Mime appears in Pokemon Sword and Shield, only obtainable via trading another Pokemon. However, the game also introduces a "regional variant," an alternative form that can only be found in the game's given setting. This variant can evolve into a new Pokemon called Mr. Rime.

Outside of the main series, Mr. Mime has appeared in multiple spin-offs. In Pokémon Stadium 2, Mr. Mime stars in its own minigame called "Mr. Mime Pong". Poké Balls appear on the field and by using Mr. Mime's Barrier, players can send the Poké Balls to the other player's fields. Mr. Mime appears in the augmented reality game Pokémon Go, where it is only obtainable in Europe. It also appears in Pokémon UNITE and Pokémon Sleep.

=== In anime and manga ===
In the anime, a Mr. Mime lives with Delia Ketchum. It does housework for her in exchange for room and board. In this Mr. Mime's debut episode, Ash Ketchum, the series protagonist, dressed as a Mr. Mime to inspire a real Mr. Mime who worked for a circus. Delia knew about this, so when a wild Mr. Mime came to her door and wanted lunch, she thought it was Ash in costume and provided it with food. When the real Ash showed up, still in costume, she was quite puzzled, but wound up keeping Mimey (バリちゃん, Barichan) as her live-in maid. In Pokémon Journeys, it is revealed to have been captured by Ash off-screen, and aids Ash in various capacities throughout the series.

In the Pokémon Adventures manga, Mr. Mime was first seen under the control of Sabrina, an antagonist. It is used by the villainous organization Team Rocket to generate an invisible wall to seal off the whole of Saffron City. Another Mr. Mime also appeared under the ownership of Crystal, one of the main protagonists of the series. It has the ability to create invisible walls and rooms, much like Sabrina's Mr. Mime.

=== In live action film ===
Mr. Mime's scene has been described as a standout in the film and received varied reactions regarding the design

A Mr. Mime appears in the film Pokémon: Detective Pikachu, being interrogated by the titular character and his partner Tim Goodman, due to being an informant for the latter's father. Completely mute in the film, it communicates through hand gestures and is initially uncooperative until Goodman engages its behavior by gesturing through mime to "set it on fire" by "dousing it with gasoline and a match" if it doesn't cooperate. According to director Rob Letterman, the scene was one of the earliest written for the film, and was inspired by the interrogation scene in the film Seven. Additionally an actual mime, Trigby, was brought in for consultation and to help rehearse the scene with the actors. The Pokémon Company initially objected to letting the film use the character, feeling Mr. Mime was a poor fit for the film, until Letterman pitched the suggestion directly to their president Tsunekazu Ishihara, who laughed and let them proceed.

Adapting Mr. Mime to a 3D model for the film proved difficult, and required a different approach than they had used towards other Pokémon in the movie in an effort to retain the design's more revamped aspects. Visual effects supervisor Erik Nordby stated "When you look at the character, it instantly feels creepy. We had to figure out what aspects we could push and pull." To this end, they focused on making every surface of his model resemble common toys, utilizing aspects such as dodgeballs for his joints, while the gloves were modeled after those given as prizes at fairs. The visual effects team worked to add more elements to enhance the character's silhouette, such as subtle freckles in order to give Mr. Mime an air of cuteness. Facial hair was additionally added to try and keep his face realistic without it resembling a deformed human face, culminating in a look that Letterman felt was "funny and disturbing."

== Critical reception ==
Since appearing in the Pokémon franchise, Mr. Mime has received a generally mixed reception, with critics, including from 1Up.com and Retronauts, disliking its mime aesthetic. The staff of GamesRadar complained about its design, noting that while "mimes/clowns aren't the easiest material to work with in the first place," they felt it was creepy due to its gangly arms and humanoid appearance compared to other Pokémon. Fellow contributor Carolyn Gudmundson further elaborated on the sentiment, noting that the humanoid designs were some of the most overused amongst Pokémon in the franchise, and thar Mr. Mime was both one of the most infamous and "horrific monstrosities" in this regard. Joe Anderton of Digital Spy criticized Mr. Mime, calling it the worst Pokémon and creepy in nature.

Despite this negative reception, Mr. Mime has been identified as being among the more popular Pokémon. In the book Gaming Cultures and Place in Asia-Pacific, David Surman defended Mr. Mime's design, suggesting that Sugimori developed it—along with Jynx—to draw upon the humor of heta-uma (a term meaning bad/nice). The book notes that the designs "oscillate between the poles of good and bad," and as a result offer diversity within the game and invite scrutiny from players. Mr. Mime was cited by writer Vincenzo Idone Cassone as an example of fans making light out of dissonant elements in the series. He cited a common fan-theory that stated Mimey was actually protagonist Ash Ketchum's father, noting that it led to fans of the series tying several unrelated elements together to construct a comedic explanation due to a lack of clarification in the series' canon as to the true whereabouts of Ash's father and Mimey's unique traits in the anime.

Its appearance in the Detective Pikachu film received generally positive reception. Patricia Hernandez of Polygon stated that Mr. Mime "steals the show" in the film, while Austen Goslin of Polygon found Mr. Mime's appearance to be terrifying in nature. In an interview with GameSpot, lead actor of the film Justice Smith revealed that the Mr. Mime interrogation scene was one of his favorites. Inside Games labelled the scene with Mr. Mime as creative and entertaining, praising it for making Mr. Mime more interesting in the film than in its standard appearances. Cassone additionally noted that several unique attributes of Mr. Mime's design in the film, such as its extensive detail, anthropomorphic appearance, and well-acted performance elicited "both disturbance and amusement" in those who watched the film.
