= Ultraman Zearth =

Fictional character

Ultraman Zearth (ウルトラマンゼアス, Urutoraman Zeasu) is a fictional character from the Ultra Series of tokusatsu and the name of a 1996 movie in the series.

== Premise ==
Ultraman Zearth is a parody of Ultraman. He hails from the Land of Bright in Nebula Z95. He has a big red face and dislikes dirt, and will go to great lengths to wash it off his hands. His goal is to clean the polluted Earth. He transforms with an electric toothbrush, which is consistent with his hygiene fixation. He's not quite adept at being a superhero, but at least he tries his best.

His human form is Katsuto Asahi who also dislikes dirt like Zearth.

== Appearances ==
Zearth's first movie, Ultraman Zearth, was released in 1996 to celebrate the 30th anniversary of the original Ultraman, as part of the Ultraman Wonderful World (along with Revive! Ultraman and Ultraman Company). Zearth's movie appearances include Ultraman Zearth (March 9, 1996) and Ultraman Zearth 2: Superman Big Battle - Light and Shadow (ウルトラマンゼアス2 超人大戦 光と影, Urutoraman Zeasu Tsū Chōjin Taisen Hikari to Kage) (April 12, 1997). Ultraman Zearth 2 is paired with the first Ultra Nyan short.

=== Cameos by other characters ===
The movies include cameos by most of the original Science Patrol from Ultraman. Arashi is a helicopter reporter (which is not too far from what he currently does in real life). In Ultraman Zearth, Hayata is a night watchman (who holds his flashlight up like a Beta Capsule) and in Ultraman Zearth 2 he is a common citizen who tries to transform into Ultraman with a spoon (echoing Hayata's performance from episode 34), Fuji (the only woman who ever catches the Mydo plane taking off from a secret base exit, which happens to be a billboard), Ide (as a photographer), and Captain Muramatsu, as a fisherman. In Ultraman Zearth 2, Ide shows up as the fisherman's son with a photograph of his dad (actor Akiji Kobayashi, who played Captain Muramatsu, died between films). And finally, in Ultraman Zearth 2, we are treated to a rare cameo reappearance of Jiro Dan, none other than Hideki Go from Return of Ultraman as a telecast reporter on TV.

The second movie features "Digital Kanegon", which is a take on the original Kanegon from Ultra Q. It also features Kohji Moritsugu (Dan Moroboshi from Ultraseven) as Captain Ban Satsuma. The running joke is that he frequently lets slip that he knows that we in the audience know that he's Mr. Moritsugu/Dan Moroboshi/Ultraseven. He says "Natsukashii! (how nostalgic!)" when he sees Capsule Monster Miraclon. At the end of the movie, he also nudges Katsuto and tells him he'll have to teach him the heel drop sometime, which implies that Dan knows that Katsuto is really Zearth.

== Characters ==
=== Ultraman Zearth ===
==== Stats ====
- Height: 60 meter
- Weight: 54,540 tons
- Flight Speed: Mach 19.9
- Running Speed: Mach 5.55
- Swimming Speed: 889 kilometer per hour
- Tunneling Speed: Mach 1
- Jumping Distance: 1000 meter
- Home Planet: Land of Bright (ピカリの国, Pikari no Kuni) in Nebula Z95 (Z95星雲, Zetto Kyūjū-go Seiun), 2,990,000 light years from Earth.
- Human Form: Katsuto Asahi
- Transformation Item: Pikari Brush (ピカリブラッシャー, Pikari Burasshā) in Ultraman Zearth / Pikari Brush 2 (ピカリブラッシャー2, Pikari Burasshā Tsū) in Ultraman Zearth 2.

==== Weapons ====
- Spachouchoura Beam (スペシュッシュラ光線, Supeshusshura Kōsen)
  Zearth's "+" style finishing move. Can destroy monsters in one shot. This move has been quoted by Mydo's AI, MIDORI, and Alien Benzen, as a dangerous attack that could destroy Earth in one shot if it hits a particularly powerful source of energy, such as Cotton-Poppe.
- Cross Spachouchoura Beam (クロス・スペシュッシュラ光線, Kurosu Supeshusshura Kōsen)
  Zearth's "x" style finishing move. Can destroy monsters in one shot.
- Ultra Warp Beam (ウルトラワープビーム, Urutora Wāpu Bīmu)
  Teleports objects/people using beams of light from his eyes.
- Zearth Kick (ゼアス・キック, Zeasu Kikku)
  A kick combo.
- Super Zearth Kick (スーパー・ゼアス・キック, Sūpā Zeasu Kikku)
  A spinning kick with enough force to send an enemy flying into space.
- Ultra Heel Drop (Zearth Heel Crash) (ウルトラかかと落とし（ゼアスヒールクラッシュ）, Urutora Kakato Otoshi (Zeasu Hīru Kurasshu))
  An axe kick.
- Zearth Machine Gun Kick (ゼアス・マシンガンキック, Zeasu Mashin Gan Kikku)
  A kick combo.
- Zearth Knee Kick (ゼアス・ニーキック, Zeasu Nī Kikku)
  An electric knee kick.
- Zearth Drop Kick (ゼアス・ドロップキック, Zeasu Doroppu Kikku)
  A drop kick from high above.
- Zearth Flying Drop Kick (ゼアス・フライング・ドロップキック, Zeasu Furaingu Doroppu Kikku)
  A drop kick from high above at maximum flight speed.
- Zearth Chop (ゼアス・チョップ, Zeasu Choppu)
  A hand chop.
- Zearshutoh (ゼアシュトー, Zeashutō)
  A chop from high above.
- Zearth Cross Ver. 1.0 (ゼアスクロスVer.1.0（バージョンイッテンレー）, Zeasu Kurosu Bājon Ittenrē)
  An energy chop.
- Zearth Punch (ゼアス・パンチ, Zeasu Panchi)
  A punch combo.
- Zearth K.O. Punch (Zearth Hyper Punch) (ゼアスKOパンチ（ゼアスハイパーパンチ）, Zeasu Kē Ō Panchi (Zeasu Haipā Panchi))
  A powerful and aimed punch.
- Zearscan (ゼアスキャン, Zeasukyan)
  Sterilizes the area within a 50 km radius. Not used in movies.
- Ultra Rewind (ウルトラリワンド, Urutora Riwaindo)
  Rewinds time. Not used in movies.
- Ultra Stretch (ウルトラストレッチ, Urutora Sutoretchi)
  Slows time. Not used in movies.
- Ultra Blender (ウルトラブレンダー, Urutora Burendā)
  Makes hyperspace temporarily. Not used in movies.
- Zearth Counterblow (ゼアスカウンターブロー, Zeasu Kauntāburō)
  A horizontal chop. Not used in movies.
- Z Capsule Light Monster Miraclon
  A gift to Zearth from his father.

=== Mydo ===
The Mysterious Yonder Defence Organization (超宇宙防衛機構, Chō Uchū Bōei Kikō), abbreviated as Mydo, is a space-based defense organization formed around the Earth Defense Federation (地球防衛連盟, Chikyū Bōei Renmei) with the mystery case that seems to be an alien from the end of the 20th century. It is a subsidiary of the International Defense Force (国際防衛軍, Kokusai Bōeigun), from the Asian headquarters, North America and South America, Europe, Africa, South Pacific, Silicon Valley, the Migo desert and Japan, to outer space; Delambre (Moon), Ellara, Sinope (both Jupiter), Titan (Saturn), Ariel (Uranus) also place the base. A large-scale organizational reformation was done between the first and second work. The Japanese branch camouflaged the Idemitsu Kosan gas station in the center of Tokyo, and the captains, deputy-captains, troops also work as managers, vice managers and shop clerks, hiding their identity. Naming is from Idemitsu's "Mydo Card".

- Shinpei Okochi (大河内 神平, Ōkōchi Shinpei): Aged 32 years old. The captain in Ultraman Zearth. He was promoted to a staff officer in of the International Defense Force in Ultraman Zearth 2.
- Butsukichi Konakai (小中井 仏吉, Konakai Butsukichi): Aged 30 years old. The deputy captain in Ultraman Zearth, He was promoted to a deputy staff officer of the International Defense Force in Ultraman Zearth 2.
- Ban Satsuma (薩摩 萬, Satsuma Ban): Aged 40 years old. The captain in Ultraman Zearth 2.
- Manabu Kazu (数 学, Kazu Manabu): Aged 32 years old. The deputy captain in Ultraman Zearth 2.
- Toru Hoshimi (星見 透, Hoshimi Tōru): Aged 19 years old. A female member. She has a younger brother named Yuki Hoshimi (星見 勇気, Hoshimi Yūki).
- Ganta Takemura (武村 岩太, Takemura Ganta): Aged 28 years old. A powerful man. He is a strong owner who can stop the carnage's car and is good at shooting and inventing.
- Katsuto Asahi (朝日 勝人, Asahi Katsuto): Ultraman Zearth's human form.
- MIDORI: An AI. A bell-shaped supercomputer that manages the Mydo underground base. The monitor is green as the name is. Only a Mydo captain whose voice print and palm print are registered can access it. Although it is an inorganic personality, there are also such as apologizing for failure to make an analysis mistake. In Ultraman Zearth 2, a female-faced polygon appeared, and the human smelled.

==== Mecha ====
Their mecha used to defend earth against the monsters and also support Ultraman Zearth.

- Mydo Headquarters: From the idea that the existence of outright military organizations buy antipathy of citizens in this era in which international disputes on the earth virtually disappeared, the ground part camouflaged on gas stations and the majority of base functions were established. It consists of a tower-like underground part with a height of 100 m or more. Although it was the Asian headquarters in the first film, due to an organizational reformation, it became the Japanese branch in the second work, and the headquarters base function moved to a certain place in Asia. As stated earlier, since members are usually working as gas clerk staff, on the ground part there is a skyfish launch port camouflaged in the office and cumberish main office rooms and advertisement signs as well as the facilities as a stand in the basement part, there is a room with a bell-shaped supercomputer MIDORI that manages the entire base and collects and analyzes information, including a room with skyfish storage and members, a maintenance room, a weapons laboratory, a chemical room, Data room, medical room, game hall, large public bath and training room. In the 2nd work, a locker with a special function was installed in the operational room, which caused the men's clothes to be worn instantly and teleported to the cockpit of the ride by entering the 2nd, the underground hangar was also expanded, and the starting point of the Sky Shark was newly established. When leaving the Sky Shark, the entire base will rise to the ground. Although it have been disturbed by neighbors several times, they managed to get through.
- Skyfish (スカイフィッシュ, Sukaifisshu): The main fighter of Mydo. Started off from the gas station signboard. Although it is a multi-wing aircraft designed with yellow and light blue, due to the flashy color scheme, the first one was described as a "bad taste" in the reporter. In the 2nd film, Unit 2 of the same shape and different painting (red and silver color) appeared. From the 2nd work, they came to the cockpit by teleporting from the above locker. The main equipment is a Mydo laser cannon. Also equipped with firearms such as missiles. In the second work, they mounted a light wire for locking an enemy monster called a laser rope on the nose.
- Sky Shark (スカイシャーク, Sukai Shāku): Mydo's battle mother ship which appeared in the second work. Boasting advanced flight technology and fighting power, it can also work underwater, in space, in the ground, as well as ordinary aviation. It uses jet engines in the atmosphere and rocket engines in outer space. Although having a high fighting ability such as loading dozens of the latest weapons, in the play, only the Zetton light cannon which reproduced the ray used when Zetton beat the first Ultraman was used. Besides, it has a strategy conference room, a sleeping room, a game center, etc.. The Zetton beam gun is a very powerful weapon that reproduces Zetton's rays (wavy rays that destroyed the color timer) by intersecting a current of 60 million amperes and electromagnetism of 25 million gauss. In defeating Ultraman Shadow, the original Ultraman was created to destroy the timer in the same way based on the fact that the color timer was destroyed by Zetton. If it was a clean hit it was a big deal, but it was rebounded without difficulty to the shadow who had anticipated attacks on color timers and crashed in reverse. Then it was destroyed with Shadow's Meriken missile.
- Mydo suit: Red and silver men's clothing worn at the time of exit, manufactured by the Mydo Super Science Team. It is super lightweight, excellent at heat and cold resistance, waterproofing and windbreak performance, and has high defense power. Dedicated boots have seven tools for every task. When working at the base, they wear the uniform at the gas station staff.
- Mydo Met: It is a special helmet custom made to wear at the exit, absorbing impact by 100% and not receiving bullet/flame damage.
- Stylus Gun (スタイラスガン, Sutairasu Gan): A small super gun carried by all the members. Normally you can fire a laser beam and you can shoot several kinds of laser beams, heat rays, anesthetic bullets, 45 caliber simulated bullets etc. by button operation.
- Drag & Drop (ドラッグアンドドロップ, Doraggu Ando Doroppu): Ultra high performance large beam gun similar to a shotgun, exclusively for Takemura. Cock your foregrip and charge energy. Blue destructive light bullets, yellow destructive lights, anesthetic lights can be shot and divided by button operation, and flame radiation is also possible. Because there is weight it cannot handle things other than Takemura. Assembly decomposition type, can be transported by attachment case.

=== Monsters, Aliens and Capsule Monsters ===
==== Alien Benzen ====
Chronic Disease Excess Gas Alien Alien Benzen (慢性ガス過多症宇宙人 ベンゼン星人, Mansei Gasu Katashō Uchūjin Benzen Seijin), in Ultraman Zearth and Ultraman Zearth 2, appeared in Earth to steal gold, the specific medicine of his chronic illness. He assumes a human form named Akuma Ogami (悪神 亜久馬, Ogami Akuma). He has the vehicle named Beagle (ビーグル, Bīguru) that transforms into a helicopter and a car.

==== Cotton-Poppe ====
Gold-Absorbing Explosive Beast Cotton-Poppe (吸金爆獣 コッテンポッペ, Kyūkin Bakujū Kottenpoppe), in Ultraman Zearth, is a monster used by Alien Benzen to steal gold all over Japan. "Cotton-Poppe" was named by Mydo, but its real name is Goldol Bombrus (ゴルドルボムルス, Gorudoru Bomurusu). Cotton-Poppe absorbed gold for the purpose of using it as medicine for its master, but this had the side effect of it absorbing massive quantities of energy which meant that it could explode if hit by Zearth's Spachouchoura Beam. Ultimately, it was paralysed by Zearth, then flown into space and detonated.

==== Ultraman Shadow ====
Space Combat Robot Ultraman Shadow (宇宙戦闘ロボット ウルトラマンシャドー, Uchū Sentō Robotto Urutoraman Shadō), in Ultraman Zearth 2, is an anti-Ultraman Zearth robot made by Alien Lady-Benzen. Unlike Zearth, it was black and yellow instead of Zearth's original colour. It had evil red eyes, pointed ears and head fin. It used full power to fight Zearth, but destroyed in battle by Zearth.

===== Stats =====
- Height: 62 meter
- Weight: 65,000 tons
- Flight Speed: Mach 21
- Running Speed: Mach 6
- Swimming Speed: Mach 1
- Jumping Distance: 1200 meter

===== Weapons =====
- Shadolium Ray (シャドリウム光線, Shadoriumu Kōsen)
  Shadow's "L" style finishing move. Rival's Zearth's in power.
- Mind Control Beam (マインドコントロールビーム, Maindo Kontorōru Bīmu)
  Can fire a beam of red energy from its eyes, turning humans into mindless followers of its creator, Lady-Benzen.
- Shadow Meriken (シャドー・メリケン, Shadō Meriken)
  Brass knuckles.
- Shadow Meriken Punch (シャドー・メリケンパンチ, Shadō Meriken Panchi)
  Multiple punches with the Shadow Merikens.
- Shadow Meriken Missiles (シャドー・メリケンミサイル, Shadō Meriken Misairu)
  Small missiles from the Shadow Merikens.
- Defense Shield (防御シールド, Bōgyo Shīrudo)
  Shadow has a Color Timer, like Zearth, but it is equipped with a shield to protect it against attack.
- Shadow Hyper Kick (シャドー・ハイパーキック, Shadō Haipā Kikku)
  A spinning kick.
- S Capsule Shadow Beast Darklar (Sカプセル影獣 ダークラー, Esu Kapuseru Eijū Dākurā)
  Shadow's monster capsule.

==== Alien Lady-Benzen ====
Bewitching Space Queen Alien Lady-Benzen (妖艶宇宙女王 レディベンゼン星人, Yōen Uchū Joō Redi Benzen Seijin), in Ultraman Zearth 2, is Alien Benzen's wife and controls Ultraman Shadow. She assumes a human form named Kagemi (影美). She congratulates Zearth and she says she will return to Earth to steal mankind's souls.

==== Miraclon ====
Z Capsule Light Beast Miraclon (Zカプセル光獣 ミラクロン, Zetto Kapuseru Kōjū Mirakuron), in Ultraman Zearth 2, is Zearth's Capsule Monster.

==== Darklar ====
S Capsule Shadow Beast Darklar (Sカプセル影獣 ダークラー, Esu Kapuseru Eijū Dākurā), in Ultraman Zearth 2, is Alien Lady-Benzen's Capsule Monster. To create the monster, Alien Lady-Benzen converted a lifeform named Claos (クラオス, Kuraosu) that inhabits Groge (グロゲ, Guroge), a moon of Planet Benzen.

==== Digital Kanegon ====
Space Card Rare Beast Digital Kanegon (宇宙カード珍獣 デジタルカネゴン, Uchū Kādo Chinjū Dejitaru Kanegon), in Ultraman Zearth 2, is a monster originated from Ultra Q, and is Mydo's mascot. He is a robotic version of Kanegon, and contained a computer which helped the team in their studies of the Benzen aliens.

== Cast ==
- Shinpei Okochi: Takaaki Ishibashi (石橋 貴明, Ishibashi Takaaki)
- Butsukichi Konakai: Noritake Kinashi (木梨 憲武, Kinashi Noritake)
- Katsuto Asahi: Masaharu Sekiguchi (関口 正晴, Sekiguchi Masaharu)
- Toru Hoshimi: Yuka Takaoka (高岡 由香, Takaoka Yuka)
- Ganta Takemura: Hiromoto Okubo (大久保 博元, Ōkubo Hiromoto)
- Akuma Ogami/Alien Benzen (Voice): Takeshi Kaga (鹿賀 丈史, Kaga Takeshi)
- Night watchman: Susumu Kurobe (黒部 進, Kurobe Susumu)
- Photographer: Masanari Nihei (二瓶 正也, Nihei Masanari)
- Reporter: Sandayū Dokumamushi (毒蝮 三太夫, Dokumamushi Sandayū)
- Housewife: Hiroko Sakurai (桜井 浩子, Sakurai Hiroko)

Appearing in Ultraman Zearth

- Kenichi (ケンイチ, Ken'ichi): Yūto Nakai (中井 悠人, Nakai Yūto)
- Akira (アキラ): Yūsuke Nishida (西田 優介, Nishida Yūsuke)
- Miyoko (ミヨ子): Saori Kawaguchi (川口 沙織, Kawaguchi Saori)
- Chīko (チーコ): Mizuki Tsuruoka (寉岡 瑞希, Tsuruoka Mizuki)
- Fisherman: Akiji Kobayashi (小林 昭二, Kobayashi Akiji)
- MIDORI (Voice): Mariko Fukushima (福島 まりこ, Fukushima Mariko)
- Narration: Hikaru Urano (浦野 光, Urano Hikaru)

Appearing in Ultraman Zearth 2

- Ban Satsuma: Kohji Moritsugu (森次 晃嗣, Moritsugu Kōji)
- Manabu Kazu: Ichirota Miyagawa (宮川 一朗太, Miyagawa Ichirōta)
- Kagemi/Alien Lady-Benzen (Voice): Uno Kanda (神田 うの, Kanda Uno)
- Master of Seidokaikan: Kazuyoshi Ishii (石井 和義, Ishii Kazuyoshi)
- Instructor of Seidokaikan: Nobuaki Kakuda (角田 信朗, Kakuda Nobuaki)
- Assistant instructor: Andy Hug (アンディ・フグ, Andi Fugu)
- Yuki Hoshimi: Hiromi Sakimoto (崎本 大海, Sakimoto Hiromi) (Played as "崎元 大海")
- Ichiro (一郎, Ichirō): Yūtarō Akashi (明石 勇太郎, Akashi Yūtarō)
- Jiro (二郎, Jirō): Yūichi Kōda (甲田 雄一, Kōda Yūichi)
- Saburo (三郎, Saburō): Kenji Terada (寺田 賢二, Terada Kenji)
- Telecast reporter: Jiro Dan (団 時朗, Dan Jirō)
- Onlookers: Yasuhiko Saijo (西條 康彦, Saijō Yasuhiko), Yuriko Hishimi (ひし美 ゆり子, Hishimi Yuriko)
- MIDORI (Voice): Kanako Itō (いとう かなこ, Itō Kanako)
- Digital Kanegon (Voice): Chika Sakamoto (坂本 千夏, Sakamoto Chika)

== Theme song ==
- "Shuwatch! Ultraman Zearth" (シュワッチ!ウルトラマンゼアス, Shuwatchi! Urutoraman Zeasu)
  - Lyrics: Shinya Jinma (じんま しんや, Jinma Shinya)
  - Composition: James Shimoji (ジェイムス 下地, Jeimusu Shimoji)
  - Artist: Tunnels (とんねるず, Ton'neruzu)

== Games ==
A game adaption of Ultraman Zearth was available for PlayStation.

== Legacy ==
- Both Ultraman Zearth and Ultraman Shadow would later make appearances in future Ultra Series:
  - Zearth made an appearance in two New Century Ultraman Legend theatrical shorts in 2002 and 2003, and Ultra Galaxy Fight: The Destined Crossroad in 2022.
  - Shadow made a reappearance in Ultraman Regulos: First Mission. This version was built by Alien Zarab, based on blueprints stolen from Alien Lady-Benzen.
