= Ojarumaru the Movie: The Promised Summer - Ojaru and Semira =

- Kanji: 映画おじゃる丸 約束の夏 おじゃるとせみら
- Revised Hepburn: Eiga Ojarumaru: Yakusoku no Natsu - Ojaru to Semira
- Directed by: Akitaro Daichi
- Screenplay by: Reiko Yoshida
- Produced by: Atsushi Ito; Hisako Matsumoto
- Starring: Hiroko Konishi; Rie Iwasubo; Yuriko Fuchizaki; Harumi Ikowa; Masako Nozawa; Kazuya Ichijō; Yuji Ueda; Omi Minami
- Edited by: Akio Nakagawa
- Music by: Harukichi Yamamoto
- Production company: Gallop
- Distributed by: Toei Company
- Release date: July 15, 2000
- Running time: 47 minutes
- Country: Japan
- Language: Japanese

Ojarumaru the Movie: The Promised Summer - Ojaru and Semira (映画おじゃる丸 約束の夏 おじゃるとせみら, Eiga Ojarumaru: Yakusoku no Natsu - Ojaru to Semira) is a short film in the Ojarumaru anime series that was released in Japan on July 15, 2000. The film was shown in conjunction with Mon Colle Knights the Movie: The Legendary Fire Dragon and The Mysterious Tatari-chan.

== Plot ==
The short film introduces Semira, a strange boy who comes to play with Ojarumaru and his chums and bears a marked resemblance to a boy of the same name who spent a summer with the village elders when they were boys, long ago.

== Cast ==
- Hiroko Konishi - Ojarumaru Sakanoue
- Rie Iwasubo - Denbo Sanjūrō
- Yuriko Fuchizaki - Kazuma Tamura
- Harumi Ikowa - Kintarō "Kin-chan" Sakata
- Masako Nozawa - Semira
- Kazuya Ichijō - Aobee
- Yuji Ueda - Kisuke
- Omi Minami - Akane
- Satomi Koorogi - Ai Tamura
- Toshiya Ueda - Tomio "Tommy" Tamura

== Home media ==
The film was released on VHS by Nippon Crown on November 22, 2000, in Japan. Nippon Crown later released the film on DVD on July 25, 2001.
