= Wobbuffet =

Pokémon species

- Pokémon character
- Wobbuffet artwork by Ken Sugimori
- First game: Pokémon Gold and Silver (1999)
- Designed by: Hironobu Yoshida; Ken Sugimori (finalized)
- Voiced by: English; Kayzie Rogers (2001–2017); Erica Schroeder (2017–2023); Japanese; Yūji Ueda

In-universe information
- Species: Pokémon
- Type: Psychic

Wobbuffet (/ˈwɑːbəfɛt/), known in Japan as Sonans (Japanese: ソーナンス), is a Pokémon species in Nintendo and Game Freak's Pokémon media franchise, and the evolved form of Wynaut. First introduced in the 1999 video games Pokémon Gold and Silver, it has since appeared in multiple games including Pokémon Go and the Pokémon Trading Card Game, as well as different pieces of merchandise. Wobbuffet is a major recurring character in the Pokémon TV series, belonging to the Team Rocket member Jessie, and has become the official fourth member of the group.

Classified as a Psychic-type Pokémon, featuring a blue body with a black tail. It is a primarily reactive Pokémon, able to do damage only in reaction to being attacked. It also prevents other Pokémon from fleeing battle due to an ability, which has resulted in their use in competitive Pokémon play becoming contentious. Its design is said to be based on a okiagari-koboshi doll, and its Japanese name is based on the rakugo comedian Sanpei Hayashiya I's catchphrase, "sō nansu, okusan". It has been generally well received, with praise given to its efficacy in combat and design. Its TV series appearance was particularly praised, with critics attributing its popularity to this appearance.

== Concept and creation ==
Wobbuffet is a species of fictional creatures called Pokémon created for the Pokémon media franchise. Developed by Game Freak and published by Nintendo, the Japanese franchise began in 1996 with the video games Pokémon Red and Green for the Game Boy, which were later released in North America as Pokémon Red and Blue in 1998. In these games and their sequels, the player assumes the role of a Trainer whose goal is to capture and use the creatures' special abilities to combat other Pokémon. Some Pokémon can transform into stronger species through a process called evolution via various means, such as exposure to specific items. Each Pokémon have one or two elemental types, which define its advantages and disadvantages when battling other Pokémon. A major goal in each game is to complete the Pokédex, a comprehensive Pokémon encyclopedia, by capturing, evolving, and trading with other Trainers to obtain individuals from all Pokémon species.

Wobbuffet was first introduced in Pokémon Gold and Silver. When developing the games, around 300 individual Pokémon designs were drafted by various development team members, with each deciding their names and features and revising the drafts as needed. During this process, the team actively tried to avoid vague design concepts, as they felt this had caused difficulty creating completed Pokémon during the development of Red and Blue. Once the team selected which Pokémon designs to include, the design was drawn and finalized by lead artist Ken Sugimori. Wobbuffet's original designer was Hironobu Yoshida. To maintain balance, many of the newer species did not appear in the early stages of the game. Additionally, many of the Pokémon were designed with merchandise in mind, taking into account the related Pokémon toy line and anime series. As a result, designs often had to be kept simplistic, something that caused strain for Sugimori and affected his approach with the next Pokémon franchise titles, Pokémon Ruby and Sapphire. Compared to the species introduced in the first generation, many of the second generation species have more obvious origins based on animals, plants, or myths; they were also designed with a rural Japanese influence due to a significant amount being based on animals known to live in a "temperate forest environment."

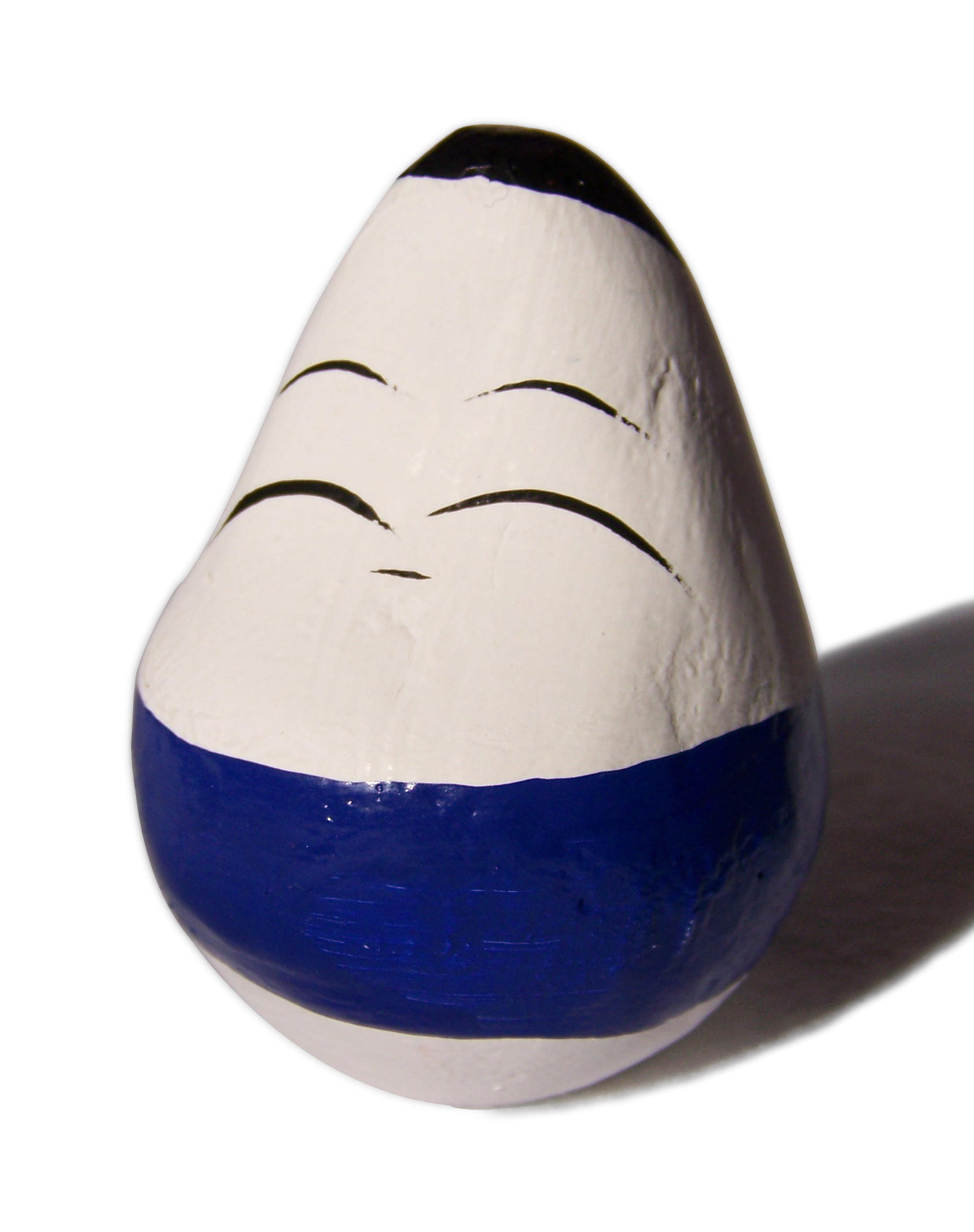
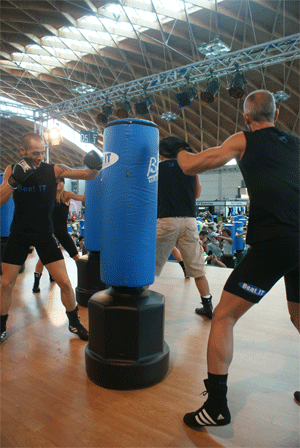
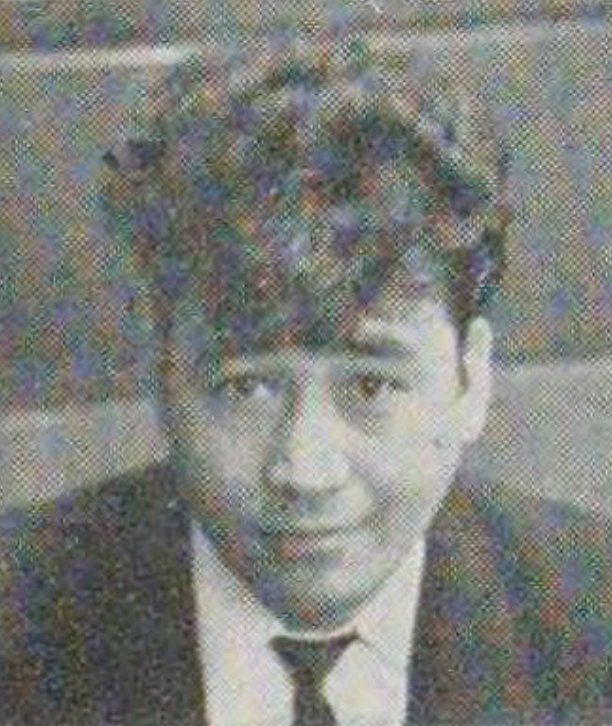
Wobbuffet is said to have multiple influences in its design, such as an okiagari-kobōshi doll (left), a punching bag (middle) and rakugo comedian Sanpei Hayashiya I (right).

Wobbuffet is a blue blob-like Pokémon, featuring closed eyes, and a black tail with eyes. Wobbuffet are highly protective of their tails; when the tail is attacked, its normally docile disposition is replaced by ferocious aggression, said to be proof that the tail "hides a secret". This design has multiple claimed origins, including being based on a punching bag and a okiagari-koboshi doll. Starting with Pokémon Diamond and Pearl, certain Pokémon have gender differences. Male Wobbuffet retain its original design, while female Wobbuffet gain lips resembling lipstick. Both male and female Wobbuffet have a "Shiny" variant that causes its body to be all pink besides the tail. It has the ability Shadow Tag, which prevents other Pokémon from fleeing a battle. It has no attacking moves in its moveset, using either Mirror Coat or Counter in battle. Both attacks do retributive damage, with Mirror Coat working if Wobbuffet is damaged by a special attack, while Counter works if hit by a physical attack. It is the only fully evolved Pokémon that is unable to be taught moves by items called "Technical Machines". The games Pokémon Ruby and Sapphire introduced a "Baby" form of Wobbuffet called Wynaut. Its Japanese name is Sonans, which is based on the catchphrase of rakugo comedian Sanpei Hayashiya "sō nansu, okusan", which translates to "That's the way it is, ma'am". Wobbuffet also shares the quirk of holding a limb to its head like a salute, similar to Hayashiya. Wynaut's Japanese is "Sohnano", which is meant to sound like "really?" in Japanese, serving as a response to Wobbuffet's name. Whilst the interplay between their names was retained in Korean and Chinese releases, it was not retained in the English localization. The English name is a combination of buffet and wobble, a reference to its ability to handle taking multiple hits. The name was chosen by English localizer Jeff Kalles.

It is voiced in Japanese by Yūji Ueda starting in the 1998 Pokémon TV series. In English, it was originally voiced by Kayzie Rogers and later by Erica Schroeder.

== Appearances ==
Wobbuffet first appeared in Pokémon Gold and Silver, originally a single-stage Pokémon. In the remakes HeartGold and SoulSilver, Wobbuffet again appears alongside its pre-evolution Wynaut, which was introduced in Pokémon Ruby and Sapphire. In 2006, an event was held at Pokémon Center stores across Japan that allowed players of Pokémon Ruby, Sapphire, and Emerald, as well as Pokémon FireRed, and LeafGreen, to obtain a free Wobbuffet. In Pokémon Platinum, a mini-game is featured focused on Wobbuffet. It has appeared in most mainline entries since. It became unavailable in Pokémon Scarlet and Violet. It has also appeared in the mobile game Pokémon Go, both in its regular form and a party hat variant. In Go, an outbreak of Pikachu encounters in Yokohama featured Wobbuffet, believed to be due to its apparent connection to Japanese culture. as well as the physical Pokémon Trading Card Game. Wobbuffet appears in multiple spin-offs, including the Pokémon Mystery Dungeon series, Pokémon Ranger series, and Pokémon Channel, where it hosts a game show. In 2006, a medal game called Wobbuffet Fell Down was created by Namco Bandai. It features several Pokémon attempting to cross a finish line without being seen by a Meowth; when successful, a Wobbuffet appears at the bottom of the screen. Outside the Pokémon series, a Wobbuffet appears as a summonable Pokémon in Super Smash Bros. Melee, bouncing back and forth when hit and damaging anyone it touches. A collectible trophy of Wobbuffet can also be obtained.

Wobbuffet appears in the Pokémon TV series. A member of the villain group Team Rocket, Jessie, unknowingly trades her Pokémon Lickitung for a Wobbuffet, only discovering it during battle when she sent it out, expecting it to be Lickitung. This Wobbuffet provides comic relief, and often appearing to either simply say its name or cause trouble for Team Rocket. It became the official fourth member of the group, after Jessie, James, and Meowth. While the team originally rode in a balloon based on Meowth, they rode a Wobbuffet-themed balloon for a time. In the Black & White season, Jessie does not include Wobbuffet in her team. It returns in Pokémon the Series: XY. In the first episode, Jessie almost defeats protagonist Ash Ketchum's Pikachu with it. In Team Rocket's final episode of Pokémon Journeys: The Series, the final season of the series, Wobbuffet and the others are reunited with many of the Pokémon Jessie and James had met over the series.

Wobbuffet has received multiple pieces of merchandise, including plushes, figures, McDonald's Happy Meal toy, and bath items. A merchandise line called "Everybody is Wobbuffet" was released, featuring Wobbuffet and other Pokémon, like Pikachu and Eevee, with its expression in various forms, including plushes, bags, a phone case, mug, and charms. It was also included in a set of plushes themed after the Pokémon Ditto.

== Reception ==
USgamer writer Caty McCarthy felt that Wobbuffet was a unique Pokémon among the earlier generations, stating that it was not a "creature born to fight, nor to defend" and that it "takes everything as it comes". She felt it important to have a very defensive Pokémon in her team, and that Wobbuffet did this well to help support her other team members. As part of their "Pokémon of the Day" series, IGN stated that, while it had a limited selection of moves, it can be an "absolute nightmare" to defeat without the right Pokémon on a person's team. Pocket Tactics writer Kayleigh Partleton similarly regarded it as a strong tank for use in battle, though noted that it was limited in usefulness due to a lack of speed and strength. She considered it among the best Pokémon from the second generation, praising its design and the ambiguity about whether its body was the tail or not. Despite any issues, she felt fond of Wobbuffet due to its role in the anime. Kevin Slackie and Moises Taveras from Paste similarly mentioned the theory regarding Wobbuffet's tail, describing that aspect as "an extra bit of weirdness" to what they already felt to be an awkward and off-looking design; however, the pair did praise its appearance in the anime as being "wonderfully comedic". Because of the theory, artist Christopher Stoll created art on what an anatomically realistic Wobbuffet could look like, with the blue body made of muscle and fat whilst the tail houses the brain and a sealed jaw. Darryn Bonthuys from GameSpot believed the design to be distressing due to resemblance of it being "a trapped face [with] no mouth on its tail", whereas GamesRadar+'s Hope Bellingham declaring that the art was "nightmare fuel".

Its competitive viability has also been discussed. TheGamer Chris Littlechild believed that Wobbuffet should be banned, stating that while he enjoyed having Pokémon that break the mold, Wobbuffet was "designed to be annoying", stating that its stats and moveset lend itself to not being fun in competitive play. In competitive play, Wobbuffets holding the item Leftovers, which heals some health every turn, have been banned to prevent trolling. It saw bans in competitive play, with GamesRadar writer Carolyn Gudmundson noting that a Wobbuffet vs. Wobbuffet fight effectively ended in a draw. Fellow TheGamer writer Andrew Scariati felt that its gimmick was among the most iconic, stating that how powerful it is depends on how well the player can predict their opponent's decisions. GamesRadar+ writer Michael Grimm stated that Wobbuffet was his favorite Pokémon of all time, stating that he came to love him before finding out how competitively viable he was.

Its role in the anime has been the subject of discussion by critics. Beckett Pokémon Unofficial Collector writer Alex Lucard attributed its popularity to its role in the anime, stating that it "never fails to provide comic relief." Dot Esports writer David Gealogo considered it an iconic Pokémon, stating that it was among the anime's most memorable Pokémon particularly due to how it says its name as Team Rocket is defeated. Nintendo World Report writer Matt West stated that, despite never having used Wobbuffet on his team, he considered it one of his favorite Pokémon. He attributed his love for it to the anime, particularly its "weird" behavior of appearing at inopportune times and saying its name. He was particularly enamored by it due to how powerful it was, citing its ability to reflect attacks, struggling only due to it and its owner's incompetence. He also praised its design, particularly its always-closed eyes and salute when it appears. He stated that Wobbuffet always made him laugh as a kid, and that he still finds him funny. The Mary Sue writer Sarah Fimm stated that, despite being one of the most memorable "running gags" in the anime, she never found it funny, adding that Wobbuffet never caused her to so much as smile. She felt that it was useless, never helping Team Rocket win a battle. She particularly felt that it took attention from Meowth as being Team Rocket's mascot, which she described as an "infinitely more iconic and likable character". She also felt that it was used as a "signal" that the writers were running out of ideas by the end of the episode, who she believed used it as a "reverse deux ex machina" to cause any advantage Team Rocket had to be invalidated.
