= Klefki =

Pokémon species

- Pokémon character
- Klefki artwork by Ken Sugimori
- First game: Pokémon X and Y (2013)
- Designed by: Mana Ibe

In-universe information
- Species: Pokémon
- Type: Steel and Fairy

Klefki (/ˈklɛfkiː/), known in Japan as Cleffy (Japanese: クレッフィ, Hepburn: Kureffi), is a Pokémon species in Nintendo and Game Freak's Pokémon franchise. It was designed by Pokémon graphic designer Mana Ibe and was inspired by old mansions and secret keys. Klefki was introduced in Pokémon X and Y and is a Steel and Fairy Pokémon known for collecting keys. A short film about Klefki called Pikachu, What's This Key For? premiered as an opener for Pokémon the Movie: Diancie and the Cocoon of Destruction.

Klefki received a mostly negative reception, though it gained the most attention among generation VI Pokémon prior to release. While multiple critics felt that it was poorly designed, other critics praised Klefki, defending it and other Pokémon based around inanimate objects. Critics also discussed how nostalgia impacts people's perception of Pokémon, citing Magnemite from Pokémon Red and Blue in comparison to Klefki. Klefki was also a popular Pokémon in the competitive scene of Pokémon X and Y.

== Concept and design ==
Klefki is a species of fictional creatures called Pokémon created for the Pokémon media franchise. Developed by Game Freak and published by Nintendo, the Japanese franchise began in 1996 with the video games Pokémon Red and Green for the Game Boy, which were later released in North America as Pokémon Red and Blue in 1998. In these games and their sequels, the player assumes the role of a Trainer whose goal is to capture and use the creatures' special abilities to combat other Pokémon. Each Pokémon has one or two elemental types, which define its advantages and disadvantages when battling other Pokémon. A major goal in each game is to complete the Pokédex, a comprehensive Pokémon encyclopedia, by capturing, evolving, and trading with other Trainers to obtain individuals from all Pokémon species.

Classified as a Steel- and Fairy-type Pokémon and standing eight inches tall, Klefki resembles a key ring with four keys dangling off it, having two eyes and a keyhole-shaped mouth in the middle. A pink appendage hangs beneath the center of its body. Klefki was designed by Mana Ibe, a graphic designer whose initial idea derived from the history of Kalos—the fictional region that Pokémon X and Y is set in. From there, they were inspired to add "story elements to a key design," basing the design off of old mansions and secret keys. Character designer Ken Sugimori felt that Klefki exemplified the "variety and richness" of Pokémon species designs due to being based on an inanimate object such as a key ring.

== Appearances ==
Klefki first appeared in Pokémon X and Y before other future mainline titles, including Pokémon Sword and Shield and Pokémon Scarlet and Violet. It was added to the mobile game Pokémon Go in 2020, in which it was exclusively obtainable in France. Fans discovered that Klefki could also be obtained in areas geographically near France, including parts of England, Germany, Spain, and Italy, due to how the developer Niantic designed the spawn area.

Klefki made a debut in the Pokémon anime in the short film Pikachu, What's This Key?, where it used its keys to help Pikachu and his friends visit several worlds. Another Klefki appears in the anime episode "Dreaming a Performer's Dream!", entrusted to keep a key safe from the character Monsieur Pierre.

== Reception ==
Klefki's design received mixed reception. Writer Imran Khan of Fanbyte identified it as the go-to example of issues with modern Pokémon designs. Video game journalists regarded its design as among the worst of new Pokémon introduced in X and Y, characterizing the design as uninspired, insipid, strange, and an example of Game Freak's "creative bankruptcy". (Note: Attributed to multiple sources) VentureBeat staff felt unsurprised by the concept behind the Pokémon, arguing that the team had run out of ideas. It has also been regarded as one of the worst Pokémon overall, with IGN readers voting Klefki as one of the worst Pokémon from Pokémon X and Y. Hayes Madsen of Screen Rant claimed that Klefki should have never been made, deriding it for being based on an object.

Official artwork of Magnemite, which was frequently compared to Klefki because it similarly consists of everyday objects.

Kotaku writer Zack Zwiezen initially assumed Klefki was a fake design due to its strange premise. He discussed how people differentiate modern Pokémon designs from classic ones, namely how a common criticism is that classic designs were "all-natural looking creatures." Refuting this claim, he stated that an earlier design in the series, Magnemite, was "just screws and magnets." However, he also wrote that Klefki's premise may indicate that the designers were out of ideas and needed to take a break. Fanbyte writer James O'Connor similarly cited Magnemite as an example of early Pokémon designs being strange but still found Klefki unsettling despite the precedence of similar designs. VGC's Jordan Middler, Chris Scullion, and Andy Robinson discussed Klefki in their podcast, citing its design as an example of Pokémon's lack of design creativity as more games are released. Other critics were more positive, with many other authors regarding it as one of their favorite Pokémon.

However, some praised Klefki for being based on an object. Kotaku's Patricia Hernandez noted that while some people dislike "inanimate objects that are somehow Pokémon", she defended it by saying its "ridiculous" concept made it noteworthy and may be based on the Japanese mythological tsukumogami. TheGamer writer Sergio Solorzano suggested that people may be more okay with Pokémon like Magnemite than they are with Klefki because of nostalgia. He argued in favor of object-based Pokémon and appreciated that Steel-type Pokémon were getting more creative.

Despite early assumptions that Klefki would be a weak Pokémon, Klefki was significant in the Pokémon X and Y competitive scene, among the game's top Pokémon in part for being a "solid support wall." Klefki's high placement was due to multiple factors, including its innate special ability, Prankster, and its access to certain status-affecting and support moves. Additionally, both of Klefki's types gave it valuable defensive utility. In Pojo's Unofficial Big Book of Pokemon, the author says Klefki was a solid lead in battles, but it was a better fit for a support role in double battles. VG247 writer Cassandra Khaw was disappointed that the "sloppily-designed" species was advantageous competitively.
