= Kayzie Rogers =

Retired American voice actress

- Other name: Jamie Peacock
- Occupation: Voice actress
- Years active: 1987–2017

Kayzie Rogers (also credited as Jamie Peacock) is a retired American voice actress. She is known for her work in anime, commercials, and video games and is known in voicing the characters in the Pokémon universe.

== Career ==
Rogers has worked extensively for the Pokémon anime franchise. She has also voiced many characters, including Jessie's Wobbuffet, a role that she had voiced for 16 years, from 2001 to 2017.

Rogers retired from acting in 2017.

== Filmography ==
=== Anime ===
- Gall Force: Enternal Story - Rumy
- Here is Greenwood – Reina Kisaragi (CPM dub)
- Kirby: Right Back at Ya! – Tuff, Lady Like, Hana (Mrs. Mayor), Honey, Vee, Princess Rona
- Magical DoReMi – Todd, Miss Shannon
- Now and Then, Here and There – Sara Ringwalt
- One Piece (4Kids Entertainment edit) – Koby, Alvida, Miss Groundhog Day
- Ping Pong Club – Kamiya, Softball Player
- Pokémon – Max (Season 9), Cyndaquil, Totodile, Taillow, Marshtomp, Corsola, Lotad, Azurill, Marill, Eevee, Swinub, Wobbuffet, Axew, Mime Jr., Mr. Mime
- G.I. Joe: Sigma Six – Baroness
- Tai Chi Chasers – Elder Komorka
- Tama and Friends – Doozle, Pimmy, Mrs. Buxton, Casey's Mom
- Yu-Gi-Oh! Duel Monsters - Duke Girl B

=== Animation ===
- Chaotic – Takinom
- Funky Cops – Marge
- I Spy – Additional voices
- Regal Academy – Grandmother Rapunzel
- Teenage Mutant Ninja Turtles – Mrs. Morrison
- Winx Club (4Kids Entertainment) – Vanessa

=== Movies ===
- Gall Force: Eternal Story – Rumy
- Jungle Emperor Leo – Stork
- Impy's Island – Peg
- Impy's Wonderland – Peg
- Pokémon film series – Wobbuffet, Marill, Max
- Ten Plus Two (10+2): The Big Secret – Infinity

=== Web series/shorts ===
- Disney's World of English – Gymnast, Huey, Dewey and Louie
- Zippy and His Friends – Buster, Coco, Joey
- Play Along With Me – Bunny
- Skyshapers – Sam Scudley, Gredius, Mookie
- This Modern World – Hillary Clinton, various voices

=== Video games ===
- Bullet Witch – Various voices
- Pokémon Channel - Azumarill
- Valkyrie Profile - Frei

=== Live action ===
- Late Night with David Letterman – Remote: "Kayzie Teaches Dave and Barbara a Lesson"
- Dr. Atkins New Diet Revolution (Infomercial)- Spokesperson
