= Ojarumaru =

Japanese anime television series

- おじゃる丸
- Genre: Comedy, Fantasy, Slice of life
- Created by: Rin Inumaru
- Developed by: Rin Inumaru (seasons 1-4)
- Directed by: Akitaro Daichi
- Music by: Harukichi Yamamoto
- Country of origin: Japan
- Original language: Japanese
- No. of seasons: 29 (Note: As used officially by NHK.)
- No. of episodes: 2187 + 8 specials (Note: As of December 2, 2025.) (list of episodes)

Production
- Animator: Gallop (Note: Credited as Studio Gallop until 2001.)
- Production company: NHK

Original release
- Network: NHK Educational TV
- Release: October 5, 1998 – present

Related
- Film
- Ojarumaru the Movie: The Promised Summer - Ojaru and Semira
- Manga
- Written by: Tatsuma Ejiri
- Published by: Shueisha
- Magazine: Saikyo Jump
- Original run: January 2012 – September 2014
- Volumes: 1

Ojarumaru (おじゃる丸), known officially in English as Prince Mackaroo, is a Japanese anime series created by Rin Inumaru, produced by NHK and NHK Enterprises, and animated by Gallop. The series has aired on NHK Educational TV since October 1998, making it the second longest-running anime on NHK behind Nintama Rantaro, and the third longest-running anime series to date. The series focuses on a five-year-old Heian-era prince named Ojarumaru Sakanoue who accidentally time-warps to modern Japan and has adventures there while dodging a trio of young oni who try to get back a scepter that he stole from Great King Enma. The series has been dubbed in many languages. It was the first NHK anime series to be animated using the digital ink-and-paint process instead of cel animation.

It received an "Excellence Award" for animation at the 1999 Japan Media Arts Festival.

== Premise ==
Around 1,000 years ago in Fairy World (妖精界 Yōsei-kai) in the Heian era, (Note: Officially written in katakana as ヘイアンチョウ (Heian-chō)) a young prince from a noble family named Ojarumaru Sakanoue is bored of his life of privilege. He is later lured into Enma World (エンマ界 Enma-kai) by the sound of a ukulele played by Great King Enma. Upon arriving, he steals Great King Enma's powerful scepter, (Note: Officially written in katakana as シャク (Shaku)) which he uses in order to judge the dead. While getting chased by Great King Enma, he accidentally falls into the Moon Hole (月の穴 Tsuki no Ana), which time-warps him to modern Japan via the Full Moon Road (満月ロード Mangetsu Rōdo). The furious Great King Enma sends his three adopted oni children, Aobei, Kisuke, and Akane, who are known as the "Little Child Trio" (子鬼トリオ Kooni Trio), to pursue Ojarumaru and get the scepter back. At the present time, Ojarumaru falls from the Moon to the roof of Sakata Apartment (坂田マンション Sakata Manshon) where he befriends a boy named Kazuma Tamura and his grandfather Tommy. Fascinated with the prince, Tommy helps Kazuma convince his parents Ai and Makoto into letting Ojarumaru stay with the family, to which they accept. Denbo, Ojarumaru's anthropomorphic firefly caretaker who witnessed the latter falling into the Moon Hole, eventually finds and takes care of him at the request of his parents. While making many new friends and rivals, as well as dodging the Oni Child Trio's efforts to retrieve the scepter, Ojarumaru has many adventures in Moonlight Town (月光町 Gekkō-chō) and encounters new things he has never seen before in his time period.

Later episodes tend to center around other characters, including Princess Okame, Ojarumaru's young fiancé who desperately tries to win over his heart; Okorinbō and Nikorinbō, two anthropomorphic komainu who try numerous get-rich-quick methods in a bid to get their shinto shrine out of poverty; Ken, a freeter who keeps changing jobs; Kazuma's classmates, big eater Kintarō Sakata, beauty-obsessed Komachi Ono, and the judgmental but well-intentioned Kentarō Iwashimizu; Icchoku Honda, Kazuma's energetic homeroom teacher; the Hoshino Family, three aliens from another planet who want to invade Earth and have a strange aversion to Ojarumaru; and Sachiyo Usui, an eccentric manga artist who is notorious for her creepy, highly detailed drawings.

Some episodes place the characters in parodies of notable fairy tales, fables, novels, and TV shows from Japan and other countries. These include Momotarō, Cinderella, Ikkyū-san, Journey to the West, Columbo, Peter Pan, The Boy Who Cried Wolf, Attack on Titan and James Bond.

== Broadcast ==
Seven television specials have aired on NHK E-Tele. The first special entitled Ojarumaru: Shiawase no Aoi Senaka (おじゃる丸 しあわせの青いせなか, Ojarumaru: A Happy Blue Back) aired on January 1, 2000. The second special entitled Ojarumaru: Mangetsu Rōdo Kiki Ippatsu ~Tama ni wa Maro mo Dai Bōken~ (おじゃる丸 満月ロード危機一髪 ～タマにはマロも大冒険～, Ojarumaru: Peril at the Full Moon Road ~A Rare Adventure of Our Prince~) aired on May 3, 2007. The third special entitled Ojarumaru Supesharu: Ginga ga Maro o Yonde iru ~Futari no Negai Boshi~ (おじゃる丸スペシャル 銀河がマロを呼んでいる ～ふたりのねがい星～, Ojarumaru Special: My Galaxy Is Calling ~The Two Wishing Stars~) aired on March 20, 2012. The fourth special entitled Ojarumaru Special: Wasureta Mori no Hinata (おじゃる丸 スペシャル わすれた森のヒナタ, Ojarumaru Special: Hinata in the Forgotten Forest) aired on August 14, 2015. The fifth special entitled Ojarumaru Special: Saraba Mattari no Hibi yo (おじゃる丸 スペシャル さらば まったりの日々よ, Ojarumaru Special: Goodbye, Lazy Days) aired in 2 parts on November 1 and 2, 2017. The sixth special entitled Ojarumaru Special: Anime Janai de ojaru? (おじゃる丸 スペシャル アニメでないでおじゃる？, Ojarumaru Special: It's Not an Anime?) aired on November 3, 2017. The seventh special Heian-chō Onigami Kessen (ヘイアンチョウ鬼神決戦) was scheduled to premiere on March 28, 2022, and was later delayed to March 30 due to a high school baseball tournament preempting the special's initial 9:00 AM timeslot on March 28.

The series has aired daily on Kids Station since November 5, 2018.

== Soundtrack ==
=== Opening Themes ===
No.	Title	Series no.	Performer	Notes
1	Utahito (詠人)	1–10; 16-present	Saburō Kitajima	
2	Yumehito (夢人)	11–15	Saburō Kitajima	

=== Ending Themes ===
No.	Title	Series no.	Performer	Notes
1	Purin Sanka (プリン賛歌, The Pudding Anthem)	1	SUS4	
2	Purin de ojaru (プリンでおじゃる)	2	Ojarumaru (Hiroko Konishi), Kazuma (Yuriko Fuchizaki), Denbo (Rie Iwatsubo)	A cover of Purin Sanka
3	Kooni Trio no Theme (子鬼トリオのテーマ, The Little Oni Trio's Theme)	3	Kooni Trio (Note: Consists of Aobei (Kazuya Ichijou), Akane (Omi Minami), and Kisuke (Yūji Ueda))	
4	Koi o Itashi Mashou♪ (恋をいたしましょう♪, Let us Love♪)	4	Denbo	
5	Acchi Muite Hoi de ojaru (あっちむいてホイでおじゃる)	5	Ojarumaru (Chinami Nishimura), Kazuma, Denbo, the Oni Child Trio	
6	Kono Machi Itsumo 〜Bin-chan no Uta〜 (この町いつも〜貧ちゃんの歌〜, Always in this Town 〜Poverty-chan's Song〜)	6	Bin-chan (Ayaka Saitō)	
7	Warera Gekkō-chō Chicchai Mono Club (われら月光町ちっちゃいものクラブ, Our Moonlight Town Tiny Things Club)	7	Moonlight Town Tiny Things Club (Note: Consists of Denbo (Rie Iwatsubo), Kame and Tome (Satomi Kōrogi), Katapi (Ryō Naitō), Ojarumaru (Chinami Nishimura), and Bin-chan (Ayaka Saitō))	
8	Gekkō-chō no Uta (月光町のうた, Moonlight Town's Song)	8	Ojarumaru, Kisuke	
9	Denbo no Bunbun Fushi (電ボのブンブン節, Denbo's Buzzing Melody)	9	Denbo (Narumi Satō), Ojarumaru, Kazuma	
10	Sankyukkyu Dancing (さんきゅっきゅダンシング)	10	Natsumi	
11	Bokura no Sekai (ぼくらの世界, Our World)	11	Reiko Mizumachi	
12	Ojarumaru Kyōsō Kyoku (おじゃる丸狂騒曲, The Ojarumaru Prosperous Song)	12	Kumiko Mori	
13	Katatsumuri (かたつむり, Snails)	13	Manami Oku (Note: Credited as Manami Ogu)	
14	Hatsukoi wa Minora Nai (初恋は実らない, Not My First Love)	14	Ojarumaru Sisters	
15	Maro no Sanpo (マロのさんぽ, My Walk)	15, 16	Chopiiin (15th series); Ojarumaru, Kazuma, Denbo (16th series)	
16	Da!Da!!Da!!!	17	The Collectors	
17	Wakaran (わからん, I Don't Know)	18	Zainichi Funk	
18	Mihatenu Yume (見果てぬ夢, An Unfinished Dream)	19	Ojamens (Note: Consists of Kanchō (Kenjirō Tsuda), Kanbutsu (Eiji Takemoto), Ken (Yūsuke Numata), Kawakami (Norihisa Mori), and Hoshino (Yuko Sanpei))	
19	Purin Sanka ~20th à la mode edition (プリン賛歌 ~20th à la mode edition, The Pudding Anthem ~20th à la mode edition)	20	TWEEDEES	A cover of Purin Sanka
20	Kono Michi Ashita e (この道 明日へ)	21	Ken	
21	Yada na～ Ii na～ (やだな～ いいな～)	22	Great King Enma (Tetsuo Komura), Bin-chan	
22	Yume no Yume (夢の夢, Dream in a Dream)	23	Crazy Ken Band	
23	Oja Fuwa Babyun (おじゃフワバビュン)	24	Fuwa-chan, Team Ojarumaru	
24	Ito Okashi (いとをかし)	25	Ringo Sheena	
25	Sennen Traveler (千年トラベラー, Thousand-Year Traveler)	26	Ikusaburo Yamazaki	
26	Maru (丸)	27	Shizuka Kudo	
27	Go! de Ojaru (Go!でおじゃる)	28	Hiromi Go	
28	Tabi de gonzansu Ojarumaru (旅でござんす おじゃる丸, It's a Journey, Ojarumaru) (Note: "De gonzansu" (でござんす) is an archaic colloquial variant of the copula, "de gozaimasu" (でございます), meaning "to be". The copula evokes Edo period culture, particularly wandering gamblers within the context of the ending theme.)	29	Kiyoshi Hikawa	

== Other media ==
=== Manga ===
A manga adaptation of the anime series, written and illustrated by Tatsuma Ejiri, was serialized in Shueisha's Saikyo Jump magazine from January 2012 to September 2014. The first and only tankōbon volume, which compiles select stories from the Saikyo Jump serialization, was published in Japan on July 4, 2014.

No.	Release date	ISBN
1	July 4, 2014	4088801474
1. "I am Ojarumaru" (マロがおじゃる丸でおじゃる, "Maro ga Ojarumaru de ojaru"); 2. "My Ojaru Livelihood" (マロのおじゃる生活でおじゃる, "Maro no Ojaru Seikatsu de ojaru"); 3. "Sightseeing Moonlight Town" (月光町観光するでおじゃる, "Gekkō Chō Kankō Suru de ojaru"); 4. "I'm Homesick" (ホームシックでおじゃる, "Hōmushikku de ojaru"); 5. "I Hate Baths and Water" (風呂や水はイヤでおじゃる, "Furo ya Mizu wa Iya de ojaru"); 6. "Kin-chan is a Dinosaur Mania" (金ちゃんは恐竜マニア, "Kin-chan wa Kyōryū Mania"); 7. "My Cap is a Treasure Chest (マロのエボシは宝ばこ, "Maro no Eboshi wa Takarabako"); 8. "Kazuma Likes Rocks Very Much" (カズマはとっても石がすき, "Kazuma wa Tottemo Ishi ga Suki"); 9. "Crazy for Komachi-chan" (小町ちゃんにメロリンコ, "Komachi-chan ni Merorinko"); 10. "Iwashimizu-kun is Always Correct" (いつも正しい石清水くん, "Itsumo Tadashii Iwashimizu-kun"); 11. "Grandpa Tommy's Great Discovery" (トミー爺の大発見, "Tomī-jī no Daihakken"); 12. "Kazuma, Afraid of Rocks (カズマ、石をこわがる, "Kazuma, Ishi o Kowagaru"); Special Bonus: "Cafe Oko-Niko" (カフェ オコニコ, "Kafe Oko-Niko")

=== Video games ===
Title	Developer	Publisher	Platform	Release date	Source
Ojarumaru (おじゃる丸)	Bandai	Bandai	Sega Pico	1999	
Ojarumaru 〜Mangan Jinja no Ennichi de ojaru!〜 (おじゃる丸 〜満願神社の縁日でごじゃる!〜)	MTO	MTO	Game Boy Color	June 30, 2000	
Ojarumaru 〜Tsukiyo ga Ike no Takaramono〜 (おじゃる丸 〜月夜が池のたからもの〜)	Success	Success	Game Boy Color	July 14, 2000	
Typing Ojarumaru (タイピング おじゃる丸)	Interchannel	Interchannel	Windows 95/98/Me/XP	2001	
Ojarumaru: Kazu Asobi (おじゃる丸 かずあそび)	E Frontier	E Frontier	Windows 95/98/2000/Me/XP, Classic Mac OS, macOS	2002	
Ojarumaru: Moji Asobi (おじゃる丸 もじあそび)	E Frontier	E Frontier	Windows 95/98/2000/Me/XP, Classic Mac OS, macOS	2002	
Ojarumaru: Pasokon Yarou yo! Mouse de Jigsaw Puzzle (おじゃる丸 パソコンやろうよ! マウスでジグソーパズル)	Dorasu	Dorasu	Windows 95/98/2000/Me		
Ojarumaru: Gekkō-chō Sanpo de ojaru (おじゃる丸 月光町 散歩でおじゃる)	MTO	MTO	Game Boy Advance	September 5, 2003	
Ojarumaru: DS Ojaru to Okeiko Aiueo (おじゃる丸 DS おじゃるとおけいこ あいうえお)	D3 Publisher	D3 Publisher	Nintendo DS	December 20, 2007	
Ojarumaru: Kaikai! Enma-Kai (おじゃる丸 怪々！エンマ界)	Metro	Metro	au		
Ojarumaru: Gattai no Oni (おじゃる丸 がったいのオニ)	Metro	Metro	au		
Ojarumaru: Ojarumaru Tennis (おじゃる丸 おじゃる丸テニス)	Metro	Metro	au		
Ojarumaru: Eboshi Collection (おじゃる丸 エボシコレクション)	Metro	Metro	au		
Ojarumaru: Ojarumaru no Hover Race (おじゃる丸 おじゃる丸のホバーレース)	Metro	Metro	au		
Ojarumaru: Chicchai Golf (おじゃる丸 ちっちゃいゴルフ)	Metro	Metro	au		
Ojarumaru: Nige tetamo (おじゃる丸 にげてたも)	Metro	Metro	au		
Ojarumaru: Logic Puzzle (おじゃる丸 ロジックパズル)	Metro	Metro	au		
Ojarumaru: Shutsudō! Chicchai Mono Club (おじゃる丸 出動!ちっちゃいものクラブ)	Metro	Metro	au		
Akihabara Ojaru de Kankō (秋葉原おじゃるde観光)	Akihabara TMO, INC.	Akihabara TMO, INC.	iOS, Android	2011	

== See also ==
- Gag Manga Biyori
- Nintama Rantaro
- Doraemon
- Sazae-san
