= Master Quest =

Master Quest may refer to:

- Pokémon: Master Quest, the 5th season of Pokémon
- The Legend of Zelda: Ocarina of Time Master Quest
