= Pokémon: The Johto Journeys =

Third season of the Pokémon animated television series

- Season 3
- English front cover of the Pokémon: The Johto Journeys DVD collection box called "A Brand New World", containing the first three episodes of this season
- No. of episodes: 41

Release
- Original network: TV Tokyo
- Original release: October 14, 1999 – July 27, 2000

Season chronology
- ← Previous; Adventures in the Orange Islands Next → Johto League Champions

Pokémon: The Johto Journeys is the third season of the Pokémon anime series and the first season of Pokémon the Series: Gold and Silver, known in Japan as Pocket Monsters (ポケットモンスター, Poketto Monsutā). (Note: For the DVD release, the title was changed to Pocket Monsters: Episode Gold & Silver (ポケットモンスター 金銀編, Poketto Monsutā: Kin Gin Hen)) It originally aired in Japan from October 14, 1999, to July 27, 2000, on TV Tokyo, and in the United States from October 14, 2000, to August 11, 2001, on The WB/Kids' WB.

The season follows Ash Ketchum as he travels across the Johto region to challenge its Pokémon League while joined by Misty and Brock.

The episodes were directed by Masamitsu Hidaka and produced by the animation studio OLM.

In 2000, during the show's run in the United States, it was ranked as the number 1 program among boys 2–11 years old.

== Episode list ==
Jap. overall	Eng. overall	No. in season	English title Japanese title	Original release date	English air date
119	117	1	"Don't Touch That 'dile" (Wakaba Town! Where the Winds of a New Beginning Blow!); Transliteration: "Wakaba Taun! Hajimari o Tsugeru Kaze ga Fuku Machi!" (Japanese: ワカバタウン! はじまりをつげるかぜのふくまち!)	October 14, 1999	October 14, 2000
Ash, Brock, and Misty arrives in New Bark Town to register for the Johto League, but their efforts hit a snag when Team Rocket kidnaps Totodile, a Johto Water-type Starter Pokémon.
120	118	2	"The Double Trouble Header" (The Rookie's Chicorita!); Transliteration: "Rūkī no Chikorīta!" (Japanese: ルーキーのチコリータ!)	October 21, 1999	October 21, 2000
Heading to Violet City for the first gym, Ash and company meet Casey, a new trainer and baseball fan who eagerly challenges Ash to a battle. When Ash easily beats all three of her Pokémon with just his Charizard, she gets upset and makes an alliance with Team Rocket to get back at Ash, until she finds out that Team Rocket was just using her.
121	119	3	"A Sappy Ending" (Crash! Heracros vs. Kailios!!); Transliteration: "Gekitotsu! Herakurosu Tai Kairosu!!" (Japanese: げきとつ! へラクロスVSカイロス!!)	October 28, 1999	October 28, 2000
Heading towards Violet City, Ash and company see some Heracross. Eager to get one, Ash disturbs them and gets told off by an expert. He tells about how Heracross and Pinsir are at war due to something disturbing their tree sap flow. Later, Heracross expresses his desire to come with Ash and thus Ash captures Heracross.
122	120	4	"Roll On, Pokémon!" (Donfan's Valley!); Transliteration: "Donfan no Tani!" (Japanese: ドンファンのたに!)	November 4, 1999	November 4, 2000
Ash encounters a Donphan and wants to capture it, thinking it's wild, but finds out it is owned by Rochelle, a Trainer who is looking for Amberite. Team Rocket however wants to get the Amberite and steal Donphan.
123	121	5	"Illusion Confusion!" (Hoho and the Mysterious Forest!); Transliteration: "Hōhō to Ayashii Mori!" (Japanese: ホーホーとあやしいもり!)	November 11, 1999	November 4, 2000
Heading into a forest which is inhabited by a ghost Pokémon, Ash and company get tricked by illusions, but Gary tells them to see through them by getting a Hoothoot. Ash goes to get one and when he finds the rental place, he discovers the Hoothoot he can rent is a rowdy one.
124	122	6	"Flower Power" (Kireihana's Battle Dancing!); Transliteration: "Kireihana no Batoru Danshingu!" (Japanese: キレイハナのバトルダンシング!)	November 18, 1999	November 11, 2000
In the city of Florando, Ash and company come across a trainer called Bailey, who is trying to participate in a contest with her two Bellossom, but they just can't get their rhythm right. Ash decides to try to help them out.
125	123	7	"Spinarak Attack" (Itomaru! Big Police Investigation!!); Transliteration: "Itomaru! Dai Sōsasen!!" (Japanese: イトマル! だいそうさせん!!)	November 25, 1999	November 11, 2000
In Catallia City, Ash and company see Officer Jenny who has a Spinarak to help her solve crimes. Knowing Ash and company as the trainers who helped her sister in New Bark Town, Officer Jenny asks them for their help in solving some crimes that bear a resemblance to the crimes of the Black Arachnid, a figure who eight generations before had been known for being a legendary thief and for Meowth that assisted him in his crimes.
126	124	8	"Snubbull Snobbery" (Bull's Magnificent Life!?); Transliteration: "Burū no Karei na Seikatsu!?" (Japanese: ブルーのかれいなせいかつ!?)	December 2, 1999	November 18, 2000
Ash and company find a Snubbull clinging to a Growlithe's tail. They decide to find the owner of the Snubbull and return it, but when the Snubbull goes missing again, they have to get it.
127	125	9	"The Little Big Horn" (Odoshishi! Forest of Illusions!?); Transliteration: "Odoshishi! Maboroshi no Mori!?" (Japanese: オドシシ！まぼろしのもり!?)	December 9, 1999	November 18, 2000
When a town keeps getting attacked by a herd of Stantler, Brock thinks there is something awry. Standing up against them, he finds it is an illusion made by an injured baby Stantler who needs help.
128	126	10	"The Chikorita Rescue" (The Stubborn Chicorita!!); Transliteration: "Ijippari no Chikorīta!!" (Japanese: いじっぱりのチコリータ!!)	December 16, 1999	November 25, 2000
Heading to Violet City Gym, Ash comes across a Johto Grass-type Starter Pokémon Chikorita and battles it. But when it is hurt in battle, he rushes it to the Pokémon Center only to find Team Rocket are wanting that Chikorita for themselves. Chikorita becomes Ash's newest Pokémon in the end.
129	127	11	"Once in a Blue Moon" (Nuoh and the GS Ball!?); Transliteration: "Nuō to GS Bōru!?" (Japanese: ヌオーとGSボール!?)	December 23, 1999	December 2, 2000
While polishing the GS Ball in Cherrygrove City, Ash soon finds that a Quagsire has stolen it! Trying to get it back, he gets arrested for interfering in the Quagsire Festival where the Quagsire take round things and send them upstream, where the last object to be returned gives good luck to its owner.
130	128	12	"The Whistle Stop" (Rediba's Flute!); Transliteration: "Rediba no Fue!" (Japanese: レディバのふえ!)	January 1, 2000	December 2, 2000
In a forest, Ash meets a girl called Arielle and her group of Ledyba who tend the gardens and follow Arielle's whistle. However in a battle with Team Rocket, all the Ledyba dispel and it's up to Ash and company to find them.
131	129	13	"Ignorance is Blissey" (Happinas's Happy Nurse!); Transliteration: "Hapinasu no Happī Nāsu!" (Japanese: ハピナスのハッピーナース!)	January 6, 2000	December 9, 2000
At the Happy Town Pokémon Center, Ash and company discover a Blissey, the evolved form of Chansey. While relaxing, Ash keeps getting hurt by Blissey accidentally, but Team Rocket soon arrives, and since the Blissey is an old friend of Jessie, Jessie regrets accepting food from her.
132	130	14	"A Bout with Sprout" (Big Pinch! Madatsubomi Tower!); Transliteration: "Dai Pinchi! Madatsubomi no Tō!" (Japanese: だいピンチ! マダツボミのとう!)	January 13, 2000	December 16, 2000
Ash and co. finally arrive at Violet City, where they find a school and he gets asked to give a small talk about Pokémon Training to the kids. However, a kid called Zackie is convinced that Ash's Pikachu is to be his, and when Pikachu runs off, he takes chase with one of Ash's empty Pokéballs.
133	131	15	"Fighting Flyer with Fire" (Kikyou Gym! Sky Battle!!); Transliteration: "Kikyō Jimu! Ōzora no Tatakai!!" (Japanese: キキョウジム! おおぞらのたたかい!!)	January 20, 2000	December 16, 2000
Ash arrives at the Violet City Gym and begins his campaign of earning eight gym badges to qualify for the Johto League by taking on the Violet City Gym Leader, Falkner but Ash soon discovers that Falkner's a force to be reckoned with due to Falkner's Pokémon overwhelming Ash's. Ash soon realizes that he needs to come up with some kind of strategy instead of his usual approach of brutal force if he's to stand any chance of winning his first gym badge.
134	132	16	"For Crying Out Loud" (Crybaby Maril!); Transliteration: "Nakimushi Mariru!" (Japanese: なきむしマリル!)	January 27, 2000	January 20, 2001
When a crybaby Marill is washed away by a river following a failed attempt by Team Rocket to steal it, Misty tries returning the Marill to its trainer, Wilhomena.
135	133	17	"Tanks a Lot!" (Pasture! Otachi & Togepy!!); Transliteration: "Bakusō! Otachi Ando Togepī!!" (Japanese: ばくそう! オタチ&トゲピー!!)	February 3, 2000	January 27, 2001
Team Rocket's new super vehicle, the Arbo-tank, is their ticket to world domination. That is, until Togepi and its new-found buddy, Sentret, climb inside and accidentally wreak havoc on everything in their path.
136	134	18	"Charizard's Burning Ambitions" (Lizardon's Valley! Until We Meet Again!!); Transliteration: "Rizādon no Tani! Mata Au Hi made!!" (Japanese: リザードンのたに! またあうひまで!!)	February 10, 2000	February 3, 2001
When Ash hears of the Charicific Valley, he is sure a trip there will boost his Charizard's spirits, but when they reach the valley, they find its Charizard denizens are anything but cordial. In the end, Ash sadily leaves Charizard in the valley to train.
137	135	19	"Grin to Win!" (Big Panic! Kimawari Contest!!); Transliteration: "Dai Panikku! Kimawari Kontesuto!!" (Japanese: だいパニック! キマワリコンテスト!!)	February 17, 2000	February 10, 2001
The annual Sunflora contest is only a day away, but Ash and company's new friend, the Sunflora trainer Sonrisa, is unable to convince her star Pokémon to compete.
138	136	20	"Chikorita's Big Upset" (Chicorita's Jealousy!?); Transliteration: "Chikorīta wa Gokigen Naname!?" (Japanese: チコリータはごきげんななめ!?)	February 24, 2000	January 20, 2001
A severe case of sibling rivalry between Pikachu and Chikorita calls for therapy sessions with Nurse Joy. In such delicate matters, there's no such thing as an overnight cure, or is there?
139	137	21	"Foul Weather Friends" (Hanecco's Jealousy! Big Prairie Battle!!); Transliteration: "Hanekko Haneta! Daisōgen no Tatakai!!" (Japanese: ハネッコはねた! だいそうげんのたたかい!!)	March 2, 2000	February 10, 2001
Ash and his friends chance upon a Hoppip, a fluffy Pokémon that is able to catch passing winds and drift for miles through the sky. The Hoppip's trainer Mariah uses a group of Hoppip to help her forecast the weather. One of the Hoppip is actually a little Oddish.
140	138	22	"The Superhero Secret" (Mysterious Superhero! Gligerman Appears!!); Transliteration: "Nazo no Sūpāhīrō! Guraigāman Tōjō!!" (Japanese: なぞのスーパーヒーロー! グライガーマンとうじょう!!)	March 9, 2000	February 17, 2001
The legendary Gligarman is getting too old to fight crime. When Ash and friends wander into town, they bring with them a challenge that threatens to be Gligarman's last: Team Rocket.
141	139	23	"Mild 'n Wooly" (Merriep Meadow's Girl); Transliteration: "Merīpu to Makiba no Shōjo" (Japanese: メリープとまきばのしょうじょ)	March 16, 2000	February 17, 2001
Team Rocket comes in sheep's clothing to relieve a kind Mareep-herder of her flock. Ash and friends are eager to help, but will first have to convince the Mareep trainer to have faith in herself.
142	140	24	"Wired for Battle!" (Let's Battle! Hassam vs. Heracros!!); Transliteration: "Batoru Shiyō ze! Hassamu Tai Herakurosu!!" (Japanese: バトルしようぜ! ハッサムVSヘラクロス!!)	March 23, 2000	February 24, 2001
When Shingo, a promising trainee at a Pokémon battle dojo abandons battle altogether, it is up to Ash and friends to convince him that battling, and life for that matter, is more than just a matter of probability.
143	141	25	"Good 'Quil Hunting" (Hinoarashi! I Got It!!); Transliteration: "Hinoarashi! Getto da ze!!" (Japanese: ヒノアラシ! ゲットだぜ!!)	March 30, 2000	March 3, 2001
With no fire Pokémon to call his own, Ash is overjoyed to find a Johto Fire-type Starter Pokémon Cyndaquil in the wild. But before Ash can capture the little Pokémon, he'll have to face another Trainer with similar desires and less scruples as well as Team Rocket and their Giant Robotic Meowth-inator.
144	142	26	"A Shadow of a Drought" (Hiwada Town! Yadon's Well!!); Transliteration: "Hiwada Taun! Yadon no Ido!!" (Japanese: ヒワダタウン! ヤドンのいど!!)	April 6, 2000	March 3, 2001
Ash carelessly makes enemies of the Slowpoke-worshipping residents of Azalea Town, but sees a chance at redemption when Team Rocket arrives to capture these revered Pokémon.
145	143	27	"Going Apricorn!" (Kunugidama and the Bonguri Fruit! Backyard Battle!!); Transliteration: "Kunugidama to Bonguri no Mi! Urayama no Tatakai!!" (Japanese: クヌギダマとボングリのみ! うらやまのたたかい!!)	April 13, 2000	March 10, 2001
Ash delivers the mysterious GS Ball to renowned Pokémon expert Kurt, but Team Rocket threatens the entire operation when they attempt to harvest the Apricorn resources essential to Pokéball Production. Also Brock catches a Pineco with a fastball made by Kurt.
146	144	28	"Gettin' the Bugs Out" (Hiwada Gym! Forest Battlefield!!); Transliteration: "Hiwada Jimu! Mori no Batoru Fīrudo!!" (Japanese: ヒワダジム! もりのバトルフィールド!!)	April 20, 2000	March 17, 2001
When Ash reaches the Azalea Town Gym, he has just the Pokémon to challenge the Gym Leader Bugsy's Bug Pokémon. But what will happen when Ash's Cyndaquil can't get its burners going?
147	145	29	"A Farfetch'd Tale" (Ubame's Forest! Search for Kamonegi!!); Transliteration: "Ubame no Mori! Kamonegi o Sagase!!" (Japanese: ウバメのもり! カモネギをさがせ!!)	April 27, 2000	March 17, 2001
After the inexperienced young trainer Sylvester mistakenly scares off his own Farfetch'd, Ash and friends are happy to help, but can they find it before Team Rocket can get their hands on this savory Pokémon?
148	146	30	"Tricks of the Trade" (Sonans and the Pokémon Exchange!!); Transliteration: "Sōnansu to Pokemon Kōkankai!!" (Japanese: ソーナンスとポケモンこうかんかい!!)	May 4, 2000	March 24, 2001
At the Pokémon Swap Meet in Palmpona, Ash and his friends befriend Benny, a young trainer who is having difficulties finding a trading partner willing to accept his Wobbuffet. In the end, Jessie accidentally trades her Lickitung for Benny's Wobbuffet and learns about Wobbuffet's Counter move.
149	147	31	"The Fire-ing Squad!" (Burning Zenigame Squad! Like a Fire!!); Transliteration: "Moero Zenigame-dan! Honō no Yō ni!!" (Japanese: もえろゼニガメだん! ほのおのように!!)	May 11, 2000	April 21, 2001
An unexpected Pokémon fire-fighting competition reunites Ash with a group of fire fighters from the Orange Islands called Team Wartortle. In the end, Ash's Squirtle returns to the Squirtle Squad.
150	148	32	"No Big Woop!" (Full of Upah!); Transliteration: "Upā ga Ippai!" (Japanese: ウパーがいっぱい!)	May 18, 2000	March 31, 2001
Ash and friends enthusiastically volunteer to watch over a school of Wooper while their trainer Olesia is away, but as always Team Rocket interferes, this time hoping to use the Wooper to pacify Giovanni.
151	149	33	"Tunnel Vision" (Purin vs. Bull!); Transliteration: "Purin Tai Burū!" (Japanese: プリンVSブルー!)	May 25, 2000	April 7, 2001
When a Snubbull and Jigglypuff get into a great disagreement, they threaten to draw everyone else into their conflict.
152	150	34	"Hour of the Houndour" (Dark Pokémon – Delvil); Transliteration: "Dāku Pokemon, Derubiru" (Japanese: ダークポケモン・デルビル)	June 1, 2000	April 14, 2001
Investigating a string of mysterious thefts, Ash and his friends discover a pack of Houndour, struggling to survive in the wild. In order to help mend their ways, Ash will have to earn their trust first.
153	151	35	"The Totodile Duel" (Whose Waninoko is It!? Satoshi vs. Kasumi!); Transliteration: "Waninoko wa Dare no Mono!? Satoshi Tai Kasumi!" (Japanese: ワニノコはだれのもの!? サトシVSカスミ!)	June 8, 2000	May 5, 2001
Ash and Misty engage in a fierce three-on-three Pokémon battle when the two of them attempt to capture a wild Totodile, during which Misty's Poliwag evolves.
154	152	36	"Hot Matches!" (Airmd vs. Hinoarashi! Wings of Steel!!); Transliteration: "Eamūdo Tai Hinoarashi! Hagane no Tsubasa!!" (Japanese: エアムードVSヒノアラシ! はがねのつばさ!!)	June 15, 2000	May 12, 2001
Ash faces Miki, a young female trainer who possess an unbeatable Skarmory, a Steel-type bird. To win, Ash and his Cyndaquil must undergo intense training if they're to have any hope of beating Skarmory.
155	153	37	"Love, Totodile Style" (Dance, Waninoko! The Step of Love!!); Transliteration: "Odore Waninoko! Ai no Suteppu o!!" (Japanese: おどれワニノコ! あいのステップを!!)	June 22, 2000	May 26, 2001
Ash's Totodile falls in love with Azumarill but Totodile isn't successful in confessing its feelings to Azumarill. But when Team Rocket kidnaps Azumarill, it falls to Totodile to save the day.
156	154	38	"Fowl Play!" (Different-Colored Yorunozuku! I Got It!!); Transliteration: "Irochigai no Yorunozuku! Getto da ze!!" (Japanese: いろちがいのヨルノズク! ゲットだぜ!!)	June 29, 2000	April 28, 2001
Ash has his sights set on a rare and brightly colored Noctowl, but Team Rocket interferes and tries to take the Noctowl for themselves.
157	155	39	"Forest Grumps" (Ringuma's Startling!!); Transliteration: "Ringuma de Dokkiri!!" (Japanese: リングマでドッキリ!!)	July 6, 2000	June 2, 2001
An Ursaring attack forces Ash and his friends to team up with Team Rocket, members of each team being paired with members of the other; Misty ends up with James and Meowth, and Jessie ends up with Ash and Brock.
158	156	40	"The Psychic Sidekicks!" (Kirinriki! The Village of Esper Pokémon!); Transliteration: "Kirinriki! Esupā Pokemon no Mura!" (Japanese: キリンリキ! エスパーポケモンのむら!)	July 13, 2000	August 11, 2001
Team Rocket attacks Len Town, a town that is protected by Psychic Pokémon with a machine that is impervious to Psychic attacks, and begins to steal all the Pokémon in town.
159	157	41	"The Fortune Hunters" (Pokémon Fortune-telling!? Enormous Melee!); Transliteration: "Pokemon Uranai!? Dairansen!" (Japanese: ポケモンうらない!? だいらんせん!)	July 27, 2000	May 19, 2001
A Pokémon Fortune Telling boom turns out to be a Team Rocket plot to steal Pokémon from local trainers.

== Music ==
The Japanese opening song is "OK!" by Rica Matsumoto for 41 episodes. The ending songs are "Meowth's Party" (ニャースのパーティ, Nyasu No Pāti) by Nyasu / Meowth (Inuko Inuyama), for 25 episodes, Rikako Aikawa and Chorus performed "Exciting Pokémon Relay" (ポケモンはらはらリレー, Pokémon Hara Hara Rirē) for 10 episodes, and "Exciting² Pokémon Relay (Hard Version)" (ポケモンはらはら²リレー むずかし版, Pokémon Hara Hara² Rirē Muzukashi Ban) for 5 episodes, "Takeshi's Paradise (タケシのパラダイス, Takeshi no Paradaisu) by Takeshi \ Brock (Yūji Ueda) for one episode, and the English opening song is "Pokémon Johto" by the musical group called Johto. Its short version serves as the end credit song. The ending songs at the end of each episode are "You & Me & Pokémon" for 9 episodes, and "Pikachu (I Choose You)" for 8 episodes by Élan Rivera and the musical group called Johto, "Song of Jigglypuff" by Rachael Lillis as Jigglypuff and the musical group called Johto for 8 episodes, "All We Wanna Do" by Élan Rivera and the musical group called Johto for 8 episodes, and "Two Perfect Girls" by Eric Stuart as Brock for 8 episodes from Pokémon Karaokémon.

== Home media ==
In the United States, the season was released in 13 volumes on VHS and DVD by Viz Video and Pioneer Entertainment. The last two episodes: "The Psychic Sidekicks!" and "The Fortune Hunters" were not shown on these sets.

Viz Media and Warner Home Video released Pokémon: The Johto Journeys – The Complete Collection on DVD in the United States on November 10, 2015.
