= Pokémon: Battle Frontier =

Ninth season of the Pokémon animated television series

- Season 9
- English front cover of the complete Pokémon: Battle Frontier DVD collection box
- No. of episodes: 47

Release
- Original network: TV Tokyo
- Original release: October 6, 2005 – September 14, 2006

Season chronology
- ← Previous; Advanced Battle Next → Diamond and Pearl

Pokémon: Battle Frontier is the ninth season of the Pokémon anime series and the fourth and final season of Pokémon the Series: Ruby and Sapphire, known in Japan as Pocket Monsters: Advanced Generation (ポケットモンスター アドバンスジェネレーション, Poketto Monsutā Adobansu Jenerēshon). It originally aired in Japan from October 6, 2005, to September 14, 2006, on TV Tokyo, and in the United States from January 20, to July 14, 2007, on Cartoon Network.

The season follows Ash Ketchum as he continues travels across the Kanto region to challenge Frontier Brains with Brock, May, and Max.

The episodes were directed by Masamitsu Hidaka and Norihiko Sudo, and were produced by the animation studio OLM.

This is the first season of Pokémon to be localized into English by Pokémon USA after 4Kids Entertainment's contract was not renewed.

== Episode list ==
Jap. overall	Eng. overall	No. in season	English title Japanese title	Original release date	English air date
422	418	1	"Fear Factor Phony" (Esper vs. Ghost! Midnight Duel!?); Transliteration: "Esupā Tai Gōsuto! Mayonaka no Kettō!?" (Japanese: エスパーVSゴースト！真夜中の決闘！？)	October 6, 2005	January 20, 2007
Ash and friends Brock, May and Max arrive in a ghost town where Psychic-type Pokémon are playing music and dancing to it in a mansion. The Ghost-type Pokémon in the town don't like this and decide to stop it, during which Jessie's Wobbuffet falls in love with a Kirlia. Ash and the others help the Psychic and the Ghost Pokémon get along with each other so they can live peacefully.
423	419	2	"Sweet Baby James" (Manene Appears! Mansion of Rest!); Transliteration: "Manene Tōjō! Kyūsoku no Yakata!" (Japanese: マネネ登場！休息の館！)	October 13, 2005	January 27, 2007
May discovers that her Munchlax is sick after it refuses to eat. An elderly couple run into them and offer to help cure Munchlax, taking the group back to their cottage. James' Chimecho falls ill as well and, seeing a castle in the distance, rushes there. The castle turns out to be James' wealthy grandparents' cottage, where Ash and his friends are. Despite James' pleas, Jessie and Meowth decide to steal all the Pokémon in the garden while the others are taking care of Chimecho and Munchlax. Afterward, James is forced to leave Chimecho behind so it can recover and the Mime Jr. staying at his grandparents' cottage that got attached to James happily jumped into one of James' PokéBalls, and let itself be caught.
424	420	3	"A Chip Off the Old Brock" (Mizugorou and Mokoko! Wonder Drug of Love!?); Transliteration: "Mizugorō to Mokoko! Koi no Tokkōyaku!?" (Japanese: ミズゴロウとモココ！恋の特効薬！？)	October 20, 2005	February 3, 2007
During a training battle against Ash's Grovyle, Brock's Mudkip evolves into a Marshtomp, who injures a nearby Flaaffy after learning Mud Shot. Now Ash and friends must go with Flaaffy's trainer, Mariah, to her grandmother Katie's pharmacy to heal the injured Flaaffy.
425	421	4	"Wheel of Frontier" (Battle Arena! Fighting Showdown!!); Transliteration: "Batoru Arīna! Kakutō Taiketsu!!" (Japanese: バトルアリーナ！格闘対決！！)	October 27, 2005	February 3, 2007
Arriving at the Battle Arena, Ash challenges Arena Tycoon Greta to a match. Learning that Greta favors using her Hariyama and Medicham, Ash recalls a friend from Professor Oak to help him win the Guts Symbol - his Snorlax. Ash battles Greta using Grovyle and Snorlax; will Ash pull out a win?
426	422	5	"May's Egg-cellent Adventure!" (The Breeding Center and the Pokémon Egg!); Transliteration: "Sodateyasan to Pokemon no Tamago!" (Japanese: そだて屋さんとポケモンのタマゴ！)	November 3, 2005	February 10, 2007
After winning the Guts Symbol at the Battle Arena, Ash's next challenge is the Battle Dome. On their way, they came across a Breeding Center with lots of Pokémon eggs. May meets Nicolette, a girl who resents her because May is a Coordinator and she isn't. When Team Rocket attacks and steals all the Pokémon eggs, the two must put their differences aside and save the eggs. While delivering the final blow against Team Rocket, Pikachu's Quick Attack transforms to a ultra powerful Volt Tackle, blasting Team Rocket off yet again. In the end, May receives an egg as a thank-you for saving the eggs.
427	423	6	"Weekend Warrior" (The Rival is a Salaryman!?); Transliteration: "Raibaru wa Sararīman!?" (Japanese: ライバルはサラリーマン！？)	November 10, 2005	February 17, 2007
May arrives in Silver Town (Note: A Kanto town unrelated to Johto League Silver Conference.) for her second Pokémon Contest. As the contest begins a guy named Jeremy enters the contest much to his wife and son's protest. Jeremy tries to tell his wife why he loves contests but she doesn't want to listen so May steps in to help Jeremy. As the final round arrives, it is a battle between May and Jeremy.
428	424	7	"On Olden Pond" (The Lake of Hakuryu!); Transliteration: "Hakuryū no Mizuumi!" (Japanese: ハクリューの湖！)	November 17, 2005	February 17, 2007
On the way to the Battle Dome, Ash and the others decide to stop at a famous fishing spot for the day. However, the lake is deserted. They find out from the owner of a fishing house, Tiffany, that a company owned by Saridakis wants to buy the lake and turn the land into a resort. In order to scare people away from the land so Tiffany and her Grandma get no business, Saridakis uses his Crawdaunt to terrorize the lake. When Tiffany finds out, she challenges him to a battle. The next day Ash prepares to fight Saridakis for the future of the lake.
429	425	8	"Tactics Theatrics!!" (Battle Dome! Fusion of Fire and Water!!); Transliteration: "Batoru Dōmu! Honō to Mizu no Fyūjon!!" (Japanese: バトルドーム！炎と水のフュージョン！！)	November 24, 2005	February 24, 2007
Ash finally arrives at the Battle Dome, and challenges Dome Ace Tucker to a match, who is also a star in that city. The battle begins with Ash using his Swellow and Corphish against Tucker's Arcanine and Swampert, During the battle, Tucker gains the upper hand by using combination attacks of his two Pokémon. Ash learns how to combine his Pokémon's attacks and effectively uses their power to hand a stunning defeat to Tucker, earning Ash his third Frontier Symbol, the Tactics Symbol.
430	426	9	"Reversing the Charges" (Startling! Frightening! Elekid!!); Transliteration: "Dokkiri! Bikkuri! Erekiddo!!" (Japanese: ドッキリ！ビックリ！エレキッド！！)	December 1, 2005	February 24, 2007
On their way to the next Battle Frontier location, the Battle Pike, Ash and friends encounter an angry Elekid who attacks any Pokémon in his way. After it attacks Ash, Brock, May and Max, May's egg becomes stuck in Elekid's horns and it runs off. Team Rocket encounters the same Elekid and gets separated from Mime Jr. Brock discovers that the Elekid has absorbed the electricity from nearby lightning storms and suggests that Pikachu do the same so that the two can battle to drain Elekid's energy. During Pikachu and Elekid's battle, Team Rocket intervenes and James sees that Mime Jr. is with May, and May sees that her egg is with James. After they swap, Team Rocket continue with trying to steal Pikachu and Elekid. Phanpy battles Team Rocket, and Elekid with Pikachu's combined power destroys Team Rocket's mech and Elekid calms down. Team Rocket attack Phanpy but the battle causes Phanpy to evolve into Donphan, who blasts Team Rocket away with a most powerful Hyper Beam.
431	427	10	"The Green Guardian" (Pokémon Ranger Appears! Celebi Rescue Operation!!); Transliteration: "Pokemon Renjā Tōjō! Serebyi Kyūshutsu Sakusen!!" (Japanese: ポケモンレンジャー登場！セレビィ救出作戦！！)	December 8, 2005	March 3, 2007
A lightning storm causes a forest fire, endangering all the Pokémon of the forest. The Legendary Pokémon Celebi appears to stop the fire and saves the Pokémon. Seeing a falling tree about to hit it, it teleports away to a different time and hides by creating vines around it. On their way to the Battle Pike, Ash and friends decide to ride along Cycling Road. However, it is closed and they take a detour through the forest below. After hearing a noise, Pikachu runs off into the forest and finds the injured Celebi under some thick vines. Trying to find Pikachu, Ash and the others run into Solana, a Pokémon Ranger who agrees to help them find Pikachu. Solana uses her capture styler to temporarily capture wild Pokémon to help with travelling through the forest. While searching for Pikachu, the group finds Team Rocket stuck in some vines and frees them and then run off. When they finally find Pikachu and Celebi, the reunion is short-lived as Team Rocket attacks, wanting to capture Celebi for themselves! After a short battle and a successful Volt Tackle from Pikachu, the group defeats Team Rocket but their robot causes another fire. Celebi again stops the fire and then returns to its own time.
432	428	11	"From Cradle to Save" (Usohachi and the Ninja School!!); Transliteration: "Usohachi to Ninja Sukūru!!" (Japanese: ウソハチと忍者スクール！！)	December 15, 2005	March 10, 2007
While training Pikachu and Donphan, Ash and friends discover Evian, a student of a nearby Ninja School, spying on them. Arriving at the Ninja School, they learn from the teacher Angela that there is a thief causing a lot of robberies in the area. During their various lessons at the school they meet a wild Bonsly who cries a lot and doesn't get along with the other Pokémon at the school. Everyone at the school suspects Bonsly as the culprit behind all the crime, but Brock defends it and takes care of it, as it is still a baby. Team Rocket appears and tries to capture all of the Pokémon at the school. After taking care of Team Rocket, Brock battles and captures the Bonsly so that he can look after it.
433	429	12	"Time-Warp Heals All Wounds" (Haruka Travels Through Time!!); Transliteration: "Toki o Koeru Haruka!!" (Japanese: 時を超えるハルカ！！)	December 22, 2005	March 10, 2007
Ash and friends have arrived at Fuchsia City for Ash's fourth Battle Frontier battle, but May's Squirtle seems to have vanished. The frightened May arrives at an abandoned train station, where May meets an old woman holding her Squirtle, named Edna, who has not been able to comprehend her husband 's death a long time ago. May learns from Edna's granddaughter, Katrina, that her husband, Jonathan, left Edna to study in a different city. One year later, Edna received a letter notifying her of Jonathan's death after which Edna fell into a deep denial and regret, and is always waiting at the train station every day to wait for Jonathan. Squirtle runs away again, and May finds it with Meowth, who felt depressed after overhearing Edna's story. They find Edna's pendant which contained the power to rewrite the past, allowing Jonathan to live in the present. After returning to the Pokémon Center, Edna and Jonathan help May with her egg, which hatches into an Eevee.
434	430	13	"Queen of the Serpentine!" (Fierce Fighting at The Battle Tube! Vs. Tube Queen Azami!!); Transliteration: "Nettō Batoru Chūbu! Tai Chūbu Kuīn Azami!!" (Japanese: 熱闘バトルチューブ！VSチューブクイーン・アザミ！！)	January 5, 2006	March 17, 2006
Ash finally arrives at the location of the Battle Pike ready to battle. Team Rocket tricks him into coming into their own fake Battle Pike where they capture Pikachu. With the help of the real Frontier Brain, Pike Queen Lucy, they save Pikachu, and Ash challenges Lucy to a battle. Lucy accepts due to her affection for Brock, but Ash realizes Lucy is no pushover. Can Ash win? And who will Brock cheer for?
435	431	14	"Off the Unbeaten Path" (Who Single Handedly Has the Victory!? Pokémon Orienteering!!); Transliteration: "Yūshō wa Dare no Te ni!? Pokemon Orientēringu!!" (Japanese: 優勝は誰の手に！？ポケモンオリエンテーリング！！)	January 12, 2006	March 17, 2007
On their way to the Battle Palace, Ash and friends stop at Potpourri Island where they learn about the Pokémon Orienteering Contest. The contest is a race around the island where a trainer and one Pokémon must go to five different locations and get the special stamps at those locations. The winner will receive a special medal along with a ton of fruit. As the contest begins, Ash goes with Pikachu, May with Eevee, Brock with Bonsly, Max with Munchlax, James with Mime Jr, and Jessie with Meowth. Who will win the contest and win all that fruit? That is if Jessie and Meowth don't succeed in stealing it along with Ash, May, and Brock's Pokémon!
436	432	15	"Harley Rides Again" (Gonbe's Battle Debut! Harley and Taking the Game Seriously!!); Transliteration: "Gonbe no Debyūsen! Hārī to Shinken Shōbu!!" (Japanese: ゴンベのデビュー戦！ハーリーと真剣勝負！！)	January 19, 2006	March 24, 2007
Ash and friends finally arrive in Wisteria Town where May prepares for her next contest. Harley shows up, but is not so friendly, declaring that he will win this contest and his fourth Ribbon. Team Rocket tries to convince Harley to work with them to help beat May and get Pikachu but he just calls them losers and leaves. In the contest, both May and Harley manage to breeze through the appeals and battles and end up facing each other, Munchlax against Octillery. Meanwhile, Team Rocket decides to get revenge on Harley. After the contest, May receives a letter and a rose from an anonymous sender, who everyone assumes is Drew.
437	433	16	"Odd Pokémon Out!" (Juptile vs. Tropius! Grassland Duel!!); Transliteration: "Juputoru Tai Toropiusu! Sōgen no Kettō!!" (Japanese: ジュプトルVSトロピウス！草原の決闘！！)	January 26, 2006	March 31, 2007
Heading for the next Pokémon Contest, Ash and his friends encounter a Meganium owned by a Nurse Joy and a Tropius who is in love in it. However, Grovyle has become smitten with the Meganium as well, and seeks to beat the Tropius. When Team Rocket intervenes, Grovyle evolves into Sceptile but it loses the ability to use any of its attacks due to his unrequited love for Meganium, who teams up with Tropius to get rid of Team Rocket.
438	434	17	"Spontaneous Combusken!" (Pokémon Contest! Yuzuriha Tournament!!); Transliteration: "Pokemon Kontesuto! Yuzuriha Taikai!!" (Japanese: ポケモンコンテスト！ユズリハ大会！！)	February 2, 2006	April 7, 2007
After losing a ribbon to Harley, May arrives on Chrysanthemum Island ready to win her third Ribbon. Ash is also working hard trying to help Sceptile regain its ability to use attacks. When Drew shows up, May finds out the anonymous letter and rose was not from him. Later while training on the beach, she meets a girl named Brianna who reveals that she is a huge fan of May and she sent the letter and rose to May. When Brianna finds out May knows Drew, she freaks out as she has a crush on Drew. When she finally meets Drew, Brianna claims that she will beat May in the contest and win Drew's respect and love! Meanwhile, Jessie also enters the contest with James' Mime Jr. Despite losing to May, Brianna remains May's fan and friend, vowing to tell Drew how she feels when she wins her next ribbon.
439	435	18	"Cutting the Ties That Bind!" (Jukain! Dawn of Revival!!); Transliteration: "Jukain! Fukkatsu no Yoake!!" (Japanese: ジュカイン！復活の夜明け！！)	February 9, 2006	April 7, 2007
Ash and friends have finally arrived on Metallica Island, the location of the Battle Palace. Before challenging the Frontier Brain, Ash does a little training hoping to boost Sceptile's confidence. However, Sceptile still can't muster the strength needed to use attacks and runs into the woods frustrated. Ash and Pikachu run after Sceptile but once they get in the woods, they are attacked by a swarm of Beedrill and all three of them are knocked into the river. Ash manages to save Sceptile, but Pikachu is swept away downriver. When Scott appears at the Pokémon Center, he reveals to the others that this is the time of year when the Kakuna evolve and Beedrill will attack anything to protect them. They all leave to rescue Ash and his Pokémon. Ash and Sceptile manage to get out of the river and take a rest for the night. Elsewhere, Pikachu also manages to get out of the river but collapses from exhaustion. An old man riding a Venusaur finds Pikachu and helps him. Scott and the others find Pikachu and the old man, who is revealed by Scott to be the Frontier Brain of the Battle Palace, Palace Maven Spenser. The next day, Ash and Sceptile continue to search for Pikachu, when Ash trips over a bump on the path and injures himself. Suddenly, they come across hundreds of Kakuna when swarms of Beedrill surround them and begin attacking them. Can Ash and Sceptile find Pikachu and more importantly get out of the woods alive?
440	436	19	"Ka Boom with a View!" (Fierce Fighting! Jungle Battle at the Battle Palace!!); Transliteration: "Gekitō! Batoru Paresu de Janguru Batoru!!" (Japanese: 激闘！バトルパレスでジャングルバトル！！)	February 16, 2006	April 13, 2007
Ash finally arrives at Battle Palace, ready to take on Palace Maven Spencer for the Spirit Symbol. As they head out to the battlefield Ash learns that he has the entire surrounding jungle to battle in! As the battle begins, May, Brock, and Max head up in a balloon with Scott to watch the battle. As the battle begins, Ash puts his newly revived Sceptile against Spencer's Shiftry and the battle quickly takes into the forest. Will Ash manages to be able to beat Spencer while battling in a forest? And does he have a secret weapon waiting in the wings?
441	437	20	"King and Queen for a Day!" (Usohachi King and Manene Queen!?); Transliteration: "Usohachi Kingu to Manene Kuīn!?" (Japanese: ウソハチキングとマネネクイーン！？)	February 23, 2006	April 13, 2007
On their way to the Battle Tower, Ash and friends arrive in a town back on the mainland of Kanto. Then, Team Rocket (in disguise) convinces them to get free massages, which they agree to get. It turns out to be a trap and a battle ensues between Sceptile and Dustox (with the help of Munchlax's metronome) that destroys the tent and separates Pikachu, Bonsly, Meowth, and Mime Jr. from everybody else! The four of them land in the middle of the city, and are chased around by a bunch of guys in black suits. They manage to lose them and after helping a lady, Meowth manages to get some food for the four of them, but it is short lived as the men quickly find them again. It turns out that the men are chasing them because they are mistaking Bonsly and Mime Jr. for the famous Pokémon stars, King Bonsly and Queen Mime Jr. Jessie and James manage to find them and Jessie manages to get Mime Jr. and Bonsly in the filming of the King and Queen's TV show!
442	438	21	"Curbing the Crimson Tide!" (The Red Lightning of Skyscrapers!); Transliteration: "Matenrō no Akai Inazuma!" (Japanese: 摩天楼の赤いイナズマ！)	March 2, 2006	April 21, 2007
In a dark alley in Commerce City, three kids come face to face with the mysterious "Red Lightning". One kid sends out his Poliwag only to have it beaten and scribbled on. Then, Ash and the others arrive in the same city. Nurse Joy tells them of Red Lightning and how he is unbeatable. While visiting a park, May's Squirtle runs off and is attacked by Red Lightning and is easily defeated. After following Red Lightning to a house on the top of a skyscraper, they find out it is just a Scizor that belongs to a little girl called Luna, who refuses to back down.
443	439	22	"What I Did for Love!" (Decisive Game! Haruka vs. Takeshi!!); Transliteration: "Ōichiban! Haruka Tai Takeshi!!" (Japanese: 大一番！ハルカVSタケシ！！)	March 9, 2006	April 21, 2007
May finally arrives in Gardenia Town ready to win her fourth Ribbon. She gains a nice surprise when she finds out the Eevee has learned Dig. While May prepares for the contest, Brock meets another Pokémon Breeder named Yuma. After seeing his Pokémon skills, she convinces him to enter the Gardenia Contest. After amazing appeals by Squirtle and Bonsly, both May and Brock make it to the battle rounds.
444	440	23	"Three Jynx and a Baby!" (Muchul and the Three Rougela Sisters!!); Transliteration: "Muchūru to Rūjura San-Shimai!!" (Japanese: ムチュールとルージュラ三姉妹！！)	March 16, 2006	April 28, 2007
On their way to the Battle Tower, May finds a Smoochum behind a bush. She tries to pick it up, only to be attacked by three Jynx, Smoochum's sisters. After a short battle Ash and the others leave and head for town. Soon after, Team Rocket take Smoochum and plan to make her a star. The Jynx then begin to attack the town and Ash and May hold them back before luring them to where Smoochum is. However, when they get there, Jessie has no intentions to give Smoochum back to her sisters!
445	441	24	"Talking a Good Game!" (Tower Tycoon, Lila Appears!); Transliteration: "Tawā Taikūn, Rira Tōjō!" (Japanese: タワータイクーン、リラ登場！)	March 23, 2006	April 28, 2007
Finally at the Battle Tower, Ash challenges Salon Maiden Anabel for an Ability Symbol. As the battle begins, Ash quickly falls behind as Anabel can speak to Pokémon through telepathy.
446	442	25	"Second Time's the Charm!" (Battle Tower! Telepathy Battle!!); Transliteration: "Batoru Tawā! Ishindenshin Batoru!!" (Japanese: バトルタワー！以心伝心バトル！！)	March 30, 2006	April 30, 2007
After losing his match with Anabel, Ash battles her again in a rematch. Just like last time Anabel uses her telepathy ability to fight. Even though Ash is at a disadvantage, he surprisingly does better than last time, even managing to win in the first round! After the match, Scott reveals that the final Frontier Battle is taking place just outside of Pewter City.
447	443	26	"Pokémon Ranger - Deoxys' Crisis! Part 1" (Pokémon Ranger! Deoxys Crisis!! [Part 1]); Transliteration: "Pokemon Renjā! Deokishisu, Kuraishisu!! (Zenpen)" (Japanese: ポケモンレンジャー！デオキシス・クライシス！！（前編）)	April 13, 2006	May 19, 2007
On their way to Pewter City, Ash and friends run into Pokémon Ranger Solana again. Solana thinks that a Deoxys is causing geo-magnetic problems, interfering with Pikachu, other Pokémon and anything electronic. Ash and the others go with her into a cave caused by a meteorite, and Team Rocket follows them wanting Deoxys for the boss. Deoxys possesses Meowth to communicate, and tells everyone that it is scared. After Max offers to help it, Deoxys runs off with both of them.
448	444	27	"Pokémon Ranger - Deoxys' Crisis! Part 2" (Pokémon Ranger! Deoxys Crisis!! [Part 2]); Transliteration: "Pokemon Renjā! Deokishisu, Kuraishisu!! (Kōhen)" (Japanese: ポケモンレンジャー！デオキシス・クライシス！！（後編）)	April 13, 2006	May 19, 2007
Ash and the others call a temporary truce with Jessie and James to get Max and Meowth back from Deoxys. Will they solve geo-magnetic problems and help Deoxys?
449	445	28	"All That Glitters is Not Golden!" (Usokkie! Gold Legend!?); Transliteration: "Usokkī! Ōgon Densetsu!?" (Japanese: ウソッキー！黄金伝説！？)	April 20, 2006	May 1, 2006
Ash and May bump into a golden Sudowoodo. May wants to catch it for her next Pokémon Contest, but it belongs to a boy named Keenan.
450	446	29	"New Plot, Odd Lot!" (Harley & Team Rocket! The Formation of the Villainous Alliance!?); Transliteration: "Hārī ando Roketto-dan! Akuyaku Dōmei Kessei!?" (Japanese: ハーリー&ロケット団！悪役同盟結成！？)	April 27, 2006	May 2, 2006
Finally in Mulberry Town, May learns that this is the last contest before the Kanto Grand Festival. May becomes nervous and begins to doubt herself, but this is quickly put to rest when Harley shows up bragging about his five ribbons. Harley finds Team Rocket outside planning Jessie's contest strategy. Harley decides to help Jessie, but only so May won't make it to the Kanto Grand Festival. Harley explains to Team Rocket that when he was young, a girl that looked exactly like May stole the last of his favorite lunch, and he vowed to get revenge. He gives Jessie Cacturne and Banette to use in the contest. As the appeal stage gets underway, Jessie takes an early lead and thanks to James, Meowth, and Harley's Ariados, May and Combusken are starting to slip up.
451	447	30	"Going for Choke!" (Haruka vs. Musashi! The Final Contest!); Transliteration: "Haruka Tai Musashi! Saigo no Kontesuto!!" (Japanese: ハルカVSムサシ！最後のコンテスト！！)	May 4, 2006	May 3, 2007
As the battle rounds for the Mulberry Contest begin, James and Meowth trick Ash, Brock, and Max into a huge metal box so that they can't cheer May on, in hopes that it will cause her to lose. Harley is more determined than ever to make sure May loses. May and Jessie easily breeze through the battle rounds. As the final round arrives, May sticks with her trusty Squirtle and Jessie stays with Harley's Banette.
452	448	31	"The Ole' Berate and Switch!" (Team Rocket Breakup!? Respective Roads!); Transliteration: "Roketto-dan Kaisan!? Sorezore no Michi!" (Japanese: ロケット団解散！？それぞれの道！)	May 11, 2006	May 7, 2007
Jessie, James and Meowth get into an argument and they decided to split up, with Jessie joining Butch, James joining Cassidy and Meowth going it alone.
453	449	32	"Grating Spaces!" (Takeshi & Satoshi! Defend Nibi Gym in a Tag Battle!!); Transliteration: "Takeshi Ando Satoshi! Taggu Batoru de Nibi Jimu o Mamore!!" (Japanese: タケシ&サトシ！タッグバトルでニビジムを守れ！！)	May 18, 2006	May 8, 2007
Team Rocket tricks Brock's parents into leaving the Pewter Gym, leaving Ash and Brock to defend it. So Ash and Brock battle two on two with Ash's Donphan and Brock's newly evolved Steelix vs. Team Rocket's Pokémon Charizard and Aggron. Delibird gives Jessie and James a Charizard and Aggron by accident and claims it back for Butch and Cassidy in the end.
454	450	33	"Battling the Enemy Within!" (Battle Pyramid! Vs. Regirock!!); Transliteration: "Batoru Piramiddo! Tai Rejirokku!!" (Japanese: バトルピラミッド！VSレジロック！！)	May 25, 2006	May 9, 2007
Ash and friends finally arrive at the Battle Pyramid. After they fall into some ancient ruins, Ash is possessed by the ancient evil King of Pokélantis when he touches an ancient orb. Using Ash's body and his powers, the King of Pokélantis tries to steal everyone's Pokémon! Pyramid King Brandon decides to stop him in a battle to save Ash and seal the King of Pokélantis on the orb.
455	451	34	"Slaking Kong!" (Miracle! Mountain of the Giant Kekking!!); Transliteration: "Kyōi! Kyodai Kekkingu no Yama!!" (Japanese: 驚異！巨大ケッキングの山！！)	June 8, 2006	May 10, 2007
On the way to Indigo Plateau for May's Kanto Grand Festival, a group of Aipom come by and steal Ash's hat and including May's ribbons! An old man comes by and tells them that local Aipom, Mankey, and Vigoroth have been stealing his berries and taking them up to the mountains. He also tells them that there is a rumor about a giant monster living in the mountains. They follow the Aipom into the mountains to a giant wooden fence. When the fence opens up, they run in and find out that it is really a Giant Slaking working with Team Rocket! They plan to use all the berries to make and sell Pokéblocks at the Kanto Grand Festival, and Jessie will use May's ribbons to compete! After being chased out of the Slaking's territory, Ash and Brock are separated from everybody else, along with the Aipom that stole Ash's hat.
456	452	35	"May, We Harley Drew'd Ya!" (Begin! Pokémon Contest – Grand Festival!!); Transliteration: "Kaimaku! Pokemon Kontesuto, Gurando Fesutibaru!!" (Japanese: 開幕！ポケモンコンテスト・グランドフェスティバル！！)	June 15, 2006	May 14, 2007
Ash and friends finally arrive at the Indigo Plateau for May's Kanto Grand Festival. Before the competition, excitement already unfolds as Aipom returns and steals everybody's hats. With the help of Drew and a Coordinator from Pewter City named Solidad, they manage to get everything back. After Drew leaves, Solidad tells May how she knows Drew and how much he talks about May. While this is going on, Brock and Max run into a cloaked figure that they suspect to be Harley. As the next day begins, May, Drew, and Solidad all pull off impressive performances, but everyone begins to wonder where Harley is. All of a sudden, Harley, dressed as May and calling himself Mayley, comes out for a Harley original appeal. As the first round ends, May, Drew, Harley, and Solidad all progress, however, Harley has set out to defeat all of them.
457	453	36	"Thinning the Hoard!" (Haruka vs. Harley! Stage On with a Double Battle!!); Transliteration: "Haruka Tai Hārī! Daburu Batoru de Sutēji On!!" (Japanese: ハルカVSハーリー！ダブルバトルでステージ・オン！！)	June 22, 2006	May 15, 2007
The Kanto Grand Festival continues with appeals as Drew shows off his new Absol. May, Harley, and Solidad also do great appeals and the four of them all make it into the Top 16, which are the battle rounds. In the first match, May has to battle Harley. She chooses Munchlax and Eevee while he uses Cacturne and his new Wigglytuff. Eevee and Munchlax easily take out Cacturne but Wigglytuff badly beats them back. After devising a perfect strategy, May wins. Soon after, Solidad and Drew beat their opponents. Now in the Top 8 May must face Drew! She selects Combusken and Squirtle and Drew picks Absol and Flygon.
458	454	37	"Channeling the Battle Zone!" (Haruka vs. Shū! The Final Battle!); Transliteration: "Haruka Tai Shū! Saigo no Tatakai!!" (Japanese: ハルカVSシュウ！最後の戦い！！)	June 29, 2006	May 16, 2007
As May and Drew continue their battle, Drew quickly gains a lead with a new combo move. As the battle progresses, May manages to finally defeat Flygon with Squirtle. However, her victory is soon spoiled as Absol quickly takes out Squirtle. Combusken and Absol continue to battle with neither side letting down. During the battle, Combusken learns the powerful Overheat and is able to strike back with amazing power, handing May a narrow victory. After the battle, Ash finally catches the troublesome Aipom in front of a crowd of onlookers, including Scott. May then finds herself up against Solidad and her amazing Pidgeot and Slowbro.
459	455	38	"Aipom and Circumstance!" (Aipom and the King!); Transliteration: "Eipamu to Ōsama!" (Japanese: エイパムと王様！)	July 6, 2006	May 17, 2007
While Ash and friends eat breakfast with their Pokémon, Aipom gets jealous when Ash suggests training with Pikachu and runs off with Ash's hat again. While chasing after Aipom, the four heroes arrive in a town on the day of an ancient tradition to determine their King. On this day, the townsfolk chase after a crown and whoever is wearing the crown at sunset gets to be king of the town for one year. However, the crown becomes stuck on Aipom's head as Ash and friends, Team Rocket and the townsfolk all chase after Aipom.
460	456	39	"Strategy Tomorrow – Comedy Tonight!" (Perap and the Pokémon Comedian!); Transliteration: "Perappu to Pokemon Manzai!" (Japanese: ペラップとポケモン漫才！)	July 20, 2006	May 26, 2007
While Ash and friends head for the Battle Pyramid, they run into a Chatot, and a girl named Ada running after it. Ada explains that it is her dream to become a famous comedian with Chatot, but it keeps running away from her. After escaping from Team Rocket, the group chase Chatot after it flies away and realize that it was copying phrases from a nearby hospital, where they find out from the hospital staff that Chatot has been going to the hospital to visit little kids. Ada decides to do her comedy routine for everyone at the hospital, and Ash and the others decide to join her. Brock sings a song with his Corphish, Ash shows off with Donphan and Pikachu, Max uses May's Munchlax, May uses Squirtle and Eevee, and finally Ada wraps up with Chatot. When Team Rocket shows up to steal Chatot, can the group fight them off and save the day?
461	457	40	"Duels of the Jungle!" (Attack! The Stray Manyula!!); Transliteration: "Pshūgeki! Hagure Manyūra!!" (Japanese: 襲撃！はぐれマニューラ！！)	July 27, 2006	June 2, 2007
On their way to the Battle Pyramid, Ash and his friends encounter an injured Weavile after it attacks Aipom, and then the rest of the group. They are saved by a wilderness guardian named Kerrigan. He explains that there is a large group of Sneasel and Weavile in the forest but the Weavile that attacked them left the group and has been attacking any trainers that it finds. Ash and his friends go with Kerrigan to help Weavile and find out why it has been acting out.
462	458	41	"Overjoyed!" (Battle Pyramid Again! Vs. Registeel!); Transliteration: "Batoru Piramiddo Futatabi! Tai Rejisuchiru!!" (Japanese: バトルピラミッド再び！VSレジスチル！！)	August 3, 2006	June 9, 2007
Finding the Battle Pyramid in time for his rematch against Brandon and his Legendary Pokémon, Ash decides to train against the Nurse Joy in Fennel Valley to test his Pokémon. After the battle, however, he obtains Torkoal from Professor Oak and rechallenges Brandon for the rematch. However Brandon this time uses the Legendary Pokémon Registeel.
463	459	42	"The Unbeatable Lightness of Seeing!" (Haruka vs. Shū! Rivals Forever!!); Transliteration: "Haruka Tai Shū! Raibaru yo Eien ni!!" (Japanese: ハルカVSシュウ！ライバルよ永遠に！！)	August 10, 2006	June 16, 2007
Having lost his match against Brandon, Ash ponders his next move while staying at the Fennel Valley Pokémon Center. He gets a spark for a rematch when Professor Oak arrives with a 'pick me up' package from Delia and Ash's Pokémon, as well as a postcard from Gary and a gift from Misty. When Drew appears on the scene, he notices that May is sad and decides to cheer her up by challenging her to a battle. May gladly accepts Drew's challenge and the two of them start their match, using the Pokémon Center's Contest Hall. Will the rivals have an all out battle?
464	460	43	"Pinch Healing!" (The Pokémon Center is Very Busy!); Transliteration: "Pokemon Sentā wa Ōisogashi!" (Japanese: ポケモンセンターはおおいそがし！)	August 17, 2006	June 23, 2007
Ash continues to train at the Fennel Valley Pokémon Center. Brock is ecstatic to cook breakfast with Nurse Joy but enters the kitchen to find Nurse Joy collapsed on the floor. Sick with the flu, Joy has to rest in bed so Ash, Brock, May, Max and Professor Oak offer to help take care of the Pokémon Center while she gets better. Meanwhile, Team Rocket through a series of mishaps causes a car accident, injuring people and Pokémon, so Ash and group leave to help them with Scott's help.
465	461	44	"Gathering the Gang of Four!" (First Pokémon! The Final Battle!!); Transliteration: "Saisho no Pokemon! Saigo no Tatakai!!" (Japanese: 最初のポケモン！最後の戦い！！)	August 24, 2006	June 30, 2007
Ash trades in some of his old Pokémon and brings Bulbasaur, Charizard, and Squirtle back. They head up into the mountains for a little training and reminiscing of the past. After stopping yet another Pikachu stealing attempt from Team Rocket, Ash runs into Brandon who is impressed by the four Pokémon. Brandon declares a 4-on-4 battle this time so he can see Ash's strength. Back with the group, Scott explains that he is the owner of the Battle Frontier and that he started it to expand the art of Pokemon battles. He also reveals that if Ash beats Brandon, that he would be registered in the Battle Frontier Hall of Fame and become a Frontier Brain candidate. The next day, the final battle begins as Brandon chooses Dusclops and Ash chooses Charizard.
466	462	45	"Pace – The Final Frontier!" (Deciding Battle! Vs. Regice!!); Transliteration: "Kessen! Tai Rejiaisu!!" (Japanese: 決戦！VSレジアイス！！)	August 31, 2006	June 30, 2007
Ash continues his battle against Brandon. With faith in his Bulbasaur, Ash manages to finally beat Dusclops. Then, Squirtle faces off against the speedy Ninjask and manages to pull off a win. Squirtle isn't so lucky when he faces down Solrock. Solrock defeats Squirtle. Ash then sends out Bulbasaur, and then Bulbasaur and Solrock knock out each other. So it comes down to the final battle: Pikachu vs. Regice. After a rough battle being trapped multiple times by ice, Pikachu manages to defeat Regice with an ultra powerful Volt Tackle. Ash wins over Brandon and is registered to the Battle Frontier Hall of Fame. Ash is offered the candidate to be a Frontier Brain, but he declines. Ash waves a goodbye and Brandon leaves in his air ship.
467	463	46	"Once More with Reeling!" (Satoshi vs. Haruka! The Last Battle!!); Transliteration: "Satoshi Tai Haruka! Rasuto Batoru!!" (Japanese: サトシVSハルカ！ラストバトル！！)	September 7, 2006	July 7, 2007
Having won the Battle Frontier, the group is headed for home. On their way however, Ash and May decide to enter into a Pokémon Contest that's open to everyone. Appealing with Pikachu and Eevee, Ash and May both get past the Appeals stage and end up having to battle each other in the final. During a break before the final match, Team Rocket appears and steals everyone's Pokémon. Combusken and Sceptile battle Team Rocket and the fight causes Combusken to evolves into Blaziken who blasts Team Rocket away and rescues the Pokémon. The final round of the contest begins, Ash using Sceptile and May using Blaziken. The battle is fierce, however despite the type advantage, Ash gains an upper hand.
468	464	47	"Home is Where the Start Is!" (End of a Journey, Yet Beginning of a Journey!); Transliteration: "Tabi no Owari, Soshite Tabi no Hajimari!" (Japanese: 旅の終わり、そして旅の始まり！)	September 14, 2006	July 14, 2007
The final battle between May and Ash in the Pokémon Contest concludes in a tie. Nurse Joy explains that they only have one medal to give out so Sceptile uses Leaf Blade to cut the medal half, with May and Ash each keeping half. After the battle, Ash, May, Max, and Brock and all their Pokémon share one last meal together. May reveals that she is going to the Johto region alone to compete in the Pokémon Contests there. Disappointed, but excited to one day become a Pokémon trainer himself, Max decides to return to Hoenn. Ash promises to one day battle him once he is a trainer. Ash and Brock watch as May and Max leave on a boat. On their own way home, Brock leaves Ash once more to return to his home in Pewter City and Ash returns to Pallet Town. However, he meets Gary upon his return and they decide to have a Pokémon battle. Ash appears to be confident he will win until he finds Gary has caught an Electivire from the Sinnoh region, which easily beats Pikachu. Ash decides to travel to the Sinnoh region as well and, along with Pikachu, says goodbye and heads to Sinnoh. Aipom, not wanting to leave Ash, sneaks onto the ferry to Sinnoh and meets up with Ash, joining him on his new adventure.

== Home media releases ==
Viz Media have released the series in the United States on two three-disc volume sets.

Volume One was released on June 24, 2008, and contained 24 episodes. Volume Two was released on September 16, 2008, and contained 23 episodes.

Viz Media and Warner Home Video later released the complete series on a 6-disc DVD boxset on January 8, 2019.
