= Masamitsu Hidaka =

Japanese anime director and storyboard artist (1960–2022)

- 日高 政光
- Born: 19 October 1960; Miyazaki Prefecture, Japan
- Died: 9 March 2022 (aged 61)
- Occupations: Director; storyboard artist; production assistant
- Years active: 1980s–2018
- Notable work: Director of Pokémon (1997–2006)

Masamitsu Hidaka (日高 政光, Hidaka Masamitsu; 19 October 1960 – 9 March 2022) was a Japanese anime director and storyboard artist of television anime.

He notably served as the supervising director of the Pokémon television anime series from 1997 to 2006.

== Biography ==
Hidaka was born in Miyazaki Prefecture, Japan on 19 October 1960.

=== Career ===
After graduating from the Department of Architecture at Miyazaki Prefectural Miyazaki Industrial High School and the Department of Architecture, Faculty of Engineering at Kyushu Sangyo University, Hidaka relocated to Tokyo due to recession in the construction industry. Even as a student, his background in understanding architectural blueprints and perspectives allowed him to create dynamic and complex transformation sequences, such as the school's robot transformation in Nekketsu Saikyō Go-Saurer.

Inspired by the films Crusher Joe and Urusei Yatsura: Only You, Hidaka aspired to become an animator and joined Studio Cosmos, where he worked on series such as Taotao.

After gaining experience working on backgrounds, he joined Sunrise as a director, where he directed Nekketsu Saikyō Go-Saurer.

He became a freelancer and worked as a storyboard artist for numerous Sunrise productions. He served as the director of the Pokémon television anime from the show's start until Pokémon: Battle Frontier and as a storyboard artist until Pokémon the Series: Black & White.

=== Death ===
Hidaka died on 9 March 2022, at the age of 61. Despite the cause of death never being disclosed, Naotake Furusato, who worked with Hidaka on numerous productions, revealed that he had heard that Hidaka had been ill for the past couple of years, with the announcement of his death being shared the following day on social media by former classmate Mitsuo Fukuda.

== Filmography ==
=== Television anime ===
- Taotao (1983): Production Assistant
- Musashi no Ken (1985): Production Assistant
- Metal Armor Dragonar (1987): Storyboard and Direction
- Mashin Hero Wataru (1988): Storyboard and Direction
- Madö King Granzört (1989): Storyboard and Direction
- Mashin Hero Wataru 2 (1990): Storyboard and Episode Director
- The Brave of Sun Fighbird (1991): Chief Director
- Genki Bakuhatsu Ganbaruger (1992): Storyboard and Episode Director
- The Brave Express Might Gaine (1993): Storyboard and Episode Director
- Nekketsu Saikyō Go-Saurer (1993): Storyboard and Episode Director
- Jungle King Tar-chan (1993): Storyboard and Episode Director
- Kenyū Densetsu Yaiba (1993): Storyboard
- The Brave Police J-Decker (1994): Storyboard and Episode Director
- Captain Tsubasa J (1994): Storyboard and Episode Director
- Mobile Suit Gundam Wing (1995): Storyboard
- Wild Knights Gulkeeva (1995): Director, Script (episode 14), Storyboard (5 episodes), Episode Director (episodes 14 and 26)
- Mojacko (1995): Storyboard (episodes 12 and 20) and Episode Director (episode 12)
- After War Gundam X (1996): Storyboard and Episode Director
- Brave Command Dagwon (1996): Storyboard and Episode Director
- Reideen the Superior (1996): Storyboard
- The King of Braves GaoGaiGar (1997): Storyboard
- Pokémon: Indigo League (1997): Supervising Director
- Berserk (1997): Storyboard
- Super Mashin Hero Wataru (1997): OP1 and OP2 Storyboard
- Pokémon: Adventures in the Orange Islands (1999): Supervising Director
- Betterman (1999): Storyboard
- Turn A Gundam (1999): Storyboard
- Pokémon: The Johto Journeys (1999): Supervising Director
- Gear Fighter Dendoh (2000): Storyboard
- Pokémon: Johto League Champions (2000): Director
- Brigadoon: Marin & Melan (2000): Storyboard
- s-CRY-ed (2001): Storyboard
- Pokémon: The Legend of Thunder (2001): Director
- Pokémon: Master Quest (2001): Supervising Director
- Final Fantasy: Unlimited (2001): Storyboard
- Pokémon: Advanced (2002): Supervising Director and Storyboard
- Pokémon: Advanced Challenge (2003): Supervising Director
- Pokémon: Advanced Battle (2004): Supervising Director
- Pokémon: Battle Frontier (2005): Supervising Director
- Zegapain (2006): Storyboard
- Pokémon the Series: Diamond and Pearl (2006): Storyboard
- Pokémon: The Mastermind of Mirage Pokémon (2006): Director
- Dragonaut: The Resonance (2007): Storyboard
- Pokémon: Diamond and Pearl: Battle Dimension (2007): Storyboard
- Blassreiter (2008): Storyboard
- Code Geass: Lelouch of the Rebellion R2 (2008): Storyboard
- Linebarrels of Iron (2008): Director
- Pokémon: Diamond and Pearl: Galactic Battles (2008): Storyboard
- Saki (2009): Storyboard
- The Sacred Blacksmith (2009): Storyboard
- The Qwaser of Stigmata (2010): Storyboard
- Pokémon: Diamond and Pearl: Sinnoh League Victors (2010): Storyboard
- The Qwasar of Stigmata II (2011): Storyboard
- Pokémon the Series: Black & White (2010): Storyboard
- Manyu Scroll (2011): Storyboard
- The Severing Crime Edge (2013): Storyboard
- Hayate the Combat Butler: Cuties (2013): Storyboard
- Saki: The Nationals (2014): Storyboard
- Nano Invaders (2014): Storyboard (episode 15)
- Haikyū!! Karasuno High School vs Shiratorizawa Academy (2014): Storyboard
- Shōnen Ashibe Go! Go! Goma-chan (2016): Storyboard
- Tsuredure Children (2017): Storyboard (episode 52)
- Märchen Mädchen (2018): Storyboard and Unit Director

=== Theatrical anime ===
- Ranma ½: Big Trouble in Nekonron, China (1991): Storyboard and Unit Director
- Fatal Fury: The Motion Picture (1994): Unit Director
- Pokémon: The First Movie (1998): Unit Director
- Pokémon the Movie 2000 (1999): Unit Director
- Pokémon 3: The Movie (2000): Unit Director
- Pikachu & Pichu (2000): Unit Director
- Pokémon 4Ever (2001): Unit Director
- Pokémon: Lucario and the Mystery of Mew (2005): Production Committee (OLM)
- Pokémon Ranger and the Temple of the Sea (2006): Production Committee (OLM)
- Pokémon—Zoroark: Master of Illusions (2010): Storyboard
- Inazuma Eleven: Saikyō Gundan Ōga Shūrai (2010): Unit Director
- Pokémon the Movie: Black—Victini and Reshiram and White—Victini and Zekrom (2011): Unit Director
- Inazuma Eleven GO: Kyūkyoku no Kizuna Gurifon (2011): Unit Director
- Pokémon the Movie: Kyurem vs. the Sword of Justice (2012): Unit Director
- Inazuma Eleven GO vs. Danbōru Senki W (2012): Unit Director
- Pokémon the Movie: Genesect and the Legend Awakened (2013): Storyboard and Unit Director
- Code Geass: Akito the Exiled "The Wyvern Divided" (2013): Storyboard
- New Initial D the Movie Legend 1: Awakening (2014): Director, Storyboard, Unit Director
- Code Geass: Akito the Exiled "The Brightness Falls" (2015): Storyboard
- New Initial D the Movie Legend 2: Racer (2015): Chief Director and Storyboard
- New Initial D the Movie Legend 3: Dreamer (2016): Chief Director and Storyboard

=== Original video animation (OVA) ===
- GREED (1985): Production Management and Animation
- Dirty Pair: With Love from the Lovely Angels (1987): Assistant Director
- Ushio & Tora (1993): Storyboard and Unit Director
- Mobile Suit Gundam: The 08th MS Team (1996): Unit Director
- I Dream of Mimi (1997): Director
- The Silent Service (1997): Storyboard and Unit Director
- POWER DoLLS: Detachment of Limited Line Service Project Alpha (1998): Director
- The King of Braves GaoGaiGar Final (2000): Storyboard
- Code Geass: Akito the Exiled "The Wyvern Divided" (2013): Storyboard
- Code Geass: Akito the Exiled "The Brightness Falls" (2015): Storyboard
- New Initial D the Movie Battle Digest (2022): Director

=== Western animation ===
- Inspector Gadget (1985): Background

=== Video games ===
- Inazuma Eleven Strikers (2011): OP Storyboard and Unit Director

=== Other ===
- Metal Armor Dragonar Pachislot Picture Drama Meio Plato/Min (2015): Script and Storyboard
