= Pokémon: Johto League Champions =

Fourth season of the Pokémon animated television series

- Season 4
- English DVD cover
- No. of episodes: 52

Release
- Original network: TV Tokyo
- Original release: August 3, 2000 – August 2, 2001

Season chronology
- ← Previous; The Johto Journeys Next → Master Quest

Pokémon: Johto League Champions is the fourth season of the Pokémon anime series and the second season of Pokémon the Series: Gold and Silver, known in Japan as Pocket Monsters (ポケットモンスター, Poketto Monsutā. (Note: For the DVD release, the title was changed to Pocket Monsters: Episode Gold & Silver (ポケットモンスター金銀編, Poketto Monsutā Kin Gin Hen)) It originally aired in Japan from August 3, 2000, to August 2, 2001, on TV Tokyo, and in the United States from August 18, 2001, to September 7, 2002, on The WB/Kids' WB.

The season follows Ash Ketchum as he continues travelling across the Johto region with Misty and Brock.

The episodes were directed by Masamitsu Hidaka and produced by the animation studio OLM.

== Episode list ==
| Jap. overall | Eng. overall | No. in season | English title Japanese title | Original release date | English air date |
|---|---|---|---|---|---|
| 160 | 158 | 1 | "A Goldenrod Opportunity" (Kogane Gym! Speed & Power!?); Transliteration: "Kogane Jimu! Supīdo ando Pawā!?" (Japanese: コガネジム! スピード&パワー!?) | August 3, 2000 | August 18, 2001 |
Ash challenges the Goldenrod City Gym Leader, Whitney, to win the Plain Badge. However, Milltank proves to be too much of a challenge for Ash and his Pokémon with her Rollout attack.
| 161 | 159 | 2 | "A Dairy Tale Ending" (Miltank! Revenge Battle!!); Transliteration: "Mirutanku! Ribenji Batoru!!" (Japanese: ミルタンク! リベンジバトル!!) | August 10, 2000 | August 18, 2001 |
An unconfident Ash tries to figure out a strategy to defeat Miltank. Is the rematch heading in his favor, or will Whitney shatter Ash's dreams to win at the Johto League?
| 162 | 160 | 3 | "Air Time!" (Battle of the Radio Tower! Surpass Spacetime!!); Transliteration: "Rajiotō no Tatakai! Jikū o Koete!!" (Japanese: ラジオとうのたたかい! じくうをこえて!!) | August 17, 2000 | September 8, 2001 |
Ash is invited as a guest by DJ Mary on her Goldenrod City radio program. Fiction soon turns into reality when Team Rocket gets involved in the show.
| 163 | 161 | 4 | "The Bug Stops Here" (Bug Trainer Convention! Got It at the Natural Park!!); Transliteration: "Mushitori Taikai! Shizen Kōen de Getto da ze!!" (Japanese: むしとりたいかい! しぜんこうえんでゲットだぜ!!) | August 24, 2000 | August 25, 2001 |
Ash meets Casey at the Bug Catching Contest, and the competition between the two is fierce – especially when Team Rocket is around.
| 164 | 162 | 5 | "Type Casting" (Where Is Usokkie!?); Transliteration: "Usokkī wa Doko ni Iru!?" (Japanese: ウソッキーはどこにいる!?) | August 31, 2000 | September 1, 2001 |
Ash and friends must somehow cross a river where a recent storm has washed the bridge away. A riverman promises to take them to the opposite bank if they can find an elusive Sudowoodo.
| 165 | 163 | 6 | "Fossil Fools" (Ancient Pokémon Park! Ruins of Alph!!); Transliteration: "Kodai Pokemon Pāku! Arufu no Iseki!!" (Japanese: こだいポケモンパーク! アルフのいせき!!) | September 7, 2000 | September 15, 2001 |
Ash and friends meet the prehistoric Pokémon Omanyte and Omastar in the Ruins of Alph after Team Rocket displaced them from the reservoir they lived in.
| 166 | 164 | 7 | "Carrying On" (The Carrier Poppo of the Poppo Store!); Transliteration: "Poppo ya no Densho Poppo!" (Japanese: ポッポやのでんしょポッポ!) | September 14, 2000 | September 22, 2001 |
The Pidgey Express messenger service is put in jeopardy when Team Rocket begins capturing Pidgey for their own profit. A young boy called Malachi must not only defeat them, but also win back his Grandpa's trust.
| 167 | 165 | 8 | "Hassle in the Castle" (Zubat's Mansion! A Dangerous Labyrinth!!); Transliteration: "Zubatto no Yakata! Kiken na Meiro!!" (Japanese: ズバットのやかた! きけんなめいろ!!) | September 21, 2000 | September 29, 2001 |
Ash and friends come upon a castle that has been turned into a clinic that uses Pokémon to aid its patients. Team Rocket gets involved with their usual antics on capturing Pikachu, but soon trap themselves with Brock in a maze under the castle.
| 168 | 166 | 9 | "Two Hits and a Miss" (Kapoerer vs. Fushigidane! Hand to Hand Showdown!!); Transliteration: "Kapoerā Tai Fushigidane! Kakutō Taiketsu!!" (Japanese: カポエラーVSフシギダネ! かくとうたいけつ!!) | September 28, 2000 | September 15, 2001 |
Ash and Bulbasaur help Chigusa, the granddaughter of Shihan Kenzo, and her Hitmontop train to become the Dojo's newest Shihan.
| 169 | 167 | 10 | "A Hot Water Battle" (The Three of the Jungle! Battle in the Hot Springs!!); Transliteration: "Janguru no San Biki! Onsen Batoru!!" (Japanese: ジャングルのさんびき! おんせんバトル!!) | October 5, 2000 | September 22, 2001 |
An innocent game ends with Chikorita, Cyndaquil, and Totodile at odds with each other. As they quarrel, they are drawn into a great adventure when they accidentally tumble into a hidden passage.
| 170 | 168 | 11 | "Hook, Line, and Stinker" (Azumao! Fishing Battle!!); Transliteration: "Azumaō! Fisshingu Batoru!!" (Japanese: アズマオウ! フィッシングバトル!!) | October 12, 2000 | September 29, 2001 |
Anxious to show off her fishing skills, Misty enters a Seaking Fishing Competition. But if she wants to win, she'll have to face Andreas, a rude egotistic trainer that gave her trouble earlier.
| 171 | 169 | 12 | "Beauty and the Breeder" (Goodbye, Rokon! Pokémon Beauty Contest!!); Transliteration: "Sayonara Rokon! Pokemon Byūtī Kontesuto!!" (Japanese: さよならロコン! ポケモンビューティーコンテスト!!) | October 19, 2000 | October 6, 2001 |
Brock joins up with his old friend Suzy. Together with her Vulpix, they enter the Pokémon Beauty Competition.
| 172 | 170 | 13 | "A Better Pill to Swallow" (Tsubotsubo vs. Madatsubomi); Transliteration: "Tsubotsubo Tai Madatsubomi" (Japanese: ツボツボVSマダツボミ) | October 26, 2000 | October 13, 2001 |
Ash and the gang meet a hermit called Old Man Shuckle who makes natural remedies. But when Team Rocket drinks juice produced by a wild Shuckle, which is a component of one of Old Man Shuckle's remedies, they throw the behavior of all Pokémon in the area out of balance.
| 173 | 171 | 14 | "Power Play!" (Blacky! Battle During a Dark Night!!); Transliteration: "Burakkī! Yamiyo no Tatakai!!" (Japanese: ブラッキー! やみよのたたかい!!) | November 2, 2000 | October 20, 2001 |
When Jessie builds a robo-mecha-Wobbuffet, with a Counter attack that will turn a Pokémon's own attack against it with double the power, Ash needs all the help he can get, even if that means teaming up with Gary.
| 174 | 172 | 15 | "Mountain Time" (Redian! Exceeding the Valley of the Wind!!); Transliteration: "Redian! Kaze no Tani o Koete!!" (Japanese: レディアン! かぜのたにをこえて!!) | November 9, 2000 | October 20, 2001 |
When Team Rocket kidnaps Pikachu and Togepi, it's up to Ash and friends to keep these villains from destroying themselves and the two captive Pokémon along with them.
| 175 | 173 | 16 | "Wobbu-Palooza" (Village of Sonans!?); Transliteration: "Sōnansu no Mura!?" (Japanese: ソーナンスのむら!?) | November 16, 2000 | October 27, 2001 |
Ash and friends attend a Wobbuffet Festival that honors the Wobbuffet. When a gang of delinquents attack, Ash attempts to stop them. But how can he defend the town if he's not allowed to fight? Team Rocket might end up being the answer.
| 176 | 174 | 17 | "Imitation Confrontation" (Aim to Be a Metamon Master! Imite Returns!!); Transliteration: "Mezase Metamon Masutā! Imite Futatabi!!" (Japanese: めざせメタモンマスター! イミテふたたび!!) | November 23, 2000 | October 27, 2001 |
Ash and friends are reunited with Duplica, the aspiring Ditto Master, and find her now troubled with a Ditto that is unable to change its size, no matter what Pokémon it transforms into.
| 177 | 175 | 18 | "The Trouble with Snubbull" (Nyarth, Bull and Granbull!?); Transliteration: "Nyāsu to Burū to Guranburu!?" (Japanese: ニャースとブルーとグランブル!?) | November 30, 2000 | November 3, 2001 |
When Ash and friends spot Madame Muchmoney's Snubbull, they try to track down the Pokémon before Team Rocket can get their hands on it.
| 178 | 176 | 19 | "Ariados, Amigos" (Ariados! Battle of Ninja Arts!!); Transliteration: "Ariadosu! Ninpō Batoru!!" (Japanese: アリアドス! にんぽうバトル!!) | December 7, 2000 | November 17, 2001 |
Ash and friends are reunited with their one-time adversary, Aya, who is continuing devotedly on the path to the Pokémon Jujitsu Academy. Ash and Brock enjoy the special classes, but Misty, because of her phobia of bug-type Pokémon, doesn't.
| 179 | 177 | 20 | "Wings 'N' Things" (Flap, Yanyanma! Fly to Tomorrow's Sky!!); Transliteration: "Habatake Yanyanma! Ashita no Sora e!!" (Japanese: はばたけヤンヤンマ! あしたのそらへ!!) | December 14, 2000 | November 17, 2001 |
Zachary Evans, the son of a glassmaker, adopts a Yanma he finds in the wild, not knowing that this Pokémon's signature attack creates a shockwave that shatters all glass in the area.
| 180 | 178 | 21 | "The Grass Route" (Popocco! Grass Pokémon Battle!!); Transliteration: "Popokko! Kusa Pokemon Batoru!!" (Japanese: ポポッコ! くさポケモンバトル!!) | December 21, 2000 | November 3, 2001 |
Ash and company chance upon the Grass Pokémon Tournament, an annual affair where trainers pit their herbaceous Pokémon against each other in the spirit of friendly combative horticulture.
| 181 | 179 | 22 | "The Apple Corp" (Pikachu and Pichu!); Transliteration: "Pikachū to Pichū!" (Japanese: ピカチュウとピチュー!) | January 4, 2001 | December 1, 2001 |
A young orchard owner called Charmaine mistakes Pikachu for a thief who's eaten large amounts of her crops. Ash and friends set her straight by revealing the true culprits: a group of Pichu that live nearby.
| 182 | 180 | 23 | "Houndoom's Special Delivery" (Hellgar and Togepy!); Transliteration: "Herugā to Togepī!" (Japanese: ヘルガーとトゲピー!) | January 11, 2001 | December 1, 2001 |
After a run-in with Team Rocket, Togepi disappears. Even more alarming are the large footprints they found next to Togepi's, which could only belong to a very big Pokémon.
| 183 | 181 | 24 | "A Ghost of a Chance" (The Burned Tower! Matsuba Appears!!); Transliteration: "Yaketa Tō! Matsuba Tōjō!!" (Japanese: やけたとう! マツバとうじょう!!) | January 18, 2001 | November 10, 2001 |
Ash and friends finally reach Ecruteak City and meet up with a Gym Leader, Morty, with greater ease than they had thought. But they meet not in the Pokémon Gym, but in the charred ruins of a centuries-old tower.
| 184 | 182 | 25 | "From Ghost to Ghost" (Enju Gym! Ghost Battle!!); Transliteration: "Enju Jimu! Gōsuto Batoru!!" (Japanese: エンジュジム! ゴーストバトル!!) | January 25, 2001 | November 10, 2001 |
Ash has his fourth gym battle with Morty, the ghost trainer. To win the Fog Badge, he might need to rely on the eyes of Noctowl.
| 185 | 183 | 26 | "Trouble's Brewing" (The 5 Sisters of Eievui! Battle at the Tea Ceremony!!); Transliteration: "Ībui Go-Shimai! Ochakai de Batoru!!" (Japanese: イーブイ5しまい! おちゃかいでバトル!!) | February 1, 2001 | December 8, 2001 |
Brock is in heaven when he, Ash, and Misty chance upon a Japanese garden maintained by five beautiful sisters, each specializing in a traditional art of Japan.
| 186 | 184 | 27 | "All That Glitters!" (Yamikarasu! The Stolen Badges!!); Transliteration: "Yamikarasu! Ubawareta Bajji!!" (Japanese: ヤミカラス! うばわれたバッジ!!) | February 8, 2001 | December 15, 2001 |
Reveling in his recent successes, Ash pauses to polish his newly earned badges when a flock of Murkrow arrive and make off with his hard-won prizes.
| 187 | 185 | 28 | "The Light Fantastic" (Teppouo's Sky!); Transliteration: "Teppouo no Sora!" (Japanese: テッポウオのそら!) | February 15, 2001 | December 15, 2001 |
Inspired by an elderly artist called Gan Gogh, Ash and his friends journey into the desert in search of strange lights. They soon reach a gigantic crystal monolith that's surrounded by dozens of Remoraid.
| 188 | 186 | 29 | "UnBEARable" (Himeguma's Secret!); Transliteration: "Himeguma no Himitsu!" (Japanese: ヒメグマのひみつ!) | February 22, 2001 | January 19, 2002 |
Misty befriends a cuddly Teddiursa. But the mischievous Pokémon turns out to be more trouble than he's worth.
| 189 | 187 | 30 | "Moving Pictures" (The Mystery of the Frozen Himanuts!!); Transliteration: "Kōtta Himanattsu no Nazo!!" (Japanese: こおったヒマナッツのなぞ!!) | March 1, 2001 | January 26, 2002 |
A chunk of ice falls from the sky. Ash and friends examine the block and discover that a Sunkern is frozen inside. They get help from Marcello and Sophia, an elderly husband and wife who are quick to lend a hand in thawing the Pokémon.
| 190 | 188 | 31 | "Spring Fever" (Dig Here, Urimoo! Search for the Hot Spring!!); Transliteration: "Koko Hore Urimū! Onsen o Sagase!!" (Japanese: ここほれウリムー! おんせんをさがせ!!) | March 8, 2001 | February 2, 2002 |
Todd Snap rejoins Ash's group after spotting an Articuno flying into the mountains. When a trio of Swinub make off with Misty's rice cake, Ash and friends jump to pursuit. They soon learn that these Pokémon are in the employ of the water prospectors Rory and Peggy.
| 191 | 189 | 32 | "Freeze Frame" (Freezer vs. Purin! In the Middle of a Snowstorm!!); Transliteration: "Furīzā Tai Purin! Fubuki no Naka de!!" (Japanese: フリーザーVSプリン! ふぶきのなかで!!) | March 15, 2001 | February 9, 2002 |
Ash and friends encounter Articuno. The legendary Pokémon uses its power to hold off a dangerous blizzard. But after facing Team Rocket, will the Articuno be able to stay the fierce storm?
| 192 | 190 | 33 | "The Stolen Stones!" (Windie and the Fire Stone!); Transliteration: "Uindi to Honō no Ishi!" (Japanese: ウインディとほのおのいし!) | March 22, 2001 | February 16, 2002 |
Ash and friends meet Keegan and Ramona, a brother and sister who run a small delivery service. When Keegan is injured in a Team Rocket attack, he turns to Ash to guide the team of Arcanine to their destination.
| 193 | 191 | 34 | "The Dunsparce Deception" (There Aren't Any Nokocchi Here!?); Transliteration: "Nokotchi wa no Kotchinai!?" (Japanese: ノコッチはのこっちない!?) | March 29, 2001 | February 23, 2002 |
Team Rocket manages to con all the children in a town into giving up their Dunsparce. When Ash and friends pursue their enemies, a young trainer called Bucky tags along, hoping to catch a Dunsparce of his own.
| 194 | 192 | 35 | "The Wayward Wobbuffet" (Sonans! Is That So?); Transliteration: "Sōnansu! Sō nan su?" (Japanese: ソーナンス! そうなんす?) | April 5, 2001 | March 2, 2002 |
Team Rocket captures Pikachu, and promptly locks it away in an unbreakable cage while Wobbuffet holds onto the key. However, it gets left behind and soon Wobbuffet goes on an adventure of his own, as Ash and his friends and Team Rocket try to find him. Ash also helps Officer Jenny capture a thief along the way.
| 195 | 193 | 36 | "Sick Daze" (Takeshi Collapses! A Dangerous Camp!!); Transliteration: "Takeshi Taoreru! Abunai Kyanpu!!" (Japanese: タケシたおれる! あぶないキャンプ!!) | April 12, 2001 | March 9, 2002 |
Ash and Misty never truly realized what a help their friend was to them until a serious cold leaves Brock bedridden and all the daily chores are left for them to do.
| 196 | 194 | 37 | "Ring Masters" (Ordile vs. Kamex! Sumo Battle!!); Transliteration: "Ōdairu Tai Kamekkusu! Sumō Batoru!!" (Japanese: オーダイルVSカメックス! すもうバトル!!) | April 19, 2001 | March 16, 2002 |
Ash and friends chance by a Pokémon Sumo Championship. Ash asks for Snorlax from Prof. Oak in return of Noctowl. Though Ash is a new hand at sumo, his Snorlax proves an able wrestler, and he quickly becomes the favorite for victory. In the final, Ash and his Snorlax must fight a Feraligatr. Will Ash win?
| 197 | 195 | 38 | "The Poké-Spokesman" (You Can Speak with Pokémon!? The Words and Feelings of Pokémon!); Transliteration: "Pokemon to Hanasemasu!? Pokemon no Kotoba Pokemon no Kimochi!" (Japanese: ポケモンとはなせます!? ポケモンのことばポケモンのきもち!) | April 26, 2001 | March 23, 2002 |
When Pikachu starts acting strangely, Simon, a man claiming to speak Pokémon language, suggests that it needs a recharge. However, Simon is wanted for fraudulent Pokémon translating.
| 198 | 196 | 39 | "Control Freak!" (Golbat vs. the Masked Queen Musashi! The Ruins Battle!!); Transliteration: "Gorubatto Tai Kamen no Joō Musashi! Iseki no Tatakai!!" (Japanese: ゴルバットVSかめんのじょおうムサシ! いせきのたたかい!!) | May 3, 2001 | March 30, 2002 |
In the ruins of an ancient kingdom, Jessie uncovers a staff and mask that allows her to control any Pokémon. Team Rocket escapes with Ash's Pikachu, but discovers the Pokémon-controlling abilities of the staff and mask only work within the boundaries of the village. It's up to Brock to stop Team Rocket and retrieve the staff and mask.
| 199 | 197 | 40 | "The Art of Pokémon" (The Miracle of Doble!! Shining in the Morning Sun!); Transliteration: "Dōburu no Kiseki!! Asahi no Naka de Kagayaite!" (Japanese: ドーブルのきせき!! あさひのなかでかがやいて!) | May 10, 2001 | April 6, 2002 |
In Whitestone, a town famed for its limestone white facades, a group of Smeargle are wreaking havoc. They are literally painting the town with multicolored paints they emit from their tails.
| 200 | 198 | 41 | "The Heartbreak of Brock" (Nidorino, Nidorina! Takeshi's Rose-colored Days!?); Transliteration: "Nidorīno Nidorīna! Takeshi no Barairo no Hibi!?" (Japanese: ニドリーノニドリーナ! タケシばらいろのひび!?) | May 17, 2001 | April 13, 2002 |
When Brock meets a girl called Temacu who has feelings for him, he suddenly gets cold feet. Team Rocket doesn't make it any easier for them.
| 201 | 199 | 42 | "Current Events" (Goodbye, Chicorita!? The Labyrinth of Electricity!); Transliteration: "Sayonara Chikorita!? Denki no Rabirinsu!" (Japanese: さよならチコリータ!? でんきのラビリンス!) | May 24, 2001 | April 27, 2002 |
When Ash investigates a break-in at an electric facility, he accidentally gets locked in with Chikorita inside the facility. To make matters worse, the crack teams of Magnemite, Magneton and Electabuzz have been trained to attack all intruders.
| 202 | 200 | 43 | "Turning Over a New Bayleef" (Where Did Bayleef Go!? Capture at the Herb Garden!); Transliteration: "Beirīfu wa Doko ni Itta!? Hābu Batake de Tsukamaete!" (Japanese: ベイリーフはどこへいった!? ハーブばたけでつかまえて!) | May 31, 2001 | May 4, 2002 |
Growing pains threaten a beautiful trainer-Pokémon relationship when the newly evolved Bayleef is unable to adjust to its size and repeatedly knocks Ash to the ground with its enthusiastic feelings. Eventually, Ash gets furious and Bayleef runs away.
| 203 | 201 | 44 | "Doin' What Comes Natu-rally" (Naty Fortune Teller! The Mystery of Telling the Future!!); Transliteration: "Neiti Uranai! Mirai Yochi no Shinpi!!" (Japanese: ネイティうらない! みらいよちのしんぴ!!) | June 7, 2001 | May 18, 2002 |
Ash meets Mackenzie, a shy Natu fortune teller who gets too nervous to perform in front of an audience. Anxious to help another youngster who, like himself, has a dream, Ash offers Mackenzie some advice.
| 204 | 202 | 45 | "The Big Balloon Blow-Up" (The Big Pokémon Balloon Race! Get Past the Storm!!); Transliteration: "Pokemon Kikyū Dai Rēsu! Arashi o Koete!!" (Japanese: ポケモンききゅうだいレース! あらしをこえて!!) | June 14, 2001 | May 25, 2002 |
Ash and friends enter a hot air balloon race that uses Pokémon to propel the balloons forward. But with Team Rocket sabotaging competitors, it will not be an easy race for Ash to win.
| 205 | 203 | 46 | "The Screen Actor's Guilt" (Muchul is Daydreaming!! Do Superstars Like Pokémon?); Transliteration: "Muchūru ni Mō Muchū!! Sūpāsutā wa Pokemon ga Osuki?" (Japanese: ムチュールにもうむちゅう!! スーパースターはポケモンがおすき?) | June 21, 2001 | June 1, 2002 |
A hooded man drops off a Smoochum with Ash and the gang. The trainers return the Pokémon to its owner, a famous actor called Brad van Darn, but it's not long before Smoochum goes missing again.
| 206 | 204 | 47 | "Right On, Rhydon!" (Follow the Surfing Sidon!? The Battle at the Lake!); Transliteration: "Naminori Saidon o Oe!? Mizuumi no Tatakai!" (Japanese: なみのりサイドンをおえ!? みずうみのたたかい!) | June 28, 2001 | June 22, 2002 |
Ash and the gang run into a civil engineer called Pietra who is having troubles digging in a leaky tunnel. But Ash knows just the Rhydon for the job.
| 207 | 205 | 48 | "The Kecleon Caper" (Where's Kakureon!? Huge Chaos Created by the Invisible Pokémon!); Transliteration: "Kakureon wa Doko ni Iru!? Mienai Pokemon ni Daikonran!" (Japanese: カクレオンはどこにいる!? みえないポケモンにだいこんらん!) | July 5, 2001 | August 17, 2002 |
Anxious to impress two sisters called Madison and Alexa, Brock volunteers to find a pair of Kecleon that have gone missing on a blimp. Ash and Misty join in on what becomes a madcap chase through the huge vessel.
| 208 | 206 | 49 | "The Joy of Water Pokémon" (The Nurse Joy who Hates Water Pokémon!? Kasumi's Anger!); Transliteration: "Mizu Pokemon-Girai no Joī-san!? Kasumi no Ikari!" (Japanese: みずポケモンぎらいのジョーイさん!? カスミのいかり!) | July 12, 2001 | August 24, 2002 |
Misty finally meets the famous Nurse Joy who specializes in treating Water Pokémon. But her excitement turns to disappointment when she learns that this Nurse Joy personally detests Water Pokémon.
| 209 | 207 | 50 | "Got Miltank?" (The Mother Miltank! The Desert's Secret!); Transliteration: "Seibo Mirutanku! Sabaku no Himitsu!" (Japanese: せいぼミルタンク! さばくのひみつ!) | July 19, 2001 | August 31, 2002 |
When Ash's Cyndaquil goes missing, he's determined to find it, even if it means seeking out a hidden desert oasis and breaking through its seemingly impregnable defense.
| 210 | 208 | 51 | "Fight for the Light" (Radiance Lighthouse! Battle at Asagi City!!); Transliteration: "Kagayaki no Tōdai! Asagi Shiti no Tatakai!!" (Japanese: かがやきのとうだい! アサギシティのたたかい!!) | July 26, 2001 | September 7, 2002 |
Ash is in the heat of battle with the Olivine Gym Leader, when a stranger appears and breaks up the match. It turns out that the girl Ash has been battling is not the Gym Leader she claimed to be.
| 211 | 209 | 52 | "Machoke, Machoke Man!" (Tanba Gym! Front-Game Wrestling Showdown!!); Transliteration: "Tanba Jimu! Makkō Shōbu Kakutō Taiketsu!!" (Japanese: タンバジム! まっこうしょうぶかくとうたいけつ!!) | August 2, 2001 | September 7, 2002 |
Ash encounters the Cianwood Gym Leader Chuck and challenges him to a battle where Ash's battle strategy is tested.

== Music ==
The Japanese opening songs are "OK!" by Rica Matsumoto for 34 episodes, and "Aim to be a Pokémon Master" (めざせポケモンマスター 2001, Mezase Pokémon Masutā 2001) by Whiteberry for 18 episodes. The ending songs are "Takeshi's Paradise" (タケシのパラダイス, Takeshi no Paradaisu) by Yūji Ueda for 5 episodes, "Exciting Pokémon Relay" (ポケモンはらはらリレー, Pokémon Hara Hara Rirē) by Rikako Aikawa and Chorus for 10 episodes, "To My Best Friend" (ぼくのベストフレンドへ, Boku no Besuto Furendo e) by Hiromi Iwasaki for 19 episodes, "Face Forward Team Rocket!" (前向きロケット団!, Maemuki Roketto-Dan!) by Jessie, James, & Meowth with chorus by Wobbuffet for 18 episodes, and the English opening song is "Born to Be a Winner" by David Rolfe. Its short version serves as the end credit song.

== Home media releases ==
In the United States, Viz Video and Pioneer Entertainment (and later Ventura Distribution) released the series on DVD and VHS. The VHS versions continued on with the numbered volume sets consisting of three select episodes from the series, and were known as the "High-Voltage Collection". The DVD releases were known as the "Collector's Edition DVDs" and consisted of 7-10 episodes per DVD. These releases have long since gone out-of-print.

Viz Media released Pokémon: Johto League Champions – The Complete Collection on DVD in the United States on May 31, 2016.
