= Pokémon: Advanced =

Sixth season of the Pokémon animated television series

- Season 6
- English front cover of the Pokémon: Advanced DVD collection box
- No. of episodes: 40

Release
- Original network: TV Tokyo
- Original release: November 21, 2002 – August 28, 2003

Season chronology
- ← Previous; Master Quest Next → Advanced Challenge

Pokémon: Advanced is the sixth season of the Pokémon anime series and the first season of Pokémon the Series: Ruby and Sapphire, known in Japan as Pocket Monsters: Advanced Generation (ポケットモンスター アドバンスジェネレーション, Poketto Monsutā Adobansu Jenerēshon). It originally aired in Japan from November 21, 2002, to August 28, 2003, on TV Tokyo, and in the United States from January 3, to October 2, 2004, on Kids' WB/The WB.

The season follows Ash Ketchum as he travels across the Hoenn region to challenge its Pokémon League while joined by Brock, May, an aspiring Pokémon Coordinator, and Max, her younger brother.

The episodes were directed by Masamitsu Hidaka and produced by the animation studio OLM.

== Episode list ==
Jap. overall	Eng. overall	No. in season	English title Japanese title	Original release date	English air date
277	274	1	"Get the Show on the Road!" (A New Land! A New Adventure!!); Transliteration: "Aratanaru Daichi! Aratanaru Bōken!!" (Japanese: 新たなる大地! 新たなる冒険!!)	November 21, 2002	January 3, 2004 (Note: These episodes were broadcast on Kids' WB on March 15, 2003, as part of a special sneak peek at the upcoming Advanced season. It was later redubbed and rebroadcast for inclusion during the standard broadcasts the following January 2004.)
Finally in Littleroot Town, Ash and Professor Birch discover that Pikachu has an electrical overload. The excess electricity causes Pikachu to run off in pain. Ash and Professor Birch give chase, but they are soon attacked by a pack of Poochyena, who chase Professor Birch, interfering with the beginning of a new journey for a 10-year-old young Trainer named May, who after all the trouble chooses a Hoenn Fire-type Starter Torchic for her first Pokémon. Who's That Pokémon?: Lanturn
278	275	2	"A Ruin with a View" (Ancient Pokémon and Mysterious Teams!); Transliteration: "Kodai Pokémon to Nazo no Gundan!" (Japanese: 古代ポケモンと謎の軍団!)	November 28, 2002	January 10, 2004
Ash and May encounter a set of ruins, where they help Professor Aldon rediscover a nearly-extinct Pokémon, during which they encounter Team Magma. Who's That Pokémon?: Crobat
279	276	3	"There's No Place Like Hoenn" (Tōka Gym! Vs. Yarukimono!); Transliteration: "Tōka Jimu! Tai Yarukimono!" (Japanese: トウカジム! VSヤルキモノ!)	December 5, 2002	January 17, 2004
Ash arrives in Petalburg City, where he hopes to battle in his first Hoenn Gym match. Ash meets May's younger brother, Max. May's father, Norman, is the Petalburg Gym Leader and Ash challenges him to a Gym battle, but since Ash does not have three Pokémon with him they only have an informal trainer battle which is interrupted by Team Rocket. Who's That Pokémon?: Cleffa
280	277	4	"You Never Can Taillow" (Full of Subame, Full of Danger! Got It in Tōka Woods!); Transliteration: "Subame ga Ippai, Kiken ga Ippai! Tōka no Mori de Getto da ze!!" (Japanese: スバメがいっぱい 危険がいっぱい! トウカの森でゲットだぜ!!)	December 12, 2002	January 24, 2004
Ash catches his first Hoenn Pokémon, a Taillow. In all the excitement, an old friend returns, Brock and his Forretress. Who's That Pokémon?: Misdreavus
281	278	5	"In the Knicker of Time!" (Jiguzaguma and Short-Pantsed Boy! Haruka's First Battle!!); Transliteration: "Jigujaguma to Tanpan-kozō! Haruka Hajimete no Batoru!!" (Japanese: ジグザグマと短パン小僧! ハルカはじめてのバトル!!)	December 19, 2002	January 31, 2004
A kid named Nicholai attempts to catch a Zigzagoon. May has her first match against him after he hears she's a Gym Leader's daughter. But when Nicholai insults May's father, Max wants revenge. Who's That Pokémon?: Yanma
282	279	6	"A Poached Ego!" (Team Rocket! Goodbye to a Disturbed Scratch!!); Transliteration: "Roketto-dan! Midare Hikkagi de Sayōnara!!" (Japanese: ロケット団! みだれひっかきでサヨウナラ!!)	December 26, 2002	February 7, 2004
Team Rocket encounters a poacher who hunts for poison-type Pokémon. When Team Rocket learn that the captured Pokémon include Koffing and Ekans, they decide to free them from the poacher's grasp and they release Arbok and Weezing to protect Ekans and Koffing. At the end, James gets himself a new Pokémon; Cacnea. Who's That Pokémon?: Larvitar
283	280	7	"Tree's a Crowd" (Forest of Kimori! Protect the Giant Tree!!); Transliteration: "Kimori no Mori! Kyodaiju o Mamore!!" (Japanese: キモリの森! 巨大樹を守れ!!)	January 9, 2003	February 14, 2004
A group of Hoeen Grass-type Starter Pokémon Treecko are defending a dying tree, and one of them decides to join Ash's party. Who's That Pokémon?: Girafarig
284	281	8	"A Tail with a Twist" (Habunake vs. Kimori! Strike of Death!!); Transliteration: "Habuneku Tai Kimori! Hissatsu no Hataku Kōgeki!!" (Japanese: ハブネークVSキモリ! 必殺のはたく攻撃!!)	January 16, 2003	February 21, 2004
Ash's Treecko gets beaten by a wild Seviper known for its bullying habits. While Treecko tries to prepare harder for the rematch, Jessie sets her eye on the Seviper, and later captures it. Who's That Pokémon?: Gligar
285	282	9	"Taming of the Shroomish" (Bizarre! Mystery of the Kinococo Mansion!); Transliteration: "Kaiki! Kinokoko Yashiki no Nazo!" (Japanese: 怪奇! キノココ屋敷の謎!)	January 23, 2003	February 28, 2004
In an alley, Max meets and befriends a Shroomish. Who's That Pokémon?: Snubbull
286	283	10	"You Said a Mouthful!" (The Strongest Pelipper in History Appears!!); Transliteration: "Shijō Saikyō no Perippā Arawareru!!" (Japanese: 史上最強のペリッパー現る!!)	January 30, 2003	March 6, 2004
Ash faces a trainer and his Pelipper, which can use attacks it cannot normally learn! Who's That Pokémon?: Unown
287	284	11	"A Bite to Remember" (Guraena and Pochiena! Mystery of Evolution!!); Transliteration: "Guraena to Pochiena! Shinka no Shinpi!!" (Japanese: グラエナとポチエナ! 進化の神秘!!)	February 6, 2003	March 13, 2004
Max cares for a Poochyena so it can evolve and be free. Who's That Pokémon?: Hitmontop
288	285	12	"The Lotad Lowdown" (Hassboh and the Three Sisters of the Flower Shop!); Transliteration: "Hasubō to Furawā Shoppu no San-Shimai!" (Japanese: ハスボーとフラワーショップの三姉妹!)	February 13, 2003	March 20, 2004
Brock is successful at catching himself a Lotad. Who's That Pokémon?: Magby
289	286	13	"All Things Bright and Beautifly!" (Pokémon Contest! Agehunt's Magnificent Battle!!); Transliteration: "Pokemon Kontesuto! Agehanto no Karei na Batoru!!" (Japanese: ポケモンコンテスト! アゲハントの華麗なバトル!!)	February 20, 2003	March 27, 2004
Ash's group have their first look at a Pokémon Contest. Who's That Pokémon?: Magcargo
290	287	14	"All in a Day's Wurmple" (Double Battle and Double Kemusso!?); Transliteration: "Daburu Batoru to Daburu de Kemusso!?" (Japanese: ダブルバトルとダブルでケムッソ!?)	February 27, 2003	April 3, 2004
Having been amazed by the Beautifly's performance at the Pokémon Contest, May hunts down a Wurmple so she can have her own Beautifly. Who's That Pokémon?: Lugia
291	288	15	"Gonna Rule the School!" (Try to Study! Pokémon Trainer's School!!); Transliteration: "Benkyō-shimasu! Pokemon Torēnāzu Sukūru!!" (Japanese: 勉強します! ポケモントレーナーズスクール!!)	March 6, 2003	April 10, 2004
Ash and his friends arrive at a Pokémon Trainer School, which is headed by Roxanne, Rustboro's Gym Leader. Max enters a school battle against a rude boy. Who's That Pokémon?: Croconaw
292	289	16	"The Winner by a Nosepass" (Kanazumi Gym! Nosepass's Secret Weapon!!); Transliteration: "Kanazumi Jimu! Nozupasu no Himitsu Heiki!!" (Japanese: カナズミジム! ノズパスの秘密兵器!!)	March 13, 2003	April 17, 2004
Ash and Roxanne have their Gym Battle, while May announces her intentions to compete in Pokémon Contests instead. Who's That Pokémon?: Pupitar
293	290	17	"Stairway to Devon" (Devon Corporation! Shadow of Team Aqua!!); Transliteration: "Debon Kōporēshon! Akua-dan no Kage!!" (Japanese: デボンコーポレーション! アクア団の影!!)	March 20, 2003	April 24, 2004
Max accidentally spills his drink onto the Pokénav, causing it to spoil. He needs to find a place to have it quickly fixed while letting nobody know it's spoiled. He ends up meeting with the president of the Devon Corporation, makers of the Pokénav and everything else. The president offers to help Max repair the Pokénav, but the corporate tour into headquarters turns into a hunt for a spy from Team Aqua who is after the research, and they learn about two evil teams in the Hoenn region; Team Aqua and Team Magma. Who's That Pokémon?: Slugma
294	291	18	"On a Wingull and a Prayer!" (Old Man Hagi and Peeko the Camome!); Transliteration: "Hagi-rōjin to Kyamome no Pīko-chan!" (Japanese: ハギ老人とキャモメのピーコちゃん!)	March 27, 2003	May 1, 2004
On a hunt for a boat to Dewford Town, May encounters an old sailor named Briney. However, the Team Aqua spy is still on the loose, also looking for a ship out of the city. Who's That Pokémon?: Sentret
295	292	19	"Sharpedo Attack!" (Escape! Samehader's Island!!); Transliteration: "Dasshutsu! Samehadā no Shima!!" (Japanese: 脱出! サメハダーの島!!)	April 3, 2003	May 8, 2004
As Mr. Briney takes the gang to the closest Island, they are attacked by a gang of Sharpedo and are forced to stay on a deserted island. They must convince the Sharpedo that they do not want to harm them and also protect those same Pokémon from Team Rocket. Who's That Pokémon?: Igglybuff
296	293	20	"Brave the Wave" (Muro Gym! The Surfing Leader – Touki Appears!); Transliteration: "Muro Jimu! Naminori ri Jimu Rīdā, Tōki Tōjō!" (Japanese: ムロジム! 波乗りジムリーダー・トウキ登場!)	April 10, 2003	May 15, 2004
Eager to win the Knuckle Badge, Ash goes straight to challenge Brawly, the Gym Leader of Dewford Town. However, Ash loses patience when Brawly goes surfing instead of battling. Finally, he gets his match, where Brawly's Makuhita evolves into Hariyama. Who's That Pokémon?: Delibird
297	294	21	"Which Wurmple's Which?" (Kemusso vs. Kemusso! Which is Which!?); Transliteration: "Kemusso Tai Kemusso! Dotchi ga Dotchi!?" (Japanese: ケムッソVSケムッソ! どっちがどっち!?)	April 17, 2003	May 22, 2004
After James tricks Ash and friends into fishing in an area so that Team Rocket can commit their usual schemes, the two sides battle until May sends out her Wurmple. Jessie argues with May, and the two battle, during which Meowth bumps into the two Wurmples. May and Jessie both take one and soon after Pikachu blasts Team Rocket off again, but then May finds out that the Wurmple she took isn't her Wurmple! Who's That Pokémon?: Espeon
298	295	22	"A Hole Lotta Trouble" (Daigo, Cockodora and Bossgodora!); Transliteration: "Daigo, Kokodora, Bosugodora!" (Japanese: ダイゴ、ココドラ、ボスゴドラ!)	April 24, 2003	May 29, 2004
Team Rocket digs another hole, this time in Granite Cave, to capture the "twerps" but it only succeeds in separating everyone - including Team Rocket! Who's That Pokémon?: Vigoroth
299	296	23	"Gone Corphishin'" (Roughneck of the Sea, Heigani Appears!); Transliteration: "Umibe no Abare Mono, Heigani Tōjō!" (Japanese: 海辺の暴れ者、ヘイガニ登場!)	May 1, 2003	June 5, 2004
Ash chases down a mysterious Pokémon that keeps assaulting people on a small inlet on a far side of Dewford Island. Who's That Pokémon?: Shroomish
300	297	24	"A Corphish Out of Water" (Run Satoshi! Cross the Kibanha River!); Transliteration: "Hashire Satoshi! Kibania no Kawa o Koe!" (Japanese: 走れサトシ! キバニアの川を越え!)	May 8, 2003	June 12, 2004
The gang encounters Team Rocket, and Corphish is injured following a battle. Ash must rush his newest Pokémon to the Pokémon Center on Dewford Island, which is surrounded by a school of hungry Carvanha. Who's That Pokémon?: Beautifly
301	298	25	"A Mudkip Mission" (The Secret Pond! Full of Mizugorou!?); Transliteration: "Himitsu no Ike! Mizugorō Ga Ippai!?" (Japanese: 秘密の池! ミズゴロウがいっぱい!?)	May 15, 2003	June 19, 2004
While in training, Ash and the others stumble upon a lake full of Hoenn Water-type Starter Pokémon Mudkip under the watchful eye of an old man who is the protector of the Mudkip in the lake. Brock also catches a Mudkip of his own. Who's That Pokémon?: Pelipper
302	299	26	"Turning Over a Nuzleaf" (Attack of the Konohana Tribe!!); Transliteration: "Konohana-zoku no Shūgeki!!" (Japanese: コノハナ族の襲撃!!)	May 22, 2003	June 26, 2004
While walking through Granite Cave, the gang stumble upon a Loudred in the middle of a long sleep. When it is accidentally woken, the gang are forced to run and find themselves separated from Pikachu, Treecko, Torchic, Mudkip, Silcoon, Lotad and Corphish. While the worried trainers search, the Pokémon begin to fight among themselves until they find themselves attacked by a group of Nuzleaf. Who's That Pokémon?: Treecko
303	300	27	"A Three Team Scheme!" (Team Magma vs. Team Aqua! Secret Base Battle!); Transliteration: "Maguma-dan Tai Akua-dan! Himitsu Kichi no Tatakai!" (Japanese: マグマ団VSアクア団! ひみつきちの戦い!)	May 29, 2003	July 10, 2004
Ash and his friends accidentally stumble upon another Pokémon Trainer's Secret Base. Meanwhile, Team Aqua and Team Magma both attempt to take over the Secret Base and wind up in battle with one another. Who's That Pokémon?: Zigzagoon
304	301	28	"Seeing is Believing!" (Agehunt and Dokucale! The Final Evolution!); Transliteration: "Agehanto to Dokukeiru! Shinka no Hate ni!" (Japanese: アゲハントとドクケイル! 進化の果てに!)	June 5, 2003	July 17, 2004
May and Jessie both blissfully await the day when they shall receive a Beautifly. However, Jessie is unaware that she will never have one because her Wurmple became a Cascoon (which will evolve into a Dustox) instead of a Silcoon...and she refuses to hear otherwise! To force it to evolve, she makes it battle May's Silcoon. Who's That Pokémon?: Wurmple
305	302	29	"Ready, Willing and Sableye" (The Startling Yamirami!); Transliteration: "Yamirami de Tokkiri!" (Japanese: ヤミラミでドッキリ!)	June 12, 2003	July 24, 2004
Corphish's bad attitude showing no signs of improving so Ash plans to humble it a bit by putting a good scare into it deep inside an abandoned mine. Little does he know, however, that Team Rocket have already infiltrated the mine, and none of them know that there's something else in the darkness waiting for them! Who's That Pokémon?: Nosepass
306	303	30	"A Meditite Fight!" (Asanan and the Battle Girl! In the Middle of a Storm!); Transliteration: "Batoru Gāru to Asanan! Arashi no Naka de!" (Japanese: バトルガールとアサナン! 嵐の中で!)	June 19, 2003	July 31, 2004
Ash and friends get caught in a hurricane and must take a treacherous mountain path to reach safety. Also, Ash meets up with a Meditite trainer called Shauna. Who's That Pokémon?: Mudkip
307	304	31	"Just One of the Geysers" (Muro Gym Rematch! Surfing Battlefield!); Transliteration: "Muro Jimu Saisen! Naminori Batoru Fīrudo!" (Japanese: ムロジム再戦! 波乗りバトルフィールド!)	June 26, 2003	August 7, 2004
Ash's long-awaited rematch with Brawly of the Dewford Gym finally arrives. For the location, Brawly selects a secret sparring area he has hidden on a nearby island. Above and beyond this Gym Leader's ability and powerful Pokémon, the battlefield itself presents many unique challenges, most notably a huge geyser that erupts into the air without warning. Who's That Pokémon?: Persian
308	305	32	"Abandon Ship!" (The Abandoned Ship! The Creeping Shadow!!); Transliteration: "Suterare Fune! Shinobiyoru Kage!!" (Japanese: すてられ船! しのびよる影!!)	July 3, 2003	August 14, 2004
Ash and friends foil a kidnapping scheme by Team Rocket on the high seas, but are then left high and dry themselves when Team Rocket's boat breaks down. Drifting with the tide, they eventually come to rest against an abandoned ship. On board, they meet Tommy, one of the ship's original passengers, who has returned to search for the Marshtomp he was separated from when the ship first ran aground. Who's That Pokémon?: Silcoon
309	306	33	"Now That's Flower Power!" (A New Rival for Haruka! Intensive Pokémon Contest Training!!); Transliteration: "Haruka ni Raibaru! Tokkun Pokemon Kontesuto!!" (Japanese: ハルカにライバル! 特訓ポケモンコンテスト!!)	July 10, 2003	August 21, 2004
As May prepares for the first upcoming Pokémon Contest, a retired coordinator named Mr. Big compliments her battling skills. He invites her and her friends to his house where he keeps some items that could prove helpful to May's performance. Who's That Pokémon?: Dragonite
310	307	34	"Having a Wailord of a Time" (The Big Starter Pokémon Panic!!); Transliteration: "Hajimete no Pokemon de Dai Panikku!!" (Japanese: はじめてのポケモンで大パニック!!)	July 17, 2003	August 28, 2004
Impressed at how well they had raised their own Pokémon, Nurse Joy enlists Ash and Max to babysit Treecko, Mudkip, and Torchic awaiting a Pokémon Trainer just about to begin her first journey. Torchic proves to be the most rambunctious of the group, and when Ash sends several of his Pokémon to gently coax it into obedience, he inadvertently causes the troublesome chick to evolve into a Combusken. Who's That Pokémon?: Lotad
311	308	35	"Win, Lose or Drew!" (Haruka! The First Pokémon Contest Challenge!!); Transliteration: "Haruka! Pokemon Kontesuto Hatsu Chōsen!!" (Japanese: ハルカ! ポケモンコンテスト初挑戦!!)	July 24, 2003	September 4, 2004
May arrives in Slateport City, where she can compete in her first Pokémon contest. Also competing is May's new rival, Drew, and a young man named Robert who uses Milotic...but May soon learns that Pokémon Contests teach hard and painful lessons. Meanwhile, Team Rocket learns the secrets of Pokémon Block. Who's That Pokémon?: Dustox
312	309	36	"The Spheal of Approval" (Protect the Ocean Museum! Attack of Team Magma!!); Transliteration: "Umi no Hakubutsukan o Mamore! Maguma-dan no Shūgeki!!" (Japanese: 海の博物館を守れ! マグマ団の襲撃!!)	July 31, 2003	September 11, 2004
Having at long last completed her Pokémon Contest, May suggests a day of recreation in Slateport City before moving on. While she and Brock shop in the city's famous market district, Ash and Max check out a local marine museum. However, what should have been a day of leisure turns into one battle after another as both Team Rocket and Team Magma storm the very same museum in search of a rare rock discovered on the ocean floor. Who's That Pokémon?: Nuzleaf
313	310	37	"Jump for Joy!" (Beauty and the Beast!? Dirteng and Nurse Joy!); Transliteration: "Bijo to Yajū!? Dātengu to Jōi-san!" (Japanese: 美女と野獣!? ダーテングとジョーイさん!)	August 7, 2003	September 18, 2004
While cutting through a mountain pass, Ash and friends decide to stop into the local Pokémon Center for directions, only to discover it has been vacated, with no sign of Nurse Joy. The gant take it upon themselves to investigate and discover security camera footage of a Shiftry immobilizing Joy with Sleeping Powder before carrying her off. Their only clue as to Joy's location is a mysterious Pokédex entry, indicating that these Pokémon inhabit only trees that are over 1,000 years old. Who's That Pokémon?: Seedot
314	311	38	"A Different Kind of Misty" (Prasle and Minun! The Mountain Lighthouse!!); Transliteration: "Purasuru to Mainan! Yama no Tōdai!!" (Japanese: プラスルとマイナン! 山の灯台!!)	August 14, 2003	September 25, 2004
When Ash and friends get lost in a dark and foggy mountain pass, the first people they meet are Team Rocket, fresh from their latest heist. Ash and friends manage to recover the stone the trio had stolen from a nearby lighthouse, but only to be themselves mistaken for the thieves. Who's That Pokémon?: Loudred
315	312	39	"A Poké-BLOCK Party" (Sing! Pokémon Trick House!!); Transliteration: "Utau! Pokemon Karakuri Yashiki!!" (Japanese: 歌う! ポケモンからくり屋敷!!)	August 21, 2003	October 2, 2004
Ash and friends finally reach Mauville City, but is forced to wait a bit longer for his next Gym battle as the gang see an advert for a Pokémon Trick House Contest, offering anyone who makes it through with a one year supply of Poké-block. May is eager to win the prize, so the gang decide to enter, and meet up with a girl called Alanna and her Whismur. But when Jigglypuff decides to perform its song, things may get complicated for the gang and Team Rocket too. Who's That Pokémon?: Seviper
316	313	40	"Watt's with Wattson" (Kinsetsu Gym! Tessen's Electric Shock Battle!!); Transliteration: "Kinsetsu Jimu! Tessen no Dengeki Batoru!!" (Japanese: キンセツジム! テッセンの電撃バトル!!)	August 28, 2003	October 2, 2004
Ash's third Gym battle with the electric master Wattson is full of surprises when, after an encounter with a robotic Raikou, Pikachu wins the match alone with super-charged Thunderbolts. However Ash's joy at receiving the badge disappears when Pikachu turns ill, and a depressed Wattson leaves Mauville City convinced he is a weak Gym Leader. Who's That Pokémon?: Meditite

== Music ==
The Japanese opening song is "Advance Adventure" (アドバンスアドベンチャー, Adobansu Adobenchā) by GARDEN for 40 episodes. The ending songs are "Because the Sky is There" (そこに空があるから, Soko ni Sora ga Aru Kara) by Toshiko Ezaki for 18 episodes, and "Polka O Dolka" (ポルカ・ドルカ, Poruka O Doruka) by Inuko Inuyama (Meowth) and Nolsol Chorus Group for 22 episodes, and the English opening song is "I Wanna Be a Hero" by David Rolfe. A shortened version of the English opening song was used for the end credits.

== Critical reception ==
Themanime.org gave a positive review saying that "the anime does stuff from the video games in this season" and that "May isn't just a replacement of Misty." Movie Reviews Simbasible gave a negative review saying that "the new characters are actually more annoying instead of likeable" and that "it ended up being a bore but with some very good episodes." Alfah, writing for Pokeblog gave a positive review, giving the season a 8/10 and saying that "It's an awesome start to the Advanced Generation series, showing growth of two protagonists, Ash and May. Other than Max's bratty attitude, this is an awesome season: a definite must-watch."

== Home media ==
In the United States, Viz Video and Ventura Distribution released the series on 8 VHS and DVD volumes from 2004–2005. The entire series was released on DVD, while the VHS versions only featured the first three episodes from each release.

Viz Media later released two 3-disc boxed DVD sets in 2005 and 2006, containing 6-7 episodes per disc.

Viz Media and Warner Home Video released Pokémon: Advanced – The Complete Collection on DVD in the United States on May 16, 2017.
