= Pokémon: Master Quest =

Fifth season of the Pokémon animated television series

- Season 5
- English DVD Cover
- No. of episodes: 65 (Japanese version); 64 (English version)

Release
- Original network: TV Tokyo
- Original release: August 9, 2001 – November 14, 2002

Season chronology
- ← Previous; Johto League Champions Next → Advanced

Pokémon: Master Quest is the fifth season of the Pokémon anime series and the third and final season of Pokémon the Series: Gold and Silver, known in Japan as Pocket Monsters (ポケットモンスター, Poketto Monsutā). (Note: For the DVD release, the title was changed to Pocket Monsters: Episode Gold & Silver (ポケットモンスター金銀編, Poketto Monsutā Kin Gin Hen)) It originally aired in Japan from August 9, 2001, to November 14, 2002, on TV Tokyo, in the United States from September 14, 2002, to October 25, 2003, on Kids' WB. It was the first season of Pokémon to be digitally animated as opposed to cel animation, starting with the episode "Here's Lookin' at You, Elekid".

The season follows Ash Ketchum as he continues travelling across the Johto region with Misty and Brock.

The episodes were directed by Masamitsu Hidaka and produced by the animation studio OLM.

== Episode list ==
Jap. overall	Eng. overall	No. in season	English title Japanese title	Original release date	English air date
212	210	1	"Around the Whirlpool" (The Whirlpool Islands! A New Challenge!!); Transliteration: "Uzumaki Rettō! Aratanaru Chōsen!!" (Japanese: うずまきれっとう! あらたなるちょうせん!!)	August 9, 2001	September 14, 2002
In a scuffle with Team Rocket, Ash and friends are thrown from the ship taking them to the Whirl Islands. They crash into Blue Point Isle, where they meet up with Professor Elm, who explains about the upcoming Whirl Cup that takes place in the center of the Whirl Islands. Who's That Pokémon?: Houndoom
213	211	2	"Fly Me to the Moon" (Poppo and the Enormous Poppo! Towards the As Yet Unseen Sky!!); Transliteration: "Poppo to Deka Poppo! Mada Minu Sora e!!" (Japanese: ポッポとデカポッポ! まだみぬそらへ!!)	August 16, 2001	September 21, 2002
On Pudgy Pidgey Isle, where all Pidgey have grown large and lazy, our heroes discover one Pidgey who dreams of flying higher than any Pokémon in history. Who's That Pokémon?: Magmar
214	212	3	"Takin' It on the Chinchou!" (Set Out to the Sea! Line of Chonchie!!); Transliteration: "Tabidate Umi e! Chonchī Gyōretsu!!" (Japanese: たびだてうみへ! チョンチーぎょうれつ!!)	August 23, 2001	September 28, 2002
In Blue Lagoon, Ash and friends are fortunate enough to pass a small mountain village just as an annual Chinchou migration is about to occur. Who's That Pokémon?: Smoochum
215	213	4	"A Corsola Caper!" (Sunnygo the Amigo! Showdown on Yellow Rock Isle!!); Transliteration: "Sanīgo de Amīgo! Ō Gantō no Taiketsu!!" (Japanese: サニーゴでアミーゴ! おうがんとうのたいけつ!!)	August 30, 2001	October 5, 2002
Just as Ash and friends arrive on Yellow Rock Isle, they find themselves in the middle of the Corsola frenzy and Misty hopes to catch one of her own. Who's That Pokémon?: Electabuzz
216	214	5	"Mantine Overboard!" (Mantain and the Sunken Ship!! The Secret of the Mysterious Pokémon!); Transliteration: "Mantain to Chinbotsusen!! Nazo no Pokemon no Himitsu!" (Japanese: マンタインとちんぼつせん!! なぞのポケモンのひみつ!)	September 6, 2001	October 12, 2002
Ash and friends meet a Pokémon researcher named Luka who is desperate to explore a sunken ship, a ship that's fiercely protected by an aggressive Mantine and a number of Remoraid. Who's That Pokémon?: Alakazam
217	215	6	"Octillery the Outcast" (Okutank and Teppouo! Whirlpool Cup Preliminaries!!); Transliteration: "Okutan to Teppouo! Uzumaki Kappu Yosen!!" (Japanese: オクタンとテッポウオ! うずまきカップよせん!!)	September 13, 2001	October 19, 2002
After reaching Scarlet City on Red Rock Isle, where the preliminary round of the Whirl Cup is held, Ash and Misty must help cheer up a young trainer called Marcellus, after his Octillery is feeling lonely and isolated from its companions following evolution. Who's That Pokémon?: Jumpluff
218	216	7	"Dueling Heroes" (Whirlpool Cup! A Big Battle in the Water Colosseum!!); Transliteration: "Uzumaki Kappu! Mizu no Koroshiamu de Daibatoru!!" (Japanese: うずまきカップ! みずのコロシアムでだいバトル!!)	September 20, 2001	October 26, 2002
Ash and Misty advance to the second round of the Whirl Cup finals. Who's That Pokémon?: Aipom
219	217	8	"The Perfect Match!" (Satoshi vs. Kasumi! The Final Battle in the Whirlpool Cup!!); Transliteration: "Satoshi Tai Kasumi! Uzumaki Kappu Saigo no Tatakai!!" (Japanese: サトシVSカスミ! うずまきカップさいごのたたかい!!)	September 27, 2001	November 2, 2002
Ash faces off against Misty in the Whirl Cup. Who will win? Who's That Pokémon?: Marill
220	218	9	"Plant It Now... Diglett Later" (Protect the Digda Village! The Big Pitfall Strategy!?); Transliteration: "Diguda no Mura o Mamore! Otoshiana Daisakusen!?" (Japanese: ディグダのむらをまもれ! おとしあなだいさくせん!?)	October 4, 2001	November 9, 2002
A village of kind, elderly people requests that Ash and friends help them defend against a gang of marauders that invades every year, attempting to rustle their sizable herd of Diglett. Who's That Pokémon?: Sandshrew
221	219	10	"Hi Ho Silver... Away!" (The Legend of Silver Wings! Battle at Silver Rock Island!!); Transliteration: "Gin'iro no Hane no Densetsu! Gin Gantō no Tatakai!!" (Japanese: ぎんいろのはねのでんせつ! ぎんがんとうのたたかい!!)	October 11, 2001	November 16, 2002
Ash, Misty and Brock run into a local shopkeeper on Silver Rock Isle called Ariene who introduces them to one of her friends, a jewelry maker called Jenaro who tells them the legend of a mysterious Pokémon on Ogi Isle. Who's That Pokémon?: Charmander
222	220	11	"The Mystery Is History" (Mysterious Pokémon X!!); Transliteration: "Nazono Pokemon X!!" (Japanese: なぞのポケモンX!!)	October 18, 2001	November 23, 2002
On Ogi Isle, Ash, Misty, and Brock run into their old friend Ritchie and his Pikachu, Sparky. They also meet a young boy whose Lanturn has made friends with a baby Lugia. Who's That Pokémon?: Spearow
223	221	12	"A Parent Trapped!" (The Captive Lugia); Transliteration: "Torawareno Rugia" (Japanese: とらわれのルギア)	October 25, 2001	November 30, 2002
Professor Nanba of Team Rocket uses Silver as bait to capture its mother Lugia. Ash, Brock, Misty, and Ritchie are held captive in Team Rocket's underwater base. Who's That Pokémon?: Dragonite
224	222	13	"A Promise is a Promise" (The Promise with Lugia!); Transliteration: "Rugia to no Yakusoku!" (Japanese: ルギアとのやくそく!)	November 1, 2001	December 7, 2002
Ash and his friends try to fight their way out of the underwater Team Rocket base as they attempt to free both the baby Lugia and its mother. Team Rocket is working on a device that makes Pokémon angry and brings out power through rage which may prove to be dangerous for Ash and his friends. Who's That Pokémon?: Exeggutor
225	223	14	"Throwing in the Noctowl" (Fly Flight Hoho! Head for Asagi!!); Transliteration: "Tobe Hōhō-gō! Asagi o Mezashi!!" (Japanese: とべホーホーごう! アサギをめざし!!)	November 8, 2001	December 14, 2002
After missing the ferry, Ash and his friends meet an elderly man called Wings Alexander who pilots a plane that will bring Ash back to Olivine City but the plane's current state of disrepair along with dangerous storms may stop Ash from fulfilling his promise of getting to Olivine City in time for his gym battle. Who's That Pokémon?: Mankey
226	224	15	"Nerves of Steelix!" (Asagi Gym! Vs. Haganeil!!); Transliteration: "Asagi Jimu! Tai Haganēru!!" (Japanese: アサギジム! VSハガネール!!)	November 15, 2001	December 21, 2002
Ash's long-waited battle against Jasmine, the Olivine City's Gym Leader, finally begins as he and his party find themselves facing Jasmine's most powerful Pokémon, Steelix. Who's That Pokémon?: Granbull
227	225	16	"Bulbasaur... the Ambassador!" (Farewell, Fushigidane! Adventure at Dr. Okido's!!); Transliteration: "Sayonara Fushigidane! Ōkido-tei no Bōken" (Japanese: さよならフシギダネ! オーキドていのぼうけん!!)	November 22, 2001	September 23, 2002
Bulbasaur leaves for Professor Oak's lab to solve a conflict between all kinds of Pokémon. Will Ash be forced to leave his Bulbasaur at Professor Oak's lab forever? Who's That Pokémon?: Arbok
228	226	17	"Espeon, Not Included" (Eifie and Sakura! Enju City Once Again!!); Transliteration: "Ēfi to Sakura! Enju Shitei Futatabi!!" (Japanese: エーフィとサクラ! エンジュシティふたたび!!)	November 29, 2001	September 24, 2002
Returning to Ecruteak City, Ash, Misty and Brock encounter Sakura and her Kimono Girl sisters again, and learn that Sakura's Eevee became an Espeon. Who's That Pokémon?: Drowzee
229	227	18	"For Ho-Oh the Bells Toll!" (Suikun and Minaki! The Legend of Houou!!); Transliteration: "Suikun to Minaki! Hōō no Densetsu!!" (Japanese: スイクンとミナキ! ホウオウのでんせつ!!)	December 6, 2001	September 25, 2002
When Ash tells Eusine, a specialist in legendary Pokémon, that he saw a Suicune, a Pokémon Eusine is trying to catch, Eusine demands a battle. Meanwhile, Team Rocket steals and then breaks a sacred bell, causing all the Pokémon in the area to attack the forest, Ecruteak City and all the people in it. Who's That Pokémon?: Caterpie
230	228	19	"Extreme Pokémon!" (Run Quickly Along the Pokémon Ride!!); Transliteration: "Pokemon Raido de Tsuppashire!!" (Japanese: ポケモンライドでつっぱしれ!!)	December 13, 2001	January 4, 2003
Ash and his Bayleef compete in a Pokémon racing competition against Gary and his Arcanine. Who's That Pokémon?: Mr. Mime
231	229	20	"An EGG-sighting Adventure!" (Famous Detective Junsar! The Mystery of the Disappeared Egg!!); Transliteration: "Meitantei Junsā! Kieta Tamago no Nazo!!" (Japanese: めいたんていジュンサー! きえたタマゴのなぞ!!)	December 20, 2001	January 11, 2003
Ash wins an egg as a prize for the race, and wonders what it will hatch into. The Egg eventually gets stolen, and Ash is on the case on who took it! Who's That Pokémon?: Blissey
232	230	21	"Hatching a Plan" (Egg, Hatch); Transliteration: "Tamago, Kaeru" (Japanese: タマゴ、かえる)	December 27, 2001	January 18, 2003
Ash's egg hatches into a Phanpy but runs away after Pikachu accidentally shocks it while in a battle with Team Rocket. Who's That Pokémon?: Seadra
233	231	22	"Dues and Don'ts" (Rocket-dan and Delibird!); Transliteration: "Roketto-dan to Deribādo!" (Japanese: ロケットだんとデリバード!)	January 10, 2002	January 25, 2003
Jessie, James and Meowth find out that their contracts have expired, so they are no longer part of Team Rocket. An old woman who's recruiting for Team Rocket lends them her Delibird to pass the recruitment test...attacking Ash and his friends! They lose the battle, but are reinstated into Team Rocket, and the Delibird is assigned to follow the three so they can pay off their bills little by little. Meanwhile a Team Rocket member craves revenge on Jessie. Who's That Pokémon?: Smeargle
234	232	23	"Just Waiting On a Friend" (The Kyukon in the Fog!); Transliteration: "Kiri no Naka no Kyūkon!" (Japanese: きりのなかのキュウコン!)	January 17, 2002	September 26, 2002
Ash, Brock and Misty rest in a house occupied by a girl called Lokoko. The original master of the house went missing long before. Brock falls for Lokoko, but Ash and Misty discover she has no reflection in the mirror! The two soon discover that Lokoko is really an illusion created by a Ninetales. Who's That Pokémon?: Sudowoodo
235	233	24	"A Tyrogue Full of Trouble" (Balkie and the Karate King Nobuhiko!); Transliteration: "Barukī to Karateō Nobuhiko!" (Japanese: バルキーとからておうノブヒコ!)	January 24, 2002	February 1, 2003
The three friends discover a Tyrogue who is cold to humans, but on the inside, is sensitive and cares for weak Pokémon. Who's That Pokémon?: Spinarak
236	234	25	"Xatu the Future" (Natio's Big Prediction!); Transliteration: "Neitio no Daiyogen!" (Japanese: ネイティオのだいよげん!)	January 31, 2002	February 8, 2003
A girl called Calista uses her Xatu's ability to see the future as an advantage and uses this to predict the weather. The Xatu are not always correct, and convince her into thinking there is going to be a flood. Who's That Pokémon?: Ledian
237	235	26	"Talkin' 'Bout an Evolution" (Wataru and the Red Gyarados!); Transliteration: "Wataru to Akai Gyaradosu!" (Japanese: ワタルとあかいギャラドス!)	February 7, 2002	February 15, 2003
Ash, Misty and Brock are walking along, when suddenly, they spot a mysterious Pokémon, a red Gyarados. They discover it is one of many Magikarp that has been forced to evolve by Team Rocket. With the help of Lance, the Kanto League Champion, Ash and friends attempt to rescue Gyarados. Who's That Pokémon?: Marowak
238	236	27	"Rage of Innocence" (Red Gyarados's Anger!); Transliteration: "Akai Gyaradosu no Ikari!" (Japanese: あかいギャラドスのいかり!)	February 14, 2002	February 22, 2003
Lance attempts to rescue the red Gyarados by catching it. Can Lance catch it before it destroys Mahogany Town? Who's That Pokémon?: Dunsparce
239	237	28	"As Cold as Pryce" (Inomoo and Yanagi of the Winter!); Transliteration: "Inomū to Fuyu no Yanagi!" (Japanese: イノムーとふゆのヤナギ!)	February 21, 2002	March 1, 2003
Pryce, with Ash's help, attempts to locate his lost Piloswine. Who's That Pokémon?: Magneton
240	238	29	"Nice Pryce, Baby!" (Chouji Gym! Ice Battle!); Transliteration: "Chōji Jimu! Kōri no Tatakai!" (Japanese: チョウジジム! こおりのたたかい!)	February 28, 2002	March 8, 2003
Ash challenges Pryce of Mahogany Town to a battle. Who's That Pokémon?: Weedle
241	239	30	"Whichever Way the Wind Blows" (Kireihana and Ruffresia! Peace in Meadow!); Transliteration: "Kireihana to Rafureshia! Sōgen no Heiwa!" (Japanese: キレイハナとラフレシア! そうげんのへいわ!)	March 7, 2002	March 22, 2003
Ash and the gang get involved upon discovering that a group of Bellossom are feuding with a group of Vileplume. Who's That Pokémon?: Arcanine
242	240	31	"Some Like It Hot" (Magcargot! Getting the Hot Heart!!); Transliteration: "Magukarugo! Atsui Kokoro de Getto da ze!!" (Japanese: マグカルゴ! あついこころでゲットだぜ!!)	March 14, 2002	March 29, 2003
Ash and friends encounter a Magcargo that refuses to let them pass. A boy named Egan attempts to capture a Magcargo for himself. Who's That Pokémon?: Mantine
243	241	32	"Hocus Pokémon" (A Huge Transformation with Pokémon Magic!?); Transliteration: "Pokemon Mahō de Daihenshin!?" (Japanese: ポケモンまほうでだいへんしん!?)	March 21, 2002	April 5, 2003
A Pokémon magician named Lily attempts to create a magic spell, but as well as needing Pikachu, is missing one ingredient; a tear from an Aipom. Team Rocket steals Lily's spell book and try to get Aipom to shed a tear without force. After beating Team Rocket, however, the spell fails and Ash gets turned into a Pikachu. Who's That Pokémon?: Dewgong
244	242	33	"As Clear as Crystal" (Thunder and the Crystal! Secret of the Lake!); Transliteration: "Sandā to Kurisutaru! Mizuumi no Himitsu!" (Japanese: サンダーとクリスタル! みずうみのひみつ!)	March 28, 2002	April 12, 2003
Ash is restored to his human form, but Pikachu doesn't look so hot. They discover he is ill, and so a passing trainer takes them to a lake to heal electric Pokémon. They find out that a crystal is healing them, and so when Team Rocket snags it, it summons an enraged Zapdos! Who's That Pokémon?: Kingdra
245	243	34	"Same Old Song and Dance" (Pupurin Twins vs. Purin! Singing Pokémon Concert!); Transliteration: "Futago no Pupurin Tai Purin! Utau Pokemon Konsāto!" (Japanese: ふたごのププリンVSプリン! うたうポケモンコンサート!)	April 11, 2002	April 19, 2003
A trainer called Brittany and her twin Igglybuff perform at a concert causing Jigglypuff to become jealous. Who's That Pokémon?: Yanma
246	244	35	"Enlighten Up!" (Yadon's Comprehension! Satoshi's Comprehension!); Transliteration: "Yadon no Satori! Satoshi no Satori!" (Japanese: ヤドンのさとり! サトシのさとり!)	April 18, 2002	April 26, 2003
Ash, Misty, Brock and Team Rocket train in a Slowpoke Temple. Who's That Pokémon?: Noctowl
247	245	36	"Will the Real Oak Please Stand Up?" (Fake Okido!? Pokémon Senryu Confrontation!!); Transliteration: "Nise Ōkido!? Pokemon Senryū Taiketsu!!" (Japanese: にせオーキド!? ポケモンせんりゅうたいけつ!!)	April 25, 2002	September 27, 2002
James disguises himself as Professor Oak to receive fame. Who's That Pokémon?: Corsola
248	246	37	"Wish Upon a Star Shape" (Py, Pippy and the Shooting Star!); Transliteration: "Pī to Pippi to Nagareboshi!" (Japanese: ピィとピッピとながれぼし!)	May 2, 2002	May 3, 2003
Phanpy attempts to reunite Cleffa with its family. However, a pair of paranormal investigators called the PMC want to claim the Cleffa as proof of Pokémon's alien origins. Who's That Pokémon?: Voltorb
249	247	38	"Outrageous Fortunes" (Nyorozo's Evolution!); Transliteration: "Nyorozo no Shinka!" (Japanese: ニョロゾのしんか!)	May 9, 2002	May 10, 2003
Before being recalled, Poliwhirl puts the King's Rock Ash won on its head. The next time Misty uses Poliwhirl in battle, the power of the King's Rock causes it to evolve into Politoed! Who's That Pokémon?: Pinsir
250	248	39	"One Trick Phony!" (Battle Park! Vs. Kamex, Lizardon, Fushigibana!); Transliteration: "Batoru Pāku! Tai Kamekkusu, Rizādon, Fushigibana!" (Japanese: バトルパーク! VSカメックス・リザードン・フシギバナ!)	May 16, 2002	May 17, 2003
Ash trains at a Battle Park against Blastoise, Charizard, and Venusaur, not knowing the trainers he's facing are Team Rocket in disguise. Who's That Pokémon?: Tauros
251	249	40	"I Politoed Ya So!" (Nyorotono's Cheerleading!); Transliteration: "Nyorotono no Chiarīdeingu!" (Japanese: ニョロトノのチアリーディング!)	May 23, 2002	May 24, 2003
Tammy, a cheerleader with winning ambitions on her mind gets her Politoed companion Bean mixed up with Misty's clapping, cheerful Politoed. Who's That Pokémon?: Totodile
252	— (Note: This episode was pulled from rotation in international broadcasts.)	41	The Ice Cave! Transliteration: "Kōri no Dōkutsu!" (Japanese: こおりのどうくつ!)	May 30, 2002	N/A
On their way through Ice Path, Brock gets a cold and cannot proceed.
253	250	42	"Beauty Is Skin Deep" (Ibuki and Miniryu!); Transliteration: "Ibuki to Miniryū!" (Japanese: イブキとミニリュウ!)	June 6, 2002	May 31, 2003
Clair, the Blackthorn City Gym Leader, is forced to go to a ritual involving the Dragon Fang, but also has to protect a Dratini. Who's That Pokémon?: Goldeen
254	251	43	"Fangs for Nothin'" (Fusube Gym's Dragon Fang!); Transliteration: "Fusube Jimu no Ryū no Kiba!" (Japanese: フスベジムのりゅうのきば!)	June 13, 2002	June 7, 2003
Ash and Clair begin their gym battle, while Team Rocket makes off with the Dragon Fang, tricking a Dragonite into believing they are protecting it. As such, Ash's fight with Clair is cancelled as they temporarily join forces and then set off to stop Team Rocket. Who's That Pokémon?: Octillery
255	252	44	"Great Bowls of Fire!" (Kairyu! Use Imperial Rage!); Transliteration: "Kairyū! Gekirin Hatsudō!" (Japanese: カイリュー! げきりんはつどう!)	June 20, 2002	June 14, 2003
When James accidentally lights a forest on fire using the Dragon Holy Land's Prayer Flame, his actions cause Dragonite, the Holy Land's Guardian to snap and go mad with rage. As a result, it becomes so consumed with rage that it begins to attack everything that gets in its way while also endangering the Pokémon that live in the Holy Land as well. With help from Liza and her Charizard, Charla, as well as Ash's own Charizard, Ash, Brock, Misty and Clair must find a way to stop Dragonite's rampage once and for all or risk having the Holy Land being completely destroyed for good. Who's That Pokémon?: Chinchou
256	253	45	"Better Eight Than Never" (Fusube Gym! The Final Badge!!); Transliteration: "Fusube Jimu! Saigo no Bajji!!" (Japanese: フスベジム! さいごのバッジ!!)	June 27, 2002	June 21, 2003
In his second rematch, Ash pits Snorlax, Pikachu and Charizard against Clair's Dragon-type Pokémon. Will Ash be victorious and finally get the right to qualify for the Johto League? Who's That Pokémon?: Muk
257	254	46	"Why? Wynaut!" (Sohnano!? Gym Badges and Sonans!!); Transliteration: "Sōnano!? Jimu Bajji to Sōnansu!!" (Japanese: ソーナノ!? ジムバッジとソーナンス!!)	July 4, 2002	June 28, 2003
Ash's badges are stolen by Team Rocket, which are then stolen by a wild Wynaut. Who's That Pokémon?: Steelix
258	255	47	"Just Add Water" (Ryugu Gym! Battle in the Water!); Transliteration: "Ryūgū Jimu! Mizu no Nakade Batoru da ze!" (Japanese: リュウグウジム! みずのなかでバトルだぜ!)	July 11, 2002	July 12, 2003
Ash, Misty, and Brock visit an unregistered Pokémon Gym called the Coastline Gym. The Gym specializes in water Pokémon, and both Ash and Misty want a battle with the Gym Leader, Dorian. Who's That Pokémon?: Rhydon
259	256	48	"Lapras of Luxury" (Laplace's Song!); Transliteration: "Rapurasu no Uta!" (Japanese: ラプラスのうた!)	July 18, 2002	July 26, 2003
When Professor Elm asks Ash and his friends to pick up a Pokémon egg from a marine research center and deliver it to him, Ash runs into a Lapras herd, with one of the family members being the same Lapras he caught in the Orange Islands. When Team Rocket try to capture the whole herd, it is up to the reunited duo to stop them. Who's That Pokémon?: Qwilfish
260	257	49	"Hatch Me If You Can" (Protecting the Egg! The Life Born in a Storm!); Transliteration: "Tamago o Mamore! Arashi no Naka de Umareta Inochi!" (Japanese: タマゴをまもれ! あらしのなかでうまれたいのち!)	July 25, 2002	August 9, 2003
The egg Professor Elm gave Ash hatches into a Pokémon named Larvitar. Who's That Pokémon?: Swinub
261	258	50	"Entei at Your Own Risk" (Entei and Friends of the Hot Spring!); Transliteration: "Entei to Onsen no Nakama-tachi!" (Japanese: エンテイとおんせんのなかまたち!)	August 1, 2002	August 16, 2003
A Trainer named Nelson scouts out a hot spring for wild Pokémon in an attempt to capture the legendary Pokémon, Entei. Who's That Pokémon?: Tyrogue
262	259	51	"A Crowning Achievement" (Yadoking! King's Symbol!); Transliteration: "Yadokingu! Ōja no Shirushi!" (Japanese: ヤドキング! おうじゃのしるし!)	August 8, 2002	August 23, 2003
A Slowpoke named Arthur attempts to evolve into a Slowking. Who's That Pokémon?: Kadabra: Note: This the last episode of the Pokémon anime to be animated with cel animation.
263	260	52	"Here's Lookin' at You, Elekid" (Nanako and Elekid!); Transliteration: "Nanako to Erekiddo!" (Japanese: ナナコとエレキッド!)	August 15, 2002	August 30, 2003
Casey meets up with Ash, and has her sights on Elekid, the pre-evolved form of Electabuzz. Who's That Pokémon?: Hypno: Note: This is the first episode of the Pokémon anime to be animated with digital ink and paint.
264	261	53	"You're a Star, Larvitar!" (Do Your Best, Yogiras!); Transliteration: "Yōgirasu Ganbaru!" (Japanese: ヨーギラスがんばる!)	August 22, 2002	September 6, 2003
Ash relies on Larvitar to help free the Pokémon that Team Rocket has stolen. Who's That Pokémon?: Entei
265	262	54	"Address Unown!" (Unknown of the Country of Mystery); Transliteration: "Fushigi no Kuni no Annōn" (Japanese: ふしぎのくにのアンノーン)	August 29, 2002	September 13, 2003
Unown accidentally teleports Ash, Misty, Brock, Pikachu and Togepi (the latter two, humorously, grow to giant sizes) into Larvitar's mind, and they discover that as an egg, Larvitar and its mother were attacked by poachers. Who's That Pokémon?: Moltres
266	263	55	"Mother of All Battles" (Bangiras and Yogiras!); Transliteration: "Bangirasu to Yōgirasu!" (Japanese: バンギラスとヨーギラス!)	September 5, 2002	September 15, 2003
The same poachers that once captured Larvitar catch its mother. Who's That Pokémon?: Shuckle
267	264	56	"Pop Goes the Sneasel" (Nyula and the Sacred Flame!); Transliteration: "Nyūra to Seinaru Honō!" (Japanese: ニューラとせいなるほのお!)	September 12, 2002	September 16, 2003
Ash meets a Trainer named Harrison from Littleroot Town in the Hoenn region. The two help out to battle a Sneasel, a Machop and a Machoke, who are interfering with the opening ceremony for the Johto League Conference. Who's That Pokémon?: Elekid
268	265	57	"A Claim to Flame!" (Silver League Begins! Shigeru Returns!); Transliteration: "Shirogane Rīgu Kaimaku! Shigeru Futatabi!" (Japanese: シロガネリーグかいまく! シゲルふたたび!)	September 19, 2002	September 17, 2003
The Johto League Silver Conference begins as Ash meets up with his long-time rival, Gary. Who's That Pokémon?: Scizor
269	266	58	"Love, Pokémon Style" (League Preliminaries! Battle of the Magmarashi Flame!!); Transliteration: "Yosen Rīgu! Magumarashi Honō no Batoru!!" (Japanese: よせんリーグ! マグマラシほのおのバトル!!)	September 26, 2002	September 18, 2003
Continuing the Silver Conference, Ash fights Macey, a Trainer with a few tricks up her sleeve. After a 3-on-3 battle, in the end Ash wins over Macey, and moves on to Round 2! Who's That Pokémon?: Skiploom
270	267	59	"Tie One On!" (Meganium vs. Fushigidane! Spirit of the Grass Types!); Transliteration: "Meganiumu Tai Fushigidane! Kusa Taipu no Iji!" (Japanese: メガニウムVSフシギダネ! くさタイプのいじ!)	October 3, 2002	September 19, 2003
Continuing the Silver Conference, Ash faces off against Jackson, whose battle ends up in a draw. Ash ends up receiving more points and so heads onto the Championship Round, where he finds out he is facing his long-time rival; Gary Oak! Who's That Pokémon?: Azumarill
271	268	60	"The Ties That Bind" (League Finals! Full Battle 6 vs. 6!!); Transliteration: "Kesshō Rīgu! Furu Batoru Roku Tai Roku!!" (Japanese: けっしょうリーグ! フルバトル6VS6!!)	October 10, 2002	September 20, 2003
Ash's skills as Pokémon Trainer are put to the ultimate test as he finds himself going up against his long-time rival Gary. He stays up all night researching strategies and trying to learn more about Gary's Pokémon. Gary has a lot of strong Pokémon and he trains many different types, so Ash has to pick his team carefully. Who's That Pokémon?: Umbreon
272	269	61	"Can't Beat the Heat!" (Rival Confrontation! Kamex vs. Lizardon!!); Transliteration: "Raibaru Taiketsu! Kamekkusu Tai Rizādon!!" (Japanese: ライバルたいけつ! カメックスVSリザードン!!)	October 17, 2002	September 27, 2003
The Full Battle between Ash and Gary ends in a huge victory for Ash. He then discovers his next battle is against his new-met rival; Harrison! Who's That Pokémon?: Bayleef
273	270	62	"Playing with Fire!" (Bursyamo Returns! Battle Against Hazuki!!); Transliteration: "Bashāmo Futatabi! Hazuki to no Tatakai!!" (Japanese: バシャーモふたたび! ハヅキとのたたかい!!)	October 24, 2002	October 4, 2003
After his biggest victory over Gary, Ash faces against Harrison in the Silver Conference Quarterfinals. It's an exciting and thrilling battle that ends up with the pitting of their strongest Pokémon - Blaziken for Harrison and Charizard for Ash. Who's That Pokémon?: Ariados
274	271	63	"Johto Photo Finish" (To the End of the Destiny Battle! Respective Way!!); Transliteration: "Furu Batoru no Hate ni! Sorezore no Michi!!" (Japanese: フルバトルのはてに! それぞれのみち!!)	October 31, 2002	October 11, 2003
The Silver Conference Quarterfinals battle between Ash and Harrison ends in Harrison's victory. After losing in the Silver Conference Semifinals, he tells Ash all about Hoenn region and the amazing new Pokémon there. As the Johto League Silver Conference comes to a end and the gang prepares to leave for Vermillion City, Gary makes a surprising announcement—he's giving up battling and will instead become a Pokémon Researcher like his grandfather Professor Oak. Who's That Pokémon?: Tyranitar
275	272	64	"Gotta Catch Ya Later!" (Goodbye... And Then, Setting Off!); Transliteration: "Sayonara... Soshite, Tabidachi!" (Japanese: サヨナラ…そして、たびだち!)	November 7, 2002	October 18, 2003
After receiving messages to return home, Brock and Misty separate with Ash. On hearing Harrison's suggestion, Ash tearfully decides to head to the Hoenn region. Who's That Pokémon?: Hoppip
276	273	65	"Hoenn Alone!" (Parting with Pikachu...!); Transliteration: "Pikachū to no Wakare...!" (Japanese: ピカチュウとのわかれ!)	November 14, 2002	October 25, 2003
Ash sets off for his journey to the Hoenn region, but a failed Team Rocket scheme to capture Pikachu ends up causing the Electric-type Pokemon to fall gravely ill. Who's That Pokémon?: Forretress

== Music ==
The Japanese opening songs are "Aim to be a Pokémon Master" (めざせポケモンマスター 2001, Mezase Pokémon Masutā 2001) by Whiteberry for 29 episodes, and "Ready Go!" by Naomi Tamura for 36 episodes. The ending songs are "Face Forward Team Rocket!" (前向きロケット団!, Maemuki Roketto-dan!) by Team Rocket trio for 29 episodes, and "Pocket-ering Monster-ing" (ポケッターリ・モンスターリ, Pokettāri Monsutāri) by Kana for 36 episodes. The English opening song is "Believe in Me" by David Rolfe. A shortened version of the English opening song was used for the end credits.

== Home media releases ==
In the United States, two three-disc DVD sets were released by Viz Video and Ventura Distribution, which each contained 32 episodes each (10/11 episodes per DVD). These DVDs are now out of print.

Viz Media and Warner Home Video released Pokémon: Master Quest – The Complete Collection on DVD in the United States on October 11, 2016.
