= EBC Yoyo =

ETTV YoYo TV 東森幼幼台
- Type: Multichannel television
- Country: Taiwan
- Broadcast area: Taiwan
- Headquarters: Taipei, Taiwan

Programming
- Language: Chinese
- Picture format: 576i 4:3; 1080p 16:9

Ownership
- Owner: Eastern Broadcasting Company
- Sister channels: ETTV Super TV; ETTV Variety TV; ETTV YoYo TV; ETTV News TV; ETTV Drama TV; ETTV Movie TV; ETTV Foreign Movie TV

History
- Launched: January 1, 1998
- Former names: ETTV Cartoon

Links
- Website: https://yoyotv.ebc.net.tw/

EBC YoYo TV, formerly known as ETTV Cartoon (though its English name remains "YoYo TV"), is a cable television channel under ETTV in Taiwan. Its logo combines the letters "Y" and "O" (a spiral shape), resembling a snail, hence its nickname "Snail Channel." Launched in January 1998, the network primarily airs cartoons, anime, and variety shows made for kids. It is part of the Eastern Broadcasting Company.

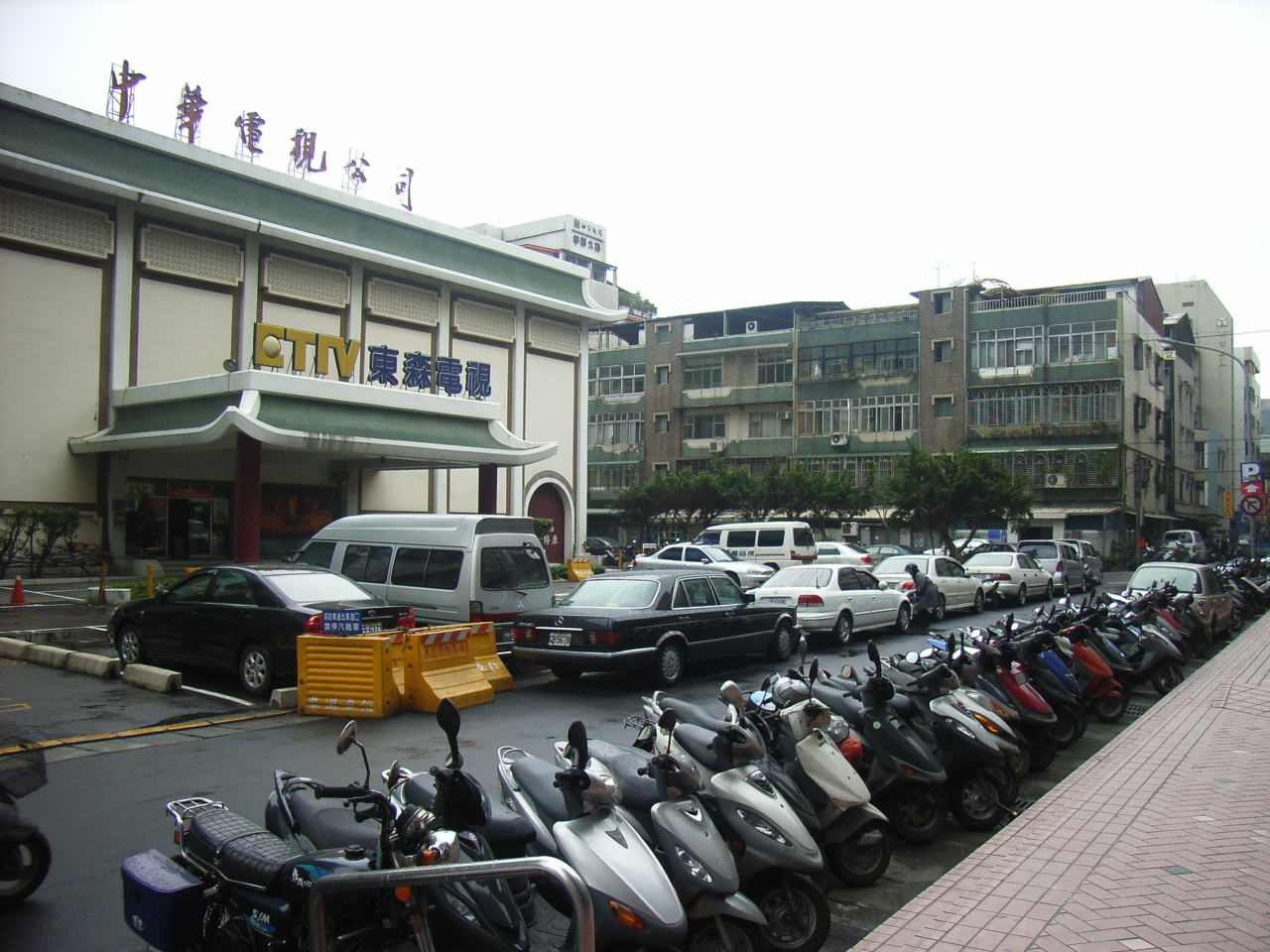
Eastern Television rented the studio building of China Television Company, and the Eastern Television logo was erected on the front of the building in Zhongzheng District, Taipei City, Taiwan

== International television channel ==
=== Taiwan ===
- YoYo TV - (Eastern Television).
- ETTV - (Eastern Television digital channel).

=== Vietnam ===
- CTV - (Ca Mau Radio and Television Station).
- HGTV - (Hau Giang Radio and Television Station).
- STV1, STV2 - (Soc Trang Radio and Television Station).
- KG, KG1 - (Kien Giang Radio and Television Station).
- THTPCT - (Can Tho City Radio and Television Station).
- BPTV1 - (Binh Phuoc Radio and Television Station).
- THTG - (Tien Giang Radio and Television Station).

== Production partner ==
- TMS Entertainment.
- Toei Animation.
- Madhouse, Inc..
- Nippon Animation.
- Nihon Ad Systems.
- Shin-Ei Animation.
- Studio Pierrot.
- Actas.

== Actor ==
=== ETTV Television Station ===
- Chao Tzu Chiang. (Zhao Ziqiang).
- Brother Black Skin. (Zhang Shanwei).
- Brother Xiang Xiang. (Zou Mingyang).

== Host program ==
=== YoYo Family ===
- Brother Black Skin. (Zhang Shanwei).
- Brother Xiang Xiang. (Zou Mingyang).

=== Fruit Family ===
(Formed in April 2000)

- Brother Banana. (Lin Lunyuan).
- Sister Apple. (Peng Weilin).
- Brother Watermelon. (Li Yue).
- Sister Peach. (Zhu Anyu).

=== Insect Family ===
(Formed in April 2002)

- Sister Bee. (Ke Mengxin). Born: April 2, 1983
- Brother Dragonfly. (Song Guozhang). Born: December 26, 1979
- Sister Butterfly. (Jian Zhuling). Born: September 22, 1983

=== Fruit New Force ===
(Formed in August 2005)

- Brother Orange. (Gan Tingfeng). Born: December 9, 1984
- Sister Strawberry. (Jian Jiaozhu). Born: January 29, 1986
- Brother Pineapple. (Jian Yilong). Born: February 15, 1983
- Sister Grape. (Zhao Shuting). Born: April 19, 1986

=== Sky Family ===
(Formed in March 2009)

- Brother Sun. (Pan Jinshu). Born: October 29, 198x
- Sister Rainbow. (Cai Mengying). Born: August 18, 198x
- Brother Star. (Song Mengfan). Born: February 18, 198x
- Sister Moon. (Shen Peiyi). Born: June 19, 198x

== Children program ==
=== Education - Synthetic - Technique - Intelligence ===
- ABC DoReMi.
- ABC Playhouse.
- ABC Wonderland.
- Ball Will Play with You.
- Bang Bang Game.
- BiBi Wonderland.
- Bighead Little Champion.
- Black Banana Fun Easy.
- Cool Little Helper.
- Crazy English.
- Creative Craft House.
- Daddy and Mommy, Take it Easy.
- Early Childhood Education Hope Forum.
- Fairy Tale Box.
- Family Call Call Fun.
- Go Battle King.
- Grandma Magic Mirror.
- Happy Magic House.
- Health Instant Messenger.
- Hello Kitty Park.
- Hi Kids Little Players.
- I Want To Go Out and Play.
- Leisurely Elementary School Cognitive Classroom.
- Little Geography.
- Mimi Cat Parent-Child Club.
- Mofa Art Go.
- Mommy and Baby.
- Monty Playhouse.
- Museum Adventure.
- Music Popcorn.
- Ocarina Toys.
- Parent-Child Call Call Fun.
- Parent-Child Club.
- Selected World Picture Book Awards.
- Spin the Earth.
- Star Travel Special Bus No.369.
- Taekwondo Little Hero.
- The Jungle Prince.
- Tuya Forest.
- YoYo ABC.
- YoYo Academy.
- YoYo Afternoon Roll Call.
- YoYo Diy Academy.
- YoYo Evening Roll Call.
- YoYo Fun Easy.
- YoYo Fun Time.
- YoYo Little Champion.
- YoYo Morning Roll Call.
- YoYo New Paradise.
- YoYo Roll Call.
- YoYo Science Park.

== Cartoon program ==
=== Adventure - Fun - Friends - Funny ===
==== Australia ====
- The Koala Brothers.

==== Canada ====
- Finley the Fire Engine.
- Franklin.
- Franny's Feet.
- Pandalian.
- Pecola.
- Rainbow Fish.
- SamSam.

==== China ====
- Blue Cat.

==== France ====
- 64 Zoo Lane.
- Backkom.
- Cooking? Child's Play!.
- SamSam.
- The Boy Who Wanted to Be a Bear.

==== Germany ====
- Grimms' Fairy Tales.
- Rainbow Fish.

==== Italy ====
- Calimero.

==== Japan ====
- Astro Boy.
- Atashin'chi.
- Bakusō Kyōdai Let's & Go!!.
- Chibi Maruko-chan.
- Chinpui.
- Dark Dash.
- Detective Conan.
- Doctor Slump.
- Dragon Ball.
- Dragon Ball Z.
- Futari wa Pretty Cure Max Heart.
- Futari wa Pretty Cure Splash Star.
- Fresh Pretty Cure!.
- Guru Guru Town Hanamaru-Kun.
- Hamtaro.
- HeartCatch PreCure!.
- Hello Kitty's Furry Tale Theater.
- Hello Kitty Paradise.
- Kimba the White Lion.
- Kiteretsu Daihyakka.
- Kyorochan.
- Mahōjin Guru Guru.
- Naruto.
- Naruto: Shippuden.
- Mermaid Melody Pichi Pichi Pitch.
- Nontan.
- Mushiking: The King of Beetles.
- Ocha-Ken.
- Ojamajo Doremi.
- Ojarumaru.
- One Piece.
- Origami Warriors.
- Ox Tales.
- Panyo Panyo Di Gi Charat.
- Perman.
- Pikachu.
- Pokémon.
- Pokémon: Advanced.
- Pokémon: Advanced Battle.
- Pokémon: Advanced Challenge.
- Pokémon Advanced Generation.
- Pokémon: Adventures on the Orange Islands.
- Pokémon: Battle Frontier.
- Pokémon Chronicles.
- Pokémon: Diamond and Pearl.
- Pokémon: Diamond and Pearl: Battle Dimension.
- Pokémon: Diamond and Pearl: Galactic Battles.
- Pokémon: Diamond and Pearl: Sinnoh League Victors.
- Pokémon: Indigo League.
- Pokémon: Johto League Champions.
- Pokémon: Master Quest.
- Pokémon: The Johto Journeys.
- Pokémon: The Mastermind of Mirage Pokémon.
- PopoloCrois.
- Pretty Cure.
- Sonic X.
- Tales of Little Women.
- Tank Knights Portriss.
- The Adventures of Tom Sawyer.
- The Transformers.
- Tokyo Pig.
- Twin Princess of Wonder Planet.
- UFO Baby.
- Vicky the Viking.
- Yes! PreCure 5.
- Yume no Crayon Oukoku.
- Zoids: Fuzors.

==== Netherlands ====
- Miffy.

==== South Korea ====
- Dibo the Gift Dragon.
- Hey Yo Yorang.
- Jang Geum's Dream.
- Mix Master.
- Mumu Hug.
- Olympus Guardian.
- Origami Warriors.
- Pororo the Little Penguin.
- Tank Knights Portriss.

==== Taiwan ====
- Journey to the West.
- Mumu Hug.
- Origami Warriors.
- Sami Yam.
- YoYo Man.
- YoYo Man-X.

==== United Kingdom ====
- Finley the Fire Engine.
- In the Night Garden....
- Little Robots.
- Lucy Cousins.
- Make Way for Noddy.
- Noddy.
- Pingu.
- The Secret Show.
- Thomas & Friends.

==== United States ====
- 64 Zoo Lane.
- Avatar the Last Airbender.
- Barbie.
- Blue's Clues.
- Blue's Room.
- Bob the Builder.
- ChalkZone.
- Curious George.
- Dora the Explorer.
- Finley the Fire Engine.
- Go, Diego, Go!.
- Little Bill.
- My Little Pony.
- Ni Hao, Kai-Lan.
- Rainbow Fish.
- SpongeBob SquarePants
- Teenage Mutant Ninja Turtles.
- The Adventures of Jimmy Neutron, Boy Genius.
- The Backyardigans.
- The Fairly OddParents.
- The Triplets.
- The Wild Thornberrys.
- The Wizard of Oz.

== Children series ==
=== Action - Drama - Forces - Thunder ===
==== Japan ====
===== Kamen Rider =====
- Kamen Rider 555.
- Kamen Rider Agito.
- Kamen Rider Blade.
- Kamen Rider Den-O.
- Kamen Rider Hibiki.
- Kamen Rider Kabuto.
- Kamen Rider Kiva
- Kamen Rider Kuuga.
- Kamen Rider Ryuki.

===== Super Sentai =====
- Bakuryū Sentai Abaranger.
- Engine Sentai Go-onger.
- GoGo Sentai Boukenger.
- Hyakujuu Sentai Gaoranger.
- Juken Sentai Gekiranger.
- Mahou Sentai Magiranger.
- Mirai Sentai Timeranger.
- Ninpuu Sentai Hurricaneger.
- Tokusou Sentai Dekaranger.

==== United Kingdom ====
- Teletubbies.

== Broadcast duration ==
- January 1998 - December 31, 1999: 6:00 - 23:00 daily
- January 1, 2000 - June 30, 2003: 5:00 - 23:00 daily
- July 1, 2003 - December 31, 2008: 5:00 - 4:00 daily
- since January 1, 2009: 0:00 - 23:00 daily
