= List of Pokémon theme songs =

This is a list of Pokémon theme songs, original Japanese and English dubbed opening and ending themes of Pokémon anime.

== Japanese theme songs ==
=== Opening themes ===
#	Japanese title	Rōmaji	English translation	Vocalist	Episodes used
1	めざせポケモンマスター	Mezase Pokémon Masutā	Aim to Be a Pokémon Master	Rica Matsumoto	01–82
1	めざせポケモンマスター 2001	Mezase Pokémon Masutā 2001	Aim to Be a Pokémon Master 2001	Whiteberry	194–240
1	めざせポケモンマスター 2017 (20th Anniversary)	Mezase Pokémon Masutā 2017 (20th Anniversary)	Aim to Be a Pokémon Master 2017 (20th Anniversary)	Rica Matsumoto	971–984
1	めざせポケモンマスター -with my friends-	Mezase Pokémon Masutā -with my friends-	Aim to be a Pokémon Master - with my friends-	Rica Matsumoto	1224–1234
2	ライバル!	Raibaru!	The Rivals!	Rica Matsumoto	083–118
3	OK(オーケー)！	OK! (Ōkē!)	OK!	Rica Matsumoto	119–193
4	Ready Go(レディー ゴー)！	Ready Go! (Redī Gō!)	Ready Go!	Naomi Tamura	241–276
5	アドバンス・アドベンチャー	Adobansu Adobenchā	Advance Adventure	GARDEN	277–345
6	チャレンジャー!!	Charenjā!!	Challenger!!	Rica Matsumoto	346–380
7	ポケモン シンフォニック メドレー	Pokémon Shinfonikku Medorē	Pokémon Symphonic Medley	Pokémon Symphonic Orchestra	381–410
8	バトルフロンティア	Batoru Furontia	Battle Frontier	Akina Takaya	411–441
9	スパート!	Supāto!	Spurt!	Rica Matsumoto	442–468
10	Together (トゥゲザー)	Together (Tugezā)	Together	Fumie Akiyoshi	470–546 (DVD); 472–546
10	Together 2008 (トゥゲザー 2008)	Together 2008 (Tugezā 2008)	Together 2008	Fumie Akiyoshi	547–563
11	ハイタッチ!	Hai Tatchi!	High Touch!	Rica Matsumoto and Megumi Toyoguchi	564–601
11	ハイタッチ! 2009	Hai Tatchi! 2009	High Touch! 2009	Rica Matsumoto and Megumi Toyoguchi	602– 626
12	サイコー・エブリデイ!	Saikō – Eburidei!	The Greatest – Everyday!	Fumie Akiyoshi	627–650
12	サイコー・エブリデイ! (BAND VERSION)	Saikō – Eburidei! (BAND VERSION)	The Greatest – Everyday! (Band Version)	Fumie Akiyoshi with The Greatest-Band	651–659
13	ベストウイッシュ！	Besuto Uisshu!	Best Wishes!	Rica Matsumoto	660–743
14	やじるしになって！	Yajirushi ni Natte!	Be an Arrow!	Rica Matsumoto	744–767
14	やじるしになって！2013	Yajirushi ni Natte! 2013	Be an Arrow! 2013	Rica Matsumoto	768–781
15	夏めく坂道	Natsumeku Sakamichi	Summerly Slope	Daisuke	782–801
16	V（ボルト）	V (Boruto)	V (Volt)	Yūsuke Kamiji; Rica Matsumoto and Jewel (J☆Dee'Z)	802–828
16	メガV （メガボルト）	Mega V (Mega Boruto)	Mega V (Mega Volt)	Yūsuke Kamiji	829–855
17	ゲッタバンバン	Getta Banban	Mad-Paced Getter	Tomohisa Sako; Rica Matsumoto and Ikue Ōtani	856–894
18	XY&Z（エックスワイ&ゼット）	XY&Z (Ekkusu Wai & Zetto)	XY&Z	Rica Matsumoto	895–941
19	アローラ!!	Arōra!!	Alola!!	Rica Matsumoto and Ikue Ōtani	942–970; 985–1001
20	未来コネクション	Mirai Konekushon	Future Connection	ЯeaL	1002–1031
21	キミの冒険	Kimi no Bōken	Your Adventure	Taiiku Okazaki	1032–1087
22	1(ワン)・2(ツー)・3(スリー) (version 1)	Wan, Tsū, Surī (version 1)	One, Two, Three (version 1)	After The Rain (Soraru & Mafumafu)	1088–1118
22	1(ワン)・2(ツー)・3(スリー) (version 2)	Wan, Tsū, Surī (version 2)	One, Two, Three (version 2)	Golden Bomber (Nishikawa-kun and Kirisho	1119–1136
22	1(ワン)・2(ツー)・3(スリー) (version 3)	Wan, Tsū, Surī (version 3)	One, Two, Three (version 3)	Karrage Shimai (Erika Ikuta and Sayuri Matsumura from Nogizaka46)	1137–1186
22	1(ワン)・2(ツー)・3(スリー) (version 4)	Wan, Tsū, Surī (version 4)	One, Two, Three (version 4)	Rica Matsumoto and Daiki Yamashita	1187–1223
23	ドキメキダイアリー	Dokimeki Daiarī	Heart-Pounding Diary	asmi feat. Chinozo	1237–1259
24	ハロ	Haro	Hello	Yama and BotchiBoromaru	1260–1279
25	Will(ウイル)	Will	Will	Ive	1280–1301
26	Only One Story	Only One Story	Only One Story	ZEROBASEONE	1302–1323
27	GET BACK	Getto bakku	GET BACK	Yuzu	1325–1345
28	アイオライト	Aioraito	Iolite	Eve	1349–1370
29	セカイツナガレ	Sekai Tsunagare	Connecting the World	HoneyWorks	1371–present

=== Ending themes ===
#	Japanese title	Rōmaji	English translation	Vocalist	Episodes used
1	ひゃくごじゅういち	Hyakugojūichi	One Hundred Fifty-One	Unshō Ishizuka and Pokémon Kids	01–27, 1224–1225, 1227–1229, 1231, 1233
2	ニャースのうた	Nyāsu no Uta	Meowth's Song	Inuko Inuyama	28–37, 67–70
3	ポケットにファンタジー	Poketto ni Fantajī	Fantasy in My Pocket	Sachiko Kobayashi and Juri Ihata	38–53, 65–66
4	ポケモン音頭	Pokémon Ondo	Pokémon March	Sachiko Kobayashi, Unshō Ishizuka, Kōichi Sakaguchi and Shimai Niitsu	54–64, 106
5	タイプ: ワイルド	Taipu: Wairudo	Type: Wild	Rica Matsumoto	71–105, 1234
6	ラプラスにのって	Rapurasu ni Notte	Riding on Lapras	Mayumi Iizuka and Rikako Aikawa	107–118, 1230
7	ニャースのパーティ	Nyāsu no Pāti	Meowth's Party	Inuko Inuyama, Megumi Hayashibara and Shin-ichiro Miki	119–143
8	ポケモンはらはらリレー	Pokémon Hara Hara Rirē	Exciting Pokémon Relay	Rikako Aikawa and Chorus	144–153, 165–174
8	ポケモンはらはら^{2}リレー (むずかし版)	Pokémon Hara Hara^{2} Rirē (Muzukashi Ban)	Exciting^{2} Pokémon Relay (Hard version)	Rikako Aikawa and Chorus	154–158
9	タケシのパラダイス	Takeshi no Paradaisu	Takeshi's Paradise	Yūji Ueda	159–164, 1226
10	ぼくのベストフレンドへ	Boku no Besuto Furendo e	To My Best Friend	Hiromi Iwasaki	175–193
11	前向きロケット団!	Maemuki Roketto-dan!	Face Forward Team Rocket!	Inuko Inuyama Megumi Hayashibara, Shin-ichiro Miki and Yūji Ueda	194–240, 1232
12	ポケッターリ モンスターリ	Pokettāri Monsutāri	Pocket-ering Monster-ing	Emi Ōta (KANA)	241–276
13	そこに空があるから	Soko ni Sora ga Aru Kara	Because the Sky is There	Toshiko Ezaki	277–294, 321–327
14	ポルカ・オ・ドルカ	Poruka O Doruka	Polka O Dolka	Inuko Inuyama and Norusoru Gasshōdan	295–320
15	スマイル	Sumairu	Smile	Toshiko Ezaki	328–358, 368–374
16	いっぱいサマー!!	Ippai Samā!	Full of Summer!!	Naomi Tamura and the Himawari Choir	359–367
17	GLORY DAY （グローリー デイ）～輝くその日～	GLORY DAY (Gurōrī Dei) ~Kagayaku Sono Hi~	GLORY DAY ~That Shining Day~	GARDEN	375–410, 426–448
18	ポケモンかぞえうた	Pokémon Kazoe Uta	Pokémon Counting Song	Akiko Kanazawa and Shimai Niitsu	411–425
19	私、負けない! ～ハルカのテーマ～	Watashi, Makenai! ~Haruka no Tēma~	I, Won't Lose! ~Haruka's Theme~	Kaori Suzuki	449–468
20	君のそばで～ヒカリのテーマ～	Kimi no Soba de ~Hikari no Tēma~	By Your Side ~Hikari's Theme~	Grin	469–491
20	君のそばで～ヒカリのテーマ～(Pop-Up Version)	Kimi no Soba de ~Hikari no Tēma~ (Pop-Up Version)	By Your Side ~Hikari's Theme~ (Pop-Up Version)	Grin	492–518
20	君のそばで～ヒカリのテーマ～(Winter Version)	Kimi no Soba de ~Hikari no Tēma~ (Winter Version)	By Your Side ~Hikari's Theme~ (Winter Version)	Grin	519–529
21	風のメッセージ	Kaze no Messēji	Message of the Wind	Mai Mizuhashi	530–540, 552–563
21	風のメッセージ (PokaPoka-VERSION.)	Kaze no Messēji (PokaPoka-VERSION.)	Message of the Wind (PokaPoka VERSION.)	Mai Mizuhashi	541–551
22	あしたはきっと	Ashita wa Kitto	Surely Tomorrow	Kanako Yoshii	564–588
23	もえよギザみみピチュー！	Moe yo Giza Mimi Pichū!	Get Fired Up, Spiky-eared Pichu!	Shoko Nakagawa	589–612
24	ドッチ～ニョ？	Dotchi~nyo?	Which One ~ Is It?	MooMoo Milk and Araki-san	613–650
25	君の胸にLaLaLa	Kimi no Mune ni LaLaLa	In Your Heart, LaLaLa	MADOKA	651–659
26	心のファンファーレ	Kokoro no Fanfāre	Fanfare of the Heart	Aki Okui	660–684
27	ポケモン言えるかな？BW（ビーダブリュー）	Pokémon Ierukana? BW (Bī Daburyū)	Can You Name All the Pokémon? BW (BW)	Takeshi Tsuruno	685–719
28	七色アーチ	Nanairo Āchi	Seven-colored Arch	Pokémon BW Choral Gang	720–737
29	みてみて☆こっちっち	Mite Mite ☆Kotchitchi	Look Look☆Here	Momoiro Clover Z	738–767
30	サクラ・ゴーラウンド	Sakura Gō Raundo	Sakura Go-Round	Shiritsu Ebisu Chūgaku	768–781
31	手をつなごう	Te o Tsunagō	Let's Join Hands	Shiritsu Ebisu Chūgaku	782–801
32	X海峡Y景色	X Kaikyō Y Keshiki	X Strait Y Scenery	Jewel (J☆Dee'Z)	802–828
33	ピースマイル!	Pīsumairu!	Peace Smile!	Jewel (J☆Dee'Z) and Ikue Ōtani	829–846
34	ドリドリ ドリドリ (セレナ ver.)	Doridori; Doridori (Serena Ver.)	DreamDream; DreamDream (Serena Ver.)	Shoko Nakagawa; Mayuki Makiguchi	847–868, 914, 939
35	ガオガオ・オールスター	Gaogao Ōrusutā	Roaring All-Stars	Little Glee Monster	869–894
36	プニちゃんのうた	Puni-chan no Uta	Puni-chan's Song	Mariya Ise	895–907, 909–913, 915–924, 926–929, 933–935
37	ロケット団団歌	Roketto-dan danka	Team Rocket's Team Song	Megumi Hayashibara, Shin-ichiro Miki, Inuko Inuyama, Yūji Ueda	908
38	キラキラ (シトロンVer.)	Kirakira (Shitoron Ver.)	Brilliantly (Clemont ver.)	Yūki Kaji	925, 938
39	ピカチュウのうた	Pikachū no Uta	Pikachu's Song	Ikue Ōtani	930–932
40	ニャースのバラード	Nyāsu no Barādo	Meowth's Ballad	Inuko Inuyama	936–937, 940
41	ポーズ	Pōzu	Pose	Taiiku Okazaki	942–1001
42	ジャリボーイ・ジャリガール	Jari-bōi, Jari-gāru	Twerp, Twerpette	Taiiku Okazaki	1002–1044
43	心のノート	Kokoro no Nōto	Notebook of the Heart	Hino City Nanaomidori Elementary School Choir	1045–1069
44	タイプ: ワイルド 2019	Taipu: Wairudo 2019	Type: Wild 2019	Shoko Nakagawa	1070–1087
45	ポケモンしりとり（ピカチュウ→ミュウVer.）	Pokémon Shiritori (Pikachu → Mew Ver.)	Pokémon Shiritori (Pikachu → Mew Ver.)	Pokémon Music Club (Junichi Masuda/Pasocom Music Club/Pokémon Kids 2019)	1089–1157
45	ポケモンしりとり (ミュウ→ザマゼンタVer.）	Pokémon Shiritori (Mew → Zamazenta Ver.)	Pokémon Shiritori (Mew → Zamazenta Ver.)	Pokémon Music Club (Junichi Masuda/Pasocom Music Club/Pokémon Kids 2019)	1089–1157
46	バツグンタイプ	Batsugun Taipu	Supereffective Type	Pokémon Music Club (Junichi Masuda/Pasocom Music Club/Pokémon Kids 2019)	1158–1222
47	RVR〜ライジングボルテッカーズラップ〜	RVR~Raijingu Boritekkāzu Rappu~	RVR~Rising Voltacklers' Rap~	Minori Suzuki, Yuka Terasaki, Taku Yashiro, Ayane Sakura & Kenta Miyake	1237–1279
48		Let me battle	Let me battle	9Lana	1280–1301
49	ピッカーン！	Pikkaan!	Sparkle!	Giga, TeddyLoid, and Rina Matsuda & Hikaru Morita (Sakurazaka46)	1302–1322
50		Ready Go	Ready Go	Me:I	1326–1345
51	尤	YUU	YUU	Yuzu	1346–1348
52	ねてもさめても	Netemo Sametemo	Asleep or Awake	Polkadot Stingray	1349–1370
53	キュートなキューたい	Kyūto-na Kyū-tai	CUTIE SPHERE	CUTIE STREET	1371–present

=== Special themes ===
==== Pokémon Get☆TV ====
Japanese title	Rōmaji	English translation	Vocalist
ポケダンシング☆XY	Poké Danshingu☆XY	Poké Dancing☆XY	J☆Dee'Z

==== Weekly Pokémon Broadcasting Station ====
Japanese title	Rōmaji	English translation	Vocalist
ぼくのベストフレンドへ	Boku no Besuto Furendo e	To My Best Friend	Hiromi Iwasaki
タケシのパラダイス	Takeshi no Paradaisu	Takeshi's Paradise	Yūji Ueda
ラプラスにのって	Rapurasu ni Notte	Riding on Lapras	Mayumi Iizuka and Rikako Aikawa
前向きロケット団!	Maemuki Roketto-dan!	Look Forward Team Rocket!	Inuko Inuyama, Megumi Hayashibara, Shinichiro Miki, and Yuji Ueda
ひゃくごじゅういち	Hyakugojūichi	One Hundred Fifty-One	Unshō Ishizuka and Pokémon Kids
ポケッターリ モンスターリ	Pokettāri Monsutāri	Pocket-ering Monster-ing	KANA
ニャースのパーティ	Nyāsu no Pāti	Meowth's Party	Inuko Inuyama, Megumi Hayashibara, and Shinichiro Miki
ポケモン音頭	Pokémon Ondo	Pokémon March	Sachiko Kobayashi, Unshō Ishizuka, Kōichi Sakaguchi and Shimai Niitsu
ポケモンはらはらリレー	Pokémon Hara Hara Rirē	Exciting Pokémon Relay	Rikako Aikawa And Chorus
ポケットにファンタジー	Poketto ni Fantajī	Fantasy in My Pocket	Sachiko Kobayashi & Juri Ihata
ポケモンはらはら^{2}リレー (むずかし版)	Pokémon Hara Hara^{2} Rirē (Muzukashi Ban)	Exciting^{2} Pokémon Relay (Hard Version)	Rikako Aikawa and Chorus
ポルカ・オ・ドルカ	Poruka O Doruka	Polka O Dolka	Inuko Inuyama and Nolsol Chorus Group
ニャースのうた	Nyāsu no Uta	Meowth's Song	Inuko Inuyama
ポケフリーゲームのうた	Poké-Furī Gēmu no Uta	The Poké-Pose Game Song	Tokiwa Forest Chrous
タイプ: ワイルド	Taipu: Wairudo	Type: Wild	Rica Matsumoto
マーチングマーチ	Māchingu Māchi	Marching March	Halcali

==== Pocket Monsters Best Wishes! ====
Japanese title	Rōmaji	English translation	Vocalist
ロケット団よ永遠に	Roketto-dan yo Eien ni	Team Rocket Forever	Inuko Inuyama, Megumi Hayashibara and Shin-ichiro Miki

==== Pocket Monsters Sun & Moon ====
Japanese title	Rōmaji	English translation	Vocalist
ブレス	Buresu	Breath	Porno Graffitti

==== Pocket Monsters (2019) ====
Japanese title	Rōmaji	English translation	Vocalist
ふしぎなふしぎな生きもの	Fushigina Fushigina Ikimono	Strange and Wonderful Creatures	Tortoise Matsumoto (Ulfuls)

==== Pocket Monsters Legends: Arceus anime ====
Japanese title	Rōmaji	English translation	Musical score
ポケットモンスターBGM	Poketto Monsutā BGM	Pocket Monsters BGM	Shinji Miyazaki

==== Pokémon☆Sunday ====
Japanese title	Rōmaji	English translation	Vocalist
前向きロケット団!	Maemuki Roketto-dan!	Look Forward Team Rocket!	Inuko Inuyama, Megumi Hayashibara, Shin-ichiro Miki and Yūji Ueda
ハロー!サンキュー!	Harō! Sankyū!	Hello! Thank You!	BECKY and Poképark Kids Chorus
バトルフロンティア	Batoru Furontia	Battle Frontier	Akina Takaya
Y E A H!	Y E A H!	Y E A H!	Hinoi Team
スパート!	Supāto!	Spurt!	Rica Matsumoto
ビック・ニャース・デイ	Biggu Nyāsu Dei	Big Meowth Day	Inuko Inuyama
ポケモンなりきりサンデー	Pokémon Narikiri Sandē	Pokémon Role-Playing Sunday	Shōko Nakagawa

==== Pokémon Smash! ====
Japanese title	Rōmaji	English translation	Vocalist
Endless Fighters	Endless Fighters	Endless Fighters	AAA
ポケモン言えるかな？BW（ビーダブリュー）	Pokémon Ierukana? BW (Bī Daryū)	Can You Name All the Pokémon? BW	Takeshi Tsuruno
ポケモン言えるかな？BW（ビーダブリュー）高速Ver.	Pokémon Ierukana? BW (Bī Daryū) Kōsoku Ver.	Can You Name All the Pokémon? BW High-Speed Ver.	Takeshi Tsuruno
アイ アム アー ヒーロー	Ai Amu ā Hīrō	I Am a Hero	Stereopony

==== Meet Up at the Pokémon House? ====
Japanese title	Rōmaji	English translation	Vocalist
ポケだちの歌	Pokédachi no Uta	Poké-Friends' Song	Shoko Nakagawa, Hyadain, Abareru-kun and Rinka Otani

== English theme songs ==
External videos
- Pokémon the Series Openings – An official playlist compiling the first eleven Pokémon opening theme songs

=== Opening themes ===
#	English title	Vocalist	Season used
1	Pokémon Theme	Jason Paige	Season 1
1	Pokémon Theme (XY version)	Ben Dixon and The Sad Truth	Season 17
2	Pokémon World	Russell Velázquez	Season 2
3	Pokémon Johto	Johto (musical group)	Season 3
4	Born to Be a Winner	David Rolfe	Season 4
5	Believe in Me	David Rolfe	Season 5
6	I Want to Be a Hero	David Rolfe	Season 6
7	This Dream	David Rolfe	Season 7
8	Unbeatable	David Rolfe	Season 8
9	Battle Frontier	Jason Appleton	Season 9
10	Diamond and Pearl	Chris "Breeze" Barczynski	Season 10
11	We Will Be Heroes	Kirsten Price	Season 11
12	Battle Cry – (Stand Up!)	Erin Bowman	Season 12
13	We Will Carry On!	Adam Elk	Season 13
14	Black and White	Erin Bowman and Joe Philips	Season 14
15	Rival Destinies	Alex Nackman and Kathryn Raio	Season 15
16	It's Always You and Me	Neal Coomer and Kathryn Raio	Season 16
17	Be a Hero	Ben Dixon and The Sad Truth	Season 18
18	Stand Tall	Ben Dixon and The Sad Truth	Season 19
19	Under the Alolan Sun	Jannel Candrice and The Sad Truth, Ben Dixon and The Vestigial Horns	Season 20
20	Under the Alolan Moon	Haven Paschall, Ben Dixon, Charity Goodin and James Mosely	Season 21
21	The Challenge of Life	Dani Marcus and The Sad Truth, James Mosely, Charity Goodin and Ben Dixon	Season 22
22	The Journey Starts Today	Walk Off the Earth	Season 23
23	Journey to Your Heart	Haven Paschall	Season 24
24	With You	Echosmith	Season 25
25	Gotta Catch em All	Ben Dixon and the Sad Truth, Haven Paschall, Hillary Thomas	Season 25
26	Becoming Me	Haven Paschall	Season 26
27	We Go	aespa	Season 26
28	My Favorite Pokémon	Isaiah Tyrell Boyd, Haven Paschall	Season 27
29	Will -Korean ver.	IVE	Season 27
30	Evolving Again	Haven Paschall	Season 28
31	GET BACK	Yuzu	Season 28

=== Ending themes ===
#	Title	Vocalist
1	Kanto Pokérap	James "D. Train" Williams, Babi Floyd, John Loeffler, Louis Cortelezzi and Ken Cummings
2	My Best Friends	Ray Greene, Darcell Wilson and Michael Whalen
3	Double Trouble	Rachael Lillis, Eric Stuart and Maddie Blaustein
4	What Kind of Pokémon Are You?	Joshua Tyler, Russell Velázquez, Sharon Bryant, Kati Mac and John Loeffler
5	Together Forever	J.P. Hartmann, Russell Velázquez, Sharon Byrant, Elaine Casewell and Ken Cummings
6	2.B.A. Master	Russell Velázquez, Erika Velázquez, Jake Velázquez and Sara Velázquez
7	Viridian City	Jason Paige, Andre Betts, Elaine Caswell, Vivian Cherry, Frank Lloyd and Neil Jason
8	You & Me & Pokémon	Élan Rivera and Johto (Musical group)
9	Pikachu (I Choose You)	Élan Rivera and Johto (Musical group)
10	Song of Jigglypuff	Rachael Lillis and Johto (Musical group)
11	All We Wanna Do	Élan Rivera and Johto (Musical group)
12	Two Perfect Girls	Eric Stuart
13	Go Pokémon Go! (Rap)	Sam Milby ft. Juan Antonio De la Paz

Note: "Pokémon Theme" was used as the end credit theme song in the dub, starting from "Pokémon: Indigo League" Episode 1: Pokémon - I Choose You! to Episode 57: The Breeder Center Secret, shortened theme songs were used as the end credit theme songs in the dub, from "Pokémon: Indigo League" Episode 52: Princess vs. Princess to "Pokémon: Advanced Battle" Episode 145: Pasta la Vista, shortened instrumentals of the theme songs were used as the end credit theme songs in the dub, starting from "Pokémon: Diamond & Pearl" Episode 1: Following the Maiden's Voyage.

=== Special themes ===
==== Pocket Monsters Encore ====
English title	Vocalist
Type: Wild (English Version)	Robbie Danzie

=== Other songs ===
#	Title	Artist	Notes
1	Gotta Catch 'Em All	50.Grind	The song hit #57 on the UK Singles Chart

== Anime soundtracks ==
The Pokémon anime has many soundtracks.

=== Pocket Monsters Sound Anime Collection: Music Collection/Famous Scene Collection ===
Pocket Monsters Sound Anime Collection: Music Collection/Famous Scene Collection

Soundtrack album by Shinji Miyazaki
- Released: June 10, 1998; 28 years ago
- Genre: J-pop
- Language: Japanese
- Label: Pikachu Records

Pocket Monsters Sound Anime Collection: Music Collection/Famous Scene Collection (ポケットモンスター サウンドアニメコレクション — 音楽集・名場面集, Poketto Monsutā Saundo Anime Korekushion Ongaku Shū Meibamen Shū) is the licensed soundtrack from the anime. It was released by Pikachu Records on June 10, 1998, in Japan only. This collection consists of composer Shinji Miyazaki's orchestrated arrangements of musical compositions from the first four Pokémon games by composer Junichi Masuda and exclusive musical cues heard throughout the first series. These instrumental tracks are categorized as sixteen chapters included with the show's first opening theme song "Mezase Pokémon Masutā" and third ending theme song "Poketto ni Fantajī" (both are the TV-size edits). Each of the instrumental tracks are followed by a brief commentary featuring Satoshi's Pokémon Zukan voiced by its voice actor Shin-ichiro Miki explaining each composition's association with the story and at what point it plays. Included with the album is a hard bound picture book (the Meibamen Shū (名場面集, famous (impressive) scene collection)), stickers, and a merchandise catalogue.

==== Track list ====
No.	Title	Lyrics	Music	Performed by	Length
1.	"Mezase Pokémon Masutā" (めざせポケモンマスター Aim to Be a Pokémon Master)	Akihito Toda	Hirokazu Tanaka	Rica Matsumoto	2:43

Chapter.1 Pokémon! I Choose You! (ポケモン!君に決めた!, Pokémon! Kimi ni Kimeta!)
No.	Title	Music	Length
2.	"Pokémon! Kimi ni Kimeta!" (ポケモン!君に決めた！ Pokémon! I Choose You!)	Junichi Masuda	2:13

Chapter.2 The Adventure Begins! (冒険が始まる!, Bōken ga Hajimaru!)
No.	Title	Music	Length
3.	"Tabidachi" (旅立ち Setting Off)	Junichi Masuda	1:16
4.	"Jitensha de Gō!" (自転車でゴー！ Go by Bicycle!)	Junichi Masuda	1:34
5.	"Santo Annu Gō" (サントアンヌ号 The Saint Anne)	Junichi Masuda	1:12

Chapter.3 Friends (仲間たち, Nakamatachi)
No.	Title	Music	Length
6.	"Pikachū Tōjō" (ピカチュウ登場ち Pikachu Appears)	Shinji Miyazaki	1:31
7.	"Maboroshi no Pokémon" (幻のポケモン The Phantom Pokémon)	Shinji Miyazaki	1:32
8.	"Pokémon! Getto da ze!" (ポケモン!ゲットだぜ！ Get Pokémon!)	Shinji Miyazaki	1:33

Chapter.4 I Love Pokémon! (ポケモン大好き!たち, Pokémon Daisuki! Tatchi)
No.	Title	Music	Length
9.	"Pokémon Horidē" (ポケモンホリデー Pokémon Holiday)	Junichi Masuda	1:23
10.	"Osorubeshi Kodakku" (おそるべしコダック Frightened Koduck)	Junichi Masuda	1:43
11.	"Pokémon Rīgu Kōnin Kyappu" (ポケモンリーグ公認キャップ Pokémon League Official Cap)	Shinji Miyazaki	1:30

Chapter.5 Puzzle and Mystery (謎と神秘, Nazo to Shinpi)
No.	Title	Music	Length
12.	"Masaki no Tōdai" (マサキの灯台 Masaki's Lighthouse)	Shinji Miyazaki	1:32
13.	"Densetsu" (伝説 Legend)	Shinji Miyazaki	1:57
14.	"Roketto-dan Bosu no Tēma" (ロケット団ボスのテーマ Theme of the Rocket Gang Boss)	Shinji Miyazaki	1:32

Chapter.6 Rocket Gang Visit (ロケット団参上!, Roketto-dan Sanjō)
No.	Title	Music	Length
15.	"Roketto-dan Onmitsu Sakusen" (ロケット団隠密作戦 Rocket Gang's Secret Strategy)	Shinji Miyazaki	1:56
16.	"Roketto-dan Shichihenge" (ロケット団七変化 Rocket Gang's Seven's Apparition)	Shinji Miyazaki	1:28
17.	"Nandakanda to Kikaretara..." (なんだかんだと聞かれたら... When Hearing about Something or Other...)	Shinji Miyazaki	1:33

Chapter.7 Danger Zone (危険地帯, Kiken Chitai)
No.	Title	Music	Length
18.	"Kyōteki Arawaru" (強敵現わる Strong Adversary Emerges)	Shinji Miyazaki	1:36
19.	"Shūgeki!" (襲撃！ Surprise Attack!)	Shinji Miyazaki	1:28

Chapter.8 Violent Fight without Limit (激闘果てしなく, Gekitō Hateshinaku)
No.	Title	Music	Length
20.	"Nigero ya Nigero!" (逃げろや逃げろ！ Escape, Escape!)	Shinji Miyazaki	1:30
21.	"Daikonsen" (大混戦 Big Confused Fight)	Shinji Miyazaki	1:36

Chapter.9 Challenge! Gym Leader Battle (挑戦!ジムリーダー戦, Chōsen! Jimu Rīdā Sen)
No.	Title	Music	Length
22.	"Pokémon Batoru" (ポケモンバトル Pokémon Battle)	Junichi Masuda	1:42
23.	"Shakunetsu no Batorufīrudo" (灼熱のバトルフィールド The Red-Hot Battlefield)	Junichi Masuda	2:14
24.	"Yatta ze!" (やったぜ！ I Did It!)	Junichi Masuda	2:08

Chapter.10 The Warrior's Rest (戦士の休息, Senshi no Kyūsoku)
No.	Title	Music	Length
25.	"Tsuki no Ishi" (月の石 Stone of the Moon)	Shinji Miyazaki	1:24
26.	"Inori" (祈り Prayer)	Shinji Miyazaki	1:18
27.	"Saikai" (再会 Meet Again)	Shinji Miyazaki	1:25

Chapter.11 Pokémon Way of Life (ポケモン人生模様, Pokémon Jinsei Moyō)
No.	Title	Music	Length
28.	"Oden" (おでん)	Shinji Miyazaki	1:15
29.	"Charinko Bōsōzoku" (チャリンコ暴走族 Bicycle Gang)	Shinji Miyazaki	1:22
30.	"Tōshi" (闘志 Fighting Spirit)	Shinji Miyazaki	1:44

Chapter.12 The Dazzling Beautiful Girl (眩惑の美女, Genwaku no Bijō)
No.	Title	Music	Length
31.	"Genwaku no Bijō" (眩惑の美女 The Dazzling Beautiful Girl)	Junichi Masuda	1:31

Chapter.13 Ordeal (試練, Shiren)
No.	Title	Music	Length
32.	"Shinobiyoru Kage" (しのびよる影 Spying from the Shadows)	Shinji Miyazaki	1:28
33.	"Zettai Zetsumei" (絶対絶命< Desperate Situation)	Shinji Miyazaki	1:41
34.	"Kyōaku Pokémon Shutsugen!" (凶悪ポケモン出現！ Terrible Pokémon Appearance!)	Shinji Miyazaki	1:25

Chapter.14 Rushing into the Pokémon League! (ポケモンリーグ突入！, Pokémon Rīgu Totsunyū!)
No.	Title	Music	Length
35.	"Sōryokusen" (総力戦 All-Out War)	Shinji Miyazaki	1:51
36.	"Fukutsu no Pokémon" (不屈のポケモン The Invincible Pokémon)	Shinji Miyazaki	2:04
37.	"Ikken Rakuchaku" (一件落着 A Settled Matter)	Shinji Miyazaki	1:55

Chapter.15 Afterwards, Clear these Tears (涙,のち晴れ, Namida, Nochi Hare)
No.	Title	Music	Length
38.	"Namida, Nochi Hare" (涙,のち晴れ Afterwards, Clear these Tears)	Shinji Miyazaki	2:13

Chapter.16 And the Adventure Continues (そして,冒険は続く, Soshite, Bōken wa Tsuzuku)
No.	Title	Music	Length
39.	"Deai to Wakare to" (出会いと別れと Meeting and Separating)	Shinji Miyazaki	1:30
40.	"Shōri no Bajji Getto da ze!" (勝利のバッジゲットだぜ！ Get a Badge of Victory!)	Shinji Miyazaki	2:02
41.	"Tsuzukuttara, Tsuzuku" (続くったら,続く Continue, Continue)	Shinji Miyazaki	2:59

No.	Title	Lyrics	Music	Performed by	Length
42.	"Poketto ni Fantajī" (ポケットにファンタジー Fantasy in My Pocket)	Akihito Toda	Hirokazu Tanaka	Sachiko Kobayashi & Juri Ihata	1:33

=== Pokémon World ===
Pokémon World is a CD single released in the United States and Canada on February 8, 2000, by Koch Records. The first track is the theme song for Adventures on the Orange Islands, the second season of the anime. Its Koch Records catalog number is 8903.

==== Track list ====
No.	Title	Performed by	Length
1.	"Pokémon World"	Russell Velázquez	3:15
2.	"Pikachu's Winter Vacation"	Russell Velázquez	1:57
3.	"Pikachu's Winter Vacation (instrumental)"	Louis Cortelezzi	1:57

=== Totally Pokémon ===
Totally Pokémon

Soundtrack album by Various artists
- Released: January 23, 2001
- Recorded: Summer 2000
- Genre: Pop
- Length: 74:30
- Label: Koch Records
- Producer: John Loeffler

Totally Pokémon is the second soundtrack released for the anime. This time, it includes songs from the anime's third season, The Johto Journeys.

==== Track list ====
No.	Title	Length
1.	"Pokémon Johto"	2:53
2.	"Pikachu (I Choose You)"	4:05
3.	"All We Wanna Do"	3:59
4.	"The Game"	4:40
5.	"He Drives Me Crazy"	3:29
6.	"You & Me & Pokémon"	4:06
7.	"Biggest Part of My Life"	4:19
8.	"Do Ya Really Wanna Play?"	4:09
9.	"Song of Jigglypuff"	4:21
10.	"Two Perfect Girls"	3:37
11.	"Never Too Far from Home"	3:23
12.	"Pokérap GS"	4:14
13.	"Pokémon Johto" (Karaoke Version)	2:53
14.	"Pikachu (I Choose You)" (Karaoke Version)	4:05
15.	"All We Wanna Do" (Karaoke Version)	3:59
16.	"You & Me & Pokémon" (Karaoke Version)	4:08
17.	"Song of Jigglypuff" (Karaoke Version)	4:21
18.	"Two Perfect Girls" (Karaoke Version)	3:38
19.	"Pokérap GS" (Karaoke Version)	4:11

=== Pokémon Christmas Bash ===
Pokémon Christmas Bash

Soundtrack album by Various artists
- Released: October 23, 2001
- Recorded: 2001
- Genres: Christmas, pop
- Length: Unknown
- Label: Koch Records
- Producer: Unknown

Pokémon Christmas Bash is a soundtrack CD album of Pokémon-themed Christmas songs performed by cast of the 4Kids Entertainment English anime dub. It was only released in America and Germany, called "Pokémon Weihnachts Party".

==== Track list ====
No.	Title	Length
1.	"Pokémon Christmas Bash"	4:18
2.	"I'm Giving Santa a Pikachu for Christmas"	2:47
3.	"Winter is the Coolest Time of Year"	2:23
4.	"Nobody Don't Like Christmas"	3:01
5.	"I Keep My Home in My Heart"	3:25
6.	"The Christmas Song"	2:53
7.	"Under the Mistletoe"	3:31
8.	"Must Be Santa"	2:11
9.	"The Night Before Christmas"	4:24
10.	"Christmas Medley"	3:47
11.	"I'm Giving Santa a Pikachu for Christmas" (Karaoke Version)	2:48
12.	"Christmas Medley" (Karaoke Version)	3:47

=== Pokémon X: 10 Years of Pokémon ===
Pokémon X: 10 Years of Pokémon

Soundtrack album by Various artists
- Released: March 27, 2007
- Recorded: 1998–2007
- Genres: Pop, rock, pop punk
- Length: 44:55
- Label: Koch Records

Pokémon X: 10 Years of Pokémon is an album released for the tenth anniversary of Pokémon. This CD consists of nine Pokémon theme songs from the first nine seasons, including several tracks from other albums. A CD sampler was released alongside the DVD release of Pokémon Ranger and the Temple of the Sea exclusively at Toys "R" Us. U.S. Target stores also released a sampler with the movie and included an exclusive bonus remix of the Hoenn Pokérap. Both samplers contained five tracks taken from Pokémon X. But sadly, Pokémon X: 10 Years of Pokémon album has been decreased tracks from 18 to 13 in 2016.

==== Track list ====
No.	Title	Note	Length
1.	"Pokémon Theme (Season Theme)" (with John Siegler/John Loeffler)	Theme of Indigo League	3:18
2.	"PokéRap" (with John Siegler/John Loeffler)	Pokémon 1 – 150	3:04
3.	"Pokémon World (Season Theme)" (with John Loeffler/John Siegler)	Theme of Adventures on the Orange Islands	1:02
4.	"2.B.A. Master" (with Russell Velázquez/John Loeffler)		4:04
5.	"Together Forever" (with Ken Cummings/John Loeffler)		3:55
6.	"Double Trouble (Team Rocket)" (with Louis Cortelezzi/Bob Mayo/John Loeffler)		3:53
7.	"Pokémon Johto (Season Theme)" (with John Loeffler/John Siegler)	Theme of The Johto Journeys	2:54
8.	"Pokérap GS" (with John Loeffler/John Siegler)	Pokémon 152 – 250	4:12
9.	"Born to Be a Winner (Season Theme)" (with John Loeffler/John Siegler)	Theme of Johto League Champions	0:49
10.	"Believe in Me (Season Theme)" (with David Rolfe/John Siegler)	Theme of Master Quest	0:47
11.	"I Want to Be a Hero (Season Theme)" (with David Rolfe/John Siegler)	Theme of Pokémon Advanced	0:49
12.	"This Dream (Season Theme)" (with David Rolfe/John Siegler)	Theme of Advanced Challenge	0:48
13.	"Unbeatable (Season Theme)" (with David Rolfe/John Siegler)	Theme of Advanced Battle	1:01
14.	"Battle Frontier (Season Theme)" (with John Loeffler/David Wolfert)	Theme of Battle Frontier	1:05
15.	"Hoenn Pokérap" (with Andrew Sherman/Ethan Eubanks)	Pokémon 151, 251 – 262, 264 – 368, 370 – 386	4:19
16.	"Best Friends" (with John Loeffler/David Wolfert)		2:26
17.	"Stay Together" (with NiNi Camps/Gary Philips)		2:28
18.	"Go Pokémon Go" (with Lawrence Neves/Atsushi 'Toya' Tokuya)		4:46

==== Pokémon X: Toys "R" Us sampler track list ====
No.	Title	Note	Length
1.	"Pokémon Theme (Season Theme)" (with John Siegler/John Loeffler)	Theme of Indigo League	3:18
2.	"PokéRap" (with John Siegler/John Loeffler)	Pokémon 1 – 150	3:04
3.	"Together Forever" (with Ken Cummings/John Loeffler)		3:55
4.	"I Want to Be a Hero (Season Theme)" (with David Rolfe/John Siegler)	Theme of Pokémon Advanced	0:49
5.	"Stay Together" (with NiNi Camps/Gary Philips)		2:28

==== Pokémon X: target sampler track list ====
No.	Title	Note	Length
1.	"Pokémon Theme (Season Theme)" (with John Siegler/John Loeffler)	Theme of Indigo League	3:18
2.	"PokéRap" (with John Siegler/John Loeffler)	Pokémon 1 – 150	3:04
3.	"Together Forever" (with Ken Cummings/John Loeffler)		3:55
4.	"I Want to Be a Hero (Season Theme)" (with David Rolfe/John Siegler)	Theme of Pokémon Advanced	0:49
5.	"Hoenn Pokérap" (with Andrew Sherman/Ethan Eubanks)	Pokémon 151, 251 – 262, 264 – 368, 370 – 386	4:18

==== Pokémon X: 2016 reissue ====
No.	Title	Note	Length
1.	"Pokémon Theme (Season Theme)" (with John Siegler/John Loeffler)	Theme of Indigo League	3:18
2.	"PokéRap" (with John Siegler/John Loeffler)	Pokémon 1 – 150	3:04
3.	"Pokémon World (Season Theme)" (with John Loeffler/John Siegler)	Theme of Adventures on the Orange Islands	1:02
4.	"2.B.A. Master" (with Russell Velázquez/John Loeffler)		4:04
5.	"Together Forever" (with Ken Cummings/John Loeffler)		3:55
6.	"Double Trouble (Team Rocket)" (with Louis Cortelezzi/Bob Mayo/John Loeffler)		3:53
7.	"Pokémon Johto (Season Theme)" (with John Loeffler/John Siegler)	Theme of The Johto Journeys	2:54
8.	"Pokérap GS" (with John Loeffler/John Siegler)	Pokémon 152 – 250	4:12
9.	"Born to Be a Winner (Season Theme)" (with John Loeffler/John Siegler)	Theme of Johto League Champions	0:49
10.	"I Want to Be a Hero (Season Theme)" (with David Rolfe/John Siegler)	Theme of Pokémon Advanced	0:49
11.	"Battle Frontier (Season Theme)" (with John Loeffler/David Wolfert)	Theme of Battle Frontier	1:05
12.	"Stay Together" (with NiNi Camps/Gary Philips)		2:28
13.	"Go Pokémon Go" (with Lawrence Neves/Atsushi 'Toya' Tokuya)		4:46

=== Pocket Monsters Original Soundtrack Best 1997–2010 ===
Pocket Monsters Original Soundtrack Best 1997–2010

Soundtrack album by Shinji Miyazaki
- Released: September 8, 2010
- Recorded: 1997–2010
- Length: 2:13:19
- Label: Pikachu Records

Pocket Monsters Original Soundtrack Best 1997–2010 is an album that is released two weeks before the debut of Pokémon: Best Wishes! in Japan. It has all of the songs divided into two volumes.
