= Pokémon X (disambiguation) =

Pokémon X is one of two paired games for the Nintendo 3DS.

Pokémon X may also refer to:

- Pokémon X: Ten Years of Pokémon, an album released for the tenth anniversary of Pokémon.
- Lugia, a Pokémon referred to as Pokémon X leading up to the release of the movie Pokémon: The Power of One.
- Pokémon Crystal, a game known as Pokémon X prior to its release.
