= Erin Bowman =

American pop singer and songwriter (born 1990)

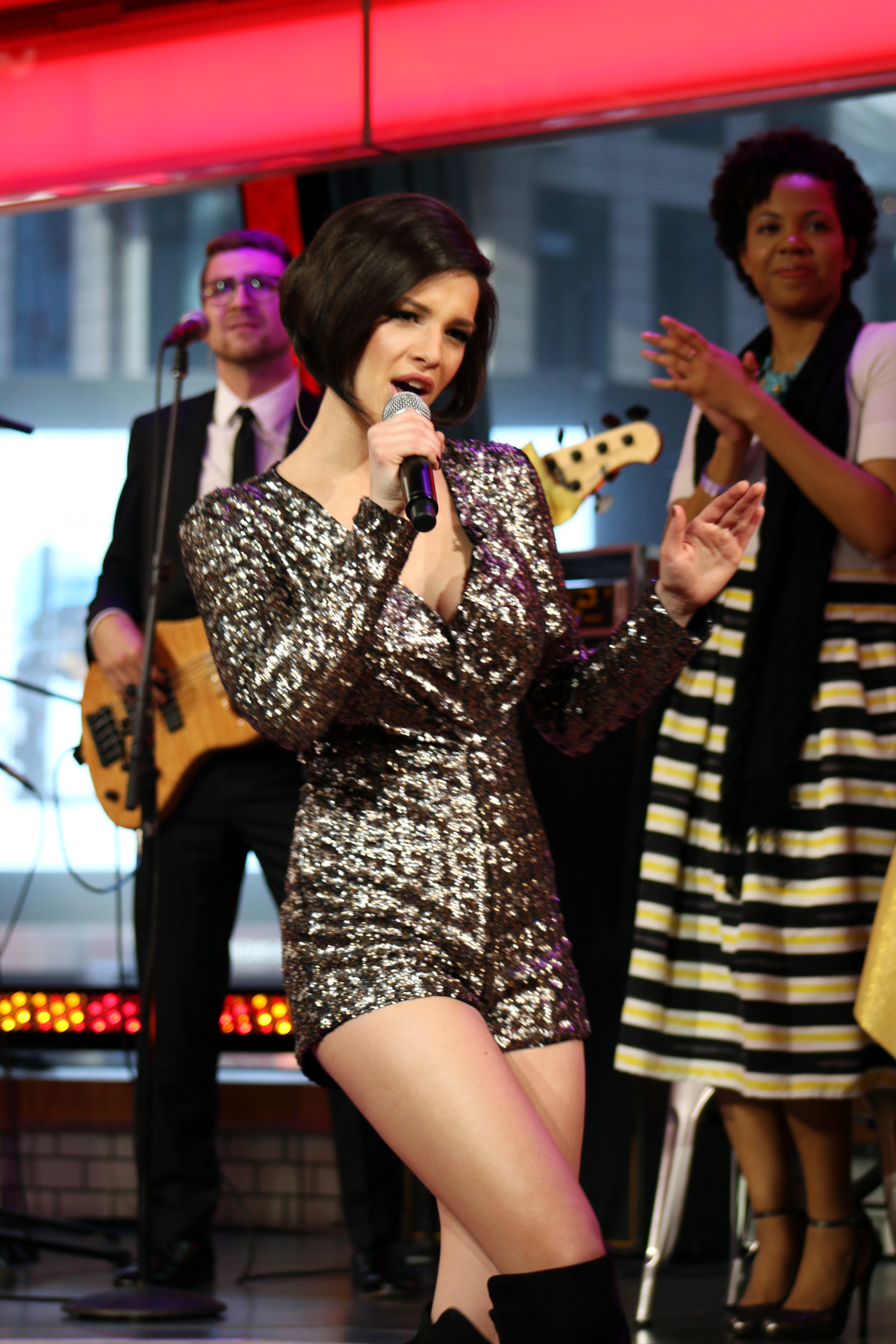
- Erin Bowman performing on Good Morning America in 2017

Background information
- Born: August 11, 1990 (age 35); Hamilton, New Jersey, US
- Genres: Pop
- Occupations: Singer, songwriter
- Instruments: Vocals; guitar
- Years active: 2008–present
- Label: Independent
- Website: www.erinbowmanmusic.com

Erin Bowman (born August 11, 1990) is an American pop singer and songwriter. She is an independent artist whose first single "Problem" debuted in the United States on November 1, 2011.

== Early life ==
Bowman was born on August 11, 1990, and raised in Hamilton Township, Mercer County, New Jersey. She attended Steinert High School, graduating in 2008. Bowman has been singing her whole life, at a variety of venues, including school performances, talent shows all over New Jersey including the Jersey shore, and malls in New Jersey and Pennsylvania. In eighth grade Bowman's choir teacher took notice and gave Bowman her first solo performance. After graduating from high school, Bowman began going to New York City meeting with producers, auditioning for production companies and girl groups. She started working with a producer in New York and began writing and recording original music at the age of 18.

== Music career ==
At the age of 18, Bowman was commuting to New York City writing and recording her music. Composer David Wolfert, working a few doors down from the studio, overheard one of Bowman's tracks. Wolfert, at that time, was looking for a female singer for Diamond & Pearl: Galactic Battles, the twelfth season of the Pokémon animated series, and approached Bowman. She agreed to sing the opening theme song, "Battle Cry (Stand Up!)"" along with "Black and White" for Pokémon: Black & White, and "I Believe in You" for Zoroark: Master of Illusions.

Bowman launched her solo career on November 1, 2011, by releasing her debut single "Problem" to top 40 radio in the United States. The first radio station to play "Problem" on a full-time basis was SiriusXM channel 3, 20 on 20, where it became a top 5 requested song in less than 4 weeks. In early 2012, Bowman began doing promotional tours throughout the United States that included live performances and radio interviews. Some of Bowman's first stops were Z100 New York and Krave Las Vegas. By the end of summer, Bowman had appeared in 10 states and 17 cities. She continued in the fall with 'Erin Bowman's School of Pop Tour' performing in over 20 schools throughout the Mid-Atlantic states. Bowman's second single, "King Boy", was released in June 2013 and became the fifth most played song on Sirius XM's 20 on 20 for the year.

The success of "King Boy" led to recording with many producers in 2014, and in the spring she released "Hey Summer", which made a major impact in a number of local markets. In the fall, Bowman co-wrote and recorded "Keep Me Warm", which was picked up by McDonald's for their McCafe White Chocolate Mocha TV commercial that first aired on the 7th game of the World Series, and continued to run on national TV for the remainder of the year and received airplay on 3 radio formats: AC (Adult Contemporary), Hot AC, and Top 40. In 2014, she recorded an EP titled Is Anybody Listening to Me?, but it was never officially released.

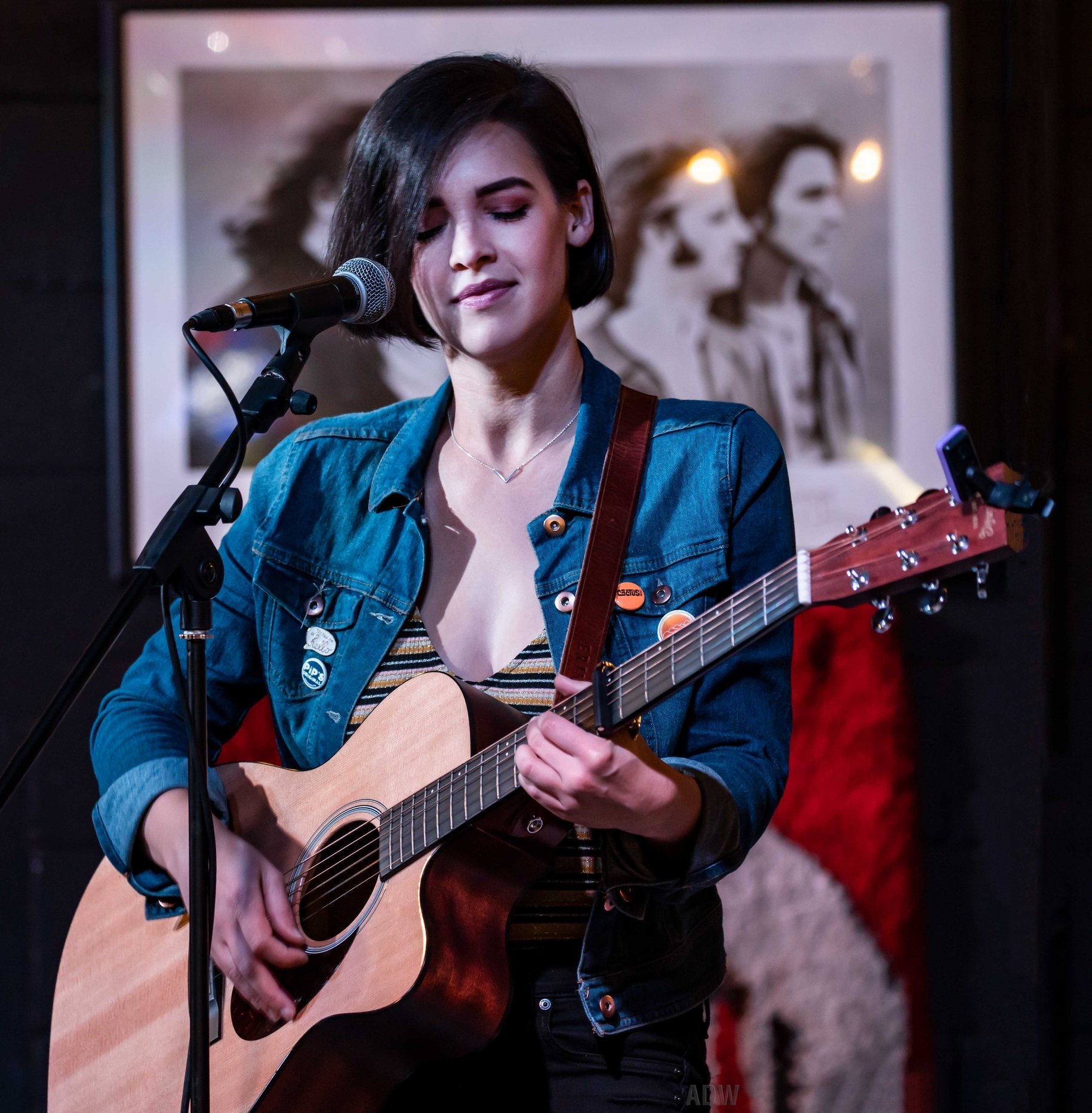
Erin Bowman at Record Archive, Rochester, NY Photo by Aaron Winters

In the summer of 2016, Bowman was signed to Kobalt Publishing and released "Good Time Good Life" where it debuted on NBC's This Is Us, opened an episode of CBS's Hawaii Five-0, was featured in Target’s Thanksgiving national TV campaign, and selected by The Academy of Motion Picture Arts and Sciences to drive The Oscars 2017 promo aired on the ABC TV network.

In 2017, Bowman made her national TV debut performing "Good Time Good Life" on ABC's Good Morning America, followed by a performance on the Radio Disney Music Awards and Live with Kelly and Ryan.

In 2019, Bowman released her debut EP, "Apartment 101". Written in her apartment in Los Angeles and recorded in London, ‘Apartment 101’ presented a new direction for Bowman with a down-to-earth, lyrically driven focus and beautifully shot videos for each song filmed from her very own apartment: Apartment 101. The release was support by Bowman's first U.S. tour of live performances at indie record stores, radio stations, and venues throughout the country.

== Songwriting and influences ==
Bowman began writing and recording songs at the age of 18. Her first song, "Problem", was originally called "What Your Problem is" that aired on season 4 episode 4 of Bad Girls Club in 2009 on the Oxygen Network. After her first song Bowman quickly moved on from writing chorus lyric ideas, to writing verse and chorus lyrics, to writing lyrics and melodies. Bowman's biggest influences include TLC, Spice Girls, Britney Spears, and Gwen Stefani.
