= Pokémon: Advanced Battle =

Eighth season of the Pokémon animated television series

- Season 8
- English front cover of the Pokémon: Advanced Battle DVD collection box
- No. of episodes: 53 (Japanese version); 52 (English version)

Release
- Original network: TV Tokyo
- Original release: September 9, 2004 – September 29, 2005

Season chronology
- ← Previous; Advanced Challenge Next → Battle Frontier

Pokémon: Advanced Battle is the eighth season of the Pokémon anime series and the third season of Pokémon the Series: Ruby and Sapphire, known in Japan as Pocket Monsters: Advanced Generation (ポケットモンスター アドバンスジェネレーション, Poketto Monsutā Adobansu Jenerēshon). It originally aired in Japan from September 9, 2004, to September 29, 2005, on TV Tokyo, and in the United States from November 5, 2005, to November 18, 2006, on Kids' WB.

This season follows Ash Ketchum as he continues travelling across the Hoenn region with Brock, May, and Max. Later on, they travel across the Kanto region to challenge its Battle Frontier.

The episodes were directed by Masamitsu Hidaka and produced by the animation studio OLM. This was the last season of the series to dubbed by 4Kids Entertainment after their contract expired, and the last to air on Kids' WB before moving to Cartoon Network.

== Episode list ==
Jap. overall	Eng. overall	No. in season	English title Japanese title	Original release date	English air date
369	366	1	"Clamperl of Wisdom" (Pearlulu and Baneboo! Seek the Pearl!); Transliteration: "Pāruru to Banebū! Shinju o Sagase!" (Japanese: パールルとバネブー！しんじゅをさがせ！)	September 9, 2004	November 5, 2005
On their way to Mossdeep Island, Ash and friends encounter a Spoink they had met before, which loses the pearl on its head again. Ash and friends visit an island, where they meet a scientist called Isaiah, who tells them that one of his Clamperl can help Spoink, since Clamperl make the same pearls Spoink have on their heads. However, things don't go right when Team Rocket meddles; will Ash and friends be able to find Spoink a pearl from Clampearl?
370	367	2	"The Relicanth Really Can" (Glanth and the Deep Sea Treasure!); Transliteration: "Jīransu to Shinkai no Hihō!" (Japanese: ジーランスと深海の秘宝！)	September 16, 2004	November 12, 2005
Ash and friends agree to help a treasure hunter named Adam look for buried treasure, but things get complicated when Team Rocket locks Ash and friends in a cave.
371	368	3	"The Evolutionary War" (Huntail and Sakurabyss! Mystery of Evolution!); Transliteration: "Hantēru to Sakurabisu! Shinka no Nazo!" (Japanese: ハンテールとサクラビス！進化の謎！)	September 23, 2004	November 19, 2005
There is a conflict on two islands: when Clamperl travels to one island, it evolves into Gorebyss, but on the other island it becomes Huntail.
372	369	4	"Training Wrecks" (Muscle Battle!? Double Battle!!); Transliteration: "Kinniku Batoru!? Daburu Batoru!!" (Japanese: 筋肉バトル！？ダブルバトル！！)	September 30, 2004	November 26, 2005
Ash has a double battle with a trainer called Rocky on Muscle Island.
373	370	5	"Gaining Groudon" (Groudon vs. Kyogre [Part 1]); Transliteration: "Gurādon Tai Kaiōga! (Zenpen)" (Japanese: グラードンVSカイオーガ! （前編）)	October 7, 2004	December 3, 2005
After a botched attempt from Team Rocket that sent both parties flying off the boat, Ash and his friends find themselves in the middle of a battle between Team Magma and Team Aqua, trying to control the Legendary Pokémon Groudon and Kyogre using the Red and Blue Orbs. However, Pikachu takes the Blue Orb away, and it absorbs into his body, possessing him.
374	371	6	"The Scuffle of Legends" (Groudon vs. Kyogre [Part 2]); Transliteration: "Gurādon Tai Kaiōga! (Kōhen)" (Japanese: グラードンVSカイオーガ! （後編）)	October 14, 2004	December 10, 2005
The battle between Team Magma and Team Aqua continues, with Pikachu now able to control Groudon, and Team Aqua boss Archie now being possessed by the Red Orb as it absorbs him into controlling Kyogre. Can Lance and his shiny red Gyarados return to solve the war between Team Magma and Team Aqua once and for all?
375	372	7	"It's Still Rocket Roll to Me" (Fuu and Ran! Space Center Battle!); Transliteration: "Fū to Ran! Uchū Senta no Tatakai!" (Japanese: フウとラン！宇宙センターの戦い！)	October 21, 2004	January 7, 2006
Team Rocket sneaks into a space shuttle in Mossdeep City and kidnaps Tate, Max, and Corphish.
376	373	8	"Solid as a Solrock" (Tokusane Gym! Solrock and Lunatone!); Transliteration: "Tokusane Jimu! Sorurokku to Runatōn!" (Japanese: トクサネジム！ソルロックとルナトーン！)	October 28, 2004	January 14, 2006
Ash duels Tate and Liza at the Mossdeep Gym, choosing Pikachu and Swellow against Lunatone and Solrock. At first, Tate and Liza argue with each other at the start of the battle but regain their focus after Team Rocket shows up.
N/A	N/A	N/A	Shaking Island Battle! Dojoach vs. Namazun!! Transliteration: "Yureru Shima no Tatakai! Dojotchi Tai Namazun!!" (Japanese: ゆれる島の戦い！ドジョッチVSナマズン！！)	N/A (Note: This episode was originally scheduled to air in Japan on November 4, 2004, but it was originally postponed due to the 2004 Chūetsu earthquake a week earlier. The episode was never aired in Japan or for international audiences.)	N/A
Ash and friends help Chōta get rid of the Barboach and Whiscash causing tremors on Jojo Island, when Team Rocket gets an idea to use the Pokémon for themselves. Note: This episode was originally scheduled to air in Japan on November 4, 2004, but it was originally postponed due to the 2004 Chūetsu earthquake a week earlier. The episode was never aired in Japan or for international audiences.
377	374	9	"Vanity Affair" (Seaman! Elite Four Genji Appears!!); Transliteration: "Umi no Otoko! Shitennō Genji Tōjō!!" (Japanese: 海の男！四天王ゲンジ登場！！)	November 4, 2004	January 21, 2006
Ash meets Drake, a member of the Hoenn Elite Four who has seen Ash getting overconfident previously, who invites him to come back to his ship for a Pokémon battle...an offer that Ash can't refuse!
378	375	10	"Where's Armaldo?" (Island of Dr. Moroboshi! Fossil Pokémon Appear!!); Transliteration: "Dokutā Moroboshi no Shima! Kaseki Pokemon Arawareru!!" (Japanese: ドクター・モロボシの島！化石ポケモン現る！！)	November 11, 2004	January 28, 2006
The scientist Professor Proctor revives the extinct Pokémon Anorith, which then evolves into Armaldo.
379	376	11	"A Cacturne for the Worse" (Izabe Island Pokémon Contest! Beware of the Rival!!); Transliteration: "Izabe Shima Pokemon Kontesuto! Ribaru Nikio Tsukero!!" (Japanese: イザベ島ポケモンコンテスト！ライバルに気をつけろ！！)	November 18, 2004	February 4, 2006
May meets a new rival, Harley, and gets into a huge conflict with him after he tries sabotaging her.
380	377	12	"Claydol Big and Tall" (Sealed the Huge Nendoll!!); Transliteration: "Kyodai Nendōru o Fūin se yo!!" (Japanese: 巨大ネンドールを封印せよ！！)	November 25, 2004	February 11, 2006
Ash, May, Max, Brock and Team Rocket try to trap a gigantic Claydol, who was released from a giant rock Poké Ball by Team Rocket in an attempt to capture it.
381	378	13	"Once in a Mawile" (Falling in Love with Kucheat! Hasubrero's Flower Arrangement!!); Transliteration: "Koi Suru Kuchīto! Hasuburero no Hanamichi!!" (Japanese: 恋するクチート！ハスブレロの花道！！)	December 2, 2004	February 18, 2006
A Mawile, owned by a trainer named Samantha, falls in love with Brock's Lombre while Ash's Corphish falls in love with the same Mawile and gets jealous about Lombre. Brock's Lombre finds a water stone and evolves into Ludicolo.
382	379	14	"Beg, Burrow and Steal" (Nuckrar and Vibrava! Lake of Illusion!!); Transliteration: "Nakkurā to Biburāba! Maboroshi no Mizuumi!!" (Japanese: ナックラーとビブラーバ！幻の湖！！)	December 9, 2004	February 25, 2006
Hal, a scientist, attempts to prove the existence of an underground lake where he saw Trapinch evolve into Vibrava when he was a child.
383	380	15	"Absol-ute Disaster" (Absol! Creeping Shadow of Disaster); Transliteration: "Abusoru! Shinobi Yoru Wazawai no Kage" (Japanese: アブソル！忍び寄るわざわいの影)	December 16, 2004	March 4, 2006
A village is convinced an Absol is causing all sorts of disasters, so Ash and a child called Nicky go to prove Absol is innocent and was trying to save the village from disaster.
384	381	16	"Let it Snow, Let it Snow, Let it Snorunt" (Catch Yukiwarashi!); Transliteration: "Yukiwarashi o Tsukamaero!" (Japanese: ユキワラシをつかまえろ！)	December 23, 2004	March 11, 2006
A wild Snorunt steals Ash's badge case, so Ash attempts to battle the ice-type Pokémon. After befriending Snorunt, Ash captures it.
385	382	17	"Do I Hear a Ralts?" (Rescue Ralts! Rush Masato!); Transliteration: "Rarutosu o Sukue! Isoge Masato!" (Japanese: ラルトスを救え！急げマサト！)	January 6, 2005	March 18, 2006
Max and Snorunt do their best to rescue a Ralts and reunite it with a Kirlia and Gardevoir by saving it from Team Rocket and helping it to overcome a fever.
386	383	18	"The Great Eight Fate!" (Rune Gym! Artist of Water – Adan! [Part 1]); Transliteration: "Rune Jimu! Mizu no Ātisuto, Adan! (Zenpen)" (Japanese: ルネジム！水のアーティスト・アダン！（前編）)	January 13, 2005	March 25, 2006
Ash battles Juan of Sootopolis City with Ash hoping to earn his final badge to qualify for the Hoenn League.
387	384	19	"Eight Ain't Enough" (Rune Gym! Artist of Water – Adan! [Part 2]); Transliteration: "Rune Jimu! Mizu no Ātisuto, Adan! (Kōhen)" (Japanese: ルネジム！水のアーティスト・アダン！（後編）)	January 20, 2005	March 25, 2006
Ash faces his toughest challenge yet as his Gym Battle against Juan and his Milotic continues. Juan's Milotic quickly proves to be an overwhelmingly powerful opponent. Can Ash pull off a last-minute victory or will Juan end Ash's Hoenn campaign?
388	385	20	"Showdown at Linoone" (Massaguma! The Shape of Friendship!?); Transliteration: "Massuguma! Yūjō no Katachi!?" (Japanese: マッスグマ！友情のカタチ！？)	January 27, 2005	April 8, 2006
A Linoone steals two of May's Pokéballs after it lost trust in its Trainer, Kimmy. Ash and friends help Kimmy to regain Linoone's trust.
389	386	21	"Who, What, When, Where, Wynaut?" (Sohnano of Illusion Island!); Transliteration: "Maboroshi Shima no Sōnano!" (Japanese: まぼろし島のソーナノ！)	February 3, 2005	April 15, 2006
While aboard Team Rocket's Magikarp submarine, Max accidentally hits a switch that starts the turbo engine, causing Ash, his friends, Team Rocket, and Drew to wash up on Mirage Island which is known for producing rare litchi berries, where Wynaut live.
390	387	22	"Date Expectations" (Rollout! Loving Donfan!); Transliteration: "Korogare! Koi Suru Donfan!" (Japanese: ころがれ！恋するドンファン！)	February 10, 2005	April 22, 2006
A group of Donphan attempt to impress a shiny female Donphan.
391	388	23	"Mean with Envy" (Disorderly Melee! Pokémon Contest – Kinagi Tournament! [Part 1]); Transliteration: "Konsen, Konran! Pokemon Kontesuto, Kinagi Taikai! (Zenpen)" (Japanese: 混戦、混乱！ポケモンコンテスト・キナギ大会！（前編）)	February 17, 2005	May 6, 2006
The final Hoenn Pokémon Contest is underway, but May is distracted when one of her opponents, Erica, sees May as a rival for her boyfriend Joshua's affections.
392	389	24	"Pacifidlog Jam" (Disorderly Melee! Pokémon Contest – Kinagi Tournament! [Part 2]); Transliteration: "Konsen, Konran! Pokemon Kontesuto, Kinagi Taikai! (Kōhen)" (Japanese: 混戦、混乱！ポケモンコンテスト・キナギ大会！（後編）)	February 24, 2005	May 13, 2006
May's final Hoenn Contest to take part in the Hoenn Grand Festival continues as Skitty battles Joshua's Houndoom, while Jessie is disqualified by making Meowth use a fake Transform move through costume changes.
393	390	25	"Berry, Berry Interesting" (Get Gonbe with Haruka Delicious!!); Transliteration: "Haruka Derishasu de, Gonbe Getto kamo!!" (Japanese: ハルカデリシャスで、ゴンベGETかも！！)	March 3, 2005	May 20, 2006
Several Trainers accuse a Munchlax of eating their PokéBlock, so May catches it to prove its innocence.
394	391	26	"Less is Morrison" (The Rivals Appears! Masamune and the Dumbber!!); Transliteration: "Raibaru Tōjō! Masamune to Danbaru!!" (Japanese: ライバル登場！マサムネとダンバル！！)	March 10, 2005	May 27, 2006
While on the way to the Hoenn Grand Festival, the group meets a Beldum trainer named Morrison. After hearing that Morrison also intends to enter the Hoenn League, a new rivalry between Ash and Morrison is born.
395	392	27	"The Ribbon Cup Caper!" (Mysterious Thief Bannai and the Ribbon Cup!!); Transliteration: "Kaitō Bannai to Ribon Kappu!!" (Japanese: 怪盗バンナイとリボンカップ！！)	March 17, 2005	June 3, 2006
The master of disguise of Team Magma, Brodie, is back, and this time he's after the Hoenn Grand Festival's Ribbon Cup. With the help of Officer Jenny and Contesta, Ash and the others are determined to find the trophy and return it before the Hoenn Grand Festival begins.
396	—	28	Satoshi and Haruka! Heated Battles in Hoenn!! Transliteration: "Satoshi to Haruka! Hōen de no Atsuki Batoru!!" (Japanese: サトシとハルカ！ホウエンでの熱きバトル！！)	March 24, 2005 (Note: This episode was never broadcast in the United States.)	—
While on the way to Slateport City, Ash and May look back at their previous gym battles and contest battles, respectively.
397	393	29	"Hi Ho Silver Wind!" (Begin! Grand Festival [1]!!); Transliteration: "Kaimaku! Gurando Fesutibaru, Wan!!" (Japanese: 開幕！グランドフェスティバル①！！)	April 7, 2005	June 10, 2006
The gang finally arrives in Slateport City for the Hoenn Grand Festival where May is welcomed by her mom and letters from all the friends she met previously.
398	394	30	"Deceit and Assist" (Fierce Fighting! Grand Festival [2]!!); Transliteration: "Nettō! Gurando Fesutibaru, Tsū!!" (Japanese: 熱闘！グランドフェスティバル②！！)	April 7, 2005	June 17, 2006
May, Drew and Harley face off in the second round.
399	395	31	"Rhapsody in Drew" (Deciding Match! Grand Festival [3]!!); Transliteration: "Kessen! Gurando Fesutibaru, Surī!!" (Japanese: 決戦！グランドフェスティバル③！！)	April 7, 2005	June 24, 2006
May advances and battles against Drew in a Pokémon double battle. Who will win? After Ash receives tips from the Coordinator Robert on how to master Snorunt's Ice Beam move, Snorunt evolves into Glalie.
400	396	32	"Island Time" (Let's Go with Survival!); Transliteration: "Sabaibaru de Ikō!" (Japanese: サバイバルでいこう！)	April 14, 2005	July 8, 2006
May receives free plane tickets from a disguised Team Rocket, and the plane ride is really a trip back to Team Rocket HQ! Team Rocket later crashes the plane with Ash and friends on-board on a deserted island, which is home to the castaway Robin and his Wailmer.
401	397	33	"Like a Meowth to a Flame" (Arrival in Saiyū City! Nyarth in Boots!?); Transliteration: "Saiyū Shiti Tōchaku! Nagagutsu o Haita Nyāsu!?" (Japanese: サイユウシティ到着！長靴をはいたニャース！？)	April 21, 2005	July 15, 2006
Ash and his friends have finally arrived in Ever Grande City for the Hoenn League Conference, and along the way they meet Tyson, and his Meowth in Boots.
402	398	34	"Saved by the Beldum" (Start the Preliminaries! Masamune Appears!!); Transliteration: "Yobisen Sutāto! Masamune Tōjō!!" (Japanese: 予備選スタート！マサムネ登場!!)	April 28, 2005	July 22, 2006
Ash, Morrison and Tyson begin their first round battles in the Hoenn League Ever Grande Conference.
403	399	35	"From Brags to Riches" (Begin! Saiyū Tournament!!); Transliteration: "Kaimaku! Saiyū Taikai!!" (Japanese: 開幕！サイユウ大会！！)	May 5, 2005	July 22, 2006
Ash competes in the qualifying rounds of the Ever Grande Conference, which are double battles!
404	400	36	"Shocks and Bonds" (Towards the Tournament Finals! Everyday a Heated Battle!); Transliteration: "Kesshō Tōnamento e! Atsuki Tatakai no Hibi!" (Japanese: 決勝トーナメントへ！熱き戦いの日々！)	May 12, 2005	July 29, 2006
Ash is pitted against two fire-type Pokémon in the third double battle qualification round. He then finds out that his first opponent in the Victory Tournament is Katie, a strategic female Trainer who takes full advantage of type weaknesses and strengths.
405	401	37	"A Judgment Brawl" (And... Continue the Battle That Cannot Be Lost!!); Transliteration: "Soshite... Makerarenai Tatakai wa Tsuzuku!!" (Japanese: そして…負けられない戦いは続く！！)	May 19, 2005	July 29, 2006
Ash and Katie continue their battle in the Victory Tournament. After that, Ash finds out his next opponent is none other than Morrison, who is not sure about battling his new friend.
406	402	38	"Choose It or Lose It!" (Rival Showdown! Vs. Masamune!); Transliteration: "Raibaru Taiketsu! Tai Masamune!" (Japanese: ライバル対決！VSマサムネ！)	May 26, 2005	August 5, 2006
Ash and Morrison's battle continues on. After that, Ash finds out he is battling Tyson in the Ever Grande Conference Quarterfinals.
407	403	39	"At the End of the Fray" (The Last Fierce Fighting! The Road to the Championship!!); Transliteration: "Saigo no Gekitō! Yūshō e no Michi!!" (Japanese: 最後の激闘！優勝への道！！)	June 16, 2005	August 19, 2006
Ash and Tyson's Ever Grande Conference Quarterfinal match continue - pitting their last Pokémon - Pikachu and Meowth. Who will win?
408	404	40	"The Scheme Team" (Enishida and the Battle Frontier!); Transliteration: "Enishida to Batoru Furonteia!" (Japanese: エニシダとバトルフロンティア！)	June 23, 2005	August 19, 2006
The gang split up as they go their separate ways. Meanwhile, Ash visits Viridian City and discovers the new Gym Leader is Agatha of the Kanto Elite Four! Scott, a man who conveniently happens to be there, tells Ash about the Battle Frontier, encouraging Ash to enter. Ash is soon reunited by not just Delia, but Misty, Max, Professor Oak and Professor Birch as well!
409	405	41	"The Right Place and the Right Mime" (Ookido's Laboratory! Everybody Gather!!); Transliteration: "Ōkido Kenkyūsho! Zen'in Shūgō!!" (Japanese: オーキド研究所！全員集合！！)	June 30, 2005	August 26, 2006
Ash and May prepare for the challenge ahead of them, leaving some of their Pokémon at Professor Oak's lab. Before leaving, a Squirtle chooses May as its trainer. When Team Rocket show up to steal all of Ash's Pokémon - including Ash's Phanpy - the group must fight against them to stop their plan from succeeding.
410	406	42	"A Real Cleffa Hanger" (Mt. Otsukimi! With Py, Pippi and Pixy!); Transliteration: "Otsuki Miyama! Pii to Pippi to Pikushī to!" (Japanese: おつきみやま！ピィとピッピとピクシーと！)	July 7, 2005	August 26, 2006
Misty and Max try to return a Cleffa to Mount Moon.
411	407	43	"Numero Uno Articuno" (First Battle! Battle Factory!! [Part 1]); Transliteration: "Uijin! Batoru Fakutorī!! (Zenpen)" (Japanese: 初陣！バトルファクトリー！！（前編）)	July 21, 2005	September 2, 2006
At the Battle Factory, Ash and friends meet Factory Head Noland, the first Frontier Brain, and discover he has befriended the Legendary Ice Pokémon, Articuno!
412	408	44	"The Symbol Life" (First Battle! Battle Factory [Part 2]); Transliteration: "Uijin! Batoru Fakutorī!! (Kōhen)" (Japanese: 初陣！バトルファクトリー！！（後編）)	July 28, 2005	September 9, 2006
Ash's Charizard returns from Charcific Valley to duel with Articuno.
413	409	45	"Hooked on Onix" (The Kingdom of Iwark!!); Transliteration: "Iwāku no Ōkoku!!" (Japanese: イワークの王国！！)	August 4, 2005	September 16, 2006
When Team Rocket fools a King Onix, some Geodude, Graveler and Golem into believing that Ash wants to capture them, it spells disaster for Ash, Brock, May and Max as one by one, they and their Pokémon are captured and imprisoned by the Rock Pokémon.
414	410	46	"Rough, Tough Jigglypuff" (Purin's Song, Papa's Song!); Transliteration: "Purin no Uta, Papa no Uta!" (Japanese: プリンの歌、パパの歌！)	August 11, 2005	September 23, 2006
A man called Mitch tries to catch a Jigglypuff for his daughter Lisa's birthday, but this is the toughest Jigglypuff in the universe.
415	411	47	"On Cloud Arcanine" (Rival Showdown! Get Windie!); Transliteration: "Raibaru Taiketsu! Uindi o Getto Kamo!" (Japanese: ライバル対決！ウインディをゲットかも！)	August 18, 2005	September 30, 2006
May and Drew set their eyes on an Arcanine, although it uses its Extremespeed and Roar techniques to flee.
416	412	48	"Sitting Psyduck" (Koduck's Depression!); Transliteration: "Kodakku no Yūutsu!" (Japanese: コダックの憂鬱！)	August 25, 2005	October 7, 2006
A girl called Emily sends out a Machop, a Machoke and a Machamp to retrieve her depressed Psyduck.
417	413	49	"Hail to the Chef!" (Nyula and Barrierd! Whose Restaurant!?); Transliteration: "Nyūra to Bariyādo! Dotchi no Resutoran!?" (Japanese: ニューラとバリヤード！どっちのレストラン！？)	September 1, 2005	October 14, 2006
A Sneasel and a Mr. Mime have a cook-off to see who is a better chef.
418	414	50	"Caterpie's Big Dilemma" (Evolution! That Mystery and Wonder!!); Transliteration: "Shinka! Sono Shinpi to Kiseki!!" (Japanese: 進化！その神秘と奇跡！！)	September 8, 2005	October 21, 2006
The trainer Xander's Caterpie, along with Jessie's Dustox and James's Cacnea, grows to enormous size.
419	415	51	"The Saffron Con" (Pokémon Contest – Yamabuki Tournament!! [Part 1]); Transliteration: "Pokemon Kontesuto, Yamabuki Taikai!! (Zenpen)" (Japanese: ポケモンコンテスト・ヤマブキ大会！！（前編）)	September 15, 2005	October 28, 2006
It's time for the Saffron City Pokémon Contest and May's hoping to sign up, but Harley, her rival has a series of deceptive and sneaky tricks up his sleeve to make sure May doesn't even get the chance to enter.
420	416	52	"A Hurdle for Squirtle" (Pokémon Contest – Yamabuki Tournament!! [Part 2]); Transliteration: "Pokemon Kontesuto, Yamabuki Taikai!! (Kōhen)" (Japanese: ポケモンコンテスト・ヤマブキ大会！！（後編）)	September 22, 2005	November 4, 2006
The Saffron City Pokémon Contest begins and with May eager to win her first-ever Kanto ribbon, she chooses to enter with her Squirtle, but her enemy Harley is determined to make sure that she doesn't triumph.
421	417	53	"Pasta La Vista!" (Fighting Dojo! Satoshi vs. Haruka!); Transliteration: "Kakutō Dōjō! Satoshi Tai Haruka!" (Japanese: 格闘道場！サトシVSハルカ！)	September 29, 2005	November 18, 2006
Ash and Max go to the Saffron City fighting dojo to see some Fighting-type Pokémon, while May and Brock go to a noodle shop.

== Music ==
The Japanese opening songs are "Challenger!!" (チャレンジャー!!, Charenjā!!) by Rica Matsumoto for 13 episodes, "Pokemon Symphonic Medley" (ポケモンシンフォニック メドレー, Pokémon Shinfonikku Medorē) by the Pokémon Symphonic Orchestra (Pokémon Choir) for 29 episodes, and "Battle Frontier (Japanese song)" (バトルフロンツア, Batoru Furontia) by Akina Takaya for 11 episodes. The ending songs are "Smile" (スマイル, Sumairu) by Toshiko Ezaki for 6 episodes, "GLORY DAY 〜That Shining Day〜" (GLORY DAY 〜輝くその日〜, GLORY DAY 〜Kagayaku Sono Hi〜) by GARDEN for 35 episodes, "Pokémon Counting Song" (ポケモンかぞえうた, Pokémon Kazoe Uta) by Akiko Kanazawa for 11 episodes, and the English opening song is "Unbeatable" by David Rolfe, with a shortened version used in the end credits.

== Home media releases ==
In the United States, the series was released on 10 DVD volumes by Viz Media, each containing 5 or 6 episodes each.

Viz Media and Warner Home Video later released Pokémon: Advanced Battle – The Complete Collection on DVD on June 12, 2018.
