= Pokémon: Advanced Challenge =

Seventh season of the Pokémon animated television series

- Season 7
- English front cover of the Pokémon: Advanced Challenge DVD collection box
- No. of episodes: 52

Release
- Original network: TV Tokyo
- Original release: September 4, 2003 – September 2, 2004

Season chronology
- ← Previous; Advanced Next → Advanced Battle

Pokémon: Advanced Challenge is the seventh season of the Pokémon anime series and the second season of Pokémon the Series: Ruby and Sapphire, known in Japan as Pocket Monsters: Advanced Generation (ポケットモンスター アドバンスジェネレーション, Poketto Monsutā Adobansu Jenerēshon). It originally aired in Japan from September 4, 2003, to September 2, 2004, on TV Tokyo, and in the United States from October 9, 2004, to October 29, 2005, on Kids' WB.

The season follows Ash Ketchum as he continues travelling across the Hoenn region with Brock, May, and Max.

The episodes were directed by Masamitsu Hidaka and produced by the animation studio OLM.

== Episode list ==
Jap. overall	Eng. overall	No. in season	English title Japanese title	Original release date	English air date
317	314	1	"What You Seed is What You Get" (Kimori's New Technique!! Watermelon Field's Seed Machine Gun!); Transliteration: "Kimori no Shinwaza!! Suika Hatake no Tane Mashingan!" (Japanese: キモリの新技！！スイカ畑のタネマシンガン！)	September 4, 2003	October 9, 2004
After Ash, Brock, May and Max find some watermelons, Ash decides to teach Treecko how to use Bullet Seed, but the lesson is interrupted by Natasha, who accuses them of stealing her watermelons, and her Grovyle, Slugma and Electrode.
318	315	2	"Love at First Flight" (Barubeat and Illumise! Dance of Love!); Transliteration: "Barubīto to Irumīze! Ai no Dansu!" (Japanese: バルビートとイルミーゼ！愛のダンス！)	September 11, 2003	November 13, 2004
A Volbeat trainer named Romeo goes to May for tips on trying to confess his love for an Illumise trainer named Juliet.
319	316	3	"Let Bagons Be Bagons" (Fly Tatsubay! Towards the Future!!); Transliteration: "Tobe, Tatsubei! Ashita ni Mukatte!!" (Japanese: 飛べ、タツベイ！明日にむかって！！)	September 18, 2003	October 16, 2004
Ash and company encounter Michelle and her Bagon, which wishes to evolve into Shelgon and fly.
320	317	4	"The Princess and the Togepi" (Kasumi Appears! Togepi and the Mirage Kingdom!); Transliteration: "Kasumi Tōjō! Togepī to Maboroshi no Ōkoku!" (Japanese: カスミ登場！トゲピーとまぼろしの王国！)	September 25, 2003	October 23, 2004
Ash's former partner Misty arrives in Hoenn, but her reunion with Ash and Brock is cut short when an evil mercenary, Colonel Hansen, arrives and kidnaps her Togepi with the help of Team Rocket.
321	318	5	"A Togepi Mirage!" (Beyond the Mirage! Togepi's Paradise!); Transliteration: "Shinkirō no Kanata ni! Togepī no Rakuen!" (Japanese: 蜃気楼の彼方に！トゲピーの楽園！)	October 2, 2003	October 30, 2004
Colonel Hansen, Team Rocket and the gang are amazed when they see Togepi's amazing power in defending them. After escaping, Togepi takes the gang to a dimension populated by unhappy Togepi, which has caused the land to grow weak. However, when Misty's Togepi is captured by Colonel Hansen in order for him to rule the Mirage Kingdom, it leads to a confrontation, during which Togepi evolves into Togetic to save the other Togepi. Afterward, Misty releases Togetic to watch over the other dimension.
322	319	6	"Candid Camerupt!" (Kachinuki Family! 4 vs. 4!!); Transliteration: "Kachinuki Famirī! Yon Tai Yon!!" (Japanese: かちぬきファミリー！4VS4！！)	October 9, 2003	November 6, 2004
The Winstrate Family rescue Ash and company from dying of thirst and in return insist on a 4-on-4 Pokémon battle against them.
323	320	7	"I Feel Skitty!" (Eneko and Aromatherapy!); Transliteration: "Eneko to Aromaterapī!" (Japanese: エネコとアロマテラピー！)	October 16, 2003	November 20, 2004
After finding a sick Skitty, May and the gang take it to a Pokémon aromatherapy lab to heal it. When Team Rocket tries to steal the assorted fragrances, Meowth falls in love with the now-energetic Skitty, who joins May's party.
324	321	8	"ZigZag Zangoose!" (Zangoose vs. Habunake! Rivals Showdown!!); Transliteration: "Zangūsu Tai Habunēku! Raibaru Taiketsu!!" (Japanese: ザングースVSハブネーク！ライバル対決！！)	October 23, 2003	November 27, 2004
Nicolai returns with a new Zangoose. However, Jessie's Seviper appears, and with Zangoose and Seviper being natural enemies, the two Pokémon begin to fight vigorously.
325	322	9	"Maxxed Out!" (Masato and Masato! Protect Ametama!); Transliteration: "Masato to Masato! Ametama o Mamore!" (Japanese: マサトとマサト！アメタマを守れ！)	October 30, 2003	December 4, 2004
The gang finds a boy who looks and sounds almost exactly like Max and they both even have the same name, only this new Max has a real attitude problem which brings out the worst in the first Max! Can both Maxes put their differences aside and protect a Surskit from Team Rocket?
326	323	10	"Pros and Con Artists" (Pokémon Contest – Hajitsuge Tournament!!); Transliteration: "Pokemon Kontesuto, Hajitsuge Taikai!!" (Japanese: ポケモンコンテスト・ハジツゲ大会！！)	November 6, 2003	December 11, 2004
The gang meets a girl named Grace with a Medicham who is going to enter the contest in Fallarbor Town. Meanwhile, Team Rocket conducts a scam while May experiences mixed feelings about being in the contest.
327	324	11	"Come What May!" (VS Charem! Contest Battle!!); Transliteration: "VS Chāremu! Kontesuto Batoru!!" (Japanese: VSチャーレム！コンテストバトル！！)	November 13, 2003	January 29, 2005
May participates in the Fallarbor Town Pokémon Contest. Will she win and earn her first contest ribbon?
328	325	12	"Cheer Pressure" (Plusle and Minun! Road of Cheering!?); Transliteration: "Purasuru to Mainan! Ōen no Michi!?" (Japanese: プラスルとマイナン！応援の道！？)	November 20, 2003	January 29, 2005
Ash and friends re-encounter Thatcher and find that he's joined a cheerleading squad for Pokémon Trainers.
329	326	13	"Game Winning Assist" (Eneco and Cat's Paw! Meadow of Donmel!); Transliteration: "Eneko to Neko no te! Donmeru no Bokujō!" (Japanese: エネコとねこのて！ドンメルの牧場！)	November 27, 2003	February 5, 2005
After getting chased out of a cave by Slugma, Ash and friends end up at a Numel farm.
330	327	14	"Fight for the Meteorite" (Team Aqua vs. Team Magma Again! Battle of Mt. Chimney!!); Transliteration: "Maguma-dan Tai Akua-dan, Futatabi! Entotsu Yama no Tatakai!!" (Japanese: マグマ団VSアクア団、再び！えんとつ山の戦い！！)	December 4, 2003	February 12, 2005
Team Aqua and Team Magma fight over a stolen meteorite at Mt. Chimney, trapping the gang in a cable car with Team Rocket, with Ash attempting to recover the space rock from the criminal organizations after escaping the cable car through a deadly stunt.
331	328	15	"Poetry Commotion!" (The New Gym Leader – Asuna! The Hole-Filled Battlefield!); Transliteration: "Shinjin Jimu Rīdā, Asuna! Anadarake no Batoru Fīrudo!" (Japanese: 新人ジムリーダー・アスナ！穴だらけのバトルフィールド！)	December 11, 2003	February 19, 2005
Ash and friends finally arrive at the Lavaridge Gym. There, they meet Flannery, who was recently given control of the gym by her grandfather, Mr. Moore. However, the grounds are a mess, and will need fixing before any official battle can begin.
332	329	16	"Going, Going, Yawn" (Heat Badge! Win the Blazing Battle!!); Transliteration: "Hīto Bajji! Moeru Batoru de Getto da ze!!" (Japanese: ヒートバッジ！燃えるバトルでゲットだぜ！！)	December 18, 2003	February 26, 2005
Ash faces off against Flannery to win the Heat Badge.
333	330	17	"Going for a Spinda" (Full of Patcheel! Beyond the Mountains in Search of Happiness!); Transliteration: "Patchīru Ga Ippai! Shiawase Sagashite Yama no Kanata ni!" (Japanese: パッチールがいっぱい！幸せさがして山の彼方に！)	December 25, 2003	March 5, 2005
Ash and friends must help Claire find a lucky Spinda she's been caring for, but why is it deliberately running away from her?
334	331	18	"All Torkoal, No Play" (Breakthrough Valley of Steel! Cotoise vs. Haganeil!!); Transliteration: "Hagane no Tani o Toppa se yo! Kōtasu Tai Haganēru!!" (Japanese: ハガネの谷を突破せよ！コータスVSハガネール！！)	January 8, 2004	March 12, 2005
Ash and friends enter the Valley of Steel where they see a Torkoal being bullied by a group of Steel-type Pokémon, led by a Steelix. Ash rescues the Torkoal, adding a new member to his team.
335	332	19	"Manectric Charge" (Kinetsu Gym Returns! Vs. Livolt!!); Transliteration: "Kinsetsu Jimu Futatabi! Tai Raiboruto!!" (Japanese: キンセツジムふたたび！VSライボルト！！)	January 15, 2004	March 19, 2005
Wattson's Electrike evolves into Manectric, and he challenges Ash's Torkoal to a practice battle. Meanwhile, Team Rocket is getting the unwanted ride of their lives.
336	333	20	"Delcatty Got Your Tongue" (Eneko and Enekororo! The Legendary Pokémon Coordinator Appears!!); Transliteration: "Eneko to Enekororo! Densetsu no Kōdeinētā Tōjō!!" (Japanese: エネコとエネコロロ！伝説のコーディネーター登場！！)	January 22, 2004	March 26, 2005
While on the way to the Pokémon Contest in Verdanturf Town, May's Skitty learns how to use Blizzard when it and Dr. Abby's Delcatty are kidnapped by Team Rocket.
337	334	21	"Disaster of Disguise" (The Masked Coordinator – Phantom Appears!!); Transliteration: "Kamen no Kōdeinētā, Fantomu Tōjō!!" (Japanese: 仮面のコーディネーター・ファントム登場！！)	January 29, 2004	April 2, 2005
May hears from Drew that his Roselia was badly injured by a masked trainer's Dusclops. Eventually, Ash, Brock, May and Max find this trainer themselves, but soon discover it is a kid named Timmy. Apparently his mother loathes Pokémon, and he masquerades as the Phantom Coordinator in order to get in training. They decide to help him find a way to compete in the next Pokémon Contest.
338	335	22	"Disguise Da Limit" (Shidake Town! Pokémon Contest!!); Transliteration: "Shidake Taun! Pokemon Kontesuto!!" (Japanese: シダケタウン！ポケモンコンテスト！！)	February 5, 2004	April 2, 2005
Continuing from the previous episode, May and Timmy compete in the Verdanturf Town Pokémon Contest. Now with his mother's approval, Timmy pits his Dusclops against May's Skitty.
339	336	23	"Take the Lombre Home" (Solrock and Hasubrero! Legend of the Sacred Forest!); Transliteration: "Sorurokku to Hasuburero! Seinaru Mori no Densetsu!" (Japanese: ソルロックとハスブレロ！聖なる森の伝説！)	February 12, 2004	April 9, 2005
Brock's Lotad evolves into a Lombre, who is sought as a savior by a small village suffering from a drought.
340	337	24	"True Blue Swablu" (Sky of Tyltto! Heart of Haruka!!); Transliteration: "Chirutto no Sora! Haruka no Kokoro!!" (Japanese: チルットの空！ハルカの心！！)	February 19, 2004	April 16, 2005
On their way to Petalburg City, Ash and his friends help a sick Swablu get back to its flock.
341	338	25	"Gulpin it Down" (The Great Gokulin Repelling Strategy!!); Transliteration: "Gokurin Gekitai Daisakusen!!" (Japanese: ゴクリン撃退大作戦！！)	February 26, 2004	April 23, 2005
Due to a freak accident, a Gulpin and Ash's Treecko grow to the size of Godzilla. In the end, the massive Gulpin gets caught by a machine expert called Professor Jacuzzi who uses a Heavy Ball.
342	339	26	"Exploud and Clear" (Critical Situation! Bakuong vs. Juptile!!); Transliteration: "Isshokusokuhatsu! Bakuongu Tai Juputoru!!" (Japanese: 一触即発！バクオングVSジュプトル！！)	March 4, 2004	April 30, 2005
Ash's Treecko evolves into a Grovyle while battling a Loudred. However, the Loudred also evolves into an Exploud and goes on a rampage, refusing to obey its trainer, Guy, and Grovyle (who has even more of an attitude than before) is determined to finish its battle with Exploud.
343	340	27	"Go Go Ludicolo!" (Dancing Battle! Runpappa!!); Transliteration: "Odoru Batoru da! Runpappa!!" (Japanese: 踊るバトルだ！ルンパッパ！！)	March 11, 2004	May 7, 2005
Corphish is now jealous of Grovyle's recent evolution and takes on the trainer Poncho and his Ludicolo. Corphish later realizes its mistake and helps Poncho and his Ludicolo against Team Rocket.
344	341	28	"A Double Dilemma" (Papa is Idol!? Fake Gym Leader!!); Transliteration: "Papa wa Aidoru!? Itsuwari no Jimu Rīdā!!" (Japanese: パパはアイドル！？いつわりのジムリーダー！！)	March 18, 2004	May 14, 2005
Ash returns to Petalburg City, only to discover that Norman, May and Max's father, has become a major celebrity. To take advantage of this, Team Rocket disguises themselves as May and Max's family.
345	342	29	"Love, Petalburg Style!" (Tōka Gym Crisis! Household Crisis!!); Transliteration: "Tōka Jimu no Kiki! Katei no Kiki!!" (Japanese: トウカジムの危機！家庭の危機！！)	March 25, 2004	May 21, 2005
When it appears that Norman is flirting with Nurse Joy, everyone else comes to the conclusion that he has dumped Caroline.
346	343	30	"Balance of Power" (Tōka Gym! The Fifth Badge!!); Transliteration: "Tōka Jimu Sen! Itsutsu me no Bajji!!" (Japanese: トウカジム戦！五つ目のバッジ！！)	April 1, 2004	May 28, 2005
Ash finally gets a rematch with Norman, but Max and May are conflicted with not wanting to see either Ash or their father lose...and the outcome may be harder than they can handle.
347	344	31	"A Six Pack Attack!" (Professor Ookido and Professor Odamaki! Secret Base Battle!!); Transliteration: "Ōkido-hakase to Odamaki-hakase! Himitsukichi no Tatakai!!" (Japanese: オーキド博士とオダマキ博士！秘密基地の戦い！！)	April 8, 2004	June 4, 2005
Professor Oak comes to Hoenn to visit Professor Birch, bringing along with him Kanto starters Bulbasaur, Charmander and Squirtle. Team Rocket come to steal them along with Professor Birch's Treecko, Torchic and Mudkip.
348	345	32	"The Bicker the Better" (Tag Battle! Satoshi vs. Haruka!?); Transliteration: "Taggu Batoru! Satoshi Tai Haruka!?" (Japanese: タッグバトル！サトシVSハルカ！？)	April 15, 2004	June 11, 2005
Quarreling Ash and May are mistaken for a couple by "love specialists" Oscar and Andi, who challenge them to a tag team Pokémon battle.
349	346	33	"Grass Hysteria!" (King of the Forbidden Forest! Fushigibana!!); Transliteration: "Kindan no Mori no Ōja! Fushigibana!!" (Japanese: 禁断の森の王者！フシギバナ！！)	April 22, 2004	June 18, 2005
May finds herself in a forest inhabited by grass Pokémon which is forbidden to humans. May befriends a female Bulbasaur who she catches.
350	347	34	"Hokey PokéBalls" (Fushigidane and Fushigidane! Regaining the Monster Balls!!); Transliteration: "Fushigidane to Fushigidane! Monsutā Bōru o Torikaese!!" (Japanese: フシギダネとフシギダネ！モンスターボールを取り返せ！！)	April 29, 2004	June 25, 2005
Ash brings back his Bulbasaur for a visit, and it becomes friendly with May's Bulbasaur. However playtime is cut short as they chase down Team Rocket, who have managed to hijack the Pokémon Center's Pokémon Transfer System and steal a horde of Pokémon.
351	348	35	"Whiscash and Ash" (Showdown! The Fishing Master and the Giant Namazun!!); Transliteration: "Taiketsu! Kyodai Namazun to Tsuri Meijin!!" (Japanese: 対決！巨大ナマズンと釣り名人！！)	May 6, 2004	July 9, 2005
After losing his badge case and the badges in it to a large Whiscash nicknamed Nero, Ash relies on the help of a fisherman called Sullivan who wants to catch Nero.
352	349	36	"Me, Myself and Time" (Yajilon and the Ruins in the Mist!); Transliteration: "Yajiron to Kiri no Naka no Iseki!" (Japanese: ヤジロンと霧の中の遺跡！)	May 13, 2004	July 16, 2005
While separated from the others, Ash encounters a girl called Calista and her Baltoy. He learns Calista and Baltoy were called to meet someone at a set of ruins, and Baltoy is a key.
353	350	37	"A Fan with a Plan" (Formidable Enemy!? Mother Coordinator Appears!); Transliteration: "Kyoōteki!? Mama-san Kōdeinētā Tōjō!" (Japanese: 強敵！？ママさんコーディネーター登場！)	May 20, 2004	July 23, 2005
In a Pokémon contest, May discovers that one of the coordinators named Savannah is actually an adult and a mother!
354	351	38	"Cruisin' for a Losin'" (Pokémon Contest! Ruibosu Tournament!!); Transliteration: "Pokemon Kontesuto! Ruibosu Taikai!!" (Japanese: ポケモンコンテスト！ルイボス大会！！)	May 27, 2004	July 30, 2005
May's Bulbasaur loses when battling Savannah's Lairon. After that, Drew beats Savannah and earns the contest ribbon.
355	352	39	"Pearls are a Spoink's Best Friend" (Baneboo's Lost Object!?); Transliteration: "Banebū no Sagashimono!?" (Japanese: バネブーのさがしもの！？)	June 3, 2004	August 6, 2005
A Spoink needs Ash and his friends to help find its pearl. However, after a scuffle with Team Rocket, it ends up in the hands of the Magikarp Salesman.
356	353	40	"That's Just Swellow" (Beginning Challenge! Sky Match – PokéRinger!!); Transliteration: "Hatsu Chōsen! Kūchū Kyōgi, Pokeringa!!" (Japanese: 初挑戦！空中競技・ポケリンガ！！)	June 10, 2004	August 13, 2005
During an aerial competition, Ash's Taillow evolves into a Swellow when he goes up against Team Rocket's James - who's using Jessie's Dustox.
357	354	41	"Take This House and Shuppet" (The Mansion of Kagebouzu!); Transliteration: "Kagebōzu no Kan!" (Japanese: カゲボウズの館！)	June 17, 2004	August 20, 2005
To protect themselves from the rain, the gang takes shelter in an old mansion. After an argument with May, Max runs off and befriends a Shuppet, using its psychic abilities to play pranks on the others.
358	355	42	"A Shroomish Skirmish" (The Fighting King of the Forest!? Wakasyamo vs. Kinogassa!); Transliteration: "Mori no Kakutō Ō!? Wakashamo Tai Kinogassa!" (Japanese: 森の格闘王！？ワカシャモVSキノガッサ！)	June 24, 2004	August 27, 2005
May's Torchic finally evolves into a Combusken after Ash's Corphish is beaten by an angry and aggressive Breloom that can use Mach Punch.
359	356	43	"Unfair-Weather Friends" (Powalen of the Weather Research Institute!); Transliteration: "Otenki Kenkyūsho no Powarun!" (Japanese: お天気研究所のポワルン！)	July 1, 2004	September 3, 2005
Ash and his friends stumble upon a weather institute which uses a Castform to predict the weather. However, Team Aqua takes the facility hostage while they search for data on the ancient Pokémon, Kyogre and Groudon.
360	357	44	"Who's Flying Now?" (Hiwamaki City's Feather Carnival!!); Transliteration: "Hiwamaki Shiti no Fezā Kānibaru!!" (Japanese: ヒワマキシティのフェザーカーニバル！！)	July 8, 2004	September 10, 2005
Finally reaching Fortree City, the gang discover a carnival full of flying Pokémon, and James befriends and catches a Chimecho.
361	358	45	"Sky High Gym Battle!" (Hiwamaki Gym! Battle in the Sky!!); Transliteration: "Hiwamaki Jimu! Ōzora no Tatakai!!" (Japanese: ヒワマキジム！大空の戦い！！)	July 15, 2004	September 17, 2005
Ash battles Winona at the Fortree City Gym to win a Feather Badge.
362	359	46	"Lights, Camerupt, Action!" (The Film's Riding on Bakuuda!!); Transliteration: "Eiga wa Bakūda ni Notte!!" (Japanese: 映画はバクーダに乗って！！)	July 22, 2004	September 24, 2005
Ash and his friends help a trainer called Elijah and his Camerupt deliver a film to some children.
363	360	47	"Crazy as a Lunatone" (Mystery! A Pokémon from Space!?); Transliteration: "Shinpi! Uchū kara Kita Pokemon!?" (Japanese: 神秘！宇宙から来たポケモン！？)	July 29, 2004	October 1, 2005
A Lunatone crash lands in Hoenn and needs to get back to space. However, the Pokémon Mystery Club returns to snatch Lunatone as proof of a Pokémon lifeform from outer space.
364	361	48	"The Garden of Eatin'" (Kabigon of the Banana Namakero Park!!); Transliteration: "Banana Namakero en no Kabigon!!" (Japanese: バナナナマケロ園のカビゴン！！)	August 5, 2004	October 8, 2005
A Snorlax is eating the bananas in a Slakoth reserve, so one of the Slakoth evolves into Vigoroth whose Vital Spirit ability makes it immune to Snolax's Yawn attack.
365	362	49	"A Scare to Remember" (Pikachu, Joining Team Rocket!?); Transliteration: "Pikachū, Roketto-dan ni Iru!?" (Japanese: ピカチュウ、ロケット団に入る！？)	August 12, 2004	October 15, 2005
Pikachu gets amnesia and is convinced by Meowth that he is a member of Team Rocket and attacks Ash and his friends.
366	363	50	"Pokéblock, Stock, and Berry" (Arrival in Minamo City! Polocks and Swallow's Return!); Transliteration: "Minamo Shiti Tōchaku! Porokku to Tsubamegaeshi!" (Japanese: ミナモシティ到着！ポロックとつばめがえし！)	August 19, 2004	October 22, 2005
While May befriends Kelly, a daughter of a Pokéblock expert, Ash decides to teach Swellow Aerial Ace with the help of a Move Tutor.
367	364	51	"Lessons in Lilycove" (Pokémon Contest! Minamo Tournament!!); Transliteration: "Pokemon Kontesuto! Minamo Taikai!!" (Japanese: ポケモンコンテスト！ミナモ大会！！)	August 26, 2004	October 29, 2005
May and Kelly participate in the Lilycove Pokémon Contest, while Ash helps Swellow master Aerial Ace.
368	365	52	"Judgment Day!" (Those Three Appear! The Referee School Island!); Transliteration: "Ano Sanbiki Tōjō! Shinpan Gakkō no Shima!" (Japanese: あの三匹登場！審判学校の島！)	September 2, 2004	October 29, 2005
Team Rocket attempts to capture an Ivysaur, Charmeleon, and Wartortle belonging to a train Pokémon battle judge called Jimmy.

== Music ==
The Japanese opening songs are "Advance Adventure" (アドバンスアドベンチャー, Adobansu Adobenchā) by GARDEN for 30 episodes, and "Challenger!!" (チャレンジャー！！, Charenjā!!) by Rica Matsumoto for 22 episodes. The ending songs are "Polka O Dolka" (ポルカ・オ・ドルカ, Poruka O Doruka) by Inuko Inuyama and Nolsol Chorus Group for 4 episodes, Toshiko Ezaki performed "Because the Sky is There" (そこに空があるから, Soko ni Sora ga Aru Kara) for 7 episodes, and "Smile" (スマイル, Sumairu) for 42 episodes, "Full of Summer!!" (いっぱいスーマ!!, Ippai Sumā!!) by Naomi Tamura and Himawari Chorus for 8 episodes, "Smile" (スマイル, Sumairu) by Toshiko Ezaki for 1 episode, and the English opening song is "This Dream" by David Rolfe. A shortened version is used as the end credit song.

== Home media ==
In the United States, the series was released on 10 DVD volumes by Viz Media between 2005 and 2006.

Viz Media and Warner Home Video later released Pokémon: Advanced Challenge – The Complete Collection on DVD on December 5, 2017.
