= Pokémon: Diamond and Pearl: Galactic Battles =

Twelfth season of the Pokémon animated television series

- Season 12
- The English title screen from the high-definition episodes of Pokémon: Diamond and Pearl: Galactic Battles season
- No. of episodes: 53 (Japanese version); 52 (English version)

Release
- Original network: TV Tokyo
- Original release: December 4, 2008 – December 24, 2009

Season chronology
- ← Previous; DP: Battle Dimension Next → DP: Sinnoh; League Victors

Pokémon: Diamond and Pearl: Galactic Battles (Note: advertised simply as Pokémon: DP Galactic Battles) is the twelfth season of the Pokémon anime series and the third season of Pokémon the Series: Diamond and Pearl, known in Japan as Pocket Monsters Diamond & Pearl (ポケットモンスター ダイヤモンド&パール, Poketto Monsutā Daiyamondo & Pāru). It originally aired in Japan from December 4, 2008, to December 24, 2009, on TV Tokyo, and in the United States from May 9, 2009, to May 15, 2010, on Cartoon Network.

The season follows Ash Ketchum as he continues travelling across the Sinnoh region with Brock and Dawn.

== Episode list ==
Jap. overall	Eng. overall	No. in season	English title Japanese title	Original release date	English air date
573	568	1	"Get Your Rotom Running!" (Yōkan and Rotom!); Transliteration: "Yōkan to Rotomu!" (Japanese: 羊羹とロトム！)	December 4, 2008	May 9, 2009
Professor Oak recommends to Ash and his friends to visit a place in Canalave City called the Old Chateau, which serves a unique dessert called Old Gateau. However, a Rotom living inside a mansion begins to cause quite a lot of mischief for them.: Note: This episode aired when Pokémon Platinum was released for the Nintendo DS.
574	569	2	"A Breed Stampede!" (The Way to Befriend Pokémon!?); Transliteration: "Pokémon to Nakayokunaru Hōhō!?" (Japanese: ポケモンと仲良くなる方法！？)	December 11, 2008	May 16, 2009
After hearing about Kenny and Nando's latest contest victories, Dawn decides to train Piloswine for a contest, but it begins to disobey her orders - only wanting to eat and sleep. A battle with Team Rocket causes it to evolve into Mamoswine, but is still in total dis-control.
575	570	3	"Ancient Family Matters!" (Rampardos vs. Torideps!!); Transliteration: "Ramuparudosu Tai Toridepusu!!" (Japanese: ラムパルドVSトリデプス！！)	December 18, 2008	May 23, 2009
When Ash reaches into the Canalave Gym once again, he discovers that Byron, the Canalave City Gym Leader, is having a conflict with his son Roark over fossils. A battle between each other and Team Rocket stealing all of Byron's fossils doesn't make it easier.
576	571	4	"Dealing with Defensive Types!" (Mio Gym Battle! Steel Battle!); Transliteration: "Mio Jimu Sen! Hagane no Batoru!!" (Japanese: ミオジム戦！はがねのバトル！！)	December 25, 2008	May 30, 2009
Ash's long-awaited gym battle with Byron goes ahead. However, can Ash battle the way through Byron's defense-oriented battling style and obtain the sixth Sinnoh badge?
577	572	5	"Leading a Stray!" (The Stray Hoeruko!); Transliteration: "Maigo no Hoeruko!" (Japanese: 迷子のホエルコ！)	January 8, 2009	June 6, 2009
Ash must help a trapped Wailmer out of a sewer and back to its Wailord family, with a greedy Luxio out in the brim as well.
578	573	6	"Steeling Peace of Mind!" (Gen and Lucario!); Transliteration: "Gen to Rukario!" (Japanese: ゲンとルカリオ！)	January 15, 2009	June 13, 2009
Ash and friends reach out to Iron Island to see Barry, who's in trouble because steel-type Pokémon on the island, including his own, are turning on their humans. Along the way, they meet a trainer named Riley and his partner, a Lucario. They soon learn that Team Galactic wants to excavate the Iron Ruins with the Spear Key in order to send signals over to Mt. Coronet.
579	574	7	"Saving the World from Ruins!" (Ruins of Steel Island!); Transliteration: "Kōtetsu Shima no Iseki!" (Japanese: 鋼鉄島の遺跡！)	January 22, 2009	June 20, 2009
Ash and Friends stop Team Galactic's plans on Iron Island, however they still have the Spear Key, and Commander Mars is now on the verge of destroying the island with bombs in order to stop her foes.
580	575	8	"Cheers on Castaways Isle!" (The Pikachu-Pochama Drifting Chronicle!); Transliteration: "Pikachū, Pocchama Hyōryūki!" (Japanese: ピカチュウ・ポッチャマ漂流記！)	January 29, 2009	June 27, 2009
A Team Rocket conflict leaves Pikachu and Piplup stranded on an island, here they discover many wild Pokémon setting up rocks near a stone, while Ash is on the verge to save the two. In the end, it's Deoxys that saves the day.
581	576	9	"Hold the Phione!" (Mischievous Phione!); Transliteration: "Itazura Fione!" (Japanese: いたずらフィオネ！)	February 5, 2009	July 4, 2009
When Ash and Friends arrive at Chocovine Town, they're not excited for the contest just yet - but for the Pokémon Phione - who are said to bring good luck. However, Team Rocket takes the heroes off on a Phione-watching tour to take away the Phione for themselves. The Phione escapes to search for Dawn's Bunneary, which it's developed a crush on.
582	577	10	"Another One Gabites the Dust!" (Pokémon Contest! Akebi Tournament!!); Transliteration: "Pokémon Kontesuto! Akebi Taikai!!" (Japanese: ポケモンコンテスト！アケビ大会！！)	February 12, 2009	July 11, 2009
It's the day of the Chocovine Town Contest, where Dawn meets another coordinator named Ursula, a sour girl whose main partner is a Gabite. Pachricisu is already striking a rivalry with it and Dawn is determined to show the arrogant coordinator what she is capable of.
583	578	11	"Stealing the Conversation!" (Wild Junsar and Partner Perap!); Transliteration: "Wairudo Junsā to Aibō Perappu!" (Japanese: ワイルドジュンサーと相棒ペラップ！)	February 19, 2009	July 18, 2009
Ash and his friends meet up with a unique Officer Jenny from Kanto who is teamed up with a Chatot, and is on the lookout for Team Rocket, asking Ash to join her. However, when Team Rocket kidnaps Chatot in a large bowling pin robot, Officer Jenny showcases her skills to save it.
584	579	12	"The Drifting Snorunt!" (Yukimenoko in a Snowstorm!); Transliteration: "Fubuki no Naka no Yukimenoko!" (Japanese: 吹雪の中のユキメノコ！)	February 26, 2009	July 25, 2009
A Froslass begins freezing everything in its sight because it distrusts humans. After learning that a Pokémon Poacher is after a Snorunt, it's up to Ash, his friends, and even Team Rocket to help the Froslass by saving Snorunt.
585	580	13	"Noodles! Roamin' Off!" (Rocket-dan Breakup!?); Transliteration: "Roketto-dan Kaisan!?" (Japanese: ロケット団解散！？)	March 5, 2009	August 1, 2009
Another failed attempt to capture Ash's Pikachu sends Team Rocket blasting off and finding themselves at a Ramen shop. After learning that the owner was a former underclassman in Team Rocket and tells the trio that his dream wasn't always with Team Rocket. After failing to capture Pikachu again, James blames their failure on Meowth, which causes him to quit and work at the Ramen shop; Jessie also decides to quit Team Rocket to become a full-time Pokémon coordinator, leaving James all alone. James then overhears Ash and his friends talking about a shiny Metagross on a nearby mountain and resolves to catch it, not knowing that this particular Metagross is very aggressive.
586	581	14	"Pursuing a Lofty Goal!" (PokéRinger! Big Decisive Battle of Sky!!); Transliteration: "Pokéringa! Tenkū Daikessen!!" (Japanese: ポケリンガ！天空大決戦！！)	March 12, 2009	August 8, 2009
Ash enters his Staravia into a PokéRinger competition in Wind Town, and he's pitted against Paul's Honchkrow in the finals. Honchkrow is gaining the upper hand, but what can Staravia do? In the end, Staravia evolves into Staraptor and wins the competition.
587	582	15	"Trials and Adulations!" (Clash! Mammoo vs. Bossgodora!!); Transliteration: "Gekitotsu! Manmū Tai Bosugodora!!" (Japanese: 激突！マンムーVSボスゴドラ！！)	March 26, 2009	August 15, 2009
While trying to train the still disobedient Mamoswine in a contest, it gets injured in a battle with a stray Aggron. Dawn must use her medical skills to heal Mamoswine, but will it respect and obey Dawn again?
588	—	16	Mysterious Creatures, Pokémon! Transliteration: "Fushigi na Ikimono Poketto Monsutā!" (Japanese: ふしぎないきものポケットモンスター！)	March 26, 2009	N/A
A recap of the Diamond & Pearl series, including previews of future events such as Ash's Snowpoint Gym Battle, the Sandalstraw Town Contest, Brandon's return and Brandon's battle against Paul and his new Hariyama, and the appearance of Regigigas.: Note: This episode was never aired outside of Japan, and was also the last episode to be presented in standard-definition in Japan.
589	583	17	"The Lonely Snover!" (The Lonely Yukikaburi!); Transliteration: "Sabishigariya no Yukikaburi!" (Japanese: さびしがりやのユキカブリ！)	April 2, 2009	August 22, 2009
Ash and friends find themselves with a playful wild Snover, who just wants to be with someone. But when Team Rocket captures it - and Ash's Grotle, Grotle must find a way to escape.: Note: Starting with this episode, the Pokémon anime is now produced in high definition widescreen.
590	584	18	"Stopped in the Name of Love!" (Evolution! This Time for Pochama!?); Transliteration: "Shinka! Sono Toki Pocchama wa!?" (Japanese: 進化！その時ポッチャマは！？)	April 2, 2009	August 29, 2009
Dawn's Piplup tries to evolve, but he doesn't want to - using Bide to stop the evolution, but with the result of him collapsing. Dawn doesn't understand why Piplup doesn't want to evolve, and it's not until a failed Team Rocket plot to capture him, as well as Kenny's Prinplup, and Barry's Empoleon that Dawn begins to understand.
591	585	19	"Old Rivals, New Tricks!" (Pokémon Contest! Tatsunami Tournament!!); Transliteration: "Pokémon Kontesuto! Tatsunami Taikai!!" (Japanese: ポケモンコンテスト！タツナミ大会！！)	April 16, 2009	September 5, 2009
It's the Sandalstraw Contest, and Dawn is pitted against Kenny and Jessie for her fifth ribbon. Dawn uses Ambipom in the finals against Kenny, and amongst facing a stronger opponent than before, Ambipom begins to discover an interest in Pokémon Ping Pong along the way.
592	586	20	"To Thine Own Pokémon Be True!" (Pokémon Ping-Pong Competition! Do Your Best, Eteboth!!); Transliteration: "Pokémon Pinpon Taikai! Etebōsu Ganbaru!!" (Japanese: ポケモンピンポン大会！エテボースがんばる！！)	April 23, 2009	September 12, 2009
Dawn, Barry and Ash enter the Pokémon Ping Pong Tournament. While Ambipom ends up enjoying playing the sport, he ends up losing and getting injured by O and the two-year champion Shiftry. Now Ambipom must wonder if she wants to stay with Dawn to continue on with contests or go with O to train further in Ping Pong. Ultimately, Ambipom chooses Ping Pong and Dawn lets it go.
593	587	21	"Battling a Cute Drama!" (Cherinbo! Brave Battle!?); Transliteration: "Cherinbo! Kenage na Batoru!?" (Japanese: チェリンボ！けなげなバトル！？)	April 30, 2009	September 26, 2009
Ash and friends meet a slightly unusual girl named Marilyn, who deems herself to love "cute" Pokémon. She challenges Dawn to a battle, who is angry with Marilyn after she insulted her Piplup.: Note: This is the last episode of the English dub to be presented in standard-definition.
594	588	22	"Classroom Training!" (Miss Suzuna of the Trainers' School!); Transliteration: "Torēnāzu Sukūru no Suzuna-sensei!" (Japanese: トレーナーズスクールのスズナ先生！)	May 7, 2009	October 3, 2009
Ash and friends have reached Snowpoint City, Zoey's hometown; and meet Candice, the Gym Leader. They explore the Trainer's School where she works.: Note: From this episode onwards, episodes of the English dub are presented in high-definition and widescreen.
595	589	23	"Sliding Into Seventh!" (Kissaki Gym! Ice Battle!!); Transliteration: "Kissaki Jimu! Kōri no Batoru!!" (Japanese: キッサキジム！氷のバトル！！)	May 14, 2009	October 10, 2009
Ash battles Candice for the Icicle Badge, using the training and strategies he recalls.
596	590	24	"A Pyramiding Rage!" (Battle Pyramid! Shinji vs. Jindai!!); Transliteration: "Batoru Piramiddo! Shinji Tai Jindai!!" (Japanese: バトルピラミッド！シンジVSジンダイ！！)	May 21, 2009	October 17, 2009
When Paul discovers that Ash has beaten the Pyramid King Brandon and his brother Reggie couldn't beat him, he decides to take on Brandon in a Full Battle. However, Paul's emotions and anger get the better of him as his Pokémon prove no match against the three Regis. Afterwards, Reggie suggests that Ash and Paul have a full battle in ten days.
597	591	25	"Pillars of Friendship!" (Resurrected Regigigas! J Returns!!); Transliteration: "Fukkatsu no Rejigigasu! Jē Futatabi!!" (Japanese: 復活のレジギガス！J再び！！)	May 28, 2009	October 24, 2009
Hunter J is back once again with a new target: Infiltrate the Snowpoint Temple to capture Regigigas, and she's not letting anyone stand in her way.
598	592	26	"Frozen on Their Tracks!" (Denryuu Train! Handsome Appears!!); Transliteration: "Denryū Ressha! Hansamu Tōjō!!" (Japanese: デンリュウ列車！ハンサム登場！！)	June 4, 2009	October 31, 2009
Ash and friends, and Team Rocket meet Looker on a train. They all discover how the train is controlled through Ampharos and the relation between its owners.
599	593	27	"Pedal to the Mettle!" (Full Battle! Shinji vs. Satoshi!! [Part 1]); Transliteration: "Furu Batoru! Shinji Tai Satoshi!! (Zenpen)" (Japanese: フルバトル！シンジVSサトシ！！（前編）)	June 11, 2009	November 7, 2009
Ash and Paul begin their six-on-six Full Battle against each other. Brock, Dawn and Reggie begin to wonder if Ash may be way out of his depth.
600	594	28	"Evolving Strategies!" (Full Battle! Shinji vs. Satoshi!! [Part 2]); Transliteration: "Furu Batoru! Shinji Tai Satoshi!! -Kōhen-" (Japanese: フルバトル！シンジVSサトシ！！（後編）)	June 18, 2009	November 14, 2009
The battle between Ash and Paul continues, but due to Paul's strategies, Ash is down to his last Pokémon: Chimchar, which may not be enough for the young hero. Will Ash's dreams of becoming a Pokémon Master come to an end? Chimchar evolves into Monferno, but still loses.
601	595	29	"Uncrushing Defeat!" (The Shadow of Uxie!); Transliteration: "Yukushī no Kage!" (Japanese: ユクシーの影！)	June 25, 2009	November 21, 2009
Following his tragic defeat to Paul and having his Pokémon badly injured, Ash is depressed about his loss and wonders to himself about what to do. Meanwhile, Dawn decides to cheer up Ash with a mini Pokémon Circus, Brock discovers the shadow of Uxie, while Team Rocket members plots to capture Pikachu and take advantage of Ash's depression.
602	596	30	"Promoting Healthy Tangrowth!" (King of the Forest! Mojumbo!!); Transliteration: "Mori no Ōja! Mojanbo!!" (Japanese: 森の王者！モジャンボ！！)	July 2, 2009	December 5, 2009
Mamoswine is still proving to be a bit of trouble, and after running away when Pikachu and Piplup laugh at it, it finds itself with a Tangrowth who drains his power. What exactly is the Tangrowth doing?
603	597	31	"Beating the Bustle and Hustle!" (Everybody Participate! Pokémon Hustle!); Transliteration: "Zen'in Sansen! Pokémon Hassuru!" (Japanese: 全員参戦！ポケモンハッスル！)	July 9, 2009	December 12, 2009
Dawn discovers that her favorite television program, the Sinnoh Pokémon Hustle, is in the town they're staying at. Ash and Brock decide to take part as well, but nobody is aware that this respective event is just a scheme set up by Team Rocket to capture Pokémon and hire a new member. Even worse, two thieves are taking part, too.
604	598	32	"Gateway to Ruin!" (Mt. Tengan Ruins! Conspiracy of Ginga-dan!!); Transliteration: "Tenganzan no Iseki! Ginga-dan no Inbō!!" (Japanese: テンガン山の遺跡！ギンガ団の陰謀！！)	July 23, 2009	December 19, 2009
Ash and friends cross Mt. Coronet on their way to Lilypad Town. However, they soon find themselves in another Team Galactic plot.
605	599	33	"Three Sides to Every Story!" (Marill, Pochama & Elekid!!); Transliteration: "Mariru, Pocchama, Erekiddo!!" (Japanese: マリル・ポッチャマ・エレキッド！！)	August 6, 2009	December 26, 2009
A love triangle is born when both Dawn's Piplup and an Elekid fall for a Marill owned by a trainer named Lulu.
606	600	34	"Strategy Begins at Home!" (Hikari vs. Mama! Parent-Child Showdown!!); Transliteration: "Hikari Tai Mama! Oyako Taiketsu!!" (Japanese: ヒカリVSママ！親子対決！！)	August 13, 2009	January 2, 2010
After finding out Dawn's mother Johanna is the chairperson for the Twinleaf Festival, Ash and Friends visit Twinleaf Town and decide to stay for the festival. Within the meantime, Dawn challenges Johanna to a contest battle. Will Dawn be able to best her mom?
607	601	35	"A Faux Oak Finish!" (Rescue Dr. Ohkido! Nyorotono vs. Gureggru!!); Transliteration: "Ōkido-hakase o Kyūshutsu se yo! Nyorotono Tai Guregguru!!" (Japanese: オーキド博士を救出せよ！ニョロトノVSグレッグル！！)	August 20, 2009	January 9, 2010
The Twinleaf Festival has begun, and what better way than a lecture from Professor Oak? However, he doesn't seem familiar, being a scheme by Team Rocket to steal Poké Balls. Meanwhile, the real Professor Oak gets captured by a Politoed and some Quagsire, and Ash and friends must find where he is.
608	602	36	"Historical Mystery Tour!" (Naty, Natio...Mysterious Forest!); Transliteration: "Neiti, Neitio... Fushigi na Mori!" (Japanese: ネイティ、ネイティオ…不思議な森！)	August 27, 2009	January 16, 2010
Barry returns for the Twinleaf Festival, and challenges Ash to a battle. However, he soon finds himself, alongside Ash and Dawn, in a mysterious forest containing a mysterious tent. Within no time, the three trainers find themselves in an illusion - refacing the predicaments that they each faced at the beginning of their journeys.
609	603	37	"Challenging a Towering Figure" (Tower Tycoon! That Man, Kurotsugu!!); Transliteration: "Tawā Taikūn! Sono Otoko, Kurotsugu!!" (Japanese: タワータイクーン！その男、クロツグ！！)	September 3, 2009	January 23, 2010
Ash, Barry, and Brock enter the Twinleaf Festival's main event, a battle tournament. The winner is offered a chance to battle Barry's own father, none other than Palmer of the Sinnoh Battle Frontier.
610	604	38	"Where No Togepi Has Gone Before!" (The Worst Togepi in History!); Transliteration: "Shijō Saiaku no Togepī!" (Japanese: 史上最悪のトゲピー！)	September 10, 2009	January 30, 2010
Using the money they gained from the Twinleaf Festival, Team Rocket builds a secret base and captures Ash and his friends. However, things start proving trouble when a naughty female Togepi starts causing several tricks which ends up with everyone reaching space!
611	605	39	"An Egg Scramble!" (Johto Festival! Chikorita and Waninoko Appear!!); Transliteration: "Jōhto Fesuta! Chikorīta to Waninoko Tōjō!!" (Japanese: ジョウトフェスタ！チコリータとワニノコ登場！！)	September 17, 2009	February 6, 2010
While they are traveling, Ash and friends discover a Johto Festival in a town, and meet Lyra and Khoury, a trainer and breeder from the Johto region. After Dawn defeats Lyra in a battle and wins a Pokémon Egg, the two decide to adventure with Ash and his friends while Khoury's father holds the festival.
612	606	40	"Gone With the Windworks!" (Dungeon Capture!? The Valley Powerplant!); Transliteration: "Danjon Kōryaku!? Tanima no Hatsudensho!" (Japanese: ダンジョン攻略！？谷間の発電所！)	September 17, 2009	February 13, 2010
Following Dawn's Egg hatching into a Cyndaquil, Ash has a practice battle with her. However, Lyra loses her Marill again and everyone soon finds themselves in the Valley Windworks. Meanwhile, Team Rocket is up to no good again as always.
613	607	41	"A Rivalry to Gible On!" (Fukamaru... I'll get you!); Transliteration: "Fukamaru... Getto da ze!" (Japanese: フカマル…ゲットだぜ！)	October 1, 2009	February 20, 2010
Ash and Khoury compete for a wild Gible, who likes to play tricks on everyone.
614	608	42	"Dressed for Jess Success!" (Pokémon Contest! Suiren Tournament!!); Transliteration: "Pokémon Kontesuto! Suiren Taikai!!" (Japanese: ポケモンコンテスト！スイレン大会！！)	October 1, 2009	February 27, 2010
It's the day of the Lilypad Town Contest, but Jessie gets sick and asks James to take her place as Jessalina. In the semi-finals, Dawn is pitted against "Jessalina", but Mamoswine soon starts to lose self-control.
615	609	43	"Bagged Then Tagged!" (Satoshi to Hikari! Tag Battle!!); Transliteration: "Satoshi to Hikari! Taggu Batoru!!" (Japanese: サトシとヒカリ！タッグバトル！！)	October 15, 2009	March 6, 2010
On the last day of the Johto Festival, Lyra and Khoury have a Tag Battle against Ash and Dawn. As they prepare to leave, Khoury's father gives Brock a Pokégear.
616	610	44	"Try for the Family Stone!" (Muma, Yamikarasu and the Dark Stone!); Transliteration: "Mūma to Yamikarasu to Yami no Ishi!" (Japanese: ムウマとヤミカラスとやみのいし！)	October 22, 2009	March 13, 2010
A young boy with a Murkrow and a young girl with a Misdreavus compete for a Dusk Stone to evolve their respective Pokémon into either Honchkrow or Mismagius.
617	611	45	"Sticking with Who You Know!" (Pikachu and Pochama, Keep Apart!!); Transliteration: "Pikachū Pocchama Kuttsukanai de!!" (Japanese: ピカチュウポッチャマくっつかないで！！)	October 29, 2009	March 20, 2010
A Pokémon scientist's "love machine" which creates friendships between his water and electric Pokémon ends up backfiring when not only his Pokémon - but Pikachu and Piplup as well, get connected together.
618	612	46	"Unlocking the Red Chain of Events!" (The Red Chain! Activated by the Ginga-dan!!); Transliteration: "Akai Kusari! Ginga-dan Shidō!!" (Japanese: 赤い鎖！ギンガ団始動！！)	November 5, 2009	March 27, 2010
When Ash and friends discover an unconscious Meowth, he tells them about Team Galactic and what's going on. Now, Ash and friends find themselves in Team Galactic's ultimate goal to capture the Legendary Pokémon of Time and Space, Dialga and Palkia using the red chain in order to create a new world.
619	613	47	"The Needs of the Three!" (Agnome, Uxie & Emrit!); Transliteration: "Agunomu, Yukushī, Emuritto!" (Japanese: アグノム・ユクシー・エムリット！)	November 12, 2009	April 3, 2010
Team Galactic requests the help of Hunter J to capture the Lake Trio. However, her overconfidence ends up causing her demise when Mesperit and Uxie use Future Sight before their kidnapping and bring an end to the evil Pokémon Hunter for good. Meanwhile, Ash and friends discover that the "businessman" they previously met was Cyrus - Team Galactic's boss, and now wants to create a new world.
620	614	48	"The Battle Finale of Legend!" (Dialga and Palkia! The Final Battle!!); Transliteration: "Diaruga to Parukia! Saigo no Tatakai!!" (Japanese: ディアルガとパルキア！最後の戦い！！)	November 12, 2009	April 10, 2010
As Team Galactic's plan reaches its final stages, Ash, Brock and Dawn along with the Sinnoh League Champion Cynthia race against time to stop Cyrus from carrying out his plan of creating a new world. Will they succeed or will the Sinnoh region as well as the entire Pokémon world fall victim to Cyrus's mad plans?
621	615	49	"The Treasure Is All Mine!" (Full of Danger! Kojirō's Treasure Chest!!); Transliteration: "Kiken ga Ippai! Kojirō no Takarabako!!" (Japanese: 危険がいっぱい！コジロウの宝箱！！)	November 26, 2009	April 17, 2010
Ash and his friends continue their way to Asatsuki Town for Dawn's next contest when Ash happens to find a treasure chest. However its contents prove surprising to James as he is forced to face his privileged past, his faithful childhood companion, and his ex-fiancée!
622	616	50	"Mastering Current Events!" (The Air Battle Master Appears! Glion vs. Hassam!!); Transliteration: "Ea Batoru Masutā Tōjō! Guraion Tai Hassamu!!" (Japanese: エアバトルマスター登場！グライオンVSハッサム！！)	December 3, 2009	April 24, 2010
While on the way to Sunyshore City, Ash and his friends meet a gentleman who claims to be the master of air battles. Hoping to improve his Gliscor's flying, Ash decides to have a battle with him and his Scizor, and the results may be more than he expected.
623	617	51	"Double-Time Battle Training!" (Double Battle! Mammoo and Hinoarashi!!); Transliteration: "Daburu Batoru! Manmū to Hinoarashi!!" (Japanese: ダブルバトル！マンムーとヒノアラシ！！)	December 10, 2009	May 1, 2010
Ash, Dawn and Brock meet Zoey and Candice after Zoey's contest win. Inspired by the win, Dawn decides to create a new Contest Combination and asks Zoey for a Contest Battle to help her out.
624	618	52	"A Meteoric Rise to Excellence!" (Fukamaru and Draco Meteor!!); Transliteration: "Fukamaru to Ryūseigun!!" (Japanese: フカマルとりゅうせいぐん！！)	December 17, 2009	May 8, 2010
Ash and friends find themselves in a forest, and discover an Altaria using a powerful move named Draco Meteor. Meanwhile, a wild Gible who also lives in the forest wants to learn the move as well, so Ash decides to help it out.
625	619	53	"Gotta Get a Gible!" (Fukamaru! I'll get you!!); Transliteration: "Fukamaru! Getto da ze!!" (Japanese: フカマル！ゲットだぜ！！)	December 24, 2009	May 15, 2010
Ash and friends discover that Gible has been following them. Barry shows up and tries to catch Gible, but it chooses Ash as its trainer. Barry then has a battle with Ash and Gible, but will Gible be in perfect sync with his new trainer?

== Music ==
The Japanese opening songs are "High Touch!" (ハイタッチ！, Hai Tatchi!) for 29 episodes, and "High Touch! 2009" (ハイタッチ！ 2009, Hai Tatchi! 2009) for 24 episodes by Rica Matsumoto and Megumi Toyoguchi. The ending songs are "Surely Tomorrow" (あしたはきっと, Ashita wa Kitto) by Kanako Yoshii for 16 episodes, "Get Fired Up, Spiky-eared Pichu!" (もえよギザみみピチュー！, Moe yo Giza Mimi Pichū!) by Shoko Nakagawa for 24 episodes, "Which One ~ Is It?" (ドッチ〜ニョ？, Dotchi~Nyo?) by MooMoo Milk and Araki-san for 13 episodes, and the English opening song is "Battle Cry - (Stand Up!)" by Erin Bowman. Its instrumental version served as the ending credit song.

== Home media releases ==
Viz Media and Warner Home Video have released the series in the United States in four 2-disc boxsets, or eight individual single-disc volume sets.

The first boxset was released on March 15, 2011, and contains 15 episodes altogether (7 on Disc 1, and 8 on Disc 2). The second was released on May 10, 2011, and contains 12 episodes altogether (6 per disc). The third boxset was released on August 30, 2011, and also contains 12 episodes altogether (6 per disc). The fourth boxset was released on November 22, 2011, and contained 13 episodes altogether (6 on Disc 1, and 7 on Disc 2).

Viz Media and Warner Home Video later released the complete series on a 7-disc DVD boxset on August 18, 2020.
