= Toshiko Ezaki =

Japanese musician

Toshiko Ezaki (江崎 とし子) is a Japanese musician, composer, singer, songwriter, and producer from Kyoto, Japan. While she recently released her 5th CD, Arbol Grande, she is better known for having written and sung songs for Pokémon: Advanced Generation.

Ezaki has composed many songs for well-known Japanese artists, including Kosuke Atari and Misaki Usuzawa, and has sung background vocals for several more. She has also composed music and done vocals on many television and radio commercials, and has created instrumental pieces both internationally and in Japan.

In 2002, Ezaki was put in charge of composing the music and singing the ending theme song for the animated cartoon series Pocket Monsters (or ‘Pokémon’). Her songs included "Because the Sky is There" and "Smile". In 2012, she composed and sang background vocals on Pokémon's ending theme song, "Seven-colored Arch".

In addition to her compositions, Ezaki produces CDs for indie artists on her own label, Moss Green Records, works as a voice trainer and crystal bowl player, and continues to perform live across southern and central Japan. In 2012, Ezaki began composing songs for Misaki, a young and increasingly popular Minyou singer from Tohoku, Japan. Ezaki composed two songs for Misaki's debut album, plus a single, and is in the process of composing additional songs for her.

== Discography ==
- "Apple Tea", Blow Wind Records, 2001.
- "Spices", Moss Green Records, 2004.
- "Musk", a Collaboration album with composer and pianist Ryuji Iuchi, 2005.
- Eight Children, Moss Green Records, 2008.
- Voice Painting, Moss Green Records, 2010.
- Arbol Grande, Moss Green records, 2015.
