= Asuna =

Asuna may refer to:

== People with the given name ==
- Asuna Tanaka (田中 明日菜; born 1988), Japanese football player
- Asuna Tomari, (泊 明日菜) Japanese voice actress

== Fictional characters ==
- Asuna Yuuki, a main character from the light novel and anime series Sword Art Online
- Asuna, also known as Flannery, a character in Pokémon
- Asuna, a character in the television series Kishiryu Sentai Ryusoulger
- Asuna Harukaze, a character from the manga Softenni
- Asuna Ichinose, a character in the role-playing game Blue Archive
- Asuna Kagurazaka, a character in the manga and anime series Negima!
- Asuna Kujo, a character in the manga series Maison Ikkoku
- Asuna Yamase, a character in Ultraman X
- Asuna Karino (Poppy Pipopapo), a character in Kamen Rider Ex-Aid

== Other uses ==
- Asüna, an automotive marque sold in Canada 1992–1993
