= List of Pokémon episodes (seasons 1–9) =

Pokémon, known in Japan as Pocket Monsters (ポケットモンスター, Poketto Monsutā), is a Japanese anime television series produced by animation studio OLM for TV Tokyo. It is adapted from the Pokémon video game series published by Nintendo. The series follows the ten-year-old Pokémon Trainer Ash Ketchum (Note: Ash is voiced in English by Veronica Taylor for the first eight seasons and Sarah Natochenny from season 9 onwards. His voice actor in Japanese is Rica Matsumoto. His voice actors in Korean are Choi Deok-Hui for the first five seasons and first two movies, An Hyeon-Seo from the 3rd movie to the 5th movie and Lee Seon-ho from season 6 onwards.) and his adventures with his Electric-type Pokémon partner Pikachu (voiced by Ikue Ōtani), and a varying group of friends in his quest to become a Pokémon Master.

For the purposes of this list, the division between seasons of Pokémon is based on the season divisions used by VIZ Media for North American home video releases. (Note: This differs slightly from the season divisions used for digital releases of the series, by which episodes 52-53 and 58-82 (by the Japanese episode order) are counted as part of the second season, Adventures in the Orange Islands.) The English episode numbers are based on their first airing either in syndication, on Kids' WB, Cartoon Network, Disney XD or on Netflix. Subsequent episodes of the English version follow the original Japanese order, except where banned episodes are shown.

== Series overview ==
Season	Season name	Episodes	Originally released	
Season	Season name	Episodes	First released	Last released
1	Indigo League	80	April 1, 1997	January 21, 1999
2	Adventures in the Orange Islands	36	January 28, 1999	October 7, 1999
3	The Johto Journeys	41	October 14, 1999	July 27, 2000
4	Johto League Champions	52	August 3, 2000	August 2, 2001
5	Master Quest	64	August 9, 2001	November 14, 2002
6	Advanced	40	November 21, 2002	August 28, 2003
7	Advanced Challenge	52	September 4, 2003	September 2, 2004
8	Advanced Battle	52	September 9, 2004	September 29, 2005
9	Battle Frontier	47	October 6, 2005	September 14, 2006
10	Diamond and Pearl	51	September 28, 2006	October 25, 2007
11	Diamond and Pearl: Battle Dimension	52	November 8, 2007	December 4, 2008
12	Diamond and Pearl: Galactic Battles	52	December 4, 2008	December 24, 2009
13	Diamond and Pearl: Sinnoh League Victors	34	January 7, 2010	September 9, 2010
14	Black & White	48	September 23, 2010	September 15, 2011
15	Black & White: Rival Destinies	49	September 22, 2011	October 4, 2012
16	Black & White: Adventures in Unova and Beyond	45	October 11, 2012	September 26, 2013
17	XY	48	October 17, 2013	October 30, 2014
18	XY: Kalos Quest	45	November 13, 2014	October 22, 2015
19	XYZ	48	October 29, 2015	October 27, 2016
20	Sun & Moon	43	November 17, 2016	September 21, 2017
21	Sun & Moon: Ultra Adventures	48	October 5, 2017	October 14, 2018
22	Sun & Moon: Ultra Legends	54	October 21, 2018	November 3, 2019
23	Journeys	48	November 17, 2019	December 4, 2020
24	Master Journeys	42	December 11, 2020	December 10, 2021
25	Ultimate Journeys	54	December 17, 2021	March 24, 2023
26	Horizons	45	April 14, 2023	March 29, 2024
27	Horizons – The Search for Laqua	44	April 12, 2024	March 21, 2025
28	Horizons – Rising Hope	54	April 11, 2025	TBA

== Episode list ==
=== Season 1: Indigo League (1997–99) ===
Jap. overall	Eng. overall	No. in season	English title Japanese title	Directed by	Written by	Animation directed by	Original release date	English air date
1	1	1	"Pokémon, I Choose You!" (Pokémon! I Choose You!); Transliteration: "Pokémon! Kimi ni Kimeta!" (Japanese: ポケモン! きみにきめた!)	Directed by : Toshiaki Suzuki; Storyboarded by : Kunihiko Yuyama	Takeshi Shudō	Keishi Sakai & Sayuri Ichiishi	April 1, 1997	September 8, 1998
2	2	2	"Pokémon Emergency!" (Showdown! Pokémon Center!); Transliteration: "Taiketsu! Pokémon Sentā!" (Japanese: たいけつ! ポケモンセンター!)	Directed by : Osamu Inoue; Storyboarded by : Toshiaki Suzuki	Takeshi Shudō	Munekatsu Fujita	April 8, 1997	September 9, 1998
3	3	3	"Ash Catches a Pokémon" (Pokémon, I'll Get You!); Transliteration: "Pokémon Getto Da Ze!" (Japanese: ポケモン ゲットだぜ!)	Yūji Asada	Atsuhiro Tomioka	Akihiro Tamagawa	April 15, 1997	September 10, 1998
4	4	4	"Challenge of the Samurai" (Challenge of the Young Boy Samurai!); Transliteration: "Samurai Shōnen no Chōsen!" (Japanese: サムライしょうねんのちょうせん!)	Directed by : Minoru Ōhara; Storyboarded by : Toshiaki Suzuki	Hideki Sonoda	Masayuki Hiraoka	April 22, 1997	September 11, 1998
5	5	5	"Showdown in Pewter City" (Battle of Nibi Gym!); Transliteration: "Nibi Jimu no Tatakai!" (Japanese: ニビジムのたたかい!)	Kiyotaka Itani	Junki Takegami	Norihiro Matsubara	April 29, 1997	September 14, 1998
6	6	6	"Clefairy and the Moon Stone" (Pippi and the Moon Stone); Transliteration: "Pippi to Tsuki no Ishi" (Japanese: ピッピとつきのいし)	Directed by : Yūji Asada; Storyboarded by : Toshiaki Suzuki	Atsuhiro Tomioka	Hidetoshi Otaka	May 6, 1997	September 15, 1998
7	7	7	"The Water Flowers of Cerulean City" (The Underwater Flowers of Hanada City); Transliteration: "Hanada Shiti no Suichūka" (Japanese: ハナダシティのすいちゅうか)	Osamu Inoue	Yukiyoshi Ōhashi	Munekatsu Fujita	May 13, 1997	September 16, 1998
8	8	8	"The Path to the Pokémon League" (The Road to the Pokémon League); Transliteration: "Pokemon Rīgu e no Michi" (Japanese: ポケモンリーグへのみち)	Toshiaki Suzuki	Atsuhiro Tomioka	Takayuki Shimura	May 20, 1997	September 17, 1998
9	9	9	"The School of Hard Knocks" (Pokémon Certain Victory Manual); Transliteration: "Pokemon Hisshō Manyuaru" (Japanese: ポケモンひっしょうマニュアル)	Yūji Asada	Takeshi Shudō	Akihiro Tamagawa	May 27, 1997	September 18, 1998
10	10	10	"Bulbasaur and the Hidden Village" (Fushigidane of the Hidden Village); Transliteration: "Kakurezato no Fushigidane" (Japanese: かくれざとのフシギダネ)	Directed by : Hideki Hiroshima; Storyboarded by : Naori Hiraki	Yukiyoshi Ōhashi	Masayuki Hiraoka	June 3, 1997	September 21, 1998
11	11	11	"Charmander – The Stray Pokémon" (The Stray Pokémon – Hitokage); Transliteration: "Hagure Pokemon, Hitokage" (Japanese: はぐれポケモンヒトカゲ)	Kiyotaka Itani	Junki Takegami	Izumi Shimura	June 10, 1997	September 22, 1998
12	12	12	"Here Comes the Squirtle Squad" (The Zenigame Squad Appears!); Transliteration: "Zenigame-gundan Tōjō!" (Japanese: ゼニガメぐんだんとうじょう!)	Toshiaki Suzuki	Hideki Sonoda	Keishi Sakai	June 17, 1997	September 23, 1998
13	13	13	"Mystery at the Lighthouse" (Masaki's Lighthouse); Transliteration: "Masaki no Tōdai" (Japanese: マサキのとうだい)	Directed by : Hideki Hiroshima; Storyboarded by : Takaaki Ishiyama	Takeshi Shudō	Masayuki Hiraoka	June 24, 1997	September 24, 1998
14	14	14	"Electric Shock Showdown" (Electric Shock Showdown! Kuchiba Gym); Transliteration: "Dengeki Taiketsu! Kuchiba Jimu" (Japanese: でんげきたいけつ! クチバジム)	Masamitsu Hidaka	Atsuhiro Hiraoka	Takayuki Shimura	July 1, 1997	September 25, 1998
15	15	15	"Battle Aboard the St. Anne" (The St. Anne Battle!); Transliteration: "Santo Annu-gō no Tatakai!" (Japanese: サントアンヌごうのたたかい!)	Yūji Asada	Yukiyoshi Ōhashi	Akihiro Tamagawa	July 8, 1997	September 7, 1998 (Note: It aired in the United States as the first dubbed episode on September 7, 1998, and later aired in-sequence on September 28, 1998.); September 28, 1998
16	16	16	"Pokémon Shipwreck" (Pokémon Adrift); Transliteration: "Pokemon Hyōryūki" (Japanese: ポケモンひょうりゅうき)	Osamu Inoue	Junki Takegami	Masumi Etō	July 15, 1997	September 29, 1998
17	17	17	"Island of the Giant Pokémon" (Island of the Gigantic Pokémon!?); Transliteration: "Kyodai Pokemon no Shima!?" (Japanese: きょだいポケモンのしま!?)	Directed by : Yukio Okazaki; Storyboarded by : Masamitsu Hidaka	Takeshi Shudō	Izumi Shimura	July 22, 1997	September 30, 1998
18	18	18	"Beauty and the Beach" (Holiday at Aopulco); Transliteration: "Aopuruko no Kyūjitsu" (Japanese: アオプルコのきゅうじつ)	Toshiaki Suzuki	Hideki Sonoda	Keishi Sakai	July 29, 1997	June 24, 2000
19	19	19	"Tentacool & Tentacruel" (Menokurage, Dokukurage); Transliteration: "Menokurage Dokukurage" (Japanese: メノクラゲドククラゲ)	Directed by : Shigeru Ōmachi; Storyboarded by : Kazu Yokota	Atsuhiro Tomioka	Yūsaku Takeda	August 5, 1997	October 1, 1998
20	20	20	"The Ghost of Maiden's Peak" (Ghost Pokémon and the Summer Festival); Transliteration: "Yūrei Pokemon to Natsumatsuri" (Japanese: ゆうれいポケモンとなつまつり)	Kiyotaka Itani	Takeshi Shudō	Takayuki Shimura	August 12, 1997	October 2, 1998
21	21	21	"Bye Bye Butterfree" (Bye Bye Butterfree); Transliteration: "Bai Bai Batafurī" (Japanese: バイバイバタフリー)	Yūji Asada	Yukiyoshi Ōhashi	Akihiro Tamagawa	August 19, 1997	October 5, 1998
22	22	22	"Abra and the Psychic Showdown (Part 1)" (Casey! Psychic Showdown!); Transliteration: "Kēshii! Chōnōryoku Taiketsu!" (Japanese: ケーシィ! ちょうのうりょくたいけつ!)	Osamu Inoue	Junki Takegami	Keishi Sakai	August 26, 1997	October 6, 1998
23	23	23	"The Tower of Terror (Part 2)" (Got It at the Pokémon Tower!); Transliteration: "Pokemon Tawā de Getto da ze!" (Japanese: ポケモンタワーでゲットだぜ!)	Directed by : Toshiaki Suzuki; Storyboarded by : Yukio Okazaki	Hideki Sonoda	Izumi Shimura	September 2, 1997	October 7, 1998
24	24	24	"Haunter vs. Kadabra (Part 3)" (Ghost vs. Esper!); Transliteration: "Gōsuto Tai Esupā!" (Japanese: ゴーストVSエスパー!)	Directed by : Yoshihiro Oda; Storyboarded by : Toshiaki Suzuki	Junki Takegami	Sato Yamamoto	September 9, 1997	October 8, 1998
25	25	25	"Primeape Goes Bananas" (Don't Get Angry, Okorizaru!); Transliteration: "Okoranai de ne Okorizaru!" (Japanese: おこらないでねオコリザル!)	Directed by : Shigeru Ōmachi; Storyboarded by : Kazu Yokota	Atsuhiro Tomioka	Yūsaku Takeda	September 16, 1997	October 9, 1998
26	26	26	"Pokémon Scent-sation!" (Erika and Kusaihana); Transliteration: "Erika to Kusaihana" (Japanese: エリカとクサイハナ)	Kiyotaka Itani	Hideki Sonoda	Takayuki Shimura	September 23, 1997	October 12, 1998
27	27	27	"Hypno's Naptime" (Sleeper and Pokémon Hypnotism!?); Transliteration: "Surīpā to Pokemon Gaeri!?" (Japanese: スリーパーとポケモンがえり!?)	Directed by : Osamu Inoue; Storyboarded by : Takaaki Ishiyama	Yukiyoshi Ōhashi	Shin'ichirō Kajiura	September 30, 1997	October 13, 1998
28	28	28	"Pokémon Fashion Flash" (Rokon! Breeder Showdown!); Transliteration: "Rokon! Burīdā Taiketsu!" (Japanese: ロコン! ブリーダーたいけつ!)	Yūji Asada	Atsuhiro Tomioka	Akihiro Tamagawa	October 7, 1997	October 14, 1998
29	29	29	"The Punchy Pokémon" (Fighting Pokémon! Huge Battle!); Transliteration: "Kakutō Pokemon! Dai Batoru!" (Japanese: かくとうポケモン! だいバトル!)	Toshiaki Suzuki	Hideki Sonoda	Keishi Sakai	October 14, 1997	October 15, 1998
30	30	30	"Sparks Fly for Magnemite" (Do Coil Dream of Electric Mice!?); Transliteration: "Koiru wa Denki Nezumi no Yume o Miru ka!?" (Japanese: コイルはでんきネズミのユメをみるか!?)	Directed by : Kōji Ogawa; Storyboarded by : Yoshitaka Fujimoto	Junki Takegami	Sato Yamamoto	October 21, 1997	October 16, 1998
31	31	31	"Dig Those Diglett!" (Full of Digda!); Transliteration: "Diguda ga Ippai!" (Japanese: ディグダがいっぱい!)	Directed by : Shigeru Ōmachi; Storyboarded by : Kazu Yokota	Takeshi Shudō	Yūsaku Takeda	October 28, 1997	October 19, 1998
32	32	32	"The Ninja-Poké Showdown" (Sekichiku Ninja Showdown!); Transliteration: "Sekichiku Ninja Taiketsu!" (Japanese: セキチクにんじゃたいけつ!)	Kiyotaka Itani	Yukiyoshi Ōhashi	Takayuki Shimura	November 4, 1997	October 20, 1998
33	33	33	"The Flame Pokémon-athon!" (The Big Fire Pokémon Race!); Transliteration: "Honō no Pokemon Dai Rēsu!" (Japanese: ほのおのポケモンだいレース!)	Yūji Asada	Atsuhiro Tomioka	Akihiro Tamagawa	November 11, 1997	October 21, 1998
34	34	34	"The Kangaskhan Kid" (Garura's Lullaby); Transliteration: "Garūra no Komoriuta" (Japanese: ガルーラのこもりうた)	Osamu Inoue	Junki Takegami	Masayuki Hiraoka	November 18, 1997	October 22, 1998
35	N/A	35	"The Legend of Dratini"; Transliteration: "Miniryū no Densetsu" (Japanese: ミニリュウのでんせつ)	Toshiaki Suzuki	Hideki Sonoda	Izumi Shimura	November 25, 1997	N/A
36	35	36	"The Bridge Bike Gang" (Stormy Cycling Road); Transliteration: "Arashi no Saikuringu Rōdo" (Japanese: あらしのサイクリングロード)	Directed by : Shigeru Ōmachi; Storyboarded by : Kazu Yokota	Yukiyoshi Ōhashi	Yūsaku Takeda	December 2, 1997	October 23, 1998
37	36	37	"Ditto's Mysterious Mansion" (Metamon and the Copycat Girl); Transliteration: "Metamon to Monomane Musume" (Japanese: メタモンとものまねむすめ)	Directed by : Kiyotaka Itani; Storyboarded by : Yoshitaka Fujimoto	Atsuhiro Tomioka	Keishi Sakai	December 9, 1997	October 26, 1998
38	N/A	38	"Electric Soldier Porygon"; Transliteration: "Dennō Senshi Porygon" (Japanese: でんのうせんしポリゴン)	Kiyotaka Itani	Junki Takegami	Takayuki Shimura	December 16, 1997	N/A
39	37	39	"Pikachu's Goodbye" (Forest of Pikachu); Transliteration: "Pikachū no Mori" (Japanese: ピカチュウのもり)	Directed by : Kiyotaka Itani; Storyboarded by : Masamitsu Hidaka	Shinzō Fujita	Keishi Sakai	April 16, 1998 (Note: Aired as a double-length special.)	November 20, 1998
40	38	40	"The Battling Eevee Brothers" (The 4 Eievui Brothers); Transliteration: "Ībui Yon Kyōdai" (Japanese: イーブイ4きょうだい)	Osamu Inoue	Atsuhiro Tomioka	Shin'ichirō Kajiura	April 16, 1998	October 27, 1998
41	39	41	"Wake Up Snorlax!" (Wake Up! Kabigon!); Transliteration: "Okiro! Kabigon!" (Japanese: おきろ! カビゴン!)	Directed by : Kōji Ogawa; Storyboarded by : Toshiaki Suzuki	Yukiyoshi Ōhashi	Izumi Shimura	April 23, 1998	October 28, 1998
42	40	42	"Showdown at Dark City" (Showdown! Pokémon Gym!); Transliteration: "Taiketsu! Pokemon Jimu!" (Japanese: たいけつ! ポケモンジム!)	Directed by : Shigeru Ōmachi; Storyboarded by : Kazu Yokota	Junki Takegami	Yūsaku Takeda	April 30, 1998	October 29, 1998
43	41	43	"The March of the Exeggutor Squad" (The Huge March of the Nassy Squad!); Transliteration: "Nasshī Gundan Daikōshin!" (Japanese: ナッシーぐんだんだいこうしん!)	Kiyotaka Itani	Hideki Sonoda	Sato Yamamoto	May 7, 1998	October 30, 1998
44	42	44	"The Problem with Paras" (Paras and Parasect); Transliteration: "Parasu to Parasekuto" (Japanese: パラスとパラセクト)	Directed by : Toshiaki Suzuki; Storyboarded by : Yoshitaka Fujimoto	Atsuhiro Tomioka	Keishi Sakai	May 14, 1998	February 13, 1999
45	43	45	"The Song of Jigglypuff" (Sing! Purin!); Transliteration: "Utatte! Purin!" (Japanese: うたって! プリン!)	Yūji Asada	Yukiyoshi Ōhashi	Akihiro Tamagawa	May 21, 1998	February 20, 1999
46	44	46	"Attack of the Prehistoric Pokémon" (Resurrected!? Fossil Pokémon!); Transliteration: "Fukkatsu!? Kaseki Pokemon!" (Japanese: ふっかつ!? かせきポケモン!)	Osamu Inoue	Junki Takegami	Shin'ichirō Kajiura	May 28, 1998	February 27, 1999
47	45	47	"A Chansey Operation" (Lucky's Clinical Records); Transliteration: "Rakkī no Karute" (Japanese: ラッキーのカルテ)	Toshiaki Suzuki	Hideki Sonoda	Junko Isaka	June 4, 1998	March 6, 1999
48	46	48	"Holy Matrimony!" (Gardie and Kojirou); Transliteration: "Gādi to Kojirō" (Japanese: ガーディとコジロウ)	Directed by : Kōji Ogawa; Storyboarded by : Masamitsu Hidaka	Junki Takegami	Izumi Shimura	June 11, 1998	March 13, 1999
49	47	49	"So Near, Yet So Farfetch'd" (Kamonegi's Easy Mark); Transliteration: "Kamonegi no Kamo" (Japanese: カモネギのカモ)	Osamu Inoue	Atsuhiro Tomioka	Shin'ichirō Kajiura	June 18, 1998	March 20, 1999
50	48	50	"Who Gets to Keep Togepi?" (Whose Is Togepy!?); Transliteration: "Togepī wa Dare no Mono!?" (Japanese: トゲピーはだれのもの!?)	Kiyotaka Itani	Hideki Sonoda	Keishi Sakai	June 25, 1998	March 27, 1999
51	49	51	"Bulbasaur's Mysterious Garden" (Fushigidane's Mysterious Flower Garden); Transliteration: "Fushigidane no Fushigi na Hanazono" (Japanese: フシギダネのふしぎのはなぞの)	Yūji Asada	Atsuhiro Tomioka	Akihiro Tamagawa	July 2, 1998	April 3, 1999
52	50	52	"Princess vs. Princess" (Fierce Fighting! Pokémon Girls' Festival); Transliteration: "Gekitō! Pokemon Hinamatsuri" (Japanese: げきとう! ポケモンひなまつり)	Directed by : Shigeru Ōmachi; Storyboarded by : Kazu Yokota	Junki Takegami	Yūsaku Takeda	July 9, 1998 (Note: Aired as a double-length special.)	September 4, 1999
53	51	53	"The Purr-fect Hero" (It's Children's Day! Everyone Come Together!); Transliteration: "Kodomo no Hi da yo! Zen'in Shūgō!" (Japanese: こどものひだよ! ぜんいんしゅうごう!)	Directed by : Kōji Ogawa; Storyboarded by : Toshiaki Suzuki	Yukiyoshi Ōhashi	Sato Yamamoto	July 9, 1998	September 11, 1999
54	52	54	"The Case of the K-9 Caper!" (Gardie the Police Dog); Transliteration: "Keisatsuken Gādi" (Japanese: けいさつけんガーディ)	Toshiaki Suzuki	Junki Takegami	Junko Isaka	July 16, 1998	April 10, 1999
55	53	55	"Pokémon Paparazzi" (Shutter Chance Pikachu); Transliteration: "Shattā Chansu wa Pikachū" (Japanese: シャッターチャンスはピカチュウ)	Directed by : Shigeru Ōmachi; Storyboarded by : Kazu Yokota	Hideki Sonoda	Yūsaku Takeda	July 23, 1998	April 17, 1999
56	54	56	"The Ultimate Test" (Pokémon League Certification Test!?); Transliteration: "Pokemon Rīgu Kenteishiken!?" (Japanese: ポケモンけんていしけん!?)	Osamu Inoue	Atsuhiro Tomioka	Masayuki Hiraoka	July 30, 1998	April 24, 1999
57	55	57	"The Breeding Center Secret" (The Secret of the Breeding Center!); Transliteration: "Sodate-ya no Himitsu!" (Japanese: そだてやのひみつ!)	Kiyotaka Itani	Yukiyoshi Ōhashi	Izumi Shimura	August 6, 1998	May 1, 1999
58	56	58	"Riddle Me This" (Burn! Guren Gym!); Transliteration: "Moero! Guren Jimu!" (Japanese: もえろ! グレンジム!)	Directed by : Shigeru Ōmachi; Storyboarded by : Kazu Yokota	Junki Takegami	Yūsaku Takeda	August 13, 1998	September 18, 1999
59	57	59	"Volcanic Panic" (Decisive Battle! Guren Gym!); Transliteration: "Kessen! Guren Jimu!" (Japanese: けっせん! グレンジム!)	Yūji Asada	Junki Takegami	Masaaki Iwane	August 20, 1998	September 18, 1999
60	58	60	"Beach Blank-Out Blastoise" (Kamex's Island); Transliteration: "Kamekkusu no Shima" (Japanese: カメックスのしま)	Directed by : Osamu Inoue; Storyboarded by : Takaaki Ishiyama	Atsuhiro Tomioka	Shin'ichirō Kajiura	August 27, 1998	September 20, 1999
61	59	61	"The Misty Mermaid" (Hanada Gym! Underwater Battle!); Transliteration: "Hanada Jimu! Suichū no Tatakai!" (Japanese: ハナダジム! すいちゅうのたたかい!)	Directed by : Yukio Okazaki; Storyboarded by : Kiyotaka Itani	Yukiyoshi Ōhashi	Hiromichi Hayashi	September 3, 1998	September 23, 1999
62	60	62	"Clefairy Tales" (Pippi vs. Purin); Transliteration: "Pippi Tai Purin" (Japanese: ピッピVSプリン)	Toshiaki Suzuki	Shinzō Fujita	Izumi Shimura	September 10, 1998	September 25, 1999
63	61	63	"The Battle of the Badge" (Tokiwa Gym! The Last Badge!); Transliteration: "Tokiwa Jimu! Saigo no Bajji!" (Japanese: トキワジム! さいごのバッジ!)	Directed by : Shigeru Ōmachi; Storyboarded by : Kazu Yokota	Hideki Sonoda	Yūsaku Takeda	September 17, 1998	September 25, 1999
64	62	64	"It's Mr. Mime Time!" (Barrierd of the Pokémon Circus); Transliteration: "Pokemon Sākasu no Bariyādo" (Japanese: ポケモンサーカスのバリヤード)	Osamu Inoue	Hideki Sonoda	Shin'ichirō Kajiura	September 24, 1998	September 27, 1999
65	63	65	"Holiday Hi-Jynx" (Rougela's Christmas); Transliteration: "Rūjura no Kurisumasu" (Japanese: ルージュラのクリスマス)	Yūji Asada	Hideki Sonoda	Keishi Sakai	October 5, 1998 (Note: Aired as a double-length special.)	December 11, 1999
66	64	66	"Snow Way Out" (Iwark as a Bivouac); Transliteration: "Iwāku de Bibāku" (Japanese: イワークでビバーク)	Directed by : Osamu Inoue; Storyboarded by : Yūji Asada	Shōji Yonemura	Shin'ichirō Kajiura	October 5, 1998	December 18, 1999
67	65	67	"Showdown at the Po-ké Corral" (Rival Showdown! Ōkido Laboratory); Transliteration: "Raibaru Taiketsu! Ōkido Kenkyūjo" (Japanese: ライバルたいけつ! オーキドけんきゅうじょ)	Directed by : Toshiaki Suzuki; Storyboarded by : Masamitsu Hidaka	Atsuhiro Tomioka	Izumi Shimura	October 8, 1998	September 30, 1999
68	66	68	"The Evolution Solution" (When Yadon Becomes Yadoran); Transliteration: "Yadon ga Yadoran ni naru Toki" (Japanese: ヤドンがヤドランになるとき)	Yūji Asada	Yukiyoshi Ōhashi	Masaaki Iwane	October 15, 1998	October 2, 1999
69	67	69	"The Pi-Kahuna" (Legend of the Surfing Pikachu); Transliteration: "Naminori Pikachū no Densetsu" (Japanese: なみのりピカチュウのでんせつ)	Directed by : Shigeru Ōmachi; Storyboarded by : Kazu Yokota	Shinzō Fujita	Yūsaku Takeda	October 22, 1998	October 2, 1999
70	68	70	"Make Room for Gloom" (Kusaihana of Botanical Garden); Transliteration: "Shokubutsuen no Kusaihana" (Japanese: しょくぶつえんのクサイハナ)	Kiyotaka Itani	Junki Takegami	Keishi Sakai	October 29, 1998	October 4, 1999
71	69	71	"Lights, Camera, Quack-tion!" (Pokémon the Movie!); Transliteration: "Pokemon za Mūbī!" (Japanese: ポケモン・ザ・ムービー!)	Directed by : Kiyotaka Itani; Storyboarded by : Toshiaki Suzuki	Shōji Yonemura	Izumi Shimura	November 5, 1998	October 8, 1999
72	70	72	"Go West, Young Meowth" (Nyarth's A-I-U-E-O); Transliteration: "Nyāsu no Aiueo" (Japanese: ニャースのあいうえお)	Directed by : Toshiaki Suzuki; Storyboarded by : Kunihiko Yuyama	Takeshi Shudō	Keishi Sakai	November 12, 1998	October 9, 1999
73	71	73	"To Master the Onixpected!" (Elite Four Shiba Appears!); Transliteration: "Shitennō Shiba Tōjō!" (Japanese: してんのうシバとうじょう!)	Osamu Inoue	Junki Takegami	Shin'ichirō Kajiura	November 19, 1998	October 11, 1999
74	72	74	"The Ancient Puzzle of Pokémopolis" (Clash! Super-Ancient Pokémon); Transliteration: "Gekitotsu! Chō Kodai Pokemon" (Japanese: げきとつ! ちょうこだいポケモン)	Kiyoshi Fukumoto	Atsuhiro Tomioka	Masaru Fukumoto	November 26, 1998	October 14, 1999
75	73	75	"Bad to the Bone!" (Garagara's Bone Club); Transliteration: "Garagara no Hone Konbō" (Japanese: ガラガラのホネこんぼう)	Yūji Asada	Yukiyoshi Ōhashi	Akihiro Tamagawa	December 3, 1998	October 16, 1999
76	74	76	"All Fired Up!" (Fire! The Pokémon League Opening Ceremony!); Transliteration: "Faiyā! Pokemon Rīgu Kaikaishiki!" (Japanese: ファイヤー! ポケモンリーグかいかいしき!)	Directed by : Keitarō Motonaga; Storyboarded by : Kiyotaka Itani	Hideki Sonoda	Masahiko Yoda	December 10, 1998	October 23, 1999
77	75	77	"Round One: Begin!" (Pokémon League Begins! Water Field!); Transliteration: "Pokemon Rīgu Kaimaku! Mizu no Fīrudo!" (Japanese: ポケモンリーグかいまく! みずのフィールド!)	Directed by : Shigeru Ōmachi; Storyboarded by : Kazu Yokota	Atsuhiro Tomioka	Yūsaku Takeda	December 17, 1998	October 30, 1999
78	76	78	"Fire and Ice" (Ice Field! Blazing Battle!); Transliteration: "Kōri no Fīrudo! Honō no Tatakai!" (Japanese: こおりのフィールド! ほのおのたたかい!)	Directed by : Kiyotaka Itani; Storyboarded by : Toshiaki Suzuki	Junki Takegami	Akihiro Tamagawa	December 24, 1998	November 6, 1999
79	77	79	"The Fourth Round Rumble" (Grass Field! Unexpected Rival!); Transliteration: "Kusa no Fīrudo! Igai na Kyōteki!" (Japanese: くさのフィールド! いがいなきょうてき!)	Yūji Asada	Yukiyoshi Ōhashi	Masaaki Iwane	January 1, 1999	November 13, 1999
80	78	80	"A Friend in Deed" (Rival Appears!); Transliteration: "Raibaru Tōjō!" (Japanese: ライバルとうじょう!)	Osamu Inoue	Shōji Yonemura	Shin'ichirō Kajiura	January 7, 1999	November 20, 1999
81	79	81	"Friend and Foe Alike" (Sekiei Stadium! Vs. Hiroshi!); Transliteration: "Sekiei Sutajiamu! Tai Hiroshi!" (Japanese: セキエイスタジアム! VSヒロシ!)	Kiyoshi Fukumoto	Hideki Sonoda	Masaru Fukumoto	January 14, 1999	November 27, 1999
82	80	82	"Friends to the End" (Pokémon League! Final Battle!); Transliteration: "Pokemon Rīgu! Saigo no Tatakai!" (Japanese: ポケモンリーグ! さいごのたたかい!)	Directed by : Shigeru Ōmachi; Storyboarded by : Yūji Asada	Shinzō Fujita	Yūsaku Takeda	January 21, 1999	November 27, 1999

=== Season 2: Adventures on the Orange Islands (1999) ===
Jap. overall	Eng. overall	No. in season	English title Japanese title	Original release date	English air date
83	81	1	"Pallet Party Panic" (Masara Town! Setting off on a New Journey); Transliteration: "Masara Taun! Aratanaru Tabidachi!" (Japanese: マサラタウン! あらたなるたびだち!)	January 28, 1999	December 4, 1999
84	82	2	"A Scare in the Air" (The Airship Hardship!?); Transliteration: "Hikōsen wa Fukōsen!?" (Japanese: ひこうせんはふこうせん!?)	February 4, 1999	January 8, 2000
85	83	3	"Pokéball Peril" (Southern Pokémon and the GS Ball); Transliteration: "Nangoku Pokemon to GS Bōru" (Japanese: なんごくポケモンとGSボール)	February 11, 1999	January 15, 2000
86	84	4	"The Lost Lapras" (Save Laplace!); Transliteration: "Rapurasu o Tasukero!" (Japanese: ラプラスをたすけろ!)	February 18, 1999	January 22, 2000
87	85	5	"Fit to Be Tide" (Orange League! Natsukan Gym!); Transliteration: "Orenji Rīgu! Natsukan Jimu!" (Japanese: オレンジリーグ! ナツカンジム!)	February 25, 1999	February 5, 2000
88	86	6	"Pikachu Re-Volts" (The Mystery of the Missing Pokémon!); Transliteration: "Kieta Pokemon-tachi no Nazo!" (Japanese: きえたポケモンたちのナゾ!)	March 4, 1999	February 5, 2000
89	87	7	"The Crystal Onix" (The Crystal Iwark); Transliteration: "Kurisutaru no Iwāku" (Japanese: クリスタルのイワーク)	March 11, 1999	February 5, 2000
90	88	8	"In the Pink" (The Island of Pink Pokémon); Transliteration: "Pinku no Pokemon-jima" (Japanese: ピンクのポケモンじま)	March 18, 1999	February 12, 2000
91	89	9	"Shell Shock" (The Secret of the Kabuto Fossils!); Transliteration: "Kabuto no Kaseki no Himitsu!" (Japanese: カブトのかせきのひみつ!)	March 25, 1999	March 4, 2000
92	90	10	"Stage Fight!" (Dance! Pokémon Showboat!); Transliteration: "Odoru! Pokémon Shōbōto!" (Japanese: おどる! ポケモンショーボート!)	April 1, 1999	February 12, 2000
93	91	11	"Bye Bye Psyduck" (Goodbye Koduck! Come Back Golduck?); Transliteration: "Sayonara Kodakku! Mata Kite Gorudakku?" (Japanese: さよならコダック! またきてゴルダック?)	April 8, 1999	February 26, 2000
94	92	12	"The Joy of Pokémon" (Sailing Joy! Cross the Raging Waves!); Transliteration: "Seiringu Jōi! Aranami o Koete!" (Japanese: セイリングジョーイ! あらなみをこえて!)	April 15, 1999	March 4, 2000
95	93	13	"Navel Maneuvers" (Navel Gym! Snowy Mountain Battle!); Transliteration: "Nēburu Jimu! Yuki Yama no Tatakai!" (Japanese: ネーブルジム! ゆきやまのたたかい!)	April 22, 1999	March 11, 2000
96	94	14	"Snack Attack" (Gluttonous Kabigon! Huge Panic!); Transliteration: "Ōgui Kabigon! Dai Panikku!" (Japanese: おおぐいカビゴン! だいパニック!)	April 29, 1999	March 25, 2000
97	95	15	"A Shipful of Shivers" (Ghost Ship and Ghost Pokémon!); Transliteration: "Yūreisen to Yūrei Pokemon!" (Japanese: ゆうれいせんとゆうれいポケモン!)	May 6, 1999	March 25, 2000
98	96	16	"Meowth Rules!" (Lord Nyarth's Island!?); Transliteration: "O Nyāsu-sama no Shima!?" (Japanese: おニャースさまのしま!?)	May 13, 1999	March 25, 2000
99	97	17	"Tracey Gets Bugged" (The Strike Soldier's Pride); Transliteration: "Sutoraiku Senshi no Hokori" (Japanese: ストライクせんしのほこり)	May 20, 1999	April 1, 2000
100	98	18	"A Way Off Day Off" (It's a Southern Island! Everyone Assemble!); Transliteration: "Minami no Shima da yo! Zen'in Shūgō!" (Japanese: みなみのしまだよ! ぜんいんしゅうごう!)	May 27, 1999	April 8, 2000
101	99	19	"The Mandarin Island Miss Match" (Elite Four Canna! Ice Battle!!); Transliteration: "Shitennō Kanna! Kōri no Tatakai!!" (Japanese: してんのうカンナ! こおりのたたかい!!)	June 3, 1999	April 15, 2000
102	100	20	"Wherefore Art Thou, Pokémon" (Nidoran's Love Story); Transliteration: "Nidoran no Koimonogatari" (Japanese: ニドランのこいものがたり)	June 10, 1999	April 22, 2000
103	101	21	"Get Along, Little Pokémon" (Coil on the Prairie!); Transliteration: "Daiheigen no Koiru-tachi!" (Japanese: だいへいげんのコイルたち!)	June 17, 1999	April 29, 2000
104	102	22	"The Mystery Menace" (Monster in the Sewers!?); Transliteration: "Chikadō no Kaibutsu!?" (Japanese: ちかどうのかいぶつ!?)	June 24, 1999	May 6, 2000
105	103	23	"Misty Meets Her Match" (Yuzu Gym! Type Battle 3 vs. 3!!); Transliteration: "Yuzu Jimu! Taipu Batoru San Tai San!!" (Japanese: ユズジム! タイプバトル3VS3!!)	July 1, 1999	September 9, 2000
106	104	24	"Bound for Trouble" (Pikachu vs. Nyarth!?); Transliteration: "Pikachū Tai Nyāsu!?" (Japanese: ピカチュウVSニャース!?)	July 15, 1999	September 15, 2000
107	105	25	"Charizard Chills" (Lizardon! I Choose You!!); Transliteration: "Rizādon! Kimi ni Kimeta!!" (Japanese: リザードン! きみにきめた!!)	July 22, 1999	September 2, 2000
108	106	26	"The Pokémon Water War" (Firefighting Showdown! Zenigame vs. Kameil); Transliteration: "Hikeshi Taiketsu! Zenigame Tai Kamēru" (Japanese: ひけしたいけつ! ゼニガメVSカメール)	July 29, 1999	August 26, 2000
109	107	27	"Pokémon Food Fight" (Burn! Kabigon!!); Transliteration: "Moe yo! Kabigon!!" (Japanese: もえよ! カビゴン!!)	August 5, 1999	August 19, 2000
110	108	28	"Pokémon Double Trouble" (Tag Battle! The Last Gym!!); Transliteration: "Taggu Batoru! Saigo no Jimu!!" (Japanese: タッグバトル! さいごのジム!!)	August 12, 1999	September 9, 2000
111	109	29	"The Wacky Watcher!" (Koiking! The Secret of Evolution!!); Transliteration: "Koikingu! Shinka no Himitsu!!" (Japanese: コイキング! しんかのひみつ!!)	August 19, 1999	September 16, 2000
112	110	30	"The Stun Spore Detour" (Nyoromo and Kasumi); Transliteration: "Nyoromo to Kasumi" (Japanese: ニョロモとカスミ)	August 26, 1999	September 16, 2000
113	111	31	"Hello, Pummelo!" (Winner's Cup! Full Battle 6 vs. 6!!); Transliteration: "Wināzu Kappu! Furu Batoru Roku Tai Roku!!" (Japanese: ウィナーズカップ! フルバトル6VS6!!)	September 2, 1999	September 23, 2000
114	112	32	"Enter the Dragonite" (Final Battle! Kairyu Appears!!); Transliteration: "Fainaru Batoru! Kairyū Tōjō!!" (Japanese: ファイナルバトル! カイリューとうじょう!!)	September 9, 1999	September 23, 2000
115	113	33	"Viva Las Lapras" (Goodbye Laplace!); Transliteration: "Sayonara Rapurasu!" (Japanese: さよならラプラス!)	September 16, 1999	September 30, 2000
116	114	34	"The Underground Round-Up" (Big Marumine Explosion!?); Transliteration: "Marumain Dai Bakuha!?" (Japanese: マルマインだいばくは!?)	September 23, 1999	September 30, 2000
117	115	35	"A Tent Situation" (Return to Masara Town!); Transliteration: "Kaettekita Masara Taun!" (Japanese: かえってきたマサラタウン!)	September 30, 1999	October 7, 2000
118	116	36	"The Rivalry Revival" (Rival Showdown! Satoshi vs. Shigeru!!); Transliteration: "Raibaru Taiketsu! Satoshi Tai Shigeru!!" (Japanese: ライバルたいけつ! サトシVSシゲル!!)	October 7, 1999	October 14, 2000

=== Season 3: The Johto Journeys (1999–2000) ===
Jap. overall	Eng. overall	No. in season	English title Japanese title	Original release date	English air date
119	117	1	"Don't Touch That 'dile" (Wakaba Town! Where the Winds of a New Beginning Blow!); Transliteration: "Wakaba Taun! Hajimari o Tsugeru Kaze ga Fuku Machi!" (Japanese: ワカバタウン! はじまりをつげるかぜのふくまち!)	October 14, 1999	October 14, 2000
120	118	2	"The Double Trouble Header" (The Rookie's Chicorita!); Transliteration: "Rūkī no Chikorīta!" (Japanese: ルーキーのチコリータ!)	October 21, 1999	October 21, 2000
121	119	3	"A Sappy Ending" (Crash! Heracros vs. Kailios!!); Transliteration: "Gekitotsu! Herakurosu Tai Kairosu!!" (Japanese: げきとつ! へラクロスVSカイロス!!)	October 28, 1999	October 28, 2000
122	120	4	"Roll On, Pokémon!" (Donfan's Valley!); Transliteration: "Donfan no Tani!" (Japanese: ドンファンのたに!)	November 4, 1999	November 4, 2000
123	121	5	"Illusion Confusion!" (Hoho and the Mysterious Forest!); Transliteration: "Hōhō to Ayashii Mori!" (Japanese: ホーホーとあやしいもり!)	November 11, 1999	November 4, 2000
124	122	6	"Flower Power" (Kireihana's Battle Dancing!); Transliteration: "Kireihana no Batoru Danshingu!" (Japanese: キレイハナのバトルダンシング!)	November 18, 1999	November 11, 2000
125	123	7	"Spinarak Attack" (Itomaru! Big Police Investigation!!); Transliteration: "Itomaru! Dai Sōsasen!!" (Japanese: イトマル! だいそうさせん!!)	November 25, 1999	November 11, 2000
126	124	8	"Snubbull Snobbery" (Bull's Magnificent Life!?); Transliteration: "Burū no Karei na Seikatsu!?" (Japanese: ブルーのかれいなせいかつ!?)	December 2, 1999	November 18, 2000
127	125	9	"The Little Big Horn" (Odoshishi! Forest of Illusions!?); Transliteration: "Odoshishi! Maboroshi no Mori!?" (Japanese: オドシシ！まぼろしのもり!?)	December 9, 1999	November 18, 2000
128	126	10	"The Chikorita Rescue" (The Stubborn Chicorita!!); Transliteration: "Ijippari no Chikorīta!!" (Japanese: いじっぱりのチコリータ!!)	December 16, 1999	November 25, 2000
129	127	11	"Once in a Blue Moon" (Nuoh and the GS Ball!?); Transliteration: "Nuō to GS Bōru!?" (Japanese: ヌオーとGSボール!?)	December 23, 1999	December 2, 2000
130	128	12	"The Whistle Stop" (Rediba's Flute!); Transliteration: "Rediba no Fue!" (Japanese: レディバのふえ!)	January 1, 2000	December 2, 2000
131	129	13	"Ignorance is Blissey" (Happinas's Happy Nurse!); Transliteration: "Hapinasu no Happī Nāsu!" (Japanese: ハピナスのハッピーナース!)	January 6, 2000	December 9, 2000
132	130	14	"A Bout with Sprout" (Big Pinch! Madatsubomi Tower!); Transliteration: "Dai Pinchi! Madatsubomi no Tō!" (Japanese: だいピンチ! マダツボミのとう!)	January 13, 2000	December 16, 2000
133	131	15	"Fighting Flyer with Fire" (Kikyou Gym! Sky Battle!!); Transliteration: "Kikyō Jimu! Ōzora no Tatakai!!" (Japanese: キキョウジム! おおぞらのたたかい!!)	January 20, 2000	December 16, 2000
134	132	16	"For Crying Out Loud" (Crybaby Maril!); Transliteration: "Nakimushi Mariru!" (Japanese: なきむしマリル!)	January 27, 2000	January 20, 2001
135	133	17	"Tanks a Lot!" (Pasture! Otachi & Togepy!!); Transliteration: "Bakusō! Otachi Ando Togepī!!" (Japanese: ばくそう! オタチ&トゲピー!!)	February 3, 2000	January 27, 2001
136	134	18	"Charizard's Burning Ambitions" (Lizardon's Valley! Until We Meet Again!!); Transliteration: "Rizādon no Tani! Mata Au Hi made!!" (Japanese: リザードンのたに! またあうひまで!!)	February 10, 2000	February 3, 2001
137	135	19	"Grin to Win!" (Big Panic! Kimawari Contest!!); Transliteration: "Dai Panikku! Kimawari Kontesuto!!" (Japanese: だいパニック! キマワリコンテスト!!)	February 17, 2000	February 10, 2001
138	136	20	"Chikorita's Big Upset" (Chicorita's Jealousy!?); Transliteration: "Chikorīta wa Gokigen Naname!?" (Japanese: チコリータはごきげんななめ!?)	February 24, 2000	January 20, 2001
139	137	21	"Foul Weather Friends" (Hanecco's Jealousy! Big Prairie Battle!!); Transliteration: "Hanekko Haneta! Daisōgen no Tatakai!!" (Japanese: ハネッコはねた! だいそうげんのたたかい!!)	March 2, 2000	February 10, 2001
140	138	22	"The Superhero Secret" (Mysterious Superhero! Gligerman Appears!!); Transliteration: "Nazo no Sūpāhīrō! Guraigāman Tōjō!!" (Japanese: なぞのスーパーヒーロー! グライガーマンとうじょう!!)	March 9, 2000	February 17, 2001
141	139	23	"Mild 'n Wooly" (Merriep Meadow's Girl); Transliteration: "Merīpu to Makiba no Shōjo" (Japanese: メリープとまきばのしょうじょ)	March 16, 2000	February 17, 2001
142	140	24	"Wired for Battle!" (Let's Battle! Hassam vs. Heracros!!); Transliteration: "Batoru Shiyō ze! Hassamu Tai Herakurosu!!" (Japanese: バトルしようぜ! ハッサムVSヘラクロス!!)	March 23, 2000	February 24, 2001
143	141	25	"Good 'Quil Hunting" (Hinoarashi! I Got It!!); Transliteration: "Hinoarashi! Getto da ze!!" (Japanese: ヒノアラシ! ゲットだぜ!!)	March 30, 2000	March 3, 2001
144	142	26	"A Shadow of a Drought" (Hiwada Town! Yadon's Well!!); Transliteration: "Hiwada Taun! Yadon no Ido!!" (Japanese: ヒワダタウン! ヤドンのいど!!)	April 6, 2000	March 3, 2001
145	143	27	"Going Apricorn!" (Kunugidama and the Bonguri Fruit! Backyard Battle!!); Transliteration: "Kunugidama to Bonguri no Mi! Urayama no Tatakai!!" (Japanese: クヌギダマとボングリのみ! うらやまのたたかい!!)	April 13, 2000	March 10, 2001
146	144	28	"Gettin' the Bugs Out" (Hiwada Gym! Forest Battlefield!!); Transliteration: "Hiwada Jimu! Mori no Batoru Fīrudo!!" (Japanese: ヒワダジム! もりのバトルフィールド!!)	April 20, 2000	March 17, 2001
147	145	29	"A Farfetch'd Tale" (Ubame's Forest! Search for Kamonegi!!); Transliteration: "Ubame no Mori! Kamonegi o Sagase!!" (Japanese: ウバメのもり! カモネギをさがせ!!)	April 27, 2000	March 17, 2001
148	146	30	"Tricks of the Trade" (Sonans and the Pokémon Exchange!!); Transliteration: "Sōnansu to Pokemon Kōkankai!!" (Japanese: ソーナンスとポケモンこうかんかい!!)	May 4, 2000	March 24, 2001
149	147	31	"The Fire-ing Squad!" (Burning Zenigame Squad! Like a Fire!!); Transliteration: "Moero Zenigame-dan! Honō no Yō ni!!" (Japanese: もえろゼニガメだん! ほのおのように!!)	May 11, 2000	April 21, 2001
150	148	32	"No Big Woop!" (Full of Upah!); Transliteration: "Upā ga Ippai!" (Japanese: ウパーがいっぱい!)	May 18, 2000	March 31, 2001
151	149	33	"Tunnel Vision" (Purin vs. Bull!); Transliteration: "Purin Tai Burū!" (Japanese: プリンVSブルー!)	May 25, 2000	April 7, 2001
152	150	34	"Hour of the Houndour" (Dark Pokémon – Delvil); Transliteration: "Dāku Pokemon, Derubiru" (Japanese: ダークポケモン・デルビル)	June 1, 2000	April 14, 2001
153	151	35	"The Totodile Duel" (Whose Waninoko is It!? Satoshi vs. Kasumi!); Transliteration: "Waninoko wa Dare no Mono!? Satoshi Tai Kasumi!" (Japanese: ワニノコはだれのもの!? サトシVSカスミ!)	June 8, 2000	May 5, 2001
154	152	36	"Hot Matches!" (Airmd vs. Hinoarashi! Wings of Steel!!); Transliteration: "Eamūdo Tai Hinoarashi! Hagane no Tsubasa!!" (Japanese: エアムードVSヒノアラシ! はがねのつばさ!!)	June 15, 2000	May 12, 2001
155	153	37	"Love, Totodile Style" (Dance, Waninoko! The Step of Love!!); Transliteration: "Odore Waninoko! Ai no Suteppu o!!" (Japanese: おどれワニノコ! あいのステップを!!)	June 22, 2000	May 26, 2001
156	154	38	"Fowl Play!" (Different-Colored Yorunozuku! I Got It!!); Transliteration: "Irochigai no Yorunozuku! Getto da ze!!" (Japanese: いろちがいのヨルノズク! ゲットだぜ!!)	June 29, 2000	April 28, 2001
157	155	39	"Forest Grumps" (Ringuma's Startling!!); Transliteration: "Ringuma de Dokkiri!!" (Japanese: リングマでドッキリ!!)	July 6, 2000	June 2, 2001
158	156	40	"The Psychic Sidekicks!" (Kirinriki! The Village of Esper Pokémon!); Transliteration: "Kirinriki! Esupā Pokemon no Mura!" (Japanese: キリンリキ! エスパーポケモンのむら!)	July 13, 2000	August 11, 2001
159	157	41	"The Fortune Hunters" (Pokémon Fortune-telling!? Enormous Melee!); Transliteration: "Pokemon Uranai!? Dairansen!" (Japanese: ポケモンうらない!? だいらんせん!)	July 27, 2000	May 19, 2001

=== Season 4: Johto League Champions (2000–01) ===
Jap. overall	Eng. overall	No. in season	English title Japanese title	Original release date	English air date
160	158	1	"A Goldenrod Opportunity" (Kogane Gym! Speed & Power!?); Transliteration: "Kogane Jimu! Supīdo ando Pawā!?" (Japanese: コガネジム! スピード&パワー!?)	August 3, 2000	August 18, 2001
161	159	2	"A Dairy Tale Ending" (Miltank! Revenge Battle!!); Transliteration: "Mirutanku! Ribenji Batoru!!" (Japanese: ミルタンク! リベンジバトル!!)	August 10, 2000	August 18, 2001
162	160	3	"Air Time!" (Battle of the Radio Tower! Surpass Spacetime!!); Transliteration: "Rajiotō no Tatakai! Jikū o Koete!!" (Japanese: ラジオとうのたたかい! じくうをこえて!!)	August 17, 2000	September 8, 2001
163	161	4	"The Bug Stops Here" (Bug Trainer Convention! Got It at the Natural Park!!); Transliteration: "Mushitori Taikai! Shizen Kōen de Getto da ze!!" (Japanese: むしとりたいかい! しぜんこうえんでゲットだぜ!!)	August 24, 2000	August 25, 2001
164	162	5	"Type Casting" (Where Is Usokkie!?); Transliteration: "Usokkī wa Doko ni Iru!?" (Japanese: ウソッキーはどこにいる!?)	August 31, 2000	September 1, 2001
165	163	6	"Fossil Fools" (Ancient Pokémon Park! Ruins of Alph!!); Transliteration: "Kodai Pokemon Pāku! Arufu no Iseki!!" (Japanese: こだいポケモンパーク! アルフのいせき!!)	September 7, 2000	September 15, 2001
166	164	7	"Carrying On" (The Carrier Poppo of the Poppo Store!); Transliteration: "Poppo ya no Densho Poppo!" (Japanese: ポッポやのでんしょポッポ!)	September 14, 2000	September 22, 2001
167	165	8	"Hassle in the Castle" (Zubat's Mansion! A Dangerous Labyrinth!!); Transliteration: "Zubatto no Yakata! Kiken na Meiro!!" (Japanese: ズバットのやかた! きけんなめいろ!!)	September 21, 2000	September 29, 2001
168	166	9	"Two Hits and a Miss" (Kapoerer vs. Fushigidane! Hand to Hand Showdown!!); Transliteration: "Kapoerā Tai Fushigidane! Kakutō Taiketsu!!" (Japanese: カポエラーVSフシギダネ! かくとうたいけつ!!)	September 28, 2000	September 15, 2001
169	167	10	"A Hot Water Battle" (The Three of the Jungle! Battle in the Hot Springs!!); Transliteration: "Janguru no San Biki! Onsen Batoru!!" (Japanese: ジャングルのさんびき! おんせんバトル!!)	October 5, 2000	September 22, 2001
170	168	11	"Hook, Line, and Stinker" (Azumao! Fishing Battle!!); Transliteration: "Azumaō! Fisshingu Batoru!!" (Japanese: アズマオウ! フィッシングバトル!!)	October 12, 2000	September 29, 2001
171	169	12	"Beauty and the Breeder" (Goodbye, Rokon! Pokémon Beauty Contest!!); Transliteration: "Sayonara Rokon! Pokemon Byūtī Kontesuto!!" (Japanese: さよならロコン! ポケモンビューティーコンテスト!!)	October 19, 2000	October 6, 2001
172	170	13	"A Better Pill to Swallow" (Tsubotsubo vs. Madatsubomi); Transliteration: "Tsubotsubo Tai Madatsubomi" (Japanese: ツボツボVSマダツボミ)	October 26, 2000	October 13, 2001
173	171	14	"Power Play!" (Blacky! Battle During a Dark Night!!); Transliteration: "Burakkī! Yamiyo no Tatakai!!" (Japanese: ブラッキー! やみよのたたかい!!)	November 2, 2000	October 20, 2001
174	172	15	"Mountain Time" (Redian! Exceeding the Valley of the Wind!!); Transliteration: "Redian! Kaze no Tani o Koete!!" (Japanese: レディアン! かぜのたにをこえて!!)	November 9, 2000	October 20, 2001
175	173	16	"Wobbu-Palooza" (Village of Sonans!?); Transliteration: "Sōnansu no Mura!?" (Japanese: ソーナンスのむら!?)	November 16, 2000	October 27, 2001
176	174	17	"Imitation Confrontation" (Aim to Be a Metamon Master! Imite Returns!!); Transliteration: "Mezase Metamon Masutā! Imite Futatabi!!" (Japanese: めざせメタモンマスター! イミテふたたび!!)	November 23, 2000	October 27, 2001
177	175	18	"The Trouble with Snubbull" (Nyarth, Bull and Granbull!?); Transliteration: "Nyāsu to Burū to Guranburu!?" (Japanese: ニャースとブルーとグランブル!?)	November 30, 2000	November 3, 2001
178	176	19	"Ariados, Amigos" (Ariados! Battle of Ninja Arts!!); Transliteration: "Ariadosu! Ninpō Batoru!!" (Japanese: アリアドス! にんぽうバトル!!)	December 7, 2000	November 17, 2001
179	177	20	"Wings 'N' Things" (Flap, Yanyanma! Fly to Tomorrow's Sky!!); Transliteration: "Habatake Yanyanma! Ashita no Sora e!!" (Japanese: はばたけヤンヤンマ! あしたのそらへ!!)	December 14, 2000	November 17, 2001
180	178	21	"The Grass Route" (Popocco! Grass Pokémon Battle!!); Transliteration: "Popokko! Kusa Pokemon Batoru!!" (Japanese: ポポッコ! くさポケモンバトル!!)	December 21, 2000	November 3, 2001
181	179	22	"The Apple Corp" (Pikachu and Pichu!); Transliteration: "Pikachū to Pichū!" (Japanese: ピカチュウとピチュー!)	January 4, 2001	December 1, 2001
182	180	23	"Houndoom's Special Delivery" (Hellgar and Togepy!); Transliteration: "Herugā to Togepī!" (Japanese: ヘルガーとトゲピー!)	January 11, 2001	December 1, 2001
183	181	24	"A Ghost of a Chance" (The Burned Tower! Matsuba Appears!!); Transliteration: "Yaketa Tō! Matsuba Tōjō!!" (Japanese: やけたとう! マツバとうじょう!!)	January 18, 2001	November 10, 2001
184	182	25	"From Ghost to Ghost" (Enju Gym! Ghost Battle!!); Transliteration: "Enju Jimu! Gōsuto Batoru!!" (Japanese: エンジュジム! ゴーストバトル!!)	January 25, 2001	November 10, 2001
185	183	26	"Trouble's Brewing" (The 5 Sisters of Eievui! Battle at the Tea Ceremony!!); Transliteration: "Ībui Go-Shimai! Ochakai de Batoru!!" (Japanese: イーブイ5しまい! おちゃかいでバトル!!)	February 1, 2001	December 8, 2001
186	184	27	"All That Glitters!" (Yamikarasu! The Stolen Badges!!); Transliteration: "Yamikarasu! Ubawareta Bajji!!" (Japanese: ヤミカラス! うばわれたバッジ!!)	February 8, 2001	December 15, 2001
187	185	28	"The Light Fantastic" (Teppouo's Sky!); Transliteration: "Teppouo no Sora!" (Japanese: テッポウオのそら!)	February 15, 2001	December 15, 2001
188	186	29	"UnBEARable" (Himeguma's Secret!); Transliteration: "Himeguma no Himitsu!" (Japanese: ヒメグマのひみつ!)	February 22, 2001	January 19, 2002
189	187	30	"Moving Pictures" (The Mystery of the Frozen Himanuts!!); Transliteration: "Kōtta Himanattsu no Nazo!!" (Japanese: こおったヒマナッツのなぞ!!)	March 1, 2001	January 26, 2002
190	188	31	"Spring Fever" (Dig Here, Urimoo! Search for the Hot Spring!!); Transliteration: "Koko Hore Urimū! Onsen o Sagase!!" (Japanese: ここほれウリムー! おんせんをさがせ!!)	March 8, 2001	February 2, 2002
191	189	32	"Freeze Frame" (Freezer vs. Purin! In the Middle of a Snowstorm!!); Transliteration: "Furīzā Tai Purin! Fubuki no Naka de!!" (Japanese: フリーザーVSプリン! ふぶきのなかで!!)	March 15, 2001	February 9, 2002
192	190	33	"The Stolen Stones!" (Windie and the Fire Stone!); Transliteration: "Uindi to Honō no Ishi!" (Japanese: ウインディとほのおのいし!)	March 22, 2001	February 16, 2002
193	191	34	"The Dunsparce Deception" (There Aren't Any Nokocchi Here!?); Transliteration: "Nokotchi wa no Kotchinai!?" (Japanese: ノコッチはのこっちない!?)	March 29, 2001	February 23, 2002
194	192	35	"The Wayward Wobbuffet" (Sonans! Is That So?); Transliteration: "Sōnansu! Sō nan su?" (Japanese: ソーナンス! そうなんす?)	April 5, 2001	March 2, 2002
195	193	36	"Sick Daze" (Takeshi Collapses! A Dangerous Camp!!); Transliteration: "Takeshi Taoreru! Abunai Kyanpu!!" (Japanese: タケシたおれる! あぶないキャンプ!!)	April 12, 2001	March 9, 2002
196	194	37	"Ring Masters" (Ordile vs. Kamex! Sumo Battle!!); Transliteration: "Ōdairu Tai Kamekkusu! Sumō Batoru!!" (Japanese: オーダイルVSカメックス! すもうバトル!!)	April 19, 2001	March 16, 2002
197	195	38	"The Poké-Spokesman" (You Can Speak with Pokémon!? The Words and Feelings of Pokémon!); Transliteration: "Pokemon to Hanasemasu!? Pokemon no Kotoba Pokemon no Kimochi!" (Japanese: ポケモンとはなせます!? ポケモンのことばポケモンのきもち!)	April 26, 2001	March 23, 2002
198	196	39	"Control Freak!" (Golbat vs. the Masked Queen Musashi! The Ruins Battle!!); Transliteration: "Gorubatto Tai Kamen no Joō Musashi! Iseki no Tatakai!!" (Japanese: ゴルバットVSかめんのじょおうムサシ! いせきのたたかい!!)	May 3, 2001	March 30, 2002
199	197	40	"The Art of Pokémon" (The Miracle of Doble!! Shining in the Morning Sun!); Transliteration: "Dōburu no Kiseki!! Asahi no Naka de Kagayaite!" (Japanese: ドーブルのきせき!! あさひのなかでかがやいて!)	May 10, 2001	April 6, 2002
200	198	41	"The Heartbreak of Brock" (Nidorino, Nidorina! Takeshi's Rose-colored Days!?); Transliteration: "Nidorīno Nidorīna! Takeshi no Barairo no Hibi!?" (Japanese: ニドリーノニドリーナ! タケシばらいろのひび!?)	May 17, 2001	April 13, 2002
201	199	42	"Current Events" (Goodbye, Chicorita!? The Labyrinth of Electricity!); Transliteration: "Sayonara Chikorita!? Denki no Rabirinsu!" (Japanese: さよならチコリータ!? でんきのラビリンス!)	May 24, 2001	April 27, 2002
202	200	43	"Turning Over a New Bayleef" (Where Did Bayleef Go!? Capture at the Herb Garden!); Transliteration: "Beirīfu wa Doko ni Itta!? Hābu Batake de Tsukamaete!" (Japanese: ベイリーフはどこへいった!? ハーブばたけでつかまえて!)	May 31, 2001	May 4, 2002
203	201	44	"Doin' What Comes Natu-rally" (Naty Fortune Teller! The Mystery of Telling the Future!!); Transliteration: "Neiti Uranai! Mirai Yochi no Shinpi!!" (Japanese: ネイティうらない! みらいよちのしんぴ!!)	June 7, 2001	May 18, 2002
204	202	45	"The Big Balloon Blow-Up" (The Big Pokémon Balloon Race! Get Past the Storm!!); Transliteration: "Pokemon Kikyū Dai Rēsu! Arashi o Koete!!" (Japanese: ポケモンききゅうだいレース! あらしをこえて!!)	June 14, 2001	May 25, 2002
205	203	46	"The Screen Actor's Guilt" (Muchul is Daydreaming!! Do Superstars Like Pokémon?); Transliteration: "Muchūru ni Mō Muchū!! Sūpāsutā wa Pokemon ga Osuki?" (Japanese: ムチュールにもうむちゅう!! スーパースターはポケモンがおすき?)	June 21, 2001	June 1, 2002
206	204	47	"Right On, Rhydon!" (Follow the Surfing Sidon!? The Battle at the Lake!); Transliteration: "Naminori Saidon o Oe!? Mizuumi no Tatakai!" (Japanese: なみのりサイドンをおえ!? みずうみのたたかい!)	June 28, 2001	June 22, 2002
207	205	48	"The Kecleon Caper" (Where's Kakureon!? Huge Chaos Created by the Invisible Pokémon!); Transliteration: "Kakureon wa Doko ni Iru!? Mienai Pokemon ni Daikonran!" (Japanese: カクレオンはどこにいる!? みえないポケモンにだいこんらん!)	July 5, 2001	August 17, 2002
208	206	49	"The Joy of Water Pokémon" (The Nurse Joy who Hates Water Pokémon!? Kasumi's Anger!); Transliteration: "Mizu Pokemon-Girai no Joī-san!? Kasumi no Ikari!" (Japanese: みずポケモンぎらいのジョーイさん!? カスミのいかり!)	July 12, 2001	August 24, 2002
209	207	50	"Got Miltank?" (The Mother Miltank! The Desert's Secret!); Transliteration: "Seibo Mirutanku! Sabaku no Himitsu!" (Japanese: せいぼミルタンク! さばくのひみつ!)	July 19, 2001	August 31, 2002
210	208	51	"Fight for the Light" (Radiance Lighthouse! Battle at Asagi City!!); Transliteration: "Kagayaki no Tōdai! Asagi Shiti no Tatakai!!" (Japanese: かがやきのとうだい! アサギシティのたたかい!!)	July 26, 2001	September 7, 2002
211	209	52	"Machoke, Machoke Man!" (Tanba Gym! Front-Game Wrestling Showdown!!); Transliteration: "Tanba Jimu! Makkō Shōbu Kakutō Taiketsu!!" (Japanese: タンバジム! まっこうしょうぶかくとうたいけつ!!)	August 2, 2001	September 7, 2002

=== Season 5: Master Quest (2001–02) ===
Jap. overall	Eng. overall	No. in season	English title Japanese title	Original release date	English air date
212	210	1	"Around the Whirlpool" (The Whirlpool Islands! A New Challenge!!); Transliteration: "Uzumaki Rettō! Aratanaru Chōsen!!" (Japanese: うずまきれっとう! あらたなるちょうせん!!)	August 9, 2001	September 14, 2002
213	211	2	"Fly Me to the Moon" (Poppo and the Enormous Poppo! Towards the As Yet Unseen Sky!!); Transliteration: "Poppo to Deka Poppo! Mada Minu Sora e!!" (Japanese: ポッポとデカポッポ! まだみぬそらへ!!)	August 16, 2001	September 21, 2002
214	212	3	"Takin' It on the Chinchou!" (Set Out to the Sea! Line of Chonchie!!); Transliteration: "Tabidate Umi e! Chonchī Gyōretsu!!" (Japanese: たびだてうみへ! チョンチーぎょうれつ!!)	August 23, 2001	September 28, 2002
215	213	4	"A Corsola Caper!" (Sunnygo the Amigo! Showdown on Yellow Rock Isle!!); Transliteration: "Sanīgo de Amīgo! Ō Gantō no Taiketsu!!" (Japanese: サニーゴでアミーゴ! おうがんとうのたいけつ!!)	August 30, 2001	October 5, 2002
216	214	5	"Mantine Overboard!" (Mantain and the Sunken Ship!! The Secret of the Mysterious Pokémon!); Transliteration: "Mantain to Chinbotsusen!! Nazo no Pokemon no Himitsu!" (Japanese: マンタインとちんぼつせん!! なぞのポケモンのひみつ!)	September 6, 2001	October 12, 2002
217	215	6	"Octillery the Outcast" (Okutank and Teppouo! Whirlpool Cup Preliminaries!!); Transliteration: "Okutan to Teppouo! Uzumaki Kappu Yosen!!" (Japanese: オクタンとテッポウオ! うずまきカップよせん!!)	September 13, 2001	October 19, 2002
218	216	7	"Dueling Heroes" (Whirlpool Cup! A Big Battle in the Water Colosseum!!); Transliteration: "Uzumaki Kappu! Mizu no Koroshiamu de Daibatoru!!" (Japanese: うずまきカップ! みずのコロシアムでだいバトル!!)	September 20, 2001	October 26, 2002
219	217	8	"The Perfect Match!" (Satoshi vs. Kasumi! The Final Battle in the Whirlpool Cup!!); Transliteration: "Satoshi Tai Kasumi! Uzumaki Kappu Saigo no Tatakai!!" (Japanese: サトシVSカスミ! うずまきカップさいごのたたかい!!)	September 27, 2001	November 2, 2002
220	218	9	"Plant It Now... Diglett Later" (Protect the Digda Village! The Big Pitfall Strategy!?); Transliteration: "Diguda no Mura o Mamore! Otoshiana Daisakusen!?" (Japanese: ディグダのむらをまもれ! おとしあなだいさくせん!?)	October 4, 2001	November 9, 2002
221	219	10	"Hi Ho Silver... Away!" (The Legend of Silver Wings! Battle at Silver Rock Island!!); Transliteration: "Gin'iro no Hane no Densetsu! Gin Gantō no Tatakai!!" (Japanese: ぎんいろのはねのでんせつ! ぎんがんとうのたたかい!!)	October 11, 2001	November 16, 2002
222	220	11	"The Mystery Is History" (Mysterious Pokémon X!!); Transliteration: "Nazono Pokemon X!!" (Japanese: なぞのポケモンX!!)	October 18, 2001	November 23, 2002
223	221	12	"A Parent Trapped!" (The Captive Lugia); Transliteration: "Torawareno Rugia" (Japanese: とらわれのルギア)	October 25, 2001	November 30, 2002
224	222	13	"A Promise is a Promise" (The Promise with Lugia!); Transliteration: "Rugia to no Yakusoku!" (Japanese: ルギアとのやくそく!)	November 1, 2001	December 7, 2002
225	223	14	"Throwing in the Noctowl" (Fly Flight Hoho! Head for Asagi!!); Transliteration: "Tobe Hōhō-gō! Asagi o Mezashi!!" (Japanese: とべホーホーごう! アサギをめざし!!)	November 8, 2001	December 14, 2002
226	224	15	"Nerves of Steelix!" (Asagi Gym! Vs. Haganeil!!); Transliteration: "Asagi Jimu! Tai Haganēru!!" (Japanese: アサギジム! VSハガネール!!)	November 15, 2001	December 21, 2002
227	225	16	"Bulbasaur... the Ambassador!" (Farewell, Fushigidane! Adventure at Dr. Okido's!!); Transliteration: "Sayonara Fushigidane! Ōkido-tei no Bōken" (Japanese: さよならフシギダネ! オーキドていのぼうけん!!)	November 22, 2001	September 23, 2002
228	226	17	"Espeon, Not Included" (Eifie and Sakura! Enju City Once Again!!); Transliteration: "Ēfi to Sakura! Enju Shitei Futatabi!!" (Japanese: エーフィとサクラ! エンジュシティふたたび!!)	November 29, 2001	September 24, 2002
229	227	18	"For Ho-Oh the Bells Toll!" (Suikun and Minaki! The Legend of Houou!!); Transliteration: "Suikun to Minaki! Hōō no Densetsu!!" (Japanese: スイクンとミナキ! ホウオウのでんせつ!!)	December 6, 2001	September 25, 2002
230	228	19	"Extreme Pokémon!" (Run Quickly Along the Pokémon Ride!!); Transliteration: "Pokemon Raido de Tsuppashire!!" (Japanese: ポケモンライドでつっぱしれ!!)	December 13, 2001	January 4, 2003
231	229	20	"An EGG-sighting Adventure!" (Famous Detective Junsar! The Mystery of the Disappeared Egg!!); Transliteration: "Meitantei Junsā! Kieta Tamago no Nazo!!" (Japanese: めいたんていジュンサー! きえたタマゴのなぞ!!)	December 20, 2001	January 11, 2003
232	230	21	"Hatching a Plan" (Egg, Hatch); Transliteration: "Tamago, Kaeru" (Japanese: タマゴ、かえる)	December 27, 2001	January 18, 2003
233	231	22	"Dues and Don'ts" (Rocket-dan and Delibird!); Transliteration: "Roketto-dan to Deribādo!" (Japanese: ロケットだんとデリバード!)	January 10, 2002	January 25, 2003
234	232	23	"Just Waiting On a Friend" (The Kyukon in the Fog!); Transliteration: "Kiri no Naka no Kyūkon!" (Japanese: きりのなかのキュウコン!)	January 17, 2002	September 26, 2002
235	233	24	"A Tyrogue Full of Trouble" (Balkie and the Karate King Nobuhiko!); Transliteration: "Barukī to Karateō Nobuhiko!" (Japanese: バルキーとからておうノブヒコ!)	January 24, 2002	February 1, 2003
236	234	25	"Xatu the Future" (Natio's Big Prediction!); Transliteration: "Neitio no Daiyogen!" (Japanese: ネイティオのだいよげん!)	January 31, 2002	February 8, 2003
237	235	26	"Talkin' 'Bout an Evolution" (Wataru and the Red Gyarados!); Transliteration: "Wataru to Akai Gyaradosu!" (Japanese: ワタルとあかいギャラドス!)	February 7, 2002	February 15, 2003
238	236	27	"Rage of Innocence" (Red Gyarados's Anger!); Transliteration: "Akai Gyaradosu no Ikari!" (Japanese: あかいギャラドスのいかり!)	February 14, 2002	February 22, 2003
239	237	28	"As Cold as Pryce" (Inomoo and Yanagi of the Winter!); Transliteration: "Inomū to Fuyu no Yanagi!" (Japanese: イノムーとふゆのヤナギ!)	February 21, 2002	March 1, 2003
240	238	29	"Nice Pryce, Baby!" (Chouji Gym! Ice Battle!); Transliteration: "Chōji Jimu! Kōri no Tatakai!" (Japanese: チョウジジム! こおりのたたかい!)	February 28, 2002	March 8, 2003
241	239	30	"Whichever Way the Wind Blows" (Kireihana and Ruffresia! Peace in Meadow!); Transliteration: "Kireihana to Rafureshia! Sōgen no Heiwa!" (Japanese: キレイハナとラフレシア! そうげんのへいわ!)	March 7, 2002	March 22, 2003
242	240	31	"Some Like It Hot" (Magcargot! Getting the Hot Heart!!); Transliteration: "Magukarugo! Atsui Kokoro de Getto da ze!!" (Japanese: マグカルゴ! あついこころでゲットだぜ!!)	March 14, 2002	March 29, 2003
243	241	32	"Hocus Pokémon" (A Huge Transformation with Pokémon Magic!?); Transliteration: "Pokemon Mahō de Daihenshin!?" (Japanese: ポケモンまほうでだいへんしん!?)	March 21, 2002	April 5, 2003
244	242	33	"As Clear as Crystal" (Thunder and the Crystal! Secret of the Lake!); Transliteration: "Sandā to Kurisutaru! Mizuumi no Himitsu!" (Japanese: サンダーとクリスタル! みずうみのひみつ!)	March 28, 2002	April 12, 2003
245	243	34	"Same Old Song and Dance" (Pupurin Twins vs. Purin! Singing Pokémon Concert!); Transliteration: "Futago no Pupurin Tai Purin! Utau Pokemon Konsāto!" (Japanese: ふたごのププリンVSプリン! うたうポケモンコンサート!)	April 11, 2002	April 19, 2003
246	244	35	"Enlighten Up!" (Yadon's Comprehension! Satoshi's Comprehension!); Transliteration: "Yadon no Satori! Satoshi no Satori!" (Japanese: ヤドンのさとり! サトシのさとり!)	April 18, 2002	April 26, 2003
247	245	36	"Will the Real Oak Please Stand Up?" (Fake Okido!? Pokémon Senryu Confrontation!!); Transliteration: "Nise Ōkido!? Pokemon Senryū Taiketsu!!" (Japanese: にせオーキド!? ポケモンせんりゅうたいけつ!!)	April 25, 2002	September 27, 2002
248	246	37	"Wish Upon a Star Shape" (Py, Pippy and the Shooting Star!); Transliteration: "Pī to Pippi to Nagareboshi!" (Japanese: ピィとピッピとながれぼし!)	May 2, 2002	May 3, 2003
249	247	38	"Outrageous Fortunes" (Nyorozo's Evolution!); Transliteration: "Nyorozo no Shinka!" (Japanese: ニョロゾのしんか!)	May 9, 2002	May 10, 2003
250	248	39	"One Trick Phony!" (Battle Park! Vs. Kamex, Lizardon, Fushigibana!); Transliteration: "Batoru Pāku! Tai Kamekkusu, Rizādon, Fushigibana!" (Japanese: バトルパーク! VSカメックス・リザードン・フシギバナ!)	May 16, 2002	May 17, 2003
251	249	40	"I Politoed Ya So!" (Nyorotono's Cheerleading!); Transliteration: "Nyorotono no Chiarīdeingu!" (Japanese: ニョロトノのチアリーディング!)	May 23, 2002	May 24, 2003
252	— (Note: This episode was pulled from rotation in international broadcasts.)	41	The Ice Cave! Transliteration: "Kōri no Dōkutsu!" (Japanese: こおりのどうくつ!)	May 30, 2002	N/A
253	250	42	"Beauty Is Skin Deep" (Ibuki and Miniryu!); Transliteration: "Ibuki to Miniryū!" (Japanese: イブキとミニリュウ!)	June 6, 2002	May 31, 2003
254	251	43	"Fangs for Nothin'" (Fusube Gym's Dragon Fang!); Transliteration: "Fusube Jimu no Ryū no Kiba!" (Japanese: フスベジムのりゅうのきば!)	June 13, 2002	June 7, 2003
255	252	44	"Great Bowls of Fire!" (Kairyu! Use Imperial Rage!); Transliteration: "Kairyū! Gekirin Hatsudō!" (Japanese: カイリュー! げきりんはつどう!)	June 20, 2002	June 14, 2003
256	253	45	"Better Eight Than Never" (Fusube Gym! The Final Badge!!); Transliteration: "Fusube Jimu! Saigo no Bajji!!" (Japanese: フスベジム! さいごのバッジ!!)	June 27, 2002	June 21, 2003
257	254	46	"Why? Wynaut!" (Sohnano!? Gym Badges and Sonans!!); Transliteration: "Sōnano!? Jimu Bajji to Sōnansu!!" (Japanese: ソーナノ!? ジムバッジとソーナンス!!)	July 4, 2002	June 28, 2003
258	255	47	"Just Add Water" (Ryugu Gym! Battle in the Water!); Transliteration: "Ryūgū Jimu! Mizu no Nakade Batoru da ze!" (Japanese: リュウグウジム! みずのなかでバトルだぜ!)	July 11, 2002	July 12, 2003
259	256	48	"Lapras of Luxury" (Laplace's Song!); Transliteration: "Rapurasu no Uta!" (Japanese: ラプラスのうた!)	July 18, 2002	July 26, 2003
260	257	49	"Hatch Me If You Can" (Protecting the Egg! The Life Born in a Storm!); Transliteration: "Tamago o Mamore! Arashi no Naka de Umareta Inochi!" (Japanese: タマゴをまもれ! あらしのなかでうまれたいのち!)	July 25, 2002	August 9, 2003
261	258	50	"Entei at Your Own Risk" (Entei and Friends of the Hot Spring!); Transliteration: "Entei to Onsen no Nakama-tachi!" (Japanese: エンテイとおんせんのなかまたち!)	August 1, 2002	August 16, 2003
262	259	51	"A Crowning Achievement" (Yadoking! King's Symbol!); Transliteration: "Yadokingu! Ōja no Shirushi!" (Japanese: ヤドキング! おうじゃのしるし!)	August 8, 2002	August 23, 2003
263	260	52	"Here's Lookin' at You, Elekid" (Nanako and Elekid!); Transliteration: "Nanako to Erekiddo!" (Japanese: ナナコとエレキッド!)	August 15, 2002	August 30, 2003
264	261	53	"You're a Star, Larvitar!" (Do Your Best, Yogiras!); Transliteration: "Yōgirasu Ganbaru!" (Japanese: ヨーギラスがんばる!)	August 22, 2002	September 6, 2003
265	262	54	"Address Unown!" (Unknown of the Country of Mystery); Transliteration: "Fushigi no Kuni no Annōn" (Japanese: ふしぎのくにのアンノーン)	August 29, 2002	September 13, 2003
266	263	55	"Mother of All Battles" (Bangiras and Yogiras!); Transliteration: "Bangirasu to Yōgirasu!" (Japanese: バンギラスとヨーギラス!)	September 5, 2002	September 15, 2003
267	264	56	"Pop Goes the Sneasel" (Nyula and the Sacred Flame!); Transliteration: "Nyūra to Seinaru Honō!" (Japanese: ニューラとせいなるほのお!)	September 12, 2002	September 16, 2003
268	265	57	"A Claim to Flame!" (Silver League Begins! Shigeru Returns!); Transliteration: "Shirogane Rīgu Kaimaku! Shigeru Futatabi!" (Japanese: シロガネリーグかいまく! シゲルふたたび!)	September 19, 2002	September 17, 2003
269	266	58	"Love, Pokémon Style" (League Preliminaries! Battle of the Magmarashi Flame!!); Transliteration: "Yosen Rīgu! Magumarashi Honō no Batoru!!" (Japanese: よせんリーグ! マグマラシほのおのバトル!!)	September 26, 2002	September 18, 2003
270	267	59	"Tie One On!" (Meganium vs. Fushigidane! Spirit of the Grass Types!); Transliteration: "Meganiumu Tai Fushigidane! Kusa Taipu no Iji!" (Japanese: メガニウムVSフシギダネ! くさタイプのいじ!)	October 3, 2002	September 19, 2003
271	268	60	"The Ties That Bind" (League Finals! Full Battle 6 vs. 6!!); Transliteration: "Kesshō Rīgu! Furu Batoru Roku Tai Roku!!" (Japanese: けっしょうリーグ! フルバトル6VS6!!)	October 10, 2002	September 20, 2003
272	269	61	"Can't Beat the Heat!" (Rival Confrontation! Kamex vs. Lizardon!!); Transliteration: "Raibaru Taiketsu! Kamekkusu Tai Rizādon!!" (Japanese: ライバルたいけつ! カメックスVSリザードン!!)	October 17, 2002	September 27, 2003
273	270	62	"Playing with Fire!" (Bursyamo Returns! Battle Against Hazuki!!); Transliteration: "Bashāmo Futatabi! Hazuki to no Tatakai!!" (Japanese: バシャーモふたたび! ハヅキとのたたかい!!)	October 24, 2002	October 4, 2003
274	271	63	"Johto Photo Finish" (To the End of the Destiny Battle! Respective Way!!); Transliteration: "Furu Batoru no Hate ni! Sorezore no Michi!!" (Japanese: フルバトルのはてに! それぞれのみち!!)	October 31, 2002	October 11, 2003
275	272	64	"Gotta Catch Ya Later!" (Goodbye... And Then, Setting Off!); Transliteration: "Sayonara... Soshite, Tabidachi!" (Japanese: サヨナラ…そして、たびだち!)	November 7, 2002	October 18, 2003
276	273	65	"Hoenn Alone!" (Parting with Pikachu...!); Transliteration: "Pikachū to no Wakare...!" (Japanese: ピカチュウとのわかれ!)	November 14, 2002	October 25, 2003

=== Season 6: Advanced (2002–03) ===
Jap. overall	Eng. overall	No. in season	English title Japanese title	Original release date	English air date
277	274	1	"Get the Show on the Road!" (A New Land! A New Adventure!!); Transliteration: "Aratanaru Daichi! Aratanaru Bōken!!" (Japanese: 新たなる大地! 新たなる冒険!!)	November 21, 2002	November 1, 2003 (Note: These episodes were broadcast on Kids' WB on March 15, 2003, as part of a special sneak peek at the upcoming Advanced season. It was later redubbed and rebroadcast for inclusion during the standard broadcasts the following November.)
278	275	2	"A Ruin with a View" (Ancient Pokémon and Mysterious Teams!); Transliteration: "Kodai Pokémon to Nazo no Gundan!" (Japanese: 古代ポケモンと謎の軍団!)	November 28, 2002	November 8, 2003
279	276	3	"There's No Place Like Hoenn" (Tōka Gym! Vs. Yarukimono!); Transliteration: "Tōka Jimu! Tai Yarukimono!" (Japanese: トウカジム! VSヤルキモノ!)	December 5, 2002	November 15, 2003
280	277	4	"You Never Can Taillow" (Full of Subame, Full of Danger! Got It in Tōka Woods!); Transliteration: "Subame ga Ippai, Kiken ga Ippai! Tōka no Mori de Getto da ze!!" (Japanese: スバメがいっぱい 危険がいっぱい! トウカの森でゲットだぜ!!)	December 12, 2002	November 22, 2003
281	278	5	"In the Knicker of Time!" (Jiguzaguma and Short-Pantsed Boy! Haruka's First Battle!!); Transliteration: "Jigujaguma to Tanpan-kozō! Haruka Hajimete no Batoru!!" (Japanese: ジグザグマと短パン小僧! ハルカはじめてのバトル!!)	December 19, 2002	November 22, 2003
282	279	6	"A Poached Ego!" (Team Rocket! Goodbye to a Disturbed Scratch!!); Transliteration: "Roketto-dan! Midare Hikkagi de Sayōnara!!" (Japanese: ロケット団! みだれひっかきでサヨウナラ!!)	December 26, 2002	November 29, 2003
283	280	7	"Tree's a Crowd" (Forest of Kimori! Protect the Giant Tree!!); Transliteration: "Kimori no Mori! Kyodaiju o Mamore!!" (Japanese: キモリの森! 巨大樹を守れ!!)	January 9, 2003	November 29, 2003
284	281	8	"A Tail with a Twist" (Habunake vs. Kimori! Strike of Death!!); Transliteration: "Habuneku Tai Kimori! Hissatsu no Hataku Kōgeki!!" (Japanese: ハブネークVSキモリ! 必殺のはたく攻撃!!)	January 16, 2003	December 6, 2003
285	282	9	"Taming of the Shroomish" (Bizarre! Mystery of the Kinococo Mansion!); Transliteration: "Kaiki! Kinokoko Yashiki no Nazo!" (Japanese: 怪奇! キノココ屋敷の謎!)	January 23, 2003	December 6, 2003
286	283	10	"You Said a Mouthful!" (The Strongest Pelipper in History Appears!!); Transliteration: "Shijō Saikyō no Perippā Arawareru!!" (Japanese: 史上最強のペリッパー現る!!)	January 30, 2003	December 13, 2003
287	284	11	"A Bite to Remember" (Guraena and Pochiena! Mystery of Evolution!!); Transliteration: "Guraena to Pochiena! Shinka no Shinpi!!" (Japanese: グラエナとポチエナ! 進化の神秘!!)	February 6, 2003	December 13, 2003
288	285	12	"The Lotad Lowdown" (Hassboh and the Three Sisters of the Flower Shop!); Transliteration: "Hasubō to Furawā Shoppu no San-Shimai!" (Japanese: ハスボーとフラワーショップの三姉妹!)	February 13, 2003	December 20, 2003
289	286	13	"All Things Bright and Beautifly!" (Pokémon Contest! Agehunt's Magnificent Battle!!); Transliteration: "Pokemon Kontesuto! Agehanto no Karei na Batoru!!" (Japanese: ポケモンコンテスト! アゲハントの華麗なバトル!!)	February 20, 2003	December 27, 2003
290	287	14	"All in a Day's Wurmple" (Double Battle and Double Kemusso!?); Transliteration: "Daburu Batoru to Daburu de Kemusso!?" (Japanese: ダブルバトルとダブルでケムッソ!?)	February 27, 2003	January 3, 2004
291	288	15	"Gonna Rule the School!" (Try to Study! Pokémon Trainer's School!!); Transliteration: "Benkyō-shimasu! Pokemon Torēnāzu Sukūru!!" (Japanese: 勉強します! ポケモントレーナーズスクール!!)	March 6, 2003	January 10, 2004
292	289	16	"The Winner by a Nosepass" (Kanazumi Gym! Nosepass's Secret Weapon!!); Transliteration: "Kanazumi Jimu! Nozupasu no Himitsu Heiki!!" (Japanese: カナズミジム! ノズパスの秘密兵器!!)	March 13, 2003	January 10, 2004
293	290	17	"Stairway to Devon" (Devon Corporation! Shadow of Team Aqua!!); Transliteration: "Debon Kōporēshon! Akua-dan no Kage!!" (Japanese: デボンコーポレーション! アクア団の影!!)	March 20, 2003	January 17, 2004
294	291	18	"On a Wingull and a Prayer!" (Old Man Hagi and Peeko the Camome!); Transliteration: "Hagi-rōjin to Kyamome no Pīko-chan!" (Japanese: ハギ老人とキャモメのピーコちゃん!)	March 27, 2003	January 24, 2004
295	292	19	"Sharpedo Attack!" (Escape! Samehader's Island!!); Transliteration: "Dasshutsu! Samehadā no Shima!!" (Japanese: 脱出! サメハダーの島!!)	April 3, 2003	January 31, 2004
296	293	20	"Brave the Wave" (Muro Gym! The Surfing Leader – Touki Appears!); Transliteration: "Muro Jimu! Naminori ri Jimu Rīdā, Tōki Tōjō!" (Japanese: ムロジム! 波乗りジムリーダー・トウキ登場!)	April 10, 2003	February 7, 2004
297	294	21	"Which Wurmple's Which?" (Kemusso vs. Kemusso! Which is Which!?); Transliteration: "Kemusso Tai Kemusso! Dotchi ga Dotchi!?" (Japanese: ケムッソVSケムッソ! どっちがどっち!?)	April 17, 2003	February 14, 2004
298	295	22	"A Hole Lotta Trouble" (Daigo, Cockodora and Bossgodora!); Transliteration: "Daigo, Kokodora, Bosugodora!" (Japanese: ダイゴ、ココドラ、ボスゴドラ!)	April 24, 2003	February 14, 2004
299	296	23	"Gone Corphishin'" (Roughneck of the Sea, Heigani Appears!); Transliteration: "Umibe no Abare Mono, Heigani Tōjō!" (Japanese: 海辺の暴れ者、ヘイガニ登場!)	May 1, 2003	February 21, 2004
300	297	24	"A Corphish Out of Water" (Run Satoshi! Cross the Kibanha River!); Transliteration: "Hashire Satoshi! Kibania no Kawa o Koe!" (Japanese: 走れサトシ! キバニアの川を越え!)	May 8, 2003	February 28, 2004
301	298	25	"A Mudkip Mission" (The Secret Pond! Full of Mizugorou!?); Transliteration: "Himitsu no Ike! Mizugorō Ga Ippai!?" (Japanese: 秘密の池! ミズゴロウがいっぱい!?)	May 15, 2003	March 13, 2004
302	299	26	"Turning Over a Nuzleaf" (Attack of the Konohana Tribe!!); Transliteration: "Konohana-zoku no Shūgeki!!" (Japanese: コノハナ族の襲撃!!)	May 22, 2003	March 27, 2004
303	300	27	"A Three Team Scheme!" (Team Magma vs. Team Aqua! Secret Base Battle!); Transliteration: "Maguma-dan Tai Akua-dan! Himitsu Kichi no Tatakai!" (Japanese: マグマ団VSアクア団! ひみつきちの戦い!)	May 29, 2003	April 17, 2004
304	301	28	"Seeing is Believing!" (Agehunt and Dokucale! The Final Evolution!); Transliteration: "Agehanto to Dokukeiru! Shinka no Hate ni!" (Japanese: アゲハントとドクケイル! 進化の果てに!)	June 5, 2003	April 24, 2004
305	302	29	"Ready, Willing and Sableye" (The Startling Yamirami!); Transliteration: "Yamirami de Tokkiri!" (Japanese: ヤミラミでドッキリ!)	June 12, 2003	May 1, 2004
306	303	30	"A Meditite Fight!" (Asanan and the Battle Girl! In the Middle of a Storm!); Transliteration: "Batoru Gāru to Asanan! Arashi no Naka de!" (Japanese: バトルガールとアサナン! 嵐の中で!)	June 19, 2003	May 8, 2004
307	304	31	"Just One of the Geysers" (Muro Gym Rematch! Surfing Battlefield!); Transliteration: "Muro Jimu Saisen! Naminori Batoru Fīrudo!" (Japanese: ムロジム再戦! 波乗りバトルフィールド!)	June 26, 2003	May 15, 2004
308	305	32	"Abandon Ship!" (The Abandoned Ship! The Creeping Shadow!!); Transliteration: "Suterare Fune! Shinobiyoru Kage!!" (Japanese: すてられ船! しのびよる影!!)	July 3, 2003	May 15, 2004
309	306	33	"Now That's Flower Power!" (A New Rival for Haruka! Intensive Pokémon Contest Training!!); Transliteration: "Haruka ni Raibaru! Tokkun Pokemon Kontesuto!!" (Japanese: ハルカにライバル! 特訓ポケモンコンテスト!!)	July 10, 2003	May 22, 2004
310	307	34	"Having a Wailord of a Time" (The Big Starter Pokémon Panic!!); Transliteration: "Hajimete no Pokemon de Dai Panikku!!" (Japanese: はじめてのポケモンで大パニック!!)	July 17, 2003	May 22, 2004
311	308	35	"Win, Lose or Drew!" (Haruka! The First Pokémon Contest Challenge!!); Transliteration: "Haruka! Pokemon Kontesuto Hatsu Chōsen!!" (Japanese: ハルカ! ポケモンコンテスト初挑戦!!)	July 24, 2003	May 29, 2004
312	309	36	"The Spheal of Approval" (Protect the Ocean Museum! Attack of Team Magma!!); Transliteration: "Umi no Hakubutsukan o Mamore! Maguma-dan no Shūgeki!!" (Japanese: 海の博物館を守れ! マグマ団の襲撃!!)	July 31, 2003	May 29, 2004
313	310	37	"Jump for Joy!" (Beauty and the Beast!? Dirteng and Nurse Joy!); Transliteration: "Bijo to Yajū!? Dātengu to Jōi-san!" (Japanese: 美女と野獣!? ダーテングとジョーイさん!)	August 7, 2003	August 28, 2004
314	311	38	"A Different Kind of Misty" (Prasle and Minun! The Mountain Lighthouse!!); Transliteration: "Purasuru to Mainan! Yama no Tōdai!!" (Japanese: プラスルとマイナン! 山の灯台!!)	August 14, 2003	August 28, 2004
315	312	39	"A Poké-BLOCK Party" (Sing! Pokémon Trick House!!); Transliteration: "Utau! Pokemon Karakuri Yashiki!!" (Japanese: 歌う! ポケモンからくり屋敷!!)	August 21, 2003	September 4, 2004
316	313	40	"Watt's with Wattson" (Kinsetsu Gym! Tessen's Electric Shock Battle!!); Transliteration: "Kinsetsu Jimu! Tessen no Dengeki Batoru!!" (Japanese: キンセツジム! テッセンの電撃バトル!!)	August 28, 2003	September 4, 2004

=== Season 7: Advanced Challenge (2003–04) ===
Jap. overall	Eng. overall	No. in season	English title Japanese title	Original release date	English air date
317	314	1	"What You Seed is What You Get" (Kimori's New Technique!! Watermelon Field's Seed Machine Gun!); Transliteration: "Kimori no Shinwaza!! Suika Hatake no Tane Mashingan!" (Japanese: キモリの新技！！スイカ畑のタネマシンガン！)	September 4, 2003	September 11, 2004
318	315	2	"Love at First Flight" (Barubeat and Illumise! Dance of Love!); Transliteration: "Barubīto to Irumīze! Ai no Dansu!" (Japanese: バルビートとイルミーゼ！愛のダンス！)	September 11, 2003	October 16, 2004
319	316	3	"Let Bagons Be Bagons" (Fly Tatsubay! Towards the Future!!); Transliteration: "Tobe, Tatsubei! Ashita ni Mukatte!!" (Japanese: 飛べ、タツベイ！明日にむかって！！)	September 18, 2003	September 18, 2004
320	317	4	"The Princess and the Togepi" (Kasumi Appears! Togepi and the Mirage Kingdom!); Transliteration: "Kasumi Tōjō! Togepī to Maboroshi no Ōkoku!" (Japanese: カスミ登場！トゲピーとまぼろしの王国！)	September 25, 2003	September 25, 2004
321	318	5	"A Togepi Mirage!" (Beyond the Mirage! Togepi's Paradise!); Transliteration: "Shinkirō no Kanata ni! Togepī no Rakuen!" (Japanese: 蜃気楼の彼方に！トゲピーの楽園！)	October 2, 2003	October 2, 2004
322	319	6	"Candid Camerupt!" (Kachinuki Family! 4 vs. 4!!); Transliteration: "Kachinuki Famirī! Yon Tai Yon!!" (Japanese: かちぬきファミリー！4VS4！！)	October 9, 2003	October 9, 2004
323	320	7	"I Feel Skitty!" (Eneko and Aromatherapy!); Transliteration: "Eneko to Aromaterapī!" (Japanese: エネコとアロマテラピー！)	October 16, 2003	October 23, 2004
324	321	8	"ZigZag Zangoose!" (Zangoose vs. Habunake! Rivals Showdown!!); Transliteration: "Zangūsu Tai Habunēku! Raibaru Taiketsu!!" (Japanese: ザングースVSハブネーク！ライバル対決！！)	October 23, 2003	October 23, 2004
325	322	9	"Maxxed Out!" (Masato and Masato! Protect Ametama!); Transliteration: "Masato to Masato! Ametama o Mamore!" (Japanese: マサトとマサト！アメタマを守れ！)	October 30, 2003	October 30, 2004
326	323	10	"Pros and Con Artists" (Pokémon Contest – Hajitsuge Tournament!!); Transliteration: "Pokemon Kontesuto, Hajitsuge Taikai!!" (Japanese: ポケモンコンテスト・ハジツゲ大会！！)	November 6, 2003	October 30, 2004
327	324	11	"Come What May!" (VS Charem! Contest Battle!!); Transliteration: "VS Chāremu! Kontesuto Batoru!!" (Japanese: VSチャーレム！コンテストバトル！！)	November 13, 2003	November 6, 2004
328	325	12	"Cheer Pressure" (Prasle and Minun! Road of Cheering!?); Transliteration: "Purasuru to Mainan! Ōen no Michi!?" (Japanese: プラスルとマイナン！応援の道！？)	November 20, 2003	November 6, 2004
329	326	13	"Game Winning Assist" (Eneco and Cat's Paw! Meadow of Donmel!); Transliteration: "Eneko to Neko no te! Donmeru no Bokujō!" (Japanese: エネコとねこのて！ドンメルの牧場！)	November 27, 2003	November 13, 2004
330	327	14	"Fight for the Meteorite" (Team Aqua vs. Team Magma Again! Battle of Mt. Chimney!!); Transliteration: "Maguma-dan Tai Akua-dan, Futatabi! Entotsu Yama no Tatakai!!" (Japanese: マグマ団VSアクア団、再び！えんとつ山の戦い！！)	December 4, 2003	November 13, 2004
331	328	15	"Poetry Commotion!" (The New Gym Leader – Asuna! The Hole-Filled Battlefield!); Transliteration: "Shinjin Jimu Rīdā, Asuna! Anadarake no Batoru Fīrudo!" (Japanese: 新人ジムリーダー・アスナ！穴だらけのバトルフィールド！)	December 11, 2003	November 20, 2004
332	329	16	"Going, Going, Yawn" (Heat Badge! Win the Blazing Battle!!); Transliteration: "Hīto Bajji! Moeru Batoru de Getto da ze!!" (Japanese: ヒートバッジ！燃えるバトルでゲットだぜ！！)	December 18, 2003	November 20, 2004
333	330	17	"Going for a Spinda" (Full of Patcheel! Beyond the Mountains in Search of Happiness!); Transliteration: "Patchīru Ga Ippai! Shiawase Sagashite Yama no Kanata ni!" (Japanese: パッチールがいっぱい！幸せさがして山の彼方に！)	December 25, 2003	November 27, 2004
334	331	18	"All Torkoal, No Play" (Breakthrough Valley of Steel! Cotoise vs. Haganeil!!); Transliteration: "Hagane no Tani o Toppa se yo! Kōtasu Tai Haganēru!!" (Japanese: ハガネの谷を突破せよ！コータスVSハガネール！！)	January 8, 2004	November 27, 2004
335	332	19	"Manectric Charge" (Kinetsu Gym Returns! Vs. Livolt!!); Transliteration: "Kinsetsu Jimu Futatabi! Tai Raiboruto!!" (Japanese: キンセツジムふたたび！VSライボルト！！)	January 15, 2004	December 4, 2004
336	333	20	"Delcatty Got Your Tongue" (Eneko and Enekororo! The Legendary Pokémon Coordinator Appears!!); Transliteration: "Eneko to Enekororo! Densetsu no Kōdeinētā Tōjō!!" (Japanese: エネコとエネコロロ！伝説のコーディネーター登場！！)	January 22, 2004	December 4, 2004
337	334	21	"Disaster of Disguise" (The Masked Coordinator – Phantom Appears!!); Transliteration: "Kamen no Kōdeinētā, Fantomu Tōjō!!" (Japanese: 仮面のコーディネーター・ファントム登場！！)	January 29, 2004	December 11, 2004
338	335	22	"Disguise Da Limit" (Shidake Town! Pokémon Contest!!); Transliteration: "Shidake Taun! Pokemon Kontesuto!!" (Japanese: シダケタウン！ポケモンコンテスト！！)	February 5, 2004	December 11, 2004
339	336	23	"Take the Lombre Home" (Solrock and Hasubrero! Legend of the Sacred Forest!); Transliteration: "Sorurokku to Hasuburero! Seinaru Mori no Densetsu!" (Japanese: ソルロックとハスブレロ！聖なる森の伝説！)	February 12, 2004	January 29, 2005
340	337	24	"True Blue Swablu" (Sky of Tyltto! Heart of Haruka!!); Transliteration: "Chirutto no Sora! Haruka no Kokoro!!" (Japanese: チルットの空！ハルカの心！！)	February 19, 2004	February 5, 2005
341	338	25	"Gulpin it Down" (The Great Gokulin Repelling Strategy!!); Transliteration: "Gokurin Gekitai Daisakusen!!" (Japanese: ゴクリン撃退大作戦！！)	February 26, 2004	February 12, 2005
342	339	26	"Exploud and Clear" (Critical Situation! Bakuong vs. Juptile!!); Transliteration: "Isshokusokuhatsu! Bakuongu Tai Juputoru!!" (Japanese: 一触即発！バクオングVSジュプトル！！)	March 4, 2004	February 19, 2005
343	340	27	"Go Go Ludicolo!" (Dancing Battle! Runpappa!!); Transliteration: "Odoru Batoru da! Runpappa!!" (Japanese: 踊るバトルだ！ルンパッパ！！)	March 11, 2004	February 26, 2005
344	341	28	"A Double Dilemma" (Papa is Idol!? Fake Gym Leader!!); Transliteration: "Papa wa Aidoru!? Itsuwari no Jimu Rīdā!!" (Japanese: パパはアイドル！？いつわりのジムリーダー！！)	March 18, 2004	March 5, 2005
345	342	29	"Love, Petalburg Style!" (Tōka Gym Crisis! Household Crisis!!); Transliteration: "Tōka Jimu no Kiki! Katei no Kiki!!" (Japanese: トウカジムの危機！家庭の危機！！)	March 25, 2004	March 12, 2005
346	343	30	"Balance of Power" (Tōka Gym! The Fifth Badge!!); Transliteration: "Tōka Jimu Sen! Itsutsu me no Bajji!!" (Japanese: トウカジム戦！五つ目のバッジ！！)	April 1, 2004	March 19, 2005
347	344	31	"A Six Pack Attack!" (Professor Ookido and Professor Odamaki! Secret Base Battle!!); Transliteration: "Ōkido-hakase to Odamaki-hakase! Himitsukichi no Tatakai!!" (Japanese: オーキド博士とオダマキ博士！秘密基地の戦い！！)	April 8, 2004	March 26, 2005
348	345	32	"The Bicker the Better" (Tag Battle! Satoshi vs. Haruka!?); Transliteration: "Taggu Batoru! Satoshi Tai Haruka!?" (Japanese: タッグバトル！サトシVSハルカ！？)	April 15, 2004	April 2, 2005
349	346	33	"Grass Hysteria!" (King of the Forbidden Forest! Fushigibana!!); Transliteration: "Kindan no Mori no Ōja! Fushigibana!!" (Japanese: 禁断の森の王者！フシギバナ！！)	April 22, 2004	April 9, 2005
350	347	34	"Hokey PokéBalls" (Fushigidane and Fushigidane! Regaining the Monster Balls!!); Transliteration: "Fushigidane to Fushigidane! Monsutā Bōru o Torikaese!!" (Japanese: フシギダネとフシギダネ！モンスターボールを取り返せ！！)	April 29, 2004	April 16, 2005
351	348	35	"Whiscash and Ash" (Showdown! The Fishing Master and the Giant Namazun!!); Transliteration: "Taiketsu! Kyodai Namazun to Tsuri Meijin!!" (Japanese: 対決！巨大ナマズンと釣り名人！！)	May 6, 2004	April 23, 2005
352	349	36	"Me, Myself and Time" (Yajilon and the Ruins in the Mist!); Transliteration: "Yajiron to Kiri no Naka no Iseki!" (Japanese: ヤジロンと霧の中の遺跡！)	May 13, 2004	April 30, 2005
353	350	37	"A Fan with a Plan" (Formidable Enemy!? Mother Coordinator Appears!); Transliteration: "Kyoōteki!? Mama-san Kōdeinētā Tōjō!" (Japanese: 強敵！？ママさんコーディネーター登場！)	May 20, 2004	May 7, 2005
354	351	38	"Cruisin' for a Losin'" (Pokémon Contest! Ruibosu Tournament!!); Transliteration: "Pokemon Kontesuto! Ruibosu Taikai!!" (Japanese: ポケモンコンテスト！ルイボス大会！！)	May 27, 2004	May 14, 2005
355	352	39	"Pearls are a Spoink's Best Friend" (Baneboo's Lost Object!?); Transliteration: "Banebū no Sagashimono!?" (Japanese: バネブーのさがしもの！？)	June 3, 2004	May 21, 2005
356	353	40	"That's Just Swellow" (Beginning Challenge! Sky Match – PokéRinger!!); Transliteration: "Hatsu Chōsen! Kūchū Kyōgi, Pokeringa!!" (Japanese: 初挑戦！空中競技・ポケリンガ！！)	June 10, 2004	May 28, 2005
357	354	41	"Take This House and Shuppet" (The Mansion of Kagebouzu!); Transliteration: "Kagebōzu no Kan!" (Japanese: カゲボウズの館！)	June 17, 2004	June 4, 2005
358	355	42	"A Shroomish Skirmish" (The Fighting King of the Forest!? Wakasyamo vs. Kinogassa!); Transliteration: "Mori no Kakutō Ō!? Wakashamo Tai Kinogassa!" (Japanese: 森の格闘王！？ワカシャモVSキノガッサ！)	June 24, 2004	June 11, 2005
359	356	43	"Unfair-Weather Friends" (Powalen of the Weather Research Institute!); Transliteration: "Otenki Kenkyūsho no Powarun!" (Japanese: お天気研究所のポワルン！)	July 1, 2004	June 18, 2005
360	357	44	"Who's Flying Now?" (Hiwamaki City's Feather Carnival!!); Transliteration: "Hiwamaki Shiti no Fezā Kānibaru!!" (Japanese: ヒワマキシティのフェザーカーニバル！！)	July 8, 2004	June 25, 2005
361	358	45	"Sky High Gym Battle!" (Hiwamaki Gym! Battle in the Sky!!); Transliteration: "Hiwamaki Jimu! Ōzora no Tatakai!!" (Japanese: ヒワマキジム！大空の戦い！！)	July 15, 2004	July 9, 2005
362	359	46	"Lights, Camerupt, Action!" (The Film's Riding on Bakuuda!!); Transliteration: "Eiga wa Bakūda ni Notte!!" (Japanese: 映画はバクーダに乗って！！)	July 22, 2004	July 16, 2005
363	360	47	"Crazy as a Lunatone" (Mystery! A Pokémon from Space!?); Transliteration: "Shinpi! Uchū kara Kita Pokemon!?" (Japanese: 神秘！宇宙から来たポケモン！？)	July 29, 2004	August 20, 2005
364	361	48	"The Garden of Eatin'" (Kabigon of the Banana Namakero Park!!); Transliteration: "Banana Namakero en no Kabigon!!" (Japanese: バナナナマケロ園のカビゴン！！)	August 5, 2004	August 27, 2005
365	362	49	"A Scare to Remember" (Pikachu, Joining Team Rocket!?); Transliteration: "Pikachū, Roketto-dan ni Iru!?" (Japanese: ピカチュウ、ロケット団に入る！？)	August 12, 2004	September 3, 2005
366	363	50	"Pokéblock, Stock, and Berry" (Arrival in Minamo City! Polocks and Swallow's Return!); Transliteration: "Minamo Shiti Tōchaku! Porokku to Tsubamegaeshi!" (Japanese: ミナモシティ到着！ポロックとつばめがえし！)	August 19, 2004	September 3, 2005
367	364	51	"Lessons in Lilycove" (Pokémon Contest! Minamo Tournament!!); Transliteration: "Pokemon Kontesuto! Minamo Taikai!!" (Japanese: ポケモンコンテスト！ミナモ大会！！)	August 26, 2004	September 10, 2005
368	365	52	"Judgment Day!" (Those Three Appear! The Referee School Island!); Transliteration: "Ano Sanbiki Tōjō! Shinpan Gakkō no Shima!" (Japanese: あの三匹登場！審判学校の島！)	September 2, 2004	September 10, 2005

=== Season 8: Advanced Battle (2004–05) ===
Jap. overall	Eng. overall	No. in season	English title Japanese title	Original release date	English air date
369	366	1	"Clamperl of Wisdom" (Pearlulu and Baneboo! Seek the Pearl!); Transliteration: "Pāruru to Banebū! Shinju o Sagase!" (Japanese: パールルとバネブー！しんじゅをさがせ！)	September 9, 2004	September 17, 2005
370	367	2	"The Relicanth Really Can" (Glanth and the Deep Sea Treasure!); Transliteration: "Jīransu to Shinkai no Hihō!" (Japanese: ジーランスと深海の秘宝！)	September 16, 2004	September 24, 2005
371	368	3	"The Evolutionary War" (Huntail and Sakurabyss! Mystery of Evolution!); Transliteration: "Hantēru to Sakurabisu! Shinka no Nazo!" (Japanese: ハンテールとサクラビス！進化の謎！)	September 23, 2004	October 1, 2005
372	369	4	"Training Wrecks" (Muscle Battle!? Double Battle!!); Transliteration: "Kinniku Batoru!? Daburu Batoru!!" (Japanese: 筋肉バトル！？ダブルバトル！！)	September 30, 2004	October 8, 2005
373	370	5	"Gaining Groudon" (Groudon vs. Kyogre [Part 1]); Transliteration: "Gurādon Tai Kaiōga! (Zenpen)" (Japanese: グラードンVSカイオーガ! （前編）)	October 7, 2004	October 15, 2005
374	371	6	"The Scuffle of Legends" (Groudon vs. Kyogre [Part 2]); Transliteration: "Gurādon Tai Kaiōga! (Kōhen)" (Japanese: グラードンVSカイオーガ! （後編）)	October 14, 2004	October 22, 2005
375	372	7	"It's Still Rocket Roll to Me" (Fuu and Ran! Space Center Battle!); Transliteration: "Fū to Ran! Uchū Senta no Tatakai!" (Japanese: フウとラン！宇宙センターの戦い！)	October 21, 2004	October 29, 2005
376	373	8	"Solid as a Solrock" (Tokusane Gym! Solrock and Lunatone!); Transliteration: "Tokusane Jimu! Sorurokku to Runatōn!" (Japanese: トクサネジム！ソルロックとルナトーン！)	October 28, 2004	November 5, 2005
N/A	N/A	N/A	Shaking Island Battle! Dojoach vs. Namazun!! Transliteration: "Yureru Shima no Tatakai! Dojotchi Tai Namazun!!" (Japanese: ゆれる島の戦い！ドジョッチVSナマズン！！)	N/A (Note: This episode was originally scheduled to air in Japan on November 4, 2004, but it was originally postponed due to the 2004 Chūetsu earthquake a week earlier. The episode was never aired in Japan or for international audiences.)	N/A
377	374	9	"Vanity Affair" (Seaman! Elite Four Genji Appears!!); Transliteration: "Umi no Otoko! Shitennō Genji Tōjō!!" (Japanese: 海の男！四天王ゲンジ登場！！)	November 4, 2004	November 12, 2005
378	375	10	"Where's Armaldo?" (Island of Dr. Moroboshi! Fossil Pokémon Appear!!); Transliteration: "Dokutā Moroboshi no Shima! Kaseki Pokemon Arawareru!!" (Japanese: ドクター・モロボシの島！化石ポケモン現る！！)	November 11, 2004	November 19, 2005
379	376	11	"A Cacturne for the Worse" (Izabe Island Pokémon Contest! Beware of the Rival!!); Transliteration: "Izabe Shima Pokemon Kontesuto! Ribaru Nikio Tsukero!!" (Japanese: イザベ島ポケモンコンテスト！ライバルに気をつけろ！！)	November 18, 2004	November 26, 2005
380	377	12	"Claydol Big and Tall" (Sealed the Huge Nendoll!!); Transliteration: "Kyodai Nendōru o Fūin se yo!!" (Japanese: 巨大ネンドールを封印せよ！！)	November 25, 2004	December 3, 2005
381	378	13	"Once in a Mawile" (Falling in Love with Kucheat! Hasubrero's Flower Arrangement!!); Transliteration: "Koi Suru Kuchīto! Hasuburero no Hanamichi!!" (Japanese: 恋するクチート！ハスブレロの花道！！)	December 2, 2004	December 10, 2005
382	379	14	"Beg, Burrow and Steal" (Nuckrar and Vibrava! Lake of Illusion!!); Transliteration: "Nakkurā to Biburāba! Maboroshi no Mizuumi!!" (Japanese: ナックラーとビブラーバ！幻の湖！！)	December 9, 2004	December 17, 2005
383	380	15	"Absol-ute Disaster" (Absol! Creeping Shadow of Disaster); Transliteration: "Abusoru! Shinobi Yoru Wazawai no Kage" (Japanese: アブソル！忍び寄るわざわいの影)	December 16, 2004	January 7, 2006
384	381	16	"Let it Snow, Let it Snow, Let it Snorunt" (Catch Yukiwarashi!); Transliteration: "Yukiwarashi o Tsukamaero!" (Japanese: ユキワラシをつかまえろ！)	December 23, 2004	January 14, 2006
385	382	17	"Do I Hear a Ralts?" (Rescue Ralts! Rush Masato!); Transliteration: "Rarutosu o Sukue! Isoge Masato!" (Japanese: ラルトスを救え！急げマサト！)	January 6, 2005	January 21, 2006
386	383	18	"The Great Eight Fate!" (Rune Gym! Artist of Water – Adan! [Part 1]); Transliteration: "Rune Jimu! Mizu no Ātisuto, Adan! (Zenpen)" (Japanese: ルネジム！水のアーティスト・アダン！（前編）)	January 13, 2005	January 28, 2006
387	384	19	"Eight Ain't Enough" (Rune Gym! Artist of Water – Adan! [Part 2]); Transliteration: "Rune Jimu! Mizu no Ātisuto, Adan! (Kōhen)" (Japanese: ルネジム！水のアーティスト・アダン！（後編）)	January 20, 2005	January 28, 2006
388	385	20	"Showdown at Linoone" (Massaguma! The Shape of Friendship!?); Transliteration: "Massuguma! Yūjō no Katachi!?" (Japanese: マッスグマ！友情のカタチ！？)	January 27, 2005	February 4, 2006
389	386	21	"Who, What, When, Where, Wynaut?" (Sohnano of Illusion Island!); Transliteration: "Maboroshi Shima no Sōnano!" (Japanese: まぼろし島のソーナノ！)	February 3, 2005	February 4, 2006
390	387	22	"Date Expectations" (Rollout! Loving Donfan!); Transliteration: "Korogare! Koi Suru Donfan!" (Japanese: ころがれ！恋するドンファン！)	February 10, 2005	February 11, 2006
391	388	23	"Mean with Envy" (Disorderly Melee! Pokémon Contest – Kinagi Tournament! [Part 1]); Transliteration: "Konsen, Konran! Pokemon Kontesuto, Kinagi Taikai! (Zenpen)" (Japanese: 混戦、混乱！ポケモンコンテスト・キナギ大会！（前編）)	February 17, 2005	February 11, 2006
392	389	24	"Pacifidlog Jam" (Disorderly Melee! Pokémon Contest – Kinagi Tournament! [Part 2]); Transliteration: "Konsen, Konran! Pokemon Kontesuto, Kinagi Taikai! (Kōhen)" (Japanese: 混戦、混乱！ポケモンコンテスト・キナギ大会！（後編）)	February 24, 2005	February 18, 2006
393	390	25	"Berry, Berry Interesting" (Get Gonbe with Haruka Delicious!!); Transliteration: "Haruka Derishasu de, Gonbe Getto kamo!!" (Japanese: ハルカデリシャスで、ゴンベGETかも！！)	March 3, 2005	February 25, 2006
394	391	26	"Less is Morrison" (The Rivals Appears! Masamune and the Dumbber!!); Transliteration: "Raibaru Tōjō! Masamune to Danbaru!!" (Japanese: ライバル登場！マサムネとダンバル！！)	March 10, 2005	February 25, 2006
395	392	27	"The Ribbon Cup Caper!" (Mysterious Thief Bannai and the Ribbon Cup!!); Transliteration: "Kaitō Bannai to Ribon Kappu!!" (Japanese: 怪盗バンナイとリボンカップ！！)	March 17, 2005	March 4, 2006
396	—	28	Satoshi and Haruka! Heated Battles in Hoenn!! Transliteration: "Satoshi to Haruka! Hōen de no Atsuki Batoru!!" (Japanese: サトシとハルカ！ホウエンでの熱きバトル！！)	March 24, 2005 (Note: This episode was never broadcast in the United States.)	—
397	393	29	"Hi Ho Silver Wind!" (Begin! Grand Festival [1]!!); Transliteration: "Kaimaku! Gurando Fesutibaru, Wan!!" (Japanese: 開幕！グランドフェスティバル①！！)	April 7, 2005	March 4, 2006
398	394	30	"Deceit and Assist" (Fierce Fighting! Grand Festival [2]!!); Transliteration: "Nettō! Gurando Fesutibaru, Tsū!!" (Japanese: 熱闘！グランドフェスティバル②！！)	April 7, 2005	March 11, 2006
399	395	31	"Rhapsody in Drew" (Deciding Match! Grand Festival [3]!!); Transliteration: "Kessen! Gurando Fesutibaru, Surī!!" (Japanese: 決戦！グランドフェスティバル③！！)	April 7, 2005	March 11, 2006
400	396	32	"Island Time" (Let's Go with Survival!); Transliteration: "Sabaibaru de Ikō!" (Japanese: サバイバルでいこう！)	April 14, 2005	March 18, 2006
401	397	33	"Like a Meowth to a Flame" (Arrival in Saiyū City! Nyarth in Boots!?); Transliteration: "Saiyū Shiti Tōchaku! Nagagutsu o Haita Nyāsu!?" (Japanese: サイユウシティ到着！長靴をはいたニャース！？)	April 21, 2005	March 18, 2006
402	398	34	"Saved by the Beldum" (Start the Preliminaries! Masamune Appears!!); Transliteration: "Yobisen Sutāto! Masamune Tōjō!!" (Japanese: 予備選スタート！マサムネ登場!!)	April 28, 2005	March 25, 2006
403	399	35	"From Brags to Riches" (Begin! Saiyū Tournament!!); Transliteration: "Kaimaku! Saiyū Taikai!!" (Japanese: 開幕！サイユウ大会！！)	May 5, 2005	March 25, 2006
404	400	36	"Shocks and Bonds" (Towards the Tournament Finals! Everyday a Heated Battle!); Transliteration: "Kesshō Tōnamento e! Atsuki Tatakai no Hibi!" (Japanese: 決勝トーナメントへ！熱き戦いの日々！)	May 12, 2005	April 1, 2006
405	401	37	"A Judgment Brawl" (And... Continue the Battle That Cannot Be Lost!!); Transliteration: "Soshite... Makerarenai Tatakai wa Tsuzuku!!" (Japanese: そして…負けられない戦いは続く！！)	May 19, 2005	April 1, 2006
406	402	38	"Choose It or Lose It!" (Rival Showdown! Vs. Masamune!); Transliteration: "Raibaru Taiketsu! Tai Masamune!" (Japanese: ライバル対決！VSマサムネ！)	May 26, 2005	April 8, 2006
407	403	39	"At the End of the Fray" (The Last Fierce Fighting! The Road to the Championship!!); Transliteration: "Saigo no Gekitō! Yūshō e no Michi!!" (Japanese: 最後の激闘！優勝への道！！)	June 16, 2005	April 8, 2006
408	404	40	"The Scheme Team" (Enishida and the Battle Frontier!); Transliteration: "Enishida to Batoru Furonteia!" (Japanese: エニシダとバトルフロンティア！)	June 23, 2005	April 15, 2006
409	405	41	"The Right Place and the Right Mime" (Ookido's Laboratory! Everybody Gather!!); Transliteration: "Ōkido Kenkyūsho! Zen'in Shūgō!!" (Japanese: オーキド研究所！全員集合！！)	June 30, 2005	April 22, 2006
410	406	42	"A Real Cleffa Hanger" (Mt. Otsukimi! With Py, Pippi and Pixy!); Transliteration: "Otsuki Miyama! Pii to Pippi to Pikushī to!" (Japanese: おつきみやま！ピィとピッピとピクシーと！)	July 7, 2005	April 22, 2006
411	407	43	"Numero Uno Articuno" (First Battle! Battle Factory!! [Part 1]); Transliteration: "Uijin! Batoru Fakutorī!! (Zenpen)" (Japanese: 初陣！バトルファクトリー！！（前編）)	July 21, 2005	April 29, 2006
412	408	44	"The Symbol Life" (First Battle! Battle Factory [Part 2]); Transliteration: "Uijin! Batoru Fakutorī!! (Kōhen)" (Japanese: 初陣！バトルファクトリー！！（後編）)	July 28, 2005	April 29, 2006
413	409	45	"Hooked on Onix" (The Kingdom of Iwark!!); Transliteration: "Iwāku no Ōkoku!!" (Japanese: イワークの王国！！)	August 4, 2005	May 6, 2006
414	410	46	"Rough, Tough Jigglypuff" (Purin's Song, Papa's Song!); Transliteration: "Purin no Uta, Papa no Uta!" (Japanese: プリンの歌、パパの歌！)	August 11, 2005	May 13, 2006
415	411	47	"On Cloud Arcanine" (Rival Showdown! Get Windie!); Transliteration: "Raibaru Taiketsu! Uindi o Getto Kamo!" (Japanese: ライバル対決！ウインディをゲットかも！)	August 18, 2005	May 20, 2006
416	412	48	"Sitting Psyduck" (Koduck's Depression!); Transliteration: "Kodakku no Yūutsu!" (Japanese: コダックの憂鬱！)	August 25, 2005	May 27, 2006
417	413	49	"Hail to the Chef!" (Nyula and Barrierd! Whose Restaurant!?); Transliteration: "Nyūra to Bariyādo! Dotchi no Resutoran!?" (Japanese: ニューラとバリヤード！どっちのレストラン！？)	September 1, 2005	June 10, 2006
418	414	50	"Caterpie's Big Dilemma" (Evolution! That Mystery and Wonder!!); Transliteration: "Shinka! Sono Shinpi to Kiseki!!" (Japanese: 進化！その神秘と奇跡！！)	September 8, 2005	June 17, 2006
419	415	51	"The Saffron Con" (Pokémon Contest – Yamabuki Tournament!! [Part 1]); Transliteration: "Pokemon Kontesuto, Yamabuki Taikai!! (Zenpen)" (Japanese: ポケモンコンテスト・ヤマブキ大会！！（前編）)	September 15, 2005	June 24, 2006
420	416	52	"A Hurdle for Squirtle" (Pokémon Contest – Yamabuki Tournament!! [Part 2]); Transliteration: "Pokemon Kontesuto, Yamabuki Taikai!! (Kōhen)" (Japanese: ポケモンコンテスト・ヤマブキ大会！！（後編）)	September 22, 2005	July 1, 2006
421	417	53	"Pasta La Vista!" (Fighting Dojo! Satoshi vs. Haruka!); Transliteration: "Kakutō Dōjō! Satoshi Tai Haruka!" (Japanese: 格闘道場！サトシVSハルカ！)	September 29, 2005	July 8, 2006

=== Season 9: Battle Frontier (2005–06) ===
Jap. overall	Eng. overall	No. in season	English title Japanese title	Original release date	English air date
422	418	1	"Fear Factor Phony" (Esper vs. Ghost! Midnight Duel!?); Transliteration: "Esupā Tai Gōsuto! Mayonaka no Kettō!?" (Japanese: エスパーVSゴースト！真夜中の決闘！？)	October 6, 2005	September 9, 2006
423	419	2	"Sweet Baby James" (Manene Appears! Mansion of Rest!); Transliteration: "Manene Tōjō! Kyūsoku no Yakata!" (Japanese: マネネ登場！休息の館！)	October 13, 2005	September 9, 2006
424	420	3	"A Chip Off the Old Brock" (Mizugorou and Mokoko! Wonder Drug of Love!?); Transliteration: "Mizugorō to Mokoko! Koi no Tokkōyaku!?" (Japanese: ミズゴロウとモココ！恋の特効薬！？)	October 20, 2005	September 16, 2006
425	421	4	"Wheel of Frontier" (Battle Arena! Fighting Showdown!!); Transliteration: "Batoru Arīna! Kakutō Taiketsu!!" (Japanese: バトルアリーナ！格闘対決！！)	October 27, 2005	September 16, 2006
426	422	5	"May's Egg-cellent Adventure!" (The Breeding Center and the Pokémon Egg!); Transliteration: "Sodateyasan to Pokemon no Tamago!" (Japanese: そだて屋さんとポケモンのタマゴ！)	November 3, 2005	September 23, 2006
427	423	6	"Weekend Warrior" (The Rival is a Salaryman!?); Transliteration: "Raibaru wa Sararīman!?" (Japanese: ライバルはサラリーマン！？)	November 10, 2005	September 23, 2006
428	424	7	"On Olden Pond" (The Lake of Hakuryu!); Transliteration: "Hakuryū no Mizuumi!" (Japanese: ハクリューの湖！)	November 17, 2005	September 30, 2006
429	425	8	"Tactics Theatrics!!" (Battle Dome! Fusion of Fire and Water!!); Transliteration: "Batoru Dōmu! Honō to Mizu no Fyūjon!!" (Japanese: バトルドーム！炎と水のフュージョン！！)	November 24, 2005	September 30, 2006
430	426	9	"Reversing the Charges" (Startling! Frightening! Elekid!!); Transliteration: "Dokkiri! Bikkuri! Erekiddo!!" (Japanese: ドッキリ！ビックリ！エレキッド！！)	December 1, 2005	October 7, 2006
431	427	10	"The Green Guardian" (Pokémon Ranger Appears! Celebi Rescue Operation!!); Transliteration: "Pokemon Renjā Tōjō! Serebyi Kyūshutsu Sakusen!!" (Japanese: ポケモンレンジャー登場！セレビィ救出作戦！！)	December 8, 2005	October 7, 2006
432	428	11	"From Cradle to Save" (Usohachi and the Ninja School!!); Transliteration: "Usohachi to Ninja Sukūru!!" (Japanese: ウソハチと忍者スクール！！)	December 15, 2005	October 14, 2006
433	429	12	"Time-Warp Heals All Wounds" (Haruka Travels Through Time!!); Transliteration: "Toki o Koeru Haruka!!" (Japanese: 時を超えるハルカ！！)	December 22, 2005	October 14, 2006
434	430	13	"Queen of the Serpentine!" (Fierce Fighting at The Battle Tube! Vs. Tube Queen Azami!!); Transliteration: "Nettō Batoru Chūbu! Tai Chūbu Kuīn Azami!!" (Japanese: 熱闘バトルチューブ！VSチューブクイーン・アザミ！！)	January 5, 2006	October 21, 2006
435	431	14	"Off the Unbeaten Path" (Who Single Handedly Has the Victory!? Pokémon Orienteering!!); Transliteration: "Yūshō wa Dare no Te ni!? Pokemon Orientēringu!!" (Japanese: 優勝は誰の手に！？ポケモンオリエンテーリング！！)	January 12, 2006	October 21, 2006
436	432	15	"Harley Rides Again" (Gonbe's Battle Debut! Harley and Taking the Game Seriously!!); Transliteration: "Gonbe no Debyūsen! Hārī to Shinken Shōbu!!" (Japanese: ゴンベのデビュー戦！ハーリーと真剣勝負！！)	January 19, 2006	October 28, 2006
437	433	16	"Odd Pokémon Out!" (Juptile vs. Tropius! Grassland Duel!!); Transliteration: "Juputoru Tai Toropiusu! Sōgen no Kettō!!" (Japanese: ジュプトルVSトロピウス！草原の決闘！！)	January 26, 2006	October 28, 2006
438	434	17	"Spontaneous Combusken!" (Pokémon Contest! Yuzuriha Tournament!!); Transliteration: "Pokemon Kontesuto! Yuzuriha Taikai!!" (Japanese: ポケモンコンテスト！ユズリハ大会！！)	February 2, 2006	November 4, 2006
439	435	18	"Cutting the Ties That Bind!" (Jukain! Dawn of Revival!!); Transliteration: "Jukain! Fukkatsu no Yoake!!" (Japanese: ジュカイン！復活の夜明け！！)	February 9, 2006	November 4, 2006
440	436	19	"Ka Boom with a View!" (Fierce Fighting! Jungle Battle at the Battle Palace!!); Transliteration: "Gekitō! Batoru Paresu de Janguru Batoru!!" (Japanese: 激闘！バトルパレスでジャングルバトル！！)	February 16, 2006	November 10, 2006
441	437	20	"King and Queen for a Day!" (Usohachi King and Manene Queen!?); Transliteration: "Usohachi Kingu to Manene Kuīn!?" (Japanese: ウソハチキングとマネネクイーン！？)	February 23, 2006	November 10, 2006
442	438	21	"Curbing the Crimson Tide!" (The Red Lightning of Skyscrapers!); Transliteration: "Matenrō no Akai Inazuma!" (Japanese: 摩天楼の赤いイナズマ！)	March 2, 2006	November 18, 2006
443	439	22	"What I Did for Love!" (Decisive Game! Haruka vs. Takeshi!!); Transliteration: "Ōichiban! Haruka Tai Takeshi!!" (Japanese: 大一番！ハルカVSタケシ！！)	March 9, 2006	November 18, 2006
444	440	23	"Three Jynx and a Baby!" (Muchul and the Three Rougela Sisters!!); Transliteration: "Muchūru to Rūjura San-Shimai!!" (Japanese: ムチュールとルージュラ三姉妹！！)	March 16, 2006	November 25, 2006
445	441	24	"Talking a Good Game!" (Tower Tycoon, Lila Appears!); Transliteration: "Tawā Taikūn, Rira Tōjō!" (Japanese: タワータイクーン、リラ登場！)	March 23, 2006	November 25, 2006
446	442	25	"Second Time's the Charm!" (Battle Tower! Telepathy Battle!!); Transliteration: "Batoru Tawā! Ishindenshin Batoru!!" (Japanese: バトルタワー！以心伝心バトル！！)	March 30, 2006	November 27, 2006
447	443	26	"Pokémon Ranger - Deoxys' Crisis! Part 1" (Pokémon Ranger! Deoxys Crisis!! [Part 1]); Transliteration: "Pokemon Renjā! Deokishisu, Kuraishisu!! (Zenpen)" (Japanese: ポケモンレンジャー！デオキシス・クライシス！！（前編）)	April 13, 2006	October 28, 2006
448	444	27	"Pokémon Ranger - Deoxys' Crisis! Part 2" (Pokémon Ranger! Deoxys Crisis!! [Part 2]); Transliteration: "Pokemon Renjā! Deokishisu, Kuraishisu!! (Kōhen)" (Japanese: ポケモンレンジャー！デオキシス・クライシス！！（後編）)	April 13, 2006	October 28, 2006
449	445	28	"All That Glitters is Not Golden!" (Usokkie! Gold Legend!?); Transliteration: "Usokkī! Ōgon Densetsu!?" (Japanese: ウソッキー！黄金伝説！？)	April 20, 2006	November 28, 2006
450	446	29	"New Plot, Odd Lot!" (Harley & Team Rocket! The Formation of the Villainous Alliance!?); Transliteration: "Hārī ando Roketto-dan! Akuyaku Dōmei Kessei!?" (Japanese: ハーリー＆ロケット団！悪役同盟結成！？)	April 27, 2006	November 29, 2006
451	447	30	"Going for Choke!" (Haruka vs. Musashi! The Final Contest!); Transliteration: "Haruka Tai Musashi! Saigo no Kontesuto!!" (Japanese: ハルカVSムサシ！最後のコンテスト！！)	May 4, 2006	November 30, 2006
452	448	31	"The Ole' Berate and Switch!" (Team Rocket Breakup!? Respective Roads!); Transliteration: "Roketto-dan Kaisan!? Sorezore no Michi!" (Japanese: ロケット団解散！？それぞれの道！)	May 11, 2006	December 4, 2006
453	449	32	"Grating Spaces!" (Takeshi & Satoshi! Defend Nibi Gym in a Tag Battle!!); Transliteration: "Takeshi Ando Satoshi! Taggu Batoru de Nibi Jimu o Mamore!!" (Japanese: タケシ＆サトシ！タッグバトルでニビジムを守れ！！)	May 18, 2006	December 5, 2006
454	450	33	"Battling the Enemy Within!" (Battle Pyramid! Vs. Regirock!!); Transliteration: "Batoru Piramiddo! Tai Rejirokku!!" (Japanese: バトルピラミッド！VSレジロック！！)	May 25, 2006	December 6, 2006
455	451	34	"Slaking Kong!" (Miracle! Mountain of the Giant Kekking!!); Transliteration: "Kyōi! Kyodai Kekkingu no Yama!!" (Japanese: 驚異！巨大ケッキングの山！！)	June 8, 2006	December 7, 2006
456	452	35	"May, We Harley Drew'd Ya!" (Begin! Pokémon Contest – Grand Festival!!); Transliteration: "Kaimaku! Pokemon Kontesuto, Gurando Fesutibaru!!" (Japanese: 開幕！ポケモンコンテスト・グランドフェスティバル！！)	June 15, 2006	December 11, 2006
457	453	36	"Thinning the Hoard!" (Haruka vs. Harley! Stage On with a Double Battle!!); Transliteration: "Haruka Tai Hārī! Daburu Batoru de Sutēji On!!" (Japanese: ハルカVSハーリー！ダブルバトルでステージ・オン！！)	June 22, 2006	December 12, 2006
458	454	37	"Channeling the Battle Zone!" (Haruka vs. Shū! The Final Battle!); Transliteration: "Haruka Tai Shū! Saigo no Tatakai!!" (Japanese: ハルカVSシュウ！最後の戦い！！)	June 29, 2006	December 13, 2006
459	455	38	"Aipom and Circumstance!" (Aipom and the King!); Transliteration: "Eipamu to Ōsama!" (Japanese: エイパムと王様！)	July 6, 2006	December 14, 2006
460	456	39	"Strategy Tomorrow – Comedy Tonight!" (Perap and the Pokémon Comedian!); Transliteration: "Perappu to Pokemon Manzai!" (Japanese: ペラップとポケモン漫才！)	July 20, 2006	January 6, 2007
461	457	40	"Duels of the Jungle!" (Attack! The Stray Manyula!!); Transliteration: "Pshūgeki! Hagure Manyūra!!" (Japanese: 襲撃！はぐれマニューラ！！)	July 27, 2006	January 13, 2007
462	458	41	"Overjoyed!" (Battle Pyramid Again! Vs. Registeel!); Transliteration: "Batoru Piramiddo Futatabi! Tai Rejisuchiru!!" (Japanese: バトルピラミッド再び！VSレジスチル！！)	August 3, 2006	January 20, 2007
463	459	42	"The Unbeatable Lightness of Seeing!" (Haruka vs. Shū! Rivals Forever!!); Transliteration: "Haruka Tai Shū! Raibaru yo Eien ni!!" (Japanese: ハルカVSシュウ！ライバルよ永遠に！！)	August 10, 2006	January 27, 2007
464	460	43	"Pinch Healing!" (The Pokémon Center is Very Busy!); Transliteration: "Pokemon Sentā wa Ōisogashi!" (Japanese: ポケモンセンターはおおいそがし！)	August 17, 2006	February 3, 2007
465	461	44	"Gathering the Gang of Four!" (First Pokémon! The Final Battle!!); Transliteration: "Saisho no Pokemon! Saigo no Tatakai!!" (Japanese: 最初のポケモン！最後の戦い！！)	August 24, 2006	February 10, 2007
466	462	45	"Pace – The Final Frontier!" (Deciding Battle! Vs. Regice!!); Transliteration: "Kessen! Tai Rejiaisu!!" (Japanese: 決戦！VSレジアイス！！)	August 31, 2006	February 17, 2007
467	463	46	"Once More with Reeling!" (Satoshi vs. Haruka! The Last Battle!!); Transliteration: "Satoshi Tai Haruka! Rasuto Batoru!!" (Japanese: サトシVSハルカ！ラストバトル！！)	September 7, 2006	February 24, 2007
468	464	47	"Home is Where the Start Is!" (End of a Journey, Yet Beginning of a Journey!); Transliteration: "Tabi no Owari, Soshite Tabi no Hajimari!" (Japanese: 旅の終わり、そして旅の始まり！)	September 14, 2006	March 3, 2007

== Home media releases ==
=== DVD ===
Single releases (USA, Region 1) [VIZ Media]
Volume		Episodes	Release date
Season 1: Indigo League (1997–1999)	I Choose You! Pikachu!	1–3	December 13, 1998
Season 1: Indigo League (1997–1999)	The Mystery of Mount Moon	4–6	March 9, 1999
Season 1: Indigo League (1997–1999)	The Sisters of Cerulean City	7–9	March 9, 1999
Season 1: Indigo League (1997–1999)	Poké-Friends	10–12	May 18, 1999
Season 1: Indigo League (1997–1999)	Thunder Shock!	13–15	May 18, 1999
Season 1: Indigo League (1997–1999)	Seaside Pikachu	16–17, 19	July 20, 1999
Season 1: Indigo League (1997–1999)	Psychic Surprise	20–22	July 20, 1999
Season 1: Indigo League (1997–1999)	Primeape Problems	23–25	September 21, 1999
Season 1: Indigo League (1997–1999)	Fashion Victims	26–28	September 21, 1999
Season 1: Indigo League (1997–1999)	Fighting Tournament	29–31	September 21, 1999
Season 1: Indigo League (1997–1999)	The Great Race	32–34	November 23, 1999
Season 1: Indigo League (1997–1999)	Pikachu Party	36–37, 39	November 23, 1999
Season 1: Indigo League (1997–1999)	Wake Up Snorlax!	40–42	January 18, 2000
Season 1: Indigo League (1997–1999)	Jigglypuff Pop	43–45	January 18, 2000
Season 1: Indigo League (1997–1999)	Charizard!!	46–48	February 22, 2000
Season 1: Indigo League (1997–1999)	Totally Togepi	49–51	February 22, 2000
Season 1: Indigo League (1997–1999)	Picture Perfect	54–57	May 30, 2000
Season 1: Indigo League (1997–1999)	Water Blast!	58–60	May 30, 2000
Season 1: Indigo League (1997–1999)	Our Hero Meowth	52–53, 61	July 18, 2000
Season 1: Indigo League (1997–1999)	The Final Badge	62–64	July 18, 2000
Season 1: Indigo League (1997–1999)	The Po-Ké Corral!	65–67	September 19, 2000
Season 1: Indigo League (1997–1999)	Hang Ten, Pikachu	68–70	September 19, 2000
Season 1: Indigo League (1997–1999)	Show Time!	71–73	November 14, 2000
Season 1: Indigo League (1997–1999)	Into the Arena	74–76	November 14, 2000
Season 1: Indigo League (1997–1999)	ROUND ONE!	77–79	January 23, 2001
Season 1: Indigo League (1997–1999)	Friends & Rivals	80–82	January 23, 2001
Season 2: Adventures in the Orange Islands (1999)	Adventures On The Orange Islands 1	83–94	November 12, 2002
Season 2: Adventures in the Orange Islands (1999)	Adventures On The Orange Islands 2	95–106	September 23, 2003
Season 2: Adventures in the Orange Islands (1999)	Adventures On The Orange Islands 3	107–118	November 18, 2003
Season 3: The Johto Journeys (1999–2000)	A Brand New World	119–121	March 27, 2001
Season 3: The Johto Journeys (1999–2000)	Midnight Guardian	122–124	March 27, 2001
Season 3: The Johto Journeys (1999–2000)	Mission Spinarak	125–127	May 29, 2001
Season 3: The Johto Journeys (1999–2000)	Snow Rescue	128–130	May 29, 2001
Season 3: The Johto Journeys (1999–2000)	Flying Ace	131–133	July 31, 2001
Season 3: The Johto Journeys (1999–2000)	Fire Power	134–136	July 31, 2001
Season 3: The Johto Journeys (1999–2000)	Team Green!	137–139	September 25, 2001
Season 3: The Johto Journeys (1999–2000)	Crimson Warrior	140–142	September 25, 2001
Season 3: The Johto Journeys (1999–2000)	Azalea Adventures	143–145	November 27, 2001
Season 3: The Johto Journeys (1999–2000)	Buggy Boogie	146–148	November 27, 2001
Season 3: The Johto Journeys (1999–2000)	The Squirtle Squad	149–151	January 29, 2002
Season 3: The Johto Journeys (1999–2000)	Midnight Heroes	152–154	January 29, 2002
Season 3: The Johto Journeys (1999–2000)	Ursaring Rampage	155–157	March 26, 2002
Season 4: Johto League Champions (2000–01)	Journey to the Johto League Champion	160–166	December 10, 2002
Season 4: Johto League Champions (2000–01)	Road to the Johto League Champion	167–173	December 10, 2002
Season 4: Johto League Champions (2000–01)	Distance to the Johto League Champion	174–180	June 24, 2003
Season 4: Johto League Champions (2000–01)	Path to the Johto League Champion	181–187	August 26, 2003
Season 4: Johto League Champions (2000–01)	Way to the Johto League Champion	188–194	October 28, 2003
Season 4: Johto League Champions (2000–01)	Circuit to the Johto League Champion	195–201	December 2, 2003
Season 4: Johto League Champions (2000–01)	Journey's End	202–211	February 10, 2004
Season 6: Advanced (2002–03)	A Ruin with a View	277–281	July 20, 2004
Season 6: Advanced (2002–03)	Tree's a Crowd	282–286	July 20, 2004
Season 6: Advanced (2002–03)	A Bite to Remember	287–291	September 21, 2004
Season 6: Advanced (2002–03)	Stairway to Devon	292–296	September 21, 2004
Season 6: Advanced (2002–03)	A Hole Lotta Trouble	297–301	November 9, 2004
Season 6: Advanced (2002–03)	A Three Team Scheme	302–306	November 9, 2004
Season 6: Advanced (2002–03)	Abandon Ship	307–311	January 25, 2005
Season 6: Advanced (2002–03)	Jump for Joy	312–316	January 25, 2005
Season 7: Advanced Challenge (2003–04)	Love at First Flight	317–321	September 6, 2005
Season 7: Advanced Challenge (2003–04)	Maxxed Out!	322–326	September 6, 2005
Season 7: Advanced Challenge (2003–04)	Cheer Pressure	327–331	November 29, 2005
Season 7: Advanced Challenge (2003–04)	Manectric Charge	332–336	November 29, 2005
Season 7: Advanced Challenge (2003–04)	Take the Lombre Home	337–341	January 24, 2006
Season 7: Advanced Challenge (2003–04)	Go Go Ludicolo!	342–346	January 24, 2006
Season 7: Advanced Challenge (2003–04)	A Six Pack Attack	347–351	March 14, 2006
Season 7: Advanced Challenge (2003–04)	That's Just Swellow	352–356	March 14, 2006
Season 7: Advanced Challenge (2003–04)	Sky High Gym Battle!	357–362	May 9, 2006
Season 7: Advanced Challenge (2003–04)	Pokéblock, Stock, and Berry	363–368	May 9, 2006
Season 8: Advanced Battle (2004–05)	Gaining Groudon	369–373	September 19, 2006
Season 8: Advanced Battle (2004–05)	The Scuffle of Legends	374–378	September 19, 2006
Season 8: Advanced Battle (2004–05)	Absol-ute Disaster	379–383	November 7, 2006
Season 8: Advanced Battle (2004–05)	Eight Ain't Enough	384–388	November 7, 2006
Season 8: Advanced Battle (2004–05)	Berry, Berry Interesting!	389–393	January 9, 2007
Season 8: Advanced Battle (2004–05)	Deceit and Assist	394–395, 397–399	January 9, 2007
Season 8: Advanced Battle (2004–05)	Shocks and Bonds	400–404	March 6, 2007
Season 8: Advanced Battle (2004–05)	A Judgment Brawl	405–409	March 6, 2007
Season 8: Advanced Battle (2004–05)	Numero Uno Articuno	410–415	May 1, 2007
Season 8: Advanced Battle (2004–05)	Hail to the Chef!	416–421	May 1, 2007

Box Sets (USA, Region 1) [VIZ Media]
Volume			Episodes	Release date	Ref.
Season 1: Indigo League (1997–1999)	First Edition	Part 1: Episodes 1–26	1–17, 19–27	November 21, 2006	
Season 1: Indigo League (1997–1999)	First Edition	Part 2: Episodes 27–52	28–34, 36–37, 39–51, 54–57	November 13, 2007	
Season 1: Indigo League (1997–1999)	First Edition	Part 3: Episodes 53–79	52–53, 58–82	February 18, 2008	
Season 1: Indigo League (1997–1999)	Second Edition	Volume 1	1–17, 19–27	November 5, 2013	
Season 1: Indigo League (1997–1999)	Second Edition	Volume 2	28–34, 36–37, 39–51, 54–57	October 28, 2014	
Season 1: Indigo League (1997–1999)	Second Edition	Volume 3	52–53, 58–64, 66–82	October 28, 2014	
Season 1: Indigo League (1997–1999)	The Complete Collection		1–17, 19–34, 36–37, 39–64, 66–82	October 28, 2014	
Season 2: Adventures in the Orange Islands (1999)	Box Set		83–118	May 20, 2008	
Season 2: Adventures in the Orange Islands (1999)	The Complete Collection		83–91, 93–100, 102–118	May 5, 2015	
Season 3: The Johto Journeys (1999–2000)	The Complete Collection		119–159	November 10, 2015	
Season 4: Johto League Champions (2000–01)	The Complete Collection		160–211	May 31, 2016	
Season 5: Master Quest (2001–02)	Box Sets	Quest 1: Episodes 1–32	212–243	October 26, 2004	
Season 5: Master Quest (2001–02)	Box Sets	Quest 2: Episodes 33–64	244–251, 253–276	February 15, 2005	
Season 5: Master Quest (2001–02)	The Complete Collection		212–251, 253–276	October 11, 2016	
Season 6: Advanced (2002–03)	Box Sets	Volume 1	277–296	October 25, 2005	
Season 6: Advanced (2002–03)	Box Sets	Volume 2	297–316	August 22, 2006	
Season 6: Advanced (2002–03)	The Complete Collection		277–316	May 16, 2017	
Season 7: Advanced Challenge (2003–04)	The Complete Collection		317–368	December 5, 2017	
Season 8: Advanced Battle (2004–05)	The Complete Collection		369–395, 397–421	June 12, 2018	
Season 9: Battle Frontier (2005–06)	Box Sets	Volume 1: Episodes 1–24	422–445	June 24, 2008	
Season 9: Battle Frontier (2005–06)	Box Sets	Volume 2: Episodes 25–47	446–468	September 16, 2008	
Season 9: Battle Frontier (2005–06)	The Complete Collection		422–468	January 8, 2019	

== See also ==
- List of Pokémon episodes (seasons 10–19)
- List of Pokémon episodes (seasons 20–present)
