= Lists of Pokémon episodes =

Pokémon is a Japanese animated television series based on the Pokémon video game series published by Nintendo. The Pokémon anime series debuted in Japan on April 1, 1997, and as of 2026, the series has more than 1,300 episodes.

In countries such as the United States, the cross-platform Pokémon franchise was introduced through the animated TV series first, to prime the market for the video games. However, for various reasons, some episodes have been pulled from rerun rotation or went unaired in certain countries, while others were altered or completely banned.

== Series overview ==
Season	Season name	Episodes	Originally released	
Season	Season name	Episodes	First released	Last released
1	Indigo League	80	April 1, 1997	January 21, 1999
2	Adventures in the Orange Islands	36	January 28, 1999	October 7, 1999
3	The Johto Journeys	41	October 14, 1999	July 27, 2000
4	Johto League Champions	52	August 3, 2000	August 2, 2001
5	Master Quest	64	August 9, 2001	November 14, 2002
6	Advanced	40	November 21, 2002	August 28, 2003
7	Advanced Challenge	52	September 4, 2003	September 2, 2004
8	Advanced Battle	52	September 9, 2004	September 29, 2005
9	Battle Frontier	47	October 6, 2005	September 14, 2006
10	Diamond and Pearl	51	September 28, 2006	October 25, 2007
11	Diamond and Pearl: Battle Dimension	52	November 8, 2007	December 4, 2008
12	Diamond and Pearl: Galactic Battles	52	December 4, 2008	December 24, 2009
13	Diamond and Pearl: Sinnoh League Victors	34	January 7, 2010	September 9, 2010
14	Black & White	48	September 23, 2010	September 15, 2011
15	Black & White: Rival Destinies	49	September 22, 2011	October 4, 2012
16	Black & White: Adventures in Unova and Beyond	45	October 11, 2012	September 26, 2013
17	XY	48	October 17, 2013	October 30, 2014
18	XY: Kalos Quest	45	November 13, 2014	October 22, 2015
19	XYZ	48	October 29, 2015	October 27, 2016
20	Sun & Moon	43	November 17, 2016	September 21, 2017
21	Sun & Moon: Ultra Adventures	48	October 5, 2017	October 14, 2018
22	Sun & Moon: Ultra Legends	54	October 21, 2018	November 3, 2019
23	Journeys	48	November 17, 2019	December 4, 2020
24	Master Journeys	42	December 11, 2020	December 10, 2021
25	Ultimate Journeys	54	December 17, 2021	March 24, 2023
26	Horizons	45	April 14, 2023	March 29, 2024
27	Horizons – The Search for Laqua	44	April 12, 2024	March 21, 2025
28	Horizons – Rising Hope	47	April 11, 2025	May 1, 2026
29	Horizons – Wonders Ahead	15	May 22, 2026	TBA

== Episode list ==
=== Seasons 1–9 ===
- List of Pokémon episodes (seasons 1–9)
  - Pokémon: Indigo League
  - Pokémon: Adventures in the Orange Islands
  - Pokémon: The Johto Journeys
  - Pokémon: Johto League Champions
  - Pokémon: Master Quest
  - Pokémon: Advanced
  - Pokémon: Advanced Challenge
  - Pokémon: Advanced Battle
  - Pokémon: Battle Frontier

=== Seasons 10–19 ===
- List of Pokémon episodes (seasons 10–19)
  - Pokémon the Series: Diamond and Pearl
  - Pokémon: Diamond and Pearl: Battle Dimension
  - Pokémon: Diamond and Pearl: Galactic Battles
  - Pokémon: Diamond and Pearl: Sinnoh League Victors
  - Pokémon the Series: Black & White
  - Pokémon: Black & White: Rival Destinies
  - Pokémon: Black & White: Adventures in Unova and Beyond
  - Pokémon the Series: XY
  - Pokémon the Series: XY Kalos Quest
  - Pokémon the Series: XYZ

=== Seasons 20–present ===
- List of Pokémon episodes (seasons 20–present)
  - Pokémon the Series: Sun & Moon
  - Pokémon the Series: Sun & Moon – Ultra Adventures
  - Pokémon the Series: Sun & Moon – Ultra Legends
  - Pokémon Journeys: The Series
  - Pokémon Master Journeys: The Series
  - Pokémon Ultimate Journeys: The Series
  - Pokémon Horizons: The Series
  - Pokémon Horizons – The Search for Laqua
  - Pokémon Horizons – Rising Hope
  - Pokémon Horizons – Wonders Ahead

== See also ==
- Lists about Pokémon
