= Pokémon Horizons – The Search for Laqua =

2025 season of Pokémon Horizons

- Season 27 (overall); Season 2 (Horizons)
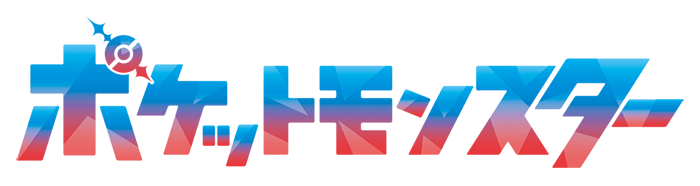
- Japanese logo for Pocket Monsters (top); Pokémon Horizons: Season 2 – The Search For Laqua international logo (bottom)
- No. of episodes: 44

Release
- Original network: TV Tokyo
- Original release: April 12, 2024 – March 21, 2025

Season chronology
- ← Previous; Horizons Next → Horizons – Rising Hope

Pokémon Horizons – The Search for Laqua, (Note: It is officially known as Pokémon Horizons: Season 2 — The Search for Laqua.) known in Japan as Pocket Monsters: Terastal Debut (Note: Japanese: ポケットモンスター: テラスタルデビュー, Hepburn: Poketto Monsutā: Terasutaru Debyū) and Pocket Monsters: Rayquaza Rising (Note: Japanese: ポケットモンスター: レックウザライジング, Hepburn: Poketto Monsutā: Rekkūza raijingu) is the twenty-seventh season of the Pokémon anime series and the second season of Pokémon Horizons: The Series, known in Japan as Pocket Monsters (ポケットモンスター, Poketto Monsutā). It was directed by Saori Den and produced by OLM. The season aired in Japan on TV Tokyo from April 12, 2024, to March 21, 2025, and was distributed by Netflix in the United States from February 7 to September 26, 2025.

The season comprises two story arcs. The first arc, "Terastal Debut", covering the first 22 episodes, follows protagonists Liko and Roy, alongside Dot, as they enroll at Naranja Academy in the Paldea region to learn about the Terastal phenomenon and battle Gym Leaders under Tera Training. The second arc, "Rayquaza Rising", covering the final 22 episodes, follows the Rising Volt Tacklers as they search for Lucius' remaining Six Heroes and eventually go on the path to Laqua.

== Episode list ==
Jap. overall	Eng. overall	No. in season	English title Japanese title	Directed by	Written by	Animation directed by	Original release date	English release date
1280	1269	1	"Welcome to Naranja Academy! (How Thrilling! Orange Academy)"; Transliteration: "Dokidoki! Orenji Akademī" (Japanese: ドキドキ！オレンジアカデミー)	Makoto Nakata	Dai Satō	Toshiko Nakaya, Yūhei Takaboshi, Izumi Shimura, Sakai Hiromi, Chiaki Kurakazu & Shūji Tanaka	April 12, 2024	January 13, 2025 (UK); February 7, 2025 (US)
Liko, along with Roy and Dot, enroll in a Terastal Training course at Naranja Academy to learn about the Terastal phenomenon in Paldea. They meet the Naranja Academy Director Clavell and the Top Champion and Paldea League Chairwoman Geeta, who introduce them to the curriculum involving Terastallization and battling Gym Leaders. During their tour, they encounter Champion-ranked Trainer Nemona, who Liko and Roy have met before, and members of the Elite Four. In their first class, they learn about their Gym Leader assignments. Liko also reunites and battles with her classmate Ann. As they prepare to leave, they encounter members of the Explorers posing as two students and one teacher. Meanwhile, Friede sets out to pursue his own journey.
1281	1270	2	"Put Your Heart Into It! (Liko and Nyarote, Put All Your Heart Into It)"; Transliteration: "Riko to Nyarōte, Kokoro o Komete" (Japanese: リコとニャローテ、心をこめて)	Directed by : Hiromichi Matano; Storyboarded by : Hiromasa Amano	Kureha Matsuzawa	Makoto Shinjō	April 19, 2024	January 13, 2025 (UK); February 7, 2025 (US)
Liko, Roy, and Dot arrive in Cortondo for Liko's Terastal battle against the local Gym Leader, Katy. They encounter Coral, who challenges Liko to a Pokémon battle. However, Katy suggests a cake-baking contest instead. After successfully baking a cake, Liko battles Katy and loses. Despite the loss, Katy praises Liko's synergy with Floragato and lets her pass her assignment, explaining that winning isn't the only measure of success.
1282	1271	3	"Sparkle! The Glow of Flame and Art! (Shine! The Sparkle of Fire and Art)"; Transliteration: "Kagayake! Honō to Āto no Kirameki" (Japanese: 輝け！炎とアートのきらめき)	Yūji Asada	Michihiro Tsuchiya	Masaaki Iwane & Izumi Shimura	May 3, 2024	January 13, 2025 (UK); February 7, 2025 (US)
Roy, Liko, and Dot travel to Artazon for Roy's Terastal battle against Brassius. Roy has a battle with Nemona, but loses due to the rain affecting his strategy. They participate in the town's art festival, creating art that reflects their bond with Pokémon. Roy eventually challenges Brassius and wins. Impressed with Roy's skills, Brassius rewards him with a stamp for completing his task.
1283	1272	4	"Dot and Nidothing (Dot and Gurumin)"; Transliteration: "Dotto to Gurumin" (Japanese: ドットとぐるみん)	Directed by : Yasuhiro Noda; Storyboarded by : Hiromasa Amano & Yūji Asada	Naohiro Fukushima	Yoshitaka Yanagihara, Natsumi Hattori & Masaya Ōnishi	May 10, 2024	January 13, 2025 (UK); February 7, 2025 (US)
Dot and her friends arrive in Levincia for her Terastal test. To prepare for her battle against Iono, Dot has a practice battle with Roy. She struggles due to camera anxiety and loses. Dot feels more comfortable being in front of cameras while dressed as Nidothing and debates on whether she should face the public as Nidothing or her actual self. After regaining her confidence, she eventually decides to face her test as herself, impressing her friends and earning respect from Iono.
1284	1273	5	"Trending Terastallisation! Dance, Dance, Quaxly! (Shine, Terastal! Dance Dance Kuwassu!!)"; Transliteration: "Haero Terasutaru! Dansu Dansu Kuwassu!!" (Japanese: 映えろテラスタル！ダンス・ダンス・クワッス！！)	Directed by : Takashi Kojima; Storyboarded by : Noriaki Saitō & Yusuke Oshida	Naohiro Fukushima	Yusuke Oshida, Keita Hagiwara, Megumi Matsumoto, Shin'ichi Yoshino & Shūji Tanaka	May 17, 2024	January 13, 2025 (UK); February 7, 2025 (US)
With her Terastal battle against Iono imminent, Dot reflects on battling true to herself and spends the night refining her plan. The next day, Dot and Iono have their battle, but unexpected events unfold, as the electricity in the city is abruptly shut off. Dot improvises by Terastallizing Quaxly into a Water type, surprising Iono. Dot winds up losing the battle, but despite the loss, Iono allows Dot to pass her test.
1285	1274	6	"The Flower Tower (A Prickly Nyarote?! The Mysterious Flower Pillar)"; Transliteration: "Togetoge Nyarōte!? Fushigi na Hanabashira" (Japanese: トゲトゲニャローテ！？不思議な花ばしら)	Directed by : Ayumi Moriyama; Storyboarded by : Kazuaki Mōri	Deko Akao	Chiaki Kurakazu, Toshiko Nakaya, Yūhei Takaboshi, Yūki Kitajima & Prommee Saksit	May 24, 2024	January 13, 2025 (UK); February 7, 2025 (US)
Dot, Liko, and Roy head to a river to observe wild Pokémon for a report. Liko struggles to connect with Floragato, who becomes upset and runs off. Dot notices Floragato's mood and suggests investigating a local phenomenon called the "pillar of petals" to cheer them up. As Liko searches for Floragato, she falls into a ravine. After helping out a group of Toedscool and witnessing the "pillar of petals", Liko and her Pokémon are rescued. Despite forgetting to capture the moment on camera, Liko decides to illustrate it for her report, grateful for the bond strengthened with Floragato through the experience.
1286	1275	7	"Wattrel's High Wind Warning! (Kaiden, High Wind Warning!)"; Transliteration: "Kaiden, Kyōfū Chūihō!" (Japanese: カイデン、強風注意報！)	Directed by : Fumihiro Ueno; Storyboarded by : Hiromasa Amano	Kimiko Ueno	Takashi Shinohara	May 31, 2024	January 13, 2025 (UK); February 7, 2025 (US)
Liko, Roy, and Dot observe wild Pokémon for reports. Roy tries to help Wattrel overcome its fear of flying. At night, Roy encounters Ryme and her Houndstone. Later on, Roy and a Capsakid become trapped on a small cliff. Roy and Capsakid are rescued with Wattrel's help, leading Wattrel to evolve into Kilowattrel in the process. Liko and Dot fail to record the evolution, leaving Roy disappointed. They continue their journey, unaware of a ghostly Pokémon in a nearby forest.
1287	1276	8	"Hatenna and the Otherworldly (Mibrim and the Unworldly)"; Transliteration: "Miburimu to Konoyo Narazaru Mono" (Japanese: ミブリムとこの世ならざるもの)	Yūji Asada	Michihiro Tsuchiya	Masaaki Iwane & Izumi Shimura	June 7, 2024	January 13, 2025 (UK); February 7, 2025 (US)
Liko, Roy, and Dot venture into a forest in search of a mysterious Pokémon known as "the unworldly", which Roy had learned about earlier. They meet three classmates from Naranja Academy who have also encountered the Pokémon. The trio identifies it as Annihilape. Together, they face challenges, resolve misunderstandings with an angry group of Mankey, Primeape, and Annihilape, and restore peace. While quelling three Annihilape, Liko's Hatenna evolves into Hattrem. The group departs the forest and decides to return to Naranja Academy.
1288	1277	9	"The Treasure of Eternity (The Eternal Blessing)"; Transliteration: "Towa no Megumi" (Japanese: 永遠のめぐみ)	Directed by : Yūichi Abe; Storyboarded by : Noriaki Saitō	Kureha Matsuzawa	Yoshitaka Yanagihara & Masaya Ōnishi	June 14, 2024	January 13, 2025 (UK); February 7, 2025 (US)
Friede, studying Lucius' memoirs and Diana's diary, receives updates on repairs to the Brave Olivine from Orla. Friede decides to research Terapagos in the meantime. Meanwhile, Liko, Roy, and Dot head to Naranja Academy; Ann joins them after passing her test. Friede visits Exceed to learn about the Laquium, where he meets his former boss Cervantes and colleague Yanga. Despite setbacks, Friede confronts the guards to find an empty display case for the Laquium. Meanwhile, Amethio plans to seize Terapagos for Gibeon, remaining skeptical of Spinel's movements.
1289	1278	10	"Showdown! The Paldea Elite Four (Confrontation! The Big Four of Paldea)"; Transliteration: "Taiketsu! Parudea Shiten'ou" (Japanese: 対決！パルデア四天王)	Directed by : Yoshihiko Iwata; Storyboarded by : Hiromasa Amano	Naruki Nagakawa	Chiaki Kurakazu, Natsumi Hattori & Megumi Matsumoto	June 21, 2024	January 13, 2025 (UK); February 7, 2025 (US)
After completing their Terastal Training tests, Liko, Roy, Dot, and their fellow students return to Naranja Academy. Director Clavell announces friendly battles against members of the Paldea Elite Four. Initially worried, Dot learns they will battle in Multi Battles with their Gym Leader partners. Dot and Iono face Poppy first. Despite early setbacks, they rally and use teamwork to defeat Poppy. Roy and Brassius face Hassel next, but lose. Liko and Katy are paired together and prepare for their upcoming battle against Rika.
1290	1279	11	"Liko vs. Rika! Towards the Battle's End (Liko VS Chili! Beyond the Battle)"; Transliteration: "Riko VS Chiri! Batoru no Saki ni" (Japanese: リコVSチリ！バトルの先に)	Directed by : Makoto Nakata; Storyboarded by : Makoto Nakata	Naruki Nagakawa	Keita Hagiwara and Yusuke Oshida	June 28, 2024	January 13, 2025 (UK); February 7, 2025 (US)
At Naranja Academy, Liko and Katy face off against Rika from the Paldea Elite Four in a multi battle. As the duel unfolds, both sides employ strategic moves and teamwork, showcasing their bonds with their Pokémon. Meanwhile, Dot wanders into the academy's library and meets Penny and a disguised Chalce, who gives Dot cryptic warnings. Liko and Katy end up losing to Rika. Later, Dot reunites with Liko and Roy and shows them the Scarlet Book, which contains a drawing resembling Terapagos.
1291	1280	12	"The Terapagos I Don't Know (A Terapagos I Don't Know)"; Transliteration: "Watashi no Shiranai Terapagosu" (Japanese: わたしの知らないテラパゴス)	Directed by : Hiromichi Matano; Storyboarded by : Yūji Asada	Kureha Matsuzawa	Makoto Shinjō & Rie Eyama	July 5, 2024	February 17, 2025 (UK); April 25, 2025 (US)
Friede, Clavell, Geeta, and the kids have a meeting to discuss Terapagos. They examine sketches and discuss sightings in Paldea and the Great Crater. Geeta mentions a sighting of a Pokémon that resembles Terapagos in Area Zero, as written in the Scarlet Book. Dot shows a sketch suggesting a third form of Terapagos. They discuss Terapagos' interest in Laqua and plan to explore Area Zero with Geeta. Later, Raifort joins them and leads them to ancient ruins, where she tells them the history of Paldea. Friede connects Laqua to Laquium. At Naranja Academy, the students are assigned to battle more Gym Leaders.
1292	1281	13	"Food Fit for a Kingambit! (The Signature Pokémon is Dodogezan!?)"; Transliteration: "Kanban Pokemon wa Dodogezan!?" (Japanese: 看板ポケモンはドドゲザン！？)	Yasuhiro Noda	Deko Akao	Toshiko Nakaya, Megumi Matsumoto & Kenji Katō	July 12, 2024	February 17, 2025 (UK); April 25, 2025 (US)
Dot, Roy, and Liko arrive in Medali for Dot's Terastal Training test against Larry. They stumble upon the Treasure Eatery, a restaurant that struggles to attract customers. Dot and the others help transform the restaurant's fortunes with the new Kowtow Cleave Udon dish, featuring Kingambit's homemade udon.
1293	1282	14	"Dance, Quaxly! The Blue Medali Step! (Dance, Kuwassu! Blue Champion Steps!!)"; Transliteration: "Odore Kuwassu! Aoiki Chanpuru Suteppu!!" (Japanese: おどれクワッス！碧きチャンプルステップ！！)	Directed by : Fumihiro Ueno; Storyboarded by : Hiromasa Amano	Naohiro Fukushima	Takashi Shinohara	July 26, 2024	February 17, 2025 (UK); April 25, 2025 (US)
Liko, Roy, and Dot find Gym Leader Larry at the Treasure Eatery, where Dot's Terastal Training test begins. Despite Dot's efforts, her Quaxly evolves into Quaxwell but is ultimately defeated by Larry's Staraptor. Larry praises Dot for her strategic use of Pokémon and Terastallization, declaring her test a success.
1294	1283	15	"Roy and Fuecoco's First Snow! (The First Snow! Ho Ho Ga!!)"; Transliteration: "Hajimete no Yuki! Hohhoggee!!" (Japanese: はじめての雪！ホッホッゲー！！)	Directed by : Yoshihiko Iwata; Storyboarded by : Satoru Iriyoshi	Kimiko Ueno	Hiromi Sakai, Yoshitaka Yanagihara, Kenji Katō, Masaya Ōnishi, Toshinari Abe & Hiromi Niioka	August 9, 2024	February 17, 2025 (UK); April 25, 2025 (US)
Liko, Roy, and Dot start their journey to Montenevera and reach Glaseado Mountain. After encountering wild Pokémon in the area, they find a cabin to stay in for the night. During their search for brushwood, Fuecoco falls from the cliff and gets separated from Roy. It is only their song that helps them hear each other and brings Roy and his Pokémon back together.
1295	1284	16	"Resonating Spirits in a Challenge to Ryme! (Let Your Soul Resonate! A Challenge to Rime)"; Transliteration: "Hibike Tamashii! Raimu e no Chousen" (Japanese: 響け魂！ライムへの挑戦)	Directed by : Yoshihiko Iwata; Storyboarded by : Satoru Iriyoshi	Michihiro Tsuchiya	Keita Hagiwara, Chiaki Kurakazu, Natsumi Hattori & Toshinari Abe	August 16, 2024	February 17, 2025 (UK); April 25, 2025 (US)
Roy and his friends arrive in Montenevera for his Terastal Training battle. They find Gym Leader Ryme, who is also a rapper. In his official battle with Ryme, Fuecoco initially succeeds but struggles against Ryme's Toxtricity, which ultimately defeats Fuecoco. Ryme criticizes Roy's partnership with his Pokémon, declaring him a failure.
1296	1285	17	"A New Song for Fuecoco (Me and Hogator's Song)"; Transliteration: "Hogēta to Boku no Uta" (Japanese: ホゲータとぼくの歌)	Yūji Asada	Michihiro Tsuchiya	Masaaki Iwane & Izumi Shimura	August 23, 2024	February 17, 2025 (UK); April 25, 2025 (US)
Nemona suggests an awesome training session to complete before Ryme's second live event in the evening, involving even Liko and Dot. When they stop to rest, the group starts to ponder the questions Ryme asked Roy during the battle. Roy remembers his parents—sailors who taught him to sing before they had to depart on a long voyage. After that, he sang to befriend Pokémon on his island. Realizing that, Roy trains to sing with Fuecoco and wins against Ryme in a battle against Toxtricity, thus passing his implementation test.
1297	1286	18	"Ice Battle! Cold-Eyed Grusha (Battle of Ice! The Cold-Eyed Grusha)"; Transliteration: "Koori no Tatakai! Tsumetai Hitomi no Guruusha" (Japanese: 氷の戦い！冷たい瞳のグルーシャ)	Ayumi Moriyama	Naohiro Fukushima	Kenji Katō, Yusuke Oshida, Megumi Matsumoto, Toshiko Nakaya & Hiromi Niioka	August 30, 2024	February 17, 2025 (UK); April 25, 2025 (US)
Liko, Roy, and Dot arrive at Glaseado Mountain Gym for Liko's Terastal Training test. Liko's test against Gym Leader Grusha proves challenging, as her Pokémon struggle against both of Grusha's Pokémon. Liko loses the battle after Floragato is hit by a super-effective Ice Beam. Grusha, known for his harshness towards others, declares the test a failure and refuses a rematch, leaving Liko disappointed but accepting his judgment.
1298	1287	19	"The Approaching Shadow! (Mount Napper, the Creeping Shadow)"; Transliteration: "Nappe Yama, Shinobiyoru Kage" (Japanese: ナッペ山、しのびよる影)	Hiromichi Matano; Storyboarded by : Hiromasa Amano	Kureha Matsuzawa	Makoto Shinjō & Rie Eyama	September 6, 2024	February 17, 2025 (UK); April 25, 2025 (US)
Liko, Roy, and Dot head to Glaseado Mountain, but Liko gets separated and encounters Amethio, who is seeking Terapagos. While they battle, Spinel intervenes and uses the Eternal Blessing on his Umbreon, causing it to become enraged. Terapagos then destroys Spinel's Laquium crystal, prompting Spinel to flee and trap Liko and Amethio in a cave. Meanwhile, Roy and Dot, who are anxious about Liko, face resistance from Sidian and Coral.
1299	1288	20	"Liko and Amethio (Liko and Amethio)"; Transliteration: "Riko to Amejio" (Japanese: リコとアメジオ)	Makoto Nakata	Kureha Matsuzawa	Koki Yanagihara, Keita Hagiwara & Masaya Ōnishi	September 13, 2024	February 17, 2025 (UK); April 25, 2025 (US)
While Liko and Amethio are trapped in the cave, Amethio reveals that his motivations for seeking Terapagos and Rayquaza are tied to fulfilling his grandfather Gibeon's dream. Roy and Dot battle against Coral and Sidian, but Grusha intervenes, allowing Roy and Dot to reunite with Liko. Meanwhile, Gibeon expels Amethio from the Explorers for helping Liko and allowing Terapagos to escape.
1300	1289	21	"Infiltrating the System! Naranja Academy in Danger! (System Invasion! Crisis at Orange Academy!!)"; Transliteration: "Shisutemu Shin'nyū! Orenji Akademī no Kiki!!" (Japanese: システム侵入！オレンジアカデミーの危機！！)	Kenya Kodama; Storyboarded by : Shōji Nishida	Naruki Nagakawa	Masashi Ōtsuka, Mari Kobayashi, Reina Ono & Yukie Sasaki	September 20, 2024	February 17, 2025 (UK); April 25, 2025 (US)
The Terastal Training students return to Naranja Academy to participate in a battle tournament. Dot and Penny uncover a hacking plot organized by the Explorers' Chalce, who successfully steals computer data on Terapagos. Liko defeats Sidian in a battle, impressing Grusha, who then passes her after having failed her earlier. Liko permanently receives a Tera Orb. Later, Liko and Roy discover that they are set to face each other in the tournament.
1301	1290	22	"Shine on, Terastallization! Liko vs. Roy! (Shine Terastal! Liko VS Roy!!)"; Transliteration: "Kagayake Terasutaru! Riko VS Roi!!" (Japanese: 輝けテラスタル！リコVSロイ！！)	Directed by : Yūichi Abe; Storyboarded by : Mio Hidenin	Naruki Nagakawa	Yusuke Oshida, Chiaki Kurakazu & Natsumi Hattori	September 27, 2024	February 17, 2025 (UK); April 25, 2025 (US)
In the final match of the battle tournament between Liko and Roy, her Floragato and his Fuecoco engage in a back-and-forth fight. Fuecoco evolves into Crocalor mid-battle. The final clash sees Crocalor overpowering Floragato, leading to Roy's victory. Afterward, Liko and her friends reflect on their journey and prepare for new adventures. At the Explorers' base, Spinel continues to study the stolen Terapagos data, opting to keep it a secret from the other members of the Explorers.
1302	1291	23	"Into a New Sky! The Brave Olivine! (To a New Sky! Brave Asagi!!)"; Transliteration: "Aratanaru Sora e! Bureibu Asagi-gō!!" (Japanese: 新たなる空へ！ブレイブアサギ号！！)	Directed by : Fumihiro Ueno; Storyboarded by : Hiromasa Amano	Kureha Matsuzawa	Takashi Shinohara	October 11, 2024	April 30, 2025 (AUS); June 27, 2025 (US)
Liko, Roy, and Dot discuss visiting Kitakami with Raifort to meet Briar, who is studying Terapagos. They reunite with the Rising Volt Tacklers and explore the Brave Olivine's upgrades. Friede returns Lucius' belt, and the trio faces Arboliva, Galarian Moltres, and Lapras in battle. Afterwards, the group decides to head to Kitakami. Meanwhile, Amethio meets with his subordinates, who insist on staying with him. In Kitakami, a photographer named Perrin witnesses a mysterious shadow.
1303	1292	24	"Roy is Crocalor, and Crocalor is Roy! (I'm a Pokémon and You're Me!?)"; Transliteration: "Boku ga Pokemon de, Kimi ga Boku!?" (Japanese: ぼくがポケモンで、キミがぼく！？)	Yoshihiko Iwata	Deko Akao	Masaya Ōnishi, Yūhei Takaboshi, Yoshitaka Yanagihara, Hiromi Niioka & Toshiko Nakaya	October 18, 2024	May 1, 2025 (AUS); June 27, 2025 (US)
The Rising Volt Tacklers arrive in Kitakami to meet Briar but find Mossui Town deserted due to a harvest festival. At the festival, Roy and Crocalor accidentally switch bodies using a mysterious device, trying to keep their situation a secret from the others. The group navigates the festival and helps others along the way. After restoring their bodies, Carmine reveals that Briar is her teacher and is currently at the Crystal Pool, which is where the group decides to head next.
1304	1293	25	"Tinkatink's Hammer Wasn't Made in a Day (Kanuchan's Hammer Wasn't Made in a Day)"; Transliteration: "Kanuchan no Hanmā wa 1-nichi ni Shite Narazu" (Japanese: カヌチャンのハンマーは1日にしてならず)	Yūji Asada	Kimiko Ueno	Masaaki Iwane & Izumi Shimura	October 25, 2024	May 2, 2025 (AUS); June 27, 2025 (US)
On their way to meet Briar, Liko, Roy, Dot, and Friede encounter a Bombirdier, which drops metallic objects to startle them. Dot's Tinkatink becomes focused on improving her hammer by molding a piece of metal, but loses it to the Bombirdier. After chasing it and retrieving the metal, Tinkatink evolves into Tinkatuff during a battle against two Bombirdier. Tinkatuff and Quaxwell manage to defeat the Pokémon.
1305	1294	26	"Encounters at the Crystal Pool (Encounter at the Illuminating Pool)"; Transliteration: "Terasu Ike no Deai" (Japanese: てらす池の出会い)	Directed by : Yoshihisa Matsumoto; Storyboarded by : Shōji Nishida	Dai Satō	Masumi Hattori	November 1, 2024	May 5, 2025 (AUS); June 27, 2025 (US)
Liko, Roy, Dot, and Friede meet Briar at the Crystal Pool after calming an aggressive Milotic. Briar shares her research on the Terastal phenomenon, Terapagos, and her ancestor Heath's discoveries about Area Zero. She shows them the Scarlet Book and theorizes a link between the Terapagos and the Six Heroes, though she lacks details on the Laquium. The group leaves without answers on Lucius or Terapagos' past. Meanwhile, Dot defeats Perrin in a battle and earns a photograph of Kleavor, with Perrin preparing to share her knowledge about the Pokémon.
1306	1295	27	"The Search for Kleavor! (Pursuit! The Search for Basagiri!!)"; Transliteration: "Tsuiseki! Basagiri o Sagase!!" (Japanese: 追跡！バサギリを探せ！！)	Directed by : Hiromichi Matano; Storyboarded by : Satoru Iriyoshi	Michihiro Tsuchiya	Makoto Shinjō & Rie Eyama	November 8, 2024	May 6, 2025 (AUS); June 27, 2025 (US)
The Rising Volt Tacklers, led by Perrin, search for Lucius' Kleavor on Tengu Mountain despite not knowing Kleavor's exact location. The group becomes separated and faces many obstacles and wild Pokémon. Liko encounters a tree with Kleavor's axe marks on it, which gives her an idea of how to track it. Dot and Perrin identify a plant and a set of rocks resembling a Dugtrio from one of Perrin's photos of Kleavor and set off for that specific location. The group finally approaches Kleavor's location, but it runs off again, with Terapagos sensing its presence.
1307	1296	28	"Kleavor the Solitary Warrior (Basagiri the Lone Warrior)"; Transliteration: "Kokō no Senshi Basagiri" (Japanese: 孤高の戦士バサギリ)	Ayumi Moriyama	Michihiro Tsuchiya	Keita Hagiwara, Natsumi Hattori, Toshinari Abe, Izumi Shimura & Yūki Kitajima	November 15, 2024	May 7, 2025 (AUS); June 27, 2025 (US)
Liko, Roy, Dot, Friede, and Perrin search for Kleavor on Tengu Mountain. After Lapras begins battling Kleavor, they learn that the two Pokémon share a past and were only greeting each other. Following a fight in a bamboo grove, they gain Kleavor's trust. It leads them to an Ancient Poké Ball and shows a vision of Lucius freeing it and inviting it on his adventure. Lucius mentions someone named Rystal, which sparks the group's curiosity. Kleavor joins them. After Perrin departs, Liko and the others return to the Brave Olivine, where they are visited by her grandmother's Squawkabilly.
1308	1297	29	"The Three Explorers (The Three Explorers)"; Transliteration: "San-nin no Ekkusupurōrāzu" (Japanese: 3人のエクスプローラーズ)	Directed by : Tsurugi Harada; Storyboarded by : Hiromasa Amano	Kureha Matsuzawa	Yōsuke Toyama & Katsuji Matsumoto	November 22, 2024	May 8, 2025 (AUS); June 27, 2025 (US)
After Liko's grandmother, Diana, returns, she challenges Liko to a battle. Liko, with her Floragato, ends up winning the battle. Following that, Diana explains that Lucius was the founder of the Explorers and that she had searched for information on the origins of the organization. Eventually, the group returns to the Crystal Pool, where Lucius' wife, Rystal, appears from the past. It is then revealed that both Diana and Liko are descendants of Lucius, much to Liko's shock.
1309	1298	30	"The Wonders of the World! (The Entrusted Future, the Shine of This World)"; Transliteration: "Takusareta Mirai, Kono Sekai no Kagayaki" (Japanese: 託された未来、この世界の輝き)	Directed by : Makoto Nakata; Storyboarded by : Makoto Nakata & Saori Den	Kureha Matsuzawa	Yoshitaka Yanagihara, Megumi Matsumoto & Masaya Ōnishi	November 29, 2024	May 9, 2025 (AUS); June 27, 2025 (US)
In a flashback, Rystal runs away from three men who are chasing her, trying to take Terapagos, whom she nicknamed "Pagogo". However, Lucius appears and scares the men away with his Rayquaza. Later, at a bar, they meet Gibeon, and the three embark on an adventure to find Laqua. They eventually reach Laqua, but Gibeon stays behind to research the energy emanating from the crystals. However, the energy spreads, causing all the Pokémon to become aggressive. Gibeon falls down a hole, while Lucius stays behind and is imprisoned by the crystals. In the present, Rystal says goodbye and returns to the past, leaving Pagogo in tears. Pagogo is then caught by Liko and becomes part of her team, with Diana once again leaving the group.
1310	1299	31	"Wynaut?! Wy-Yes! (Sohnano? Sohdayo!)"; Transliteration: "Sō nano? Sohdayo!" (Japanese: ソーナノ？ソーダヨ！)	Yūji Asada	Naohiro Fukushima	Masaaki Iwane & Izumi Shimura	December 6, 2024	May 12, 2025 (UK); June 27, 2025 (US)
The Rising Volt Tacklers meet Wy-Yes, a former team member, to gather information about Entei. However, Mollie is irritated by his presence due to their past history and Wy-Yes' tendency to make false claims. While waiting at an oasis, the group encounters a Farigiraf and is attacked until Wy-Yes arrives. Later, Wy-Yes begins telling exaggerated tales about the team members. Back at the oasis, the group resolves a territorial conflict between the Farigiraf and an Espathra by restoring water to the oasis. Wy-Yes finally confirms that Entei was spotted in Olivine City, prompting the team to set course for Johto.
1311	1300	32	"Ludlow's Homecoming! (Randou Returns to His Hometown)"; Transliteration: "Randō, Kokyō e Kaeru" (Japanese: ランドウ、故郷へ帰る)	Directed by : Fumihiro Ueno; Storyboarded by : Hiromasa Amano	Kimiko Ueno	Wu Xiaolai, Toshinari Abe, Toshiko Nakatani & Takeshi Kobayashi	December 13, 2024	May 12, 2025 (UK); June 27, 2025 (US)
The Rising Volt Tacklers arrive in Olivine City to search for Entei. Liko learns the city was named after Ludlow's fishing boat and discovers it's his hometown. The group meets Cyskel, who recalls the city's movie studio and the "Versus Sharpedo" film series. He idolizes the hero, Guy Silver, who vanished after the series. They learn Guy Silver is actually Mighty G, whom they met earlier. Cyskel, initially in denial, accepts that Guy Silver has aged. At the Whirl Islands, Ludlow, disguised as Mighty G, rescues the group's Tatsugiri and Cyskel's Wooper. Cyskel, realizing Ludlow is Mighty G, takes a photo with him. Without new leads on Entei, Cyskel shares that Entei was seen at a nearby archipelago.
1312	1301	33	"Entei's Fierce Battle Cry! (A Fierce Fight Against Entei! The Noble Roar of Flame!!)"; Transliteration: "Gekitō Entei! Honō no Otakebi!!" (Japanese: 激闘エンテイ！炎のおたけび！！)	Directed by : Yoshihiko Iwata; Storyboarded by : Noriaki Saitō	Naruki Nagakawa	Natsumi Hattori, Keita Hagiwara, Yūhei Takaboshi & Hiromi Sakai	December 20, 2024	May 12, 2025 (UK); June 27, 2025 (US)
The Rising Volt Tacklers continue their search for Lucius' Entei. They arrive at the site of a submarine volcano, where Entei eventually appears. The group challenges Entei and earns its respect. Liko and Pagogo try to recruit Entei, but it ignores them and joins Raikou and Suicune, forming the trio of Legendary Beasts. The group realizes that this Entei isn't Lucius' but remains amazed by the encounter. Meanwhile, Amethio seeks information about Laquium from Cervantis, who directs him to Gibeon. Briar contacts the group with evidence suggesting that another Entei was seen in Area Zero. With this new lead, the team returns to Paldea.
1313	1302	34	"Over the Top"; Transliteration: "Ōbā za Toppu" (Japanese: オーバー・ザ・トップ)	Directed by : Ayae Shinkai; Storyboarded by : Shōji Nishida	Dai Satō	Yusuke Oshida, Megumi Matsumoto & Megumi Niioka	January 10, 2025	July 17, 2025 (UK); September 26, 2025 (US)
The Rising Volt Tacklers return to Paldea to continue their search for Lucius' Entei. Liko, Roy, and Dot request permission from Geeta to visit Area Zero. Impressed by their determination, Geeta decides to test their strength in battle. The trio faces adversity when their Pokémon are poisoned by Geeta's Glimmora. However, Liko devises a clever strategy that allows them to defeat Geeta. Following the battle, the Rising Volt Tacklers are granted permission to explore Area Zero. Unbeknownst to them, Coral and Sidian are assigned to monitor their actions.
1314	1303	35	"Total-lie Awesome Pokémon in Area Zero?! (Totally Awesome Pokémon in Area Zero?!)"; Transliteration: "Eria Zero de Oniike Pokemon!?" (Japanese: エリアゼロでオニイケポケモン！？)	Directed by : Hiromichi Matano; Storyboarded by : Hiromasa Amano	Deko Akao	Hiromichi Matano, Makoto Shinjō & Rie Eyama	January 17, 2025	July 17, 2025 (UK); September 26, 2025 (US)
The Rising Volt Tacklers begin their exploration of Area Zero, while Sidian and Coral secretly spy on them from afar. Roy encounters a Sandy Shocks, which he mistakes for a Magneton with hair, and is chased away by it. Meanwhile, Coral follows him and accidentally disturbs a Scream Tail, leading to a chaotic battle with a Great Tusk. Roy and Crocalor engage in a battle with Sandy Shocks and defeat it, and Coral unintentionally captures the Scream Tail.
1315	1304	36	"The Pillar of Fire (A Grand Battle! Earth-Gouging Fire)"; Transliteration: "Dai Batoru! Daichi o Ugatsu Honō" (Japanese: 大バトル！大地を穿つ炎)	Directed by : Kyōhei Sumiyama; Storyboarded by : Makoto Nakata	Michihiro Tsuchiya	Yoshitaka Yanagihara, Masaya Ōnishi & Toshinari Abe	January 24, 2025	July 17, 2025 (UK); September 26, 2025 (US)
The Rising Volt Tacklers arrive at the site where Entei was last seen and discuss the possibility of it being one of the Six Heroes. Entei suddenly appears, but its appearance differs from the one they encountered earlier. Liko approaches it with Lucius' belt, but Entei challenges them to a battle by stealing the belt. During the battle, the group realizes that Entei is actually a Paradox Pokémon named Gouging Fire, not the Entei they expected. They manage to gain Gouging Fire's approval, and it joins them. Afterwards, Pagogo and the other five heroes summon the Black Rayquaza.
1316	1305	37	"Beyond the Shining Rainbow (At the End of the Shining Rainbow)"; Transliteration: "Hikari Dashita Niji no Saki de" (Japanese: 光り出した虹の先で)	Yūji Asada	Kureha Matsuzawa	Masaaki Iwane & Izumi Shimura	January 31, 2025	July 17, 2025 (UK); September 26, 2025 (US)
The Rising Volt Tacklers begin their battle against the Black Rayquaza. The group struggles to land a decisive blow, with most of their Pokémon knocked out except for Roy's Crocalor. Pagogo transforms into its Terastal Form and joins the battle, dealing significant damage. Crocalor Terastalizes and defeats Rayquaza, and Roy captures it with the Ancient Poké Ball. With all of the Six Heroes reunited, the Rising Volt Tacklers bid farewell to Briar and continue their journey towards Laqua, with Rayquaza leading the way.
1317	1306	38	"The Truth Revealed! (The Truth Revealed? Amethio's Resolve!)"; Transliteration: "Akasareru Shinjitsu? Amejio no Ketsui!" (Japanese: 明かされる真実？アメジオの決意！)	Ayumi Moriyama	Kureha Matsuzawa	Keita Hagiwara, Natsumi Hattori, Toshiko Nakaya, Hiromi Sakai & Yoshitaka Yanagihara	February 7, 2025	July 17, 2025 (UK); September 26, 2025 (US)
During a meeting between several members of the Explorers, Gibeon orders an ambush on the Rising Volt Tacklers at Laqua, with Spinel tasked with leading the mission. Meanwhile, Amethio secretly investigates Spinel's lab and discovers his plans involving the Laquium and a "Laquium Sphere." The Rising Volt Tacklers head toward Laqua, concerned about the power and scarcity of the Laquium. Amethio learns more about Gibeon's past, including his quest for Laquium and his ties to Lucius. As tensions rise between the Explorers, Amethio becomes determined to stop Spinel from using the Laquium. The Rising Volt Tacklers, misled by Rayquaza's flight, divert to Pericarp Town instead of Laqua.
1318	1307	39	"Where the Land Meets the Sky (The Place Where Heaven and Earth Meet)"; Transliteration: "Ten to Chi ga Deau Tokoro" (Japanese: 天と地が出会う処)	Directed by : Yoshihiko Iwata; Storyboarded by : Satoru Iriyoshi	Naohiro Fukushima	Masumi Hattori	February 14, 2025	July 17, 2025 (UK); September 26, 2025 (US)
The Rising Volt Tacklers arrive in Pericarp Town in search of Laqua and Rayquaza. They meet Yuha, a local boy who blames Rayquaza for a series of events. While exploring the town, Friede learns from the town's matriarch that a mysterious explosion occurred a century ago at Mount Pericarp. Rayquaza was seen flying away, and a long-haired man (Gibeon) appeared. Friede updates the team, revealing that Laqua lies at the "place where the land meets the sky" on Mount Pericarp. The group embarks on a dangerous trek up the mountain, facing various obstacles. They eventually reach a cloud-filled crater at the summit.
1319	1308	40	"The Pokémon Paradise of Laqua! (Arrival! The Paradise of Rakua)"; Transliteration: "Tōchaku! Rakuen Rakua" (Japanese: 到着！楽園ラクア)	Directed by : Fumihiro Ueno; Storyboarded by : Noriaki Saitō	Kureha Matsuzawa	Tatsuya Oka, Azusa Nishimura & Takeshi Kobayashi	February 21, 2025	July 17, 2025 (UK); September 26, 2025 (US)
The Rising Volt Tacklers explore Mount Pericarp, where they discover a lush, peaceful crater filled with Pokémon, including Legendary ones, living in harmony. They marvel at the environment, but Friede suspects that an unknown factor, possibly related to the Laquium, is influencing it. Liko grows worried about having to say goodbye to Terapagos but is comforted by her friends. The group uncovers a hidden barrier powered by Terastal energy, which Terapagos successfully removes. Friede plans to investigate further but is confronted by Spinel, while Liko, Roy, and Dot face Coral, Sidian, and Chalce.
1320	1309	41	"The Rising Volt Tacklers vs. The Explorers! (The Rising Volteccers VS The Explorers!)"; Transliteration: "Raijingu Borutekkāzu VS Ekusupurōrāzu!" (Japanese: ライジングボルテッカーズVSエクスプローラーズ！)	Makoto Nakata	Kureha Matsuzawa	Yoshitaka Yanagihara, Megumi Matsumoto & Masaya Ōnishi	February 28, 2025	July 17, 2025 (UK); September 26, 2025 (US)
Gibeon begins making his way to the Laquium, eager to fulfill his wish. The Explorers confront the Rising Volt Tacklers and reveal that they have been watching Laqua from the beginning and needed the Rising Volt Tacklers' help to remove the barrier blocking access to it. As tensions rise, battles ensue between the two sides. Friede and Spinel engage in a double battle, with Captain Pikachu and Charizard facing off against Spinel's Umbreon and Beheeyem. Meanwhile, Coral's team confronts Liko and the others. After some intense moments, the Rising Volt Tacklers emerge victorious in both battles. Afterwards, the Laquium shoots upwards into the sky, summoning Pagogo.
1321	1310	42	"Guided by the Black Rayquaza! (The Guidance of the Black Rayquaza)"; Transliteration: "Kuroi Rekkuuza no Michibiki" (Japanese: 黒いレックウザの導き)	Directed by : Kenya Kodama; Storyboarded by : Hiromasa Amano	Kureha Matsuzawa	Miki Ueda, Masashi Ōtsuka, Kei Takahashi, Anri Ikumi, Yukie Sasaki, Mari Kobayashi & Takaaki Sonoda	March 7, 2025	July 17, 2025 (UK); September 26, 2025 (US)
Gibeon arrives at the Laquium site with his 10% Forme White Zygarde to excavate crystals. Zygarde transforms into its 50% Forme, and Gibeon presses on despite his physical limitations. Tensions rise when Amethio tries to stop Gibeon and challenges the ethics of Laquium. After the Rising Volt Tacklers and Spinel arrive, Lucius emerges from one of the crystals, revived after a century. He warns of the dangers Laquium poses to Pokémon and ecosystems, revealing that Zygarde had been monitoring it. Gibeon insists on using Laquium for the greater good, but Lucius and the Rising Volt Tacklers oppose him. As the Laquium Core activates, Lucius warns of a global disaster. Amethio and the Rising Volt Tacklers join forces to stop Gibeon in a final battle.
1322	1311	43	"The Earthshaking White Zygarde (The White Zygarde Causes Shock Waves)"; Transliteration: "Gekishin no Shiroi Zygarde" (Japanese: 激震の白いジガルデ)	Hiroaki Takagi	Kureha Matsuzawa	Yusuke Oshida, Toshinari Abe, Yūhei Takaboshi, Izumi Shimura, Megumi Matsumoto & Masaya Ōnishi	March 14, 2025	July 17, 2025 (UK); September 26, 2025 (US)
On Laqua, the Explorers continue their mission to activate the Laquium Core, with Liko and the others preparing to face Gibeon and his White Zygarde. Despite several attempts, Zygarde overpowers their attacks, but with teamwork and evolving bonds, Liko's Floragato evolves into Meowscarada. With its newly learned Flower Trick, Meowscarada defeats Zygarde. Gibeon, stubborn in his belief in science, fails to understand the power of the bonds between Pokémon and trainers, while Liko and her friends' connection ultimately leads to victory. Zygarde reverts to its cells and abandons Gibeon. Pagogo then Terastallizes into its Stellar Form and joins forces with the Six Heroes, sharing its energy with them as they ascend into the sky.
1323	1312	44	"Where the Adventure Leads (Beyond the Adventure)"; Transliteration: "Bōken no Saki ni" (Japanese: 冒険の先に)	Kyohei Sumiyama	Kureha Matsuzawa	Keita Hagiwara, Hattori Natsumi, Shinjo Makoto, Rie Eyama & Erial	March 21, 2025	July 17, 2025 (UK); September 26, 2025 (US)
With the help of the Six Heroes, Pagogo transforms into its Stellar Form and purifies the Laquium on Laqua, leaving Gibeon to reflect on his unfulfilled goals. Amethio vows to continue his path without relying on the Laquium. Gibeon entrusts the future to him and the next generation. As Gibeon and Lucius pass on, the Six Heroes are freed, but Spinel uses Laquium mist to make them go berserk and declares that the Explorers will take over Laqua. The Rising Volt Tacklers are unable to stop the chaos and must escape with the help of the Black Rayquaza. As they try to leave, Liko loses Lucius' belt and notebook and the situation gets worsens when Friede and Charizard fall off the Brave Olivine, leaving their fates unknown. A year later, Liko reflects on the past, while Spinel becomes the new director of Exceed to frame the Rising Volt Tacklers for Laqua's collapse. Roy, now with a newly obtained shiny Lucario and a Mega Ring, sets out to find someone important.

== Release ==
On November 20, 2024, The Pokémon Company reported that a second season of Pokémon Horizons, under the title of Pokémon Horizons: Season 2 – The Search for Laqua was scheduled for release on the streaming service Netflix. In the United States, The Search for Laqua was officially released on February 7, April 25, June 27 and September 26, 2025, respectively, while in Canada, the season began airing on Cartoon Network and Télétoon the following day on February 8 of that year. The Search for Laqua was released earlier in the United Kingdom with episodes released on January 13, February 17, May 12 and July 17, 2025, respectively, on BBC iPlayer.

== Music ==
The Japanese opening themes are "Will" by Ive for 22 episodes and "Only One Story" by Zerobaseone for 22 episodes. The Japanese ending themes are "Let Me Battle" by 9Lana for 22 episodes, "Sparkle!" (ピッカーン！, Pikkān!) by Giga, TeddyLoid, and Sakurazaka46 featuring Rina Matsuda and Hikaru Morita for 22 episodes.

The English opening theme outside of Asia is "My Favorite Pokémon" by Isaiah Tyrell Boyd and Haven Paschall, its intsrumental version serves as the ending theme. In Asia, "Will -Korean ver.-" is used as the English opening theme song, while "Make You Shine (English Version)" is used as ending theme.

== Critical reception ==
In a February 2025 review for IGN, Kirsten Carey gave the first half of The Search for Laqua a score of 5 out of 10, saying that the season "largely ditches the series' innovations in favor of a format that's as old as Ash, Misty, and Brock's tussles with Team Rocket". The first thirty-three episodes of the season received a "A", "A-" and "B-" score, respectively, at Anime News Network.
