= Pokémon Horizons – Wonders Ahead =

2027 season of Pokémon Horizons

- Season 29 (overall); Season 4 (Horizons)
- No. of episodes: 22

Release
- Original network: TV Tokyo
- Original release: May 22, 2026 – present

Season chronology
- ← Previous; Horizons – Rising Hope

Pokémon Horizons – Wonders Ahead, (Note: It is officially known as Pokémon Horizons: Season 4 – Wonders Ahead.) known in Japan as Pocket Monsters: Wonder Voyage, (Note: Japanese: ポケットモンスター ワンダーボヤージュ, Hepburn: Poketto Monsutā: Wandā Boyāju) is twenty-ninth season of the Pokémon anime series and the fourth season of Pokémon Horizons: The Series, known in Japan as Pocket Monsters (ポケットモンスター, Poketto Monsutā). It is produced by OLM and directed by Daiki Tomiyasu (chief director) and Makoto Nakata. The season premiered in Japan on TV Tokyo on May 22, 2026.

This season follows Liko, Roy, Dot and Ult as they embark on a new adventure. It introduces Navi, a girl associated with a Ditto, while promotional artwork for the season also features Pokémon including Koraidon and Miraidon. The initial promotional visual also included imagery referencing Pokémon Go, Pokémon Unite and Pokémon Sleep.

== Episode list ==
Jap. overall	Eng. overall	No. in season	English title Japanese title	Directed by	Written by	Animation directed by	Original release date	English release date
1371	TBA	1	"Reboot! Off to the World of Adventure!!"; Transliteration: "Ribūto! Bōken no Sekai e!!" (Japanese: リブート！冒険の世界へ！！)	Yūji Asada	Kureha Matsuzawa	Masaaki Iwane & Izumi Shimura	May 22, 2026	February 27, 2027 (US)
With their adventure at Laqua over, Liko, Roy, Dot, and Ult have become listless and are unsure what to do next. Friede returns and invites them on fieldwork to investigate an unusual Feebas that behaves very differently from its Pokédex description. Their attempts to catch the Feebas lead them to encounter several Pokémon behaving in unexpected ways, rekindling their excitement for discovery. The following morning, after watching Captain Pikachu challenge the Feebas, Liko and the others decide that they want to continue exploring the world together, and the Rising Volt Tacklers set out on a new adventure.
1372	TBA	2	"Enter the Fake Rising Volt Tacklers?!"; Transliteration: "Nise Raijingu Borutekkāzu Tōjō!!" (Japanese: 偽ライジングボルテッカーズ登場！？)	Directed by : Satoshi Takatō; Storyboarded by : Hiromasa Amano	Kureha Matsuzawa	Hiromi Niioka & Yuki Masutani	May 29, 2026	TBA
Dot discovers several news reports claiming that the Rising Volt Tacklers have been helping people, even though the group has no memory of the reported incidents. Suspecting that someone is impersonating them, Liko, Roy, Dot, and Ult investigate and discover a family traveling in a camper van disguised as the Brave Olivine. The family reveals that they are enthusiastic fans of the Rising Volt Tacklers and challenges the group to a four-on-four Pokémon battle. During the battle, the parents surprise the group by Mega Evolving their Raichu into Mega Raichu X and Mega Raichu Y. After Dot identifies their battle strategy, Liko and Roy defeat the two Raichu with Meowscarada and Skeledirge. When the family apologizes for being mistaken for the real Rising Volt Tacklers, the group encourages them to continue their adventures since they have only been helping people. As the Rising Volt Tacklers depart, an unseen Ditto sneaks aboard the Brave Olivine by transforming into Captain Pikachu.
1373	TBA	3	"The Secret Metamon Rhapsody"; Transliteration: "Naisho no Metamon Kyōshikyoku" (Japanese: ないしょのメタモン狂詩曲)	Directed by : Hiroyuki Okuno; Storyboarded by : Kentarō Tsubame	Deko Akao	Kōsuke Hiramatsu, Nozomi Sekikawa, Zearth Sato, Kōki Yanagihara & Toshinari Abe	June 5, 2026	TBA
The Ditto that secretly boarded the Brave Olivine befriends Skeledirge, Lycanroc, Quaquaval, Sableye, and the other Pokémon aboard the ship. Worried that the crew will not allow Ditto to stay because the airship is already crowded, the Pokémon attempt to keep its presence hidden while Ditto repeatedly transforms into different Pokémon and objects, causing chaos throughout the ship. During a cleanup, Meowscarada accidentally has an Alolan Muk swallow a wooden Squawkabilly carving that Liko intended to give to her grandmother. Feeling responsible, Ditto transforms into a copy of the carving before later helping Meowscarada recover the real one by tickling Muk and causing it to spit out the items it had eaten. After Ditto's presence is finally revealed, Liko and the others realize how attached it has become to the Pokémon aboard the Brave Olivine. With Captain Pikachu's approval, Ditto is welcomed as a new member of the Rising Volt Tacklers.
1374	TBA	4	"Clap Clap Clap! Mini-Gurumin!!"; Transliteration: "Pan Pan Pan! Mini Gurumin!!" (Japanese: パンパンパン！ミニぐるみん！！)	Directed by : Michihiro Satō; Storyboarded by : Yūko Kiyoshima	Kimiko Ueno	Ye He & Jingguo Wang	June 12, 2026	TBA
During one of Dot's Nidothing livestreams, Ditto transforms into a miniature version of Nidothing and accidentally appears on camera. Rather than reacting negatively, viewers become enthusiastic about the small impersonator, nicknaming it "Mini-Gurumin". Dot decides to bring Ditto to a bread festival where Nidothing is scheduled to perform. While exploring the festival, Ditto repeatedly transforms into various objects and baked goods in an attempt to cheer people up, eventually becoming separated from the group. Liko, Roy, and Ult realize that laughter causes Ditto to lose its transformation and use this knowledge to find it. They return just in time for Ditto to appear alongside Nidothing onstage as Mini-Gurumin. Afterwards, the group realizes that Ditto's seemingly mischievous transformations were its attempts to make others happy.
1375	TBA	5	"Ready Go! Unite Battle!!"; Transliteration: "READY GO! Unite Battle!!" (Japanese: READY GO！ユナイトバトル！！)	Yūji Asada	Michihiro Tsuchiya	Masaaki Iwane & Izumi Shimura	June 19, 2026	TBA
At Friede's invitation, Liko, Roy, Dot, and Ult travel to Aeos Island to participate in their first Unite Battle. At Remoat Stadium, the Rising Volt Tacklers face the Shining Oceans, a popular and highly skilled five-member team. Initially struggling with the unfamiliar rules, the group learns to collect Aeos energy, score goals, and use powerful Unite Moves. The Shining Oceans build a sizable lead, but Friede urges the team to save their Unite Moves for an opportunity to turn the match around. When Zapdos appears near the end of the battle, both teams compete for its Aeos energy. Ult's Sableye prevents the opposing Sirfetch'd from landing the final attack, allowing the Rising Volt Tacklers to defeat Zapdos and make a final push toward the opposing goal. Captain Pikachu scores the decisive points just before time expires, earning the Rising Volt Tacklers their first Unite Battle victory.
1376	TBA	6	"Miare City! New Encounters"; Transliteration: "Miare City! Arata na Deai" (Japanese: ミアレシティ！新たな出会い)	Directed by : Hiromichi Matano; Storyboarded by : Hiromasa Amano	Dai Satō	Makoto Shinjō, Rie Eyama & Yuki Masutani	July 3, 2026	TBA
The Rising Volt Tacklers arrive in Lumiose City and visit the Looker Bureau, where they reunite with Emma and meet her young assistant, Navi. When an elderly woman asks Emma to find her missing Carbink, the group splits up to investigate. Roy, Ult, and Navi spot a large man named Ivor carrying Carbink and follow him, believing he may have taken it. Ivor recognizes Roy's Lucario and challenges him to a battle, Mega Evolving his Falinks while Roy Mega Evolves Lucario. Roy wins after identifying a weakness in Falinks's formation. Ivor then explains that his sister had found the lost Carbink and he was trying to return it. After Carbink is reunited with its Trainer, Navi discovers that her treasured but empty Dream Ball is missing. Unbeknownst to her, Ditto has found it aboard the Brave Olivine.
1377	TBA	7	"A Dream Ball for You!"; Transliteration: "Dorīmu Bōru o Kimi ni!" (Japanese: ドリームボールをキミに！)	Chiko Ueta	Dai Satō	Kōki Yanagihara, Masaya Ōnishi, Kenji Katō, Mina Ōtaka & Tomoki Ogawa	July 17, 2026	TBA
Navi remains upset over losing the Dream Ball Emma gave her, explaining that she hopes to use it when she eventually finds the Pokémon she wants as her partner. Meanwhile, Ditto leaves the Brave Olivine to return the ball and searches Lumiose City for Navi. During Emma's patrol, Ditto finally finds Navi and returns the Dream Ball to her. After spending time together, Navi tells Ditto about her dream of traveling to unfamiliar places and meeting new Pokémon. When the Rising Volt Tacklers prepare to leave Lumiose City, Navi realizes that she wants to travel with them. Ditto returns to Navi as the Brave Olivine turns back for her. With Emma's blessing, Navi asks Ditto to become her partner and catches it in the Dream Ball, making Ditto her first Pokémon. Navi subsequently joins the Rising Volt Tacklers and departs Lumiose City aboard the Brave Olivine.
1378	TBA	8	"Navi's Little Big Adventure!"; Transliteration: "Navi no Chiisana Daibōken!" (Japanese: ナヴィの小さな大冒険！)	Directed by : Rika Mashiko; Storyboarded by : Yūko Kiyoshima	Kureha Matsuzawa	Kōki Yanagihara, Natsumi Hattori & Mina Ōtaka	July 31, 2026	TBA
Navi settles into life aboard the Brave Olivine, but continues to clash with Ult. When Murdock and Mollie need supplies from a nearby town, Navi volunteers and Ult is sent with her. After another argument, Navi goes ahead by herself but becomes lost after realizing she left her Rotom Phone aboard the airship. She and Ditto accidentally anger a wild Raticate, prompting Ult to find them and intervene. Rather than fighting for her, Ult encourages Navi to understand Ditto's feelings and guides her through her first Pokémon battle. After struggling to match Raticate's strength, Navi has Ditto transform into a rock just as Raticate attempts to bite it, forcing Raticate to retreat. Navi wins her first battle and thanks Ult for his help. They return safely to the Brave Olivine, although their usual bickering soon resumes.
1379	TBA	9	"It's Astonishing! Mega Rayquaza and the Mystical Land?!"; Transliteration: "Kyōgaku! Mega Rekkuza to Shinpi no Chi!?" (Japanese: 驚愕！メガレックウザと神秘の地！？)	Jirō Arimoto	Naohiro Fukushima	Natsumi Hattori, Toshinari Abe & Hiromi Niioka	August 14, 2026	TBA
Former Rising Volt Tackler Wy-Yes visits the Brave Olivine and tells the group about Area Delta, a mysterious location where strange phenomena and a Mega Rayquaza have supposedly been seen during a full moon. Liko, Roy, Dot, and Ult accompany him to investigate while Navi accidentally sleeps through their departure. At Area Delta, the group witnesses Clefairy performing their full-moon dance before being confronted by falling rocks, violent winds, and fire. They seemingly encounter Mega Rayquaza and find themselves transported to a strange alternate world, where Ult attempts to battle it. The group subsequently awakens and realizes that the Clefairy's Metronome had produced Confuse Ray, causing them to hallucinate. A nearby Shiny Ekans was apparently mistaken for Mega Rayquaza during the confusion. Despite this, Wy-Yes publishes a sensational article claiming their supernatural encounter was genuine.
1380	TBA	10	"Wanival and Dekanuchan's Operation: Sleep!"; Transliteration: "Wēnibaru to Dekanuchan, Surīpu Daisakusen!" (Japanese: ウェーニバルとデカヌチャン、スリープ大作戦！)	Directed by : Ayae Shinkai; Storyboarded by : Kentarō Tsubame	Kimiko Ueno	Yuzuko Hanai & Kana Fujishiro	August 21, 2026	TBA
Dot becomes concerned when Quaquaval and Tinkaton are unable to sleep. The group meets Professor Neroli, a researcher specializing in Pokémon sleep, who determines that the two Pokémon may be frightened after watching ghost stories with Dot. He takes the Rising Volt Tacklers to Greengrass Isle, where a Snorlax's "Drowsy Power" can help Pokémon sleep. However, the hungry Snorlax wakes before Quaquaval and Tinkaton can fall asleep, so the group gathers ingredients for its favorite "Dream Eater" Butter Curry. Quaquaval and Tinkaton encounter Haunter and Banette, initially becoming terrified of them, but the Ghost Pokémon later return stolen ingredients and help prepare the curry, allowing the pair to overcome their fear. After Snorlax eats the curry and falls asleep, Quaquaval and Tinkaton finally get a full night's rest. Neroli later discovers Captain Pikachu's unusual sleeping pose.
1381	TBA	11	"Right in the Feels! Why, It's a Pokémon Contest!!"; Transliteration: "Geki Emo! Pokémon Kontesuto Zamasu!!" (Japanese: 激エモ！ポケモンコンテストざます！！)	Directed by : Misu Yamaneko; Storyboarded by : Noriaki Saitō	Naruki Nagakawa	STUDIO MASSKET	August 28, 2026	TBA
After Meowscarada, Skeledirge, and Quaquaval accidentally create a dazzling combination of moves, Navi suggests entering the performance in a Pokémon Contest. Liko is selected to command all three Pokémon, with Navi acting as her coach. At the Contest, Liko becomes nervous after watching several skilled competitors, but her friends encourage her. During her performance, Meowscarada unexpectedly leaves the stage, forcing Liko to improvise with Skeledirge and Quaquaval. Meowscarada soon returns with Ditto, and the four Pokémon successfully perform the group's combination together, impressing the audience and judges. However, Liko is disqualified because Ditto was not registered as part of her team. One of the judges nevertheless praises the performance and gives Liko's group a special award for their creativity and teamwork. The Rising Volt Tacklers leave satisfied that they were able to share their performance with the audience.
1382	TBA	12	"Koraidon & Miraidon! The Great Race in Paldea"; Transliteration: "Koraidon & Miraidon! Paldea Dai Rēsu" (Japanese: コライドン＆ミライドン！ パルデア大レース)	Directed by : Akihiko Ōta & Studio PaTHoS; Storyboarded by : Masato Satō & Makoto Nakata	Daiki Tomiyasu	Kōki Yanagihara, Masaya Ōnishi, Toshiko Nakaya, Natsumi Hattori & A-Real	September 4, 2026	TBA
1383	TBA	13	"A Squishy Pokémon! If You Squish It and It Squishes, It's Squishy Time"; Transliteration: "Puni Puni Pokémon! Puniru Punireba Puniru Toki" (Japanese: プニプニポケモン！プニるプニればプニる時)	Yūji Asada	Deko Akao	Masaaki Iwane & Izumi Shimura	September 11, 2026	TBA
1384	TBA	14	"The Expanding World, GO with You!"; Transliteration: "Hirogaru Sekai, Kimi to GO!" (Japanese: 広がる世界、キミとＧＯ！)	Kyōhei Sumiyama	Kureha Matsuzawa	Kōki Yanagihara, Kenji Katō & Natsumi Hattori	September 18, 2026	TBA
1385	TBA	15	"Navi and the Mysterious Masked Child"; Transliteration: "Navi to Fushigi na Kamen no Ko" (Japanese: ナヴィと不思議な仮面の子)	Directed by : Hiromichi Matano; Storyboarded by : Yūko Kiyoshima & Shizuka Furumura	Naohiro Fukushima	Makoto Shinjō, Rie Eyama & Yuki Masuya	September 25, 2026	TBA
1386	TBA	16	"The Revered Companions Strike! Momowarou's Decision!!"; Transliteration: "Tomokko Shūrai! Momowarou no Ketsudan!!" (Japanese: ともっこ襲来！モモワロウの決断！！)	Directed by : Tenjūrō Tokoro; Storyboarded by : Yoshimi Katsumata	Naruki Nagakawa	Kōki Yanagihara & Natsumi Hattori	October 9, 2026	TBA
1387	TBA	17	"Paldea in Ruin: Resurrection"; Transliteration: "Saiyaku no Parudea — Fukkatsu" (Japanese: 災厄のパルデア ――復活)	Directed by : Yoshihiko Iwata & Megumi Matsumoto; Storyboarded by : Hiromasa Amano	Kureha Matsuzawa	Keita Hagiwara, Hiromi Niioka & Toshinari Abe	October 16, 2026	TBA
1388	TBA	18	"Paldea in Ruin: Charge"; Transliteration: "Saiyaku no Parudea — Bakushin" (Japanese: 災厄のパルデア ――驀進)	Yūji Asada	Kureha Matsuzawa	Masaaki Iwane & Izumi Shimura	October 23, 2026	TBA
1389	TBA	19	"Paldea in Ruin: Reunion"; Transliteration: "Saiyaku no Parudea — Saikai" (Japanese: 災厄のパルデア ――再会)	Directed by : Yusuke Oshida; Storyboarded by : Yusuke Oshida & Kentarō Tsubame	Kureha Matsuzawa	Yusuke Oshida, Yuzuko Hanai, Masaya Ōnishi, Takashi Shinohara, Keita Hagiwara, Izumi Shimura & Yasue Ōno	October 30, 2026	TBA
1390	TBA	20	"Syaritatsu, Order Up!"; Transliteration: "Sharitatsu, Itchō Agari!" (Japanese: シャリタツ、いっちょうあがり！)	TBA	TBA	TBA	November 6, 2026	TBA
1391	TBA	21	"Making a Magnificent Entrance! Dandy H!!"; Transliteration: "Karei ni Tōjō! Dandi H!!" (Japanese: 華麗に登場！ダンディH！！)	TBA	TBA	TBA	November 13, 2026	TBA
1392	TBA	22	"A Heart Burning with Passion Spreads Like Wildfire"; Transliteration: "Atsui Hāto wa Tobihi Shite" (Japanese: 熱いハートは飛び火して)	TBA	TBA	TBA	November 20, 2026	TBA
1393	TBA	23	"Uruto and Yamirami! A Bond More Solid Than Stone!!"; Transliteration: "Uruto to Yamirami! Ishi yori Katai Kizuna!!" (Japanese: ウルトとヤミラミ！石より固い絆！！)	TBA	TBA	TBA	November 27, 2026	TBA

== Release ==
On April 17, 2026, TV Tokyo announced that a new story arc of the Pokémon anime, titled "Wonder Voyage", would premiere on May 22. A promotional visual released alongside the announcement featured Liko, Roy, Dot and Ult, as well as a new female character and a Ditto. On May 8, The Pokémon Company released further information about the arc, identifying the new character as Navi and confirming that Liko, Roy, Dot and Ult would embark on a new adventure.

On October 6, 2026, The Pokémon Company's North American branch announced that a fourth season of Pokémon Horizons, titled Pokémon Horizons: Season 4 – Wonders Ahead, would premiere on the streaming service Netflix on February 27, 2027, in the United States.

== Music ==
The Japanese opening theme song is "Connecting the World" (セカイツナガレ, Sekai Tsunagare) by HoneyWorks. Its Japanese ending theme song is "Cutie Sphere" (キュートなキューたい, Kyūto-na Kyū-tai) by Cutie Street.
