= Pokémon Horizons – Rising Hope =

2026 season of Pokémon Horizons

- Season 28 (overall); Season 3 (Horizons)
- Pokémon Horizons – Rising Hope poster
- No. of episodes: 47

Release
- Original network: TV Tokyo
- Original release: April 11, 2025 – May 1, 2026

Season chronology
- ← Previous; Horizons – The Search for Laqua Next → Horizons – Wonders Ahead

Pokémon Horizons – Rising Hope, (Note: It is officially known as Pokémon Horizons: Season 3 – Rising Hope.) known in Japan as Pocket Monsters: Mega Voltage, (Note: Japanese: ポケットモンスター: メガボルテージ, Hepburn: Poketto Monsutā: Mega Borutēji) Pocket Monsters Episode: Mega Evolution (Note: Japanese: ポケットモンスター: エピソード：メガシンカ, Hepburn: Poketto Monsutā: Episōdo: Mega Shinka) and Pocket Monsters: Rising Again (Note: Japanese: ポケットモンスター: ライジングアゲイン, Hepburn: Poketto Monsutā: Raijin Guagein) is the twenty-eighth season of the Pokémon anime series and the third season of Pokémon Horizons: The Series, known in Japan as Pocket Monsters (ポケットモンスター, Poketto Monsutā). It is produced by OLM and directed by Daiki Tomiyasu (chief director) and Saori Den. The season aired in Japan on TV Tokyo from April 11, 2025, to May 1, 2026, and was distributed by Netflix in the United States from January 6 to September 18, 2026.

The season comprises three story arcs. The first arc, "Mega Voltage", covering the first 22 episodes, follows protagonists Liko and Roy, alongside Dot, as they reform the Rising Volt Tacklers, while joined by Roy's rival Ult, one year (Note: The timeskip is referred to as around three years by IGN.) after the collapse of Laqua. The second arc, "Episode: Mega Evolution", covering the next three episodes, shows how Roy and Ult met in the Kalos region. The third arc, "Rising Again", covering the final 22 episodes, follows the Rising Volt Tacklers as they attempt to expose the Explorers, destroy the Laquium, and clear their name.

== Episode list ==
Jap. overall	Eng. overall	No. in season	English title Japanese title	Directed by	Written by	Animation directed by	Original release date	English release date
1324	1313	1	"Eyes to the Skies Once Again, Part 1 (To the Skies Once More, Part 1)"; Transliteration: "Ōzora e Mukatte, Futatabi Zenpen" (Japanese: 大空へ向かって、再び前編)	Ayumi Moriyama	Dai Satō	Yoshitaka Yanagihara, Toshiko Nakaya, Hiromi Niioka, Masaya Onishi, Hattori Natsumi & Yusuke Oshida	April 11, 2025 (Note: These episodes were broadcast as part of an hour-long special.)	October 27, 2025 (UK); January 6, 2026 (US)
Over a year later, Roy is still actively searching for the Black Rayquaza. However, he receives a call from Dot, who informs him that the Laquium has not completely disappeared. Roy encounters a Slaking that is acting strangely, but he is interrupted by a boy named Ult, who declares that the Black Rayquaza will be his. Ult's Sableye provokes the Slaking, making it hostile. After a battle, the Slaking is defeated. That night, Roy sneaks away from Ult. Meanwhile, Liko is at Indigo Academy and has a conversation with her friend Ann. The following day, on a rooftop, Liko hears someone and looks up to see Roy and Cap.
1325	1314	2	"Eyes to the Skies Once Again, Part 2 (To the Skies Once More, Part 2)"; Transliteration: "Ōzora e Mukatte, Futatabi Kōhen" (Japanese: 大空へ向かって、再び後編)	Masatsune Oi	Dai Satō	Yuki Kitajima, Kiah Chen, Brokerage, Lu Qing Yun, Kennedy Freeman, Imani Brown, Federico Iglesias, Park Song Hwa, Heo Jae Young, Park Ji-yun, Kim Jeong-woo & Noeko Kashiuchi	April 11, 2025	October 27, 2025 (UK); January 6, 2026 (US)
Liko and Roy talk with Ann about what happened at Laqua. Despite their efforts, they couldn't find their missing member, and the Rising Volt Tacklers disbanded. To cheer them up, Ann suggests a battle. Roy defeats Ann's Samurott, then asks Liko to battle. She agrees, but her Meowscarada is defeated. Later, several students ask Roy if he is part of the Rising Volt Tacklers. He does not deny it, prompting them to talk to Liko, who proudly confirms she is a member. At a bus stop, Liko meets Roy and joins him to uncover the truth about the Explorers. Meanwhile, Spinel has captured the Six Heroes, except the Black Rayquaza.
1326	1315	3	"Following Traces of Laquium (Follow the Rakurium Signs)"; Transliteration: "Rakuriumu Sain o Otte" (Japanese: ラクリウム・サインを追って)	Yūji Asada	Dai Satō	Masaaki Iwane & Izumi Shimura	April 18, 2025	October 27, 2025 (UK); January 6, 2026 (US)
After searching for Roy at a train station, Ult spots him with Liko. They contact Dot, who informs them of the next Laquium sighting. Liko and Roy search for the Laquium, unaware that Ult is following them. He falls into a hole and encounters an aggressive Steelix. Liko and Roy engage in a battle, and another Steelix joins the fray. They notice the two Steelix start fighting each other before turning their attention to Liko. Just then, Pagogo emerges from its Poké Ball and saves her, much to her delight. After Hattrem calms the situation with Heal Pulse, Roy introduces Ult to Liko. Meanwhile, Hamber assigns Zirc and Onia a mission to find Gibeon's White Zygarde using the Zygarde Cube.
1327	1316	4	"Clash of the Nidothing Fans! (Super-Stans?! A Gurumin Fan Battle!!)"; Transliteration: "Gachi Oshi!? Gurumin Fan Taiketsu!!"" (Japanese: ガチ推し！？ぐるみんファン対決！！)	Directed by : Chiko Ueda; Storyboarded by : Hiromasa Amano	Kureha Matsuzawa	Yusuke Oshida & Toshinari Abe	April 25, 2025	October 27, 2025 (UK); January 6, 2026 (US)
The trio travels to Teacup Town, where they meet a girl named Litten Smitten, who is a big fan of Nidothing. After Roy indirectly reveals that he was a part of the Rising Volt Tacklers, Litten Smitten immediately refuses to help them find the last sighting of the Black Rayquaza. She then challenges Liko to a battle with her Incineroar. However, during the fight, Ult interferes after running from a group of Dodrio, including a pack of Fearow. After calming them down with a song, Litten Smitten, who saw Liko and Roy try not to hurt any of the Fearow and now believes Rising Volt Tacklers are actually good guys, admits that she hasn't seen the Black Rayquaza and only wants Nidothing's attention, leaving the group disappointed. However, Nidothing understands her. The group then continues their journey.
1328	1317	5	"The Pokémon Center Lady"; Transliteration: "Pokémon Center no Oneesan" (Japanese: ポケモンセンターのお姉さん)	Directed by : Yasuhiro Noda; Storyboarded by : Yūji Asada & Ichizō Kobayashi	Kureha Matsuzawa	Keita Hagiwara, Natsumi Hattori, Yumi Sakai, Megumi Matsumoto, Izumi Shimura, Lu Laforte & A-Real	May 2, 2025	October 27, 2025 (UK); January 6, 2026 (US)
At a Pokémon Center, Mollie, now working as a nurse, sees that a group of Pokémon has been injured in a forest and rushes to help them. Meanwhile, after overhearing someone explain what is happening in the forest, Liko and Roy decide to check it out for themselves. There, they come across Mollie and have a conversation. In a flashback, after the team discusses their futures and accepts that there is nothing more for them to do, the Rising Volt Tacklers disband. Shortly after, they encounter more Pokémon affected by poison and eventually spot a Vileplume that has been affected by Laquium. After battling the Vileplume, Hattrem learns Healing Wish to calm it down. Following that, Cap spots a facility belonging to Exceed.
1329	1318	6	"The Strong Sphere"; Transliteration: "Strong Sphere" (Japanese: ストロングスフィア)	Directed by : Hiromichi Matano; Storyboarded by : Satoshi Shimizu	Naruki Nagakawa	Makoto Shinjō, Rie Eyama, Alliance & Sakuya Ave	May 9, 2025	October 27, 2025 (UK); January 6, 2026 (US)
Arriving at the site, Liko and Roy spot Ult exiting a bus. Nearly mistaken by a security guard, they head inside, where they see a former student named Dash defeating an Exceed employee with her Swanna using a Strong Sphere. Shortly after, Coral and Sidian appear on the battlefield. The latter notices Liko and Roy and alerts Coral, inviting them to join the battle. Liko and Roy are overpowered by Coral and Sidian and are defeated. However, Ult steps in, breaks the Strong Sphere he had taken earlier, and escapes with Liko and Roy. Pagogo then senses something coming from a cave, prompting the trio to decide to explore it.
1330	1319	7	"Crash! Team Dragon Rampage! (Clash! The Dragon Speed Gang)"; Transliteration: "Gekitotsu! Doragon Bakusōdan" (Japanese: 激突！ドラゴン爆走団)	Directed by : Yoshihiko Iwata; Storyboarded by : Hiromasa Amano	Kimiko Ueno	Kōki Yanagihara, Toshiko Nakaya, Masaya Ōnishi, Izumi Shimura & A-Real	May 16, 2025	October 27, 2025 (UK); January 6, 2026 (US)
Liko, Roy, and Ult see that Pagogo is attentive toward a mountain. On their way, they decided to build a campfire and sleep in for the night. In the morning, the trio is warned by a traveler about Team Dragon Rampage, whom they later encounter, with three masked people each riding a Cyclizar. They believe that Roy is a part of Team Wriggle, their rival, resulting in a battle before taking off. Later on, the group sees someone stealing a Dratini and placing it into a cage. They then battle the person, who is a member of Team Wriggle, and are able to defeat them, rescuing the eggs. The gang lets the group see the Black Rayquaza, but Ult is left unimpressed. Meanwhile, Dot receives a call from Iono.
1331	1320	8	"The Prankster (The Mischievous Maggyo's Lovely Smile?)"; Transliteration: "Itazura Maggyo no Ii Egao?" (Japanese: いたずらマッギョのイイ笑顔？)	Yūji Asada	Naohiro Fukushima	Masaaki Iwane & Izumi Shimura	May 30, 2025	October 27, 2025 (UK); January 6, 2026 (US)
Dot receives a call from Iono and travels to Levincia to investigate a prankster scaring Pokémon. She discovers a Stunfisk enhanced by a Strong Sphere, used by a trainer named Stunner Fisk to create viral videos. Dot battles him, during which her Tinkatuff learns Metal Claw and Terastallizes into a Steel type. After winning, Dot convinces Stunner Fisk to stop using the Strong Sphere, and she heads to Cortondo to rejoin Liko and Roy.
1332	1321	9	"Reunion in Cortondo (Cercle Town, Site of Reunions!)"; Transliteration: "Saikai no Serukuru Taun!" (Japanese: 再会のセルクルタウン！)	Directed by : Yoshihiko Iwata; Storyboarded by : Suzu	Deko Akao	Yusuke Oshida, Toshinari Abe, Dong Li Ze, Shen Tao Yi, X10, Chen Liang, He Ye, Yu Hui Yun, Luo Rui, Ryōta Kurata, A-Real & Lu Laforte	June 6, 2025	October 27, 2025 (UK); January 6, 2026 (US)
Liko, Roy, Dot, and Ult arrive in Cortondo to meet Murdock and share news that the Rising Volt Tacklers have been re-formed. They also reveal their investigation into Laquium, which unsettles Murdock. During their visit, Gym Leader Katy challenges Liko to a battle, setting the stage for a showdown in the heart of Cortondo.
1333	1322	10	"Orla, Grounded (A Flightless Orio and...)" Transliteration: "Tobenai Orio to" (Japanese: 飛べないオリオと)	Directed by : Hye Jin Seo; Storyboarded by : Ichizō Kobayashi	Kureha Matsuzawa	Jin Zhong	June 13, 2025	October 27, 2025 (UK); January 6, 2026 (US)
Liko, Roy, Dot, and Ult travel to Galar to visit Orla at Karna's Poke Ball factory, hoping she'll build them an airship. When they ask, she refuses, telling them to look elsewhere. Disheartened and unsure what to do next, they press on—until Cap senses something in a nearby forest. They rush after him, discovering to their surprise that the Brave Olivine airship they thought had been dismantled is actually still intact and waiting for them.
1334	1323	11	"We Are the Rising Volt Tacklers! (We Are the Rising Volteccers!)"; Transliteration: "Warera Raijingu Borutekkāzu!" (Japanese: 我らライジングボルテッカーズ！)	Kyōhei Sumiyama	Kureha Matsuzawa	Natsumi Hattori, Megumi Matsumoto & Yutsuko Hanai	June 20, 2025	October 27, 2025 (UK); January 6, 2026 (US)
Two members of the Explorers, Indi and Rubina, challenge the group for a battle with their Paldean Tauros. They are then defeated and take off without the Strong Spheres. Not long after, Orla asks the group for three days to make sure that Brave Olivine is in good condition, in which they agree to help clean up. Later, Dot receives an undisclosed voice message, where they are astounded upon hearing Friede's voice. After finishing the message, everyone celebrates with Ult officially joining them. Eventually, the Brave Olivine takes off for the first time in over a year.
1335	1324	12	"Terastallization vs. Mega Evolution! (Fight! Terastallization VS Mega Evolution!!)"; Transliteration: "Tatakae! Terasutaru tai Megashinka!!" (Japanese: 闘え！テラスタル対メガシンカ！！)	Directed by : Yasunori Gotō; Storyboarded by : Hiromasa Amano	Dai Satō	Kōki Yanagihara & Masaya Ōnishi	June 27, 2025	January 6, 2026 (US); February 27, 2026 (UK)
Liko, Roy, Dot, and Ult visit Naranja Academy, where they discuss the sightings of Laquium. Later on, Nemona challenges Roy for a double battle. During the battle, Roy mega evolves his Lucario, while Nemona terastallizes her Pawmot. Eventually, Mega Lucario overpowers Pawmot, leading to Roy's victory.
1336	1325	13	"The Knight in the Ruins (The Knight Encountered in the Ruins)"; Transliteration: "Iseki de Deatta Kishi" (Japanese: 遺跡で出逢った騎士)	Directed by : Chiko Ueta; Storyboarded by : Daigo Kinoshita	Dai Satō	Takashi Shinohara, Toshinari Abe, Natsumi Hattori, Yoshitaka Yanagihara, Lu Laforte & Revival	July 4, 2025	February 27, 2026 (UK); March 20, 2026 (US)
Penny challenges Dot to a double battle, which Dot loses. Following that, the group explores the area where Laquium was last reported, with Liko meeting Pepper, who is looking for his Scovillain, whom she later sees rampaging. As her Meowscarada is overwhelmed by Scovillain's attacks, Pagogo and a Charcadet arrive and defeat Scovillain, who is then reunited with its trainer. Shortly after, Liko catches Charcadet.
1337	1326	14	"Nidothing Love! (Stay Ablaze, My Love for Gurumin!)"; Transliteration: "Moyase, Gurumin Ai!" (Japanese: 燃やせ、ぐるみん愛！)	Yūji Asada	Naohiro Fukushima	Masaaki Iwane & Izumi Shimura	July 18, 2025	February 27, 2026 (UK); March 20, 2026 (US)
Seeing Nidothing announce a collaboration event with Iono, Liko becomes excited. Meanwhile, Zirc, who is with Onia, expresses his excitement about the event. The next day, Zirc receives his ticket, only for a gust of wind to blow it away into a drain. Later, the group comes across the duo, whom they agree to help find his ticket. At a beach, they see a Wugtrio holding Zirc's ticket. After battling it, they retrieve the ticket and attend the event. Zirc becomes shocked after realizing that Nidothing is actually Dot. Then, Zirc and Onia ask Liko to join them in their search for Amethio.
1338	1327	15	"Charcadet's Wish! (Carbon Wish)"; Transliteration: "Carbou no Negai" (Japanese: カルボウの願い)	Directed by : Yoshihiko Iwata, Makoto Nakata, Limthong Chidphong & Misu Yamaneko; Storyboarded by : Ichizō Kobayashi & Saori Den	Kureha Matsuzawa	Yusuke Oshida, Shūhei Yasuda, Masaya Ōnishi, Natsumi Hattori, Megumi Matsumoto, Yasue Ōno & A-Real	August 1, 2025	February 27, 2026 (UK); March 20, 2026 (US)
With Zirc and Onia, Liko visits Amethio's mansion. After receiving information about Amethio's whereabouts on an island, the trio heads to the location by boat. While talking with Amethio, Liko's Charcadet asks Amethio's Ceruledge for a battle, which Charcadet loses but receives praise from Liko and her team. Seeing this, Amethio decides to head out to find something that he enjoys.
1339	1328	16	"Riding the Waves (Surfugo Goes Surfing After the Storm)"; Transliteration: "Arashi Nochi Naminori Sāfugō" (Japanese: 嵐のち波乗りサーフゴー)	Directed by : Hiromichi Matano; Storyboarded by : Hiroshi Aoyama	Kimiko Ueno	Makoto Shinjō, Rie Eyama & Yuki Masutani	August 8, 2025	February 27, 2026 (UK); March 20, 2026 (US)
While flying to a nearby island, Amethio and his Corviknight are caught in a storm until Mighty G and his Sharpedo arrive to help and bring him to a cave. Inside, Mighty G helps Amethio learn how to dry his clothes properly before cooking a pot of curry. Meanwhile, after the storm passes, the Rising Volt Tacklers go to a beach, where a group of people are waiting for a Gholdengo to arrive so they can surf with it. There, Dot becomes controlled by a Gimmighoul, whom she rescues later on. After that, she catches Gimmighoul.
1340	1329	17	"The Dusk Ball That Wouldn't Open (Mega Awesome?! The Off-Limits Dark Ball)"; Transliteration: "Mega Sugeē!? Akazu no Dāku Bōru" (Japanese: メガすげぇ！？開かずのダークボール)	Directed by : Yoshihiko Iwata; Storyboarded by : Yūko Kiyoshima	Deko Akao	Megumi Matsumoto, Natsumi Hattori & Masaya Ōnishi	August 15, 2025	February 27, 2026 (UK); March 20, 2026 (US)
After getting into an argument with Roy, Ult angrily storms out of the Brave Olivine and goes to Manpūku Town, where he meets Ryan and his Grafaiai. After spending some time together, Ryan brings Ult to his treehouse. The next day, Ult discovers Ryan and his Dusk Ball are missing and goes to find it, where he spots Ryan trading it for a Strong Sphere. Then, Indi and Rubina arrive, and Ult immediately challenges them to a battle. Just as his Sableye is about to get defeated, a Dragonite comes out from the Dusk Ball and saves Sableye before attacking both of Indi and Rubina's Darmanitans. Ult then chases after a truck as Roy comes across Ryan.
1341	1330	18	"Friends as Two, Me and You (The Two of Us, As Friends)"; Transliteration: "Futari, Tomo to Shite" (Japanese: ふたり、友として)	Directed by : Misu Yamaneko; Storyboarded by : Mei Aratani, Yuri Isowa, Saori Den & Yusuke Oshida	Kureha Matsuzawa	Yusuke Oshida, Takashi Shinohara, Kenji Katō, Toshinari Abe & Nao Ikehara	August 22, 2025	February 27, 2026 (UK); March 20, 2026 (US)
Ult loses sight of the truck, but later spots Indi and Rubina entering a base. However, Spinel's Beheeyem notices them as Ult pushes Sableye away, allowing it to escape, who runs into Roy. He is transported to a room by the Explorers, and upon entering in, tries to send out his Dragonite, who doesn't respond. Just then, Roy rescues Ult, only for Indi and Rubina to catch them. Indi and Rubina use their Strong Spheres on their Darmanitans, giving them the advantage against Roy and Ult. During the battle, Ult mega evolves his Dragonite, defeating Indi and Rubina. Leaving the base, Ult swears to protect those that he cares about the most.
1342	1331	19	"Taking the Next Steps (Diana Comes Back!!!!)"; Transliteration: "Daiana Kamuzu Bakku!!!!" (Japanese: ダイアナ・カムズ・バック！！！！)	Directed by : Chiko Ueta; Storyboarded by : Ichizō Kobayashi	Kureha Matsuzawa	Jin Zhong	August 29, 2025	February 27, 2026 (UK); March 20, 2026 (US)
In a desert, Diana pays a visit to Liko, Roy, Dot, and Ult, where they have a discussion regarding Pagogo's power. Later, the group watches as Liko's Charcadet and Roy's Crocalor battle each other, and Diana suggests a training session for Charcadet. In their double battle, Charcadet defends Meowscarada from multiple attacks. After Moewscarada similarly protects Charcadet from Wash Rotom's Hydro Pump, Diana asks Charcadet to start trusting its team members more. Shortly after, Charcadet defeats Wash Rotom but gets knocked out by Arcanine. After that, the group decides to go and save the Six Heroes.
1343	1332	20	"Tinkatuff's Hammer Wasn't Made in a Year! (How Nakanuchan Makes the Ultimate Hammer)"; Transliteration: "Nakanuchan, Saikyō Hanmā no Tsukurikata" (Japanese: ナカヌチャン、最強ハンマーの作り方)	Yūji Asada	Kimiko Ueno	Masaaki Iwane & Izumi Shimura	September 5, 2025	February 27, 2026 (UK); March 20, 2026 (US)
While watching Coral and Sidian promoting the Strong Spheres, Liko receives a message from Cervantis, who asks them to meet him at a base. Meanwhile, Gimmighoul becomes disappointed when Dot and Quaxwell don't pay attention before seeing Tinkatuff in a scrapyard. Initially saddened by the iron being taken by the workers, Tinkatuff later spots it and jumps off the Brave Olivine to retrieve it. Dot, who realizes Tinkatuff's disappearance, leaves the ship to find her. Tinkatuff then knocks down a Corviknight, carrying Coral and Sidian, who challenge Dot to a battle. During the battle, Tinkatuff evolves into Tinkaton, who sends Coral's Glalie flying, just as Liko, Roy, and Ult arrive to meet Indi and Rubina.
1344	1333	21	"The Six Heroes Unleashed! (The Six Heroes Bare Their Fangs)"; Transliteration: "Kiba o Muku Rokueiyū" (Japanese: 牙を剥く六英雄)	Directed by : Yoshihiko Iwata; Storyboarded by : Hiroshi Aoyama	Kureha Matsuzawa	Yoshitaka Yanagihara, Toshiko Nakaya, Yusuke Oshida & Megumi Matsumoto	September 12, 2025	February 27, 2026 (UK); March 20, 2026 (US)
At the base, Liko, Roy, and Ult encounter Indi and Rubina, who reveal that the message was a trap, before unveiling five of the Six Heroes, whom they proceed to use Super Strong Spheres on. The group instantly becomes overwhelmed by the Six Heroes's power. Concurrently, Dot meets Hamber and heads out to a building. On their way, however, they come across Chalce and her Medicham. Medicham successfully dodges Tinkaton's attacks multiple times. Despite this, Tinkaton proceeds to learns Gigaton Hammer and knocks Medicham out with one hit. Meanwhile, Liko and Roy terastallize Meowscarada and Crocalor, saving time for Pagogo to purify the Laquium from the Six Heroes. However, Indi and Rubina use the Super Strong Spheres again, much to the group's horror.
1345	1334	22	"Better, Farther, Stronger! (Strive for Greater Heights with Unwavering Strength)"; Transliteration: "Tsuyoku, Takami o Mezashite" (Japanese: 強く、高みを目指して)	Directed by : Kyōhei Sumiyama; Storyboarded by : Hiromasa Amano	Kureha Matsuzawa	Hiromi Niioka, Toshinari Abe, Kenji Katō, Megumi Matsumoto & Toshiya Yamada	September 19, 2025	February 27, 2026 (UK); March 20, 2026 (US)
Stronger than before, the Six Heroes overpower Liko, Roy, and Ult. Shortly after, Amethio rushes in with his Corviknight and 10% Forme White Zygarde. Despite their efforts, the Six Heroes successfully defeat them, leaving Liko to beg them to stop. Much to their shock, the Laquium wears off as they collapse. Spinel orders for the Explorers to retreat, bringing the Six Heroes with them. Dot shows up as Cervantis apologizes for not being able to help. Amethio furiously yells at Cervantis and hearing his speech, Cervantis became motivated to help them out. Ult decides to train harder, and after receiving a call from Briar, who invites them to Blueberry Academy, the group heads back to the Brave Olivine.
1346	1335	23	"Mega Evolution - Roy (Roy – Training)"; Transliteration: "Roi —— Shugyō" (Japanese: ロイ ——修行)	Directed by : Kyōhei Sumiyama; Storyboarded by : Satoru Iriyoshi	Kureha Matsuzawa	Yoshitaka Yanagihara & Hiromi Niioka	October 10, 2025	February 27, 2026 (UK); June 26, 2026 (US)
After witnessing a battle between Roy and Ult, Liko becomes curious about how Roy met Lucario. Roy starts explaining his story about his adventure at Lumiose City. After arriving at Prism Tower, Roy bumps into Ult, leading to a brief argument. Roy and Ult then watch a battle between two trainers, who both Mega Evolve their Gardevoir and Slowbro, respectively. After that, they meet Master Mayonnaise, who takes them to a cafe and talk about Mega Evolution. Master Mayonnaise suggests Roy and Ult visit the Mayo Maze Palace and challenge the Yellow Flash, a Lucario, whom they meet later on. They are stunned when the Yellow Flash easily defeats their Crocalor and Sableye.
1347	1336	24	"Mega Evolution - Ult (Ult – Strongest)"; Transliteration: "Ult —— Saikyō" (Japanese: ウルト ——最強)	Directed by : Misu Yamaneko; Storyboarded by : Hiromasa Amano	Kureha Matsuzawa	Yasue Ōno & Natsumi Hattori	October 17, 2025	February 27, 2026 (UK); June 26, 2026 (US)
While having dinner prepared by Emma, Roy and Ult talk about their defeat by the Yellow Flash. However, the power unexpectedly goes out, so Emma brings out her Ampharos and Mega Evolves it to restore the electricity. After that, Emma became surprised at Ult's determination to catch the Black Rayquaza. Telling Roy that she took Ult in during a rainstorm, she believes that he could be friends with him. The following day, Master Mayonnaise recommends a battle to unite their feelings with their Pokémon. Ult loses and briefly refuses to accept defeat until Master Mayonnaise reveals his flaws and asks him to drop Mega Evolution since their bond is not strong enough. Just then, the Yellow Flash asks Roy and Ult to return to Mayo Maze Palace, where they run into Count Hoisin and Shōyu.
1348	1337	25	"Mega Evolution – Bonds"; Transliteration: "Mega Shinka —— Kizuna" (Japanese: メガシンカ ——絆)	Directed by : Makoto Nakata; Storyboarded by : Makoto Nakata	Kureha Matsuzawa	Shūhei Yasuda & Takashi Shinohara	October 24, 2025	February 27, 2026 (UK); June 26, 2026 (US)
Roy and Ult face off against Count Hoisin and Shōyu. During their match, Roy notices their competitors working together and urges Ult that they could do the same. Just then, Shōyu's Accelgor uses Shadow Divide to knock Sableye out of the battle, leaving him irritated. Roy then wins the battle, allowing the duo to battle the Yellow Flash. After a fierce battle, Roy's Crocalor defeats the Yellow Flash, much to their joy. Then, the Yellow Flash expresses an interest in joining his team, which Roy accepts and catches it.
1349	1338	26	"Welcome to Blueberry Academy! (Tera☆Sparkle! Blueberry Academy)"; Transliteration: "Tera☆Kira! Blueberry Gakuen" (Japanese: テラ☆キラ！ブルーベリー学園)	Directed by : Hiroyuki Okuno; Storyboarded by : Kentarō Tsubame	Dai Satō	Yoshitaka Yanagihara & Masaya Ōnishi	October 31, 2025	May 25, 2026 (UK); June 26, 2026 (US)
At Blueberry Academy, Nemona and Cyrano watch a double battle between Ann and Lacey. After landing the Brave Olivine in front of the school, they receive a greeting from Cyrano. Briar asks them to visit her office the next day. Afterward, Lacey gives them a tour of the Terarium Dome before bringing them to the Center Square. Liko reunites with Ann, and Nemona excitedly challenges Roy to a double battle, which he loses. Ult asks Nemona for a match, but is unable to as she is set to return to Paldea. With Ann recommending Lacey to help the group, Liko, Roy, Dot, and Ult start their training sessions.
1350	1339	27	"Terarium Training! (Training Begins! Terarium Dome)"; Transliteration: "Shugyō Kaishi! Terariumu Dōmu" (Japanese: 修行開始！テラリウムドーム)	Directed by : Hiromichi Matano; Storyboarded by : Yuri Isowa & Moe Araya	Dai Satō	Makoto Shinjo, Rie Eyama & Yuki Masutani	November 7, 2025	May 25, 2026 (UK); June 26, 2026 (US)
The group meets Briar and Carmine, her assistant. Lacey asks the group to battle multiple Pokémon; Liko and Dot engage in a match with a Pyroar and Crabrawler, respectively, while Ult's Sableye is attacked by an Overqwil. Lacey gives Ult some advice, but he runs away from her. Relaxing with his team, Roy meets Drayton. Requesting him to help, Drayton agrees but is confronted by Lacey for using him to complete his tasks. Inside a cave, Ult battles a Galvantula. Lacey scolds him for not using her previous advice, prompting him to run away again. At the Polar Plaza, Roy and Drayton have their double battle, which Roy loses. Ult comes across Lacey, who asks him to study with her.
1351	1340	28	"Ult-imate Training (Quiz Time! What is Ult's Training?)"; Transliteration: "Kuizu Desu! Ult No Shugyō Wa Nan Deshou?" (Japanese: クイズです！ウルトの修行はなんでしょう？)	Directed by : Misu Yamaneko; Storyboarded by : Hiroshi Aoyama	Naohiro Fukushima	Takashi Shinohara, Keita Hagiwara & Megumi Matsumoto	November 14, 2025	May 25, 2026 (UK); June 26, 2026 (US)
The focus shifts to the brash young trainer Ult, who undergoes a grueling trial in the Blueberry Academy Terarium supervised by Elite Four member Lacey. Instead of a standard battle, Lacey tests Ult's fundamental knowledge and strategy through a strict Pokémon pop quiz covering move mechanics and type matchups, specifically focusing on Excadrill's claw moves and Tera Type. The academic trial translates into practical combat, forcing Ult to rely on disciplined tactics like Drill and Tera Blast rather than raw power. Ultimately, the intense session humbles Ult, prompting him to fix his battling fundamentals and commit to training more cooperatively with Roy and the rest of the group.
1352	1341	29	"Liko and Hattrem, Bonded by Happiness! (Liko and Tebrim - The Bond of Happiness!)"; Transliteration: "Riko To Teburimu, Shiawase No Kizuna!" (Japanese: リコとテブリム、幸せの絆！)	Directed by : Yōsuke Fujino; Storyboarded by : Hiromasa Amano	Deko Akao	Zhong Jin	November 21, 2025	May 25, 2026 (UK); June 26, 2026 (US)
Liko becomes deeply concerned that her Hattrem is suppressing its own desires, noting how it constantly yields food and attention to team-mates Charcadet and Meowscarada. However, her friend Ann offers a refreshing perspective based on her own upbringing as a middle child, explaining that Hattrem isn't holding back out of sadness, but rather acts purely out of a deep-seated love to make its team-mates happy. Realising she misunderstood her partner's selfless nature, Liko tearfully expresses her immense love and gratitude directly to the Serene Pokémon during a sandwich-making session. This powerful emotional breakthrough causes Hattrem to weep tears of pure joy and unexpectedly evolve into Hatterene. Empowered by her new evolution, Hatterene immediately steps up to confidently lead the group through a cave while tracking down a wild Ditto.
1353	1342	30	"Don't Give Up, Crocalor! (Give it Your All, Crocalor - For the Sake of Tomorrow)"; Transliteration: "Funbare Achikēta, Ashita No Tame Ni" (Japanese: ふんばれアチケータ、明日のために)	Yūji Asada	Naruki Nagakawa	Masaaki Iwane & Izumi Shimura	November 28, 2025	May 25, 2026 (UK); June 26, 2026 (US)
The narrative spotlight focuses heavily on Roy as he, Crocalor, and Kilowattrel prepare to face Blueberry Academy Elite Four member Drayton in a highly anticipated, spirited rematch. Feeling the intense pressure of the battle and struggling to keep pace, Crocalor begins to falter, forcing Roy to find a new way to tap into his partner's latent potential and inner drive. Through sheer determination and emotional resonance, Roy rallies his partner's spirits, leading to a powerful breakthrough where Crocalor pushes past its limits to unleash devastating new power. The intense conflict ultimately serves as a major turning point for Roy's growth as a trainer, solidifying his bond with his team and setting the stage for their upcoming challenges against the Explorers.
1354	1343	31	"Dot and Penny's Top-Secret Mission! (Dot & Botan! A Top Secret Operation)"; Transliteration: "Dotto & Botan! Gokuhi Daisakusen" (Japanese: ドット&ボタン！極秘大作戦)	Directed by : Kyōhei Sumiyama; Storyboarded by : Daigo Kinoshita	Michihiro Tsuchiya	STUDIO MASSKET	December 5, 2025	May 25, 2026 (UK); June 26, 2026 (US)
The narrative focus shifts entirely to Dot as she partners up with the tech-savvy Paldean trainer Penny. Together, the duo embarks on a stealthy, high-stakes operation to infiltrate Exceed's heavily guarded server room in order to extract critical data about the threat of Laquium. Navigating tight security and hacking past complex digital defenses, Dot must rely on her precise technical acumen and quick strategic thinking alongside Penny to bypass unexpected obstacles [m002w358, m002w358]. This perilous intelligence-gathering mission adds crucial context to the overarching conflict, pushing Dot out of her usual comfort zone and providing the Rising Volt Tacklers with vital information needed for their impending clashes.
1355	1344	32	"The Catcher in the Sky"; Transliteration: "Kyatchā In Za Sukai" (Japanese: キャッチャー・イン・ザ・スカイ)	Directed by : Makoto Nakata; Storyboarded by : Daiki Tomiyasu	Kureha Matsuzawa	Toshinari Abe, Yasue Ōno & Kenji Kato	December 12, 2025	May 25, 2026 (UK); June 26, 2026 (US)
A routine return turns into a high-stakes emergency when Friede's space capsule malfunctions during atmospheric re-entry. Plummeting dangerously toward Earth, Friede faces a critical, life-threatening situation as ground defenses and standard rescue protocols struggle to cope with the speed of the descent. Refusing to stand by, Liko, Roy, Dot, and the rest of the Rising Volt Tacklers instantly coordinate an intense, high-altitude rescue operation to intercept the falling capsule. By combining their Pokémon's unique abilities and pushing their aerial tactics to the absolute limit, the team manages to safely secure Friede and avert a total catastrophe. This gripping ordeal reinforces the unbreakable bond within the group, serving as a powerful reminder of how far they have grown as a collaborative unit.
1356	1345	33	"Roy vs. Friede: Wings of Fire! (Red-Hot Wings! Roy VS Friede)"; Transliteration: "Shakunetsu no Tsubasa! Roi VS Furiido" (Japanese: 灼熱の翼！ロイVSフリード)	Directed by : Yoshihiko Iwata; Storyboarded by : Shoji Nishida	Kureha Matsuzawa	Hiromi Niioka, Yoshitaka Yanagihara, Masaya Ōnishi & Megumi Matsumoto	December 19, 2025	May 25, 2026 (UK); June 26, 2026 (US)
A high-stakes ultimate test is issued to determine the very fate and future of the Rising Volt Tacklers. Roy must face his mentor Friede in an intense, emotional battle where a loss means the group will be completely disbanded. Pushing through the immense pressure, Roy coordinates fiercely with his recently empowered Skeledurge, strategically shifting tactics with Flame Charge, Disarming Voice, and Dragon Claw to match Friede's seasoned combat experience. This dramatic trial by fire serves as a definitive validation of how much Roy and his Pokémon have grown, solidifying their resolve just as the team prepares to advance toward their next major objectives.
1357	1346	34	"Mochi Mayhem! (Shock and Horrors! Kibikibi Panic on the Ship)"; Transliteration: "Senritsu! Senjō no Kibikibi Panic" (Japanese: 戦慄！ 船上のキビキビパニック)	Chiko Ueta	Kimiko Ueno	Yuki Masutani, Megumi Matsumoto & X10	January 9, 2026	May 25, 2026 (UK); June 26, 2026 (US)
The peaceful atmosphere following Roy's victory is completely upended when a mysterious and unsettling force takes control of the ship. The Rising Volt Tacklers suddenly lose control of their actions and begin dancing mindlessly to an infectious rhythm, plunging the crew into bizarre kitchen chaos and structural panic. The source of this strange curse traces back to the lingering, hidden influence of the mythical Pokémon Pecharunt, whose specialized psychological manipulation subtly mirrors its dark origins from the Kitakami region. Left with no choice but to break the spell, Liko, Roy, and Dot must combine their Pokémon's unique talents and act fast to neutralise the dancing pandemic before the entire crew is permanently hypnotised.
1358	1347	35	"Operation Infiltration! (Storming Explorers Headquarters!)"; Transliteration: "Totsunyū! Explorers Honbu" (Japanese: 突入！エクスプローラーズ本部)	Directed by : Michihiro Satō; Storyboarded by : Hiromasa Amano	Kureha Matsuzawa	Megumi Matsumoto & Toshiko Nakaya	January 23, 2026	July 20, 2026 (UK); September 18, 2026 (US)
The plot reaches a high-stakes dramatic peak as the overarching narrative takes a thrilling turn with a highly unexpected alliance. To the surprise of the team, the former Explorers rival Amethio joins forces with Liko, Roy, Dot, and their friends. Together, the group launches a perilous undercover mission to stealthily break into the heavily fortified Explorers' headquarters. The narrative shifts between strategic teamwork and close encounters with guards, building intense pressure as they navigate the fortress to uncover deeply guarded secrets regarding the mysterious, dangerous substance Laquium. This explosive operation forces former enemies to trust one another, pushing the protagonists out of their depth and setting up a monumental shift in the balance of power for future battles.
1359	1348	36	"Battle for the Six Heroes! (Get Back the Six Heroes!)"; Transliteration: "Rokueiyū o Torimodose!" (Japanese: 六英雄を取り戻せ！)	Yūji Asada	Kureha Matsuzawa	Masaaki Iwane & Izumi Shimura	January 30, 2026	July 20, 2026 (UK); September 18, 2026 (US)
The infiltration reaches a chaotic climax inside the Explorers' headquarters as the team gets completely split up and forced into intense one-on-one combat to free the captured Six Heroes. Amethio reveals his incredible trump card by unleashing a captured White Zygarde, while Roy achieves a spectacular breakthrough by Terastallizing his Kilowattrel into an Electric Tera Type to master the devastating move Supercell Slam. By combining their newly evolved powers, the Rising Volt Tacklers successfully shatter the Explorers' containment, freeing Lucius's legendary Pokémon with a solemn promise to reunite at Laqua. However, the victory is instantly cut short when the sinister Spinel frames the heroes on a global broadcast, turning public opinion entirely against them.
1360	1349	37	"Strong Bonds, Can't Lose! (A Battle We Can't Afford to Lose! Bonds Get Put to the Test!!)"; Transliteration: "Makerarenai Batoru! Tamesareru Kizuna!!" (Japanese: 負けられないバトル！試される絆！！)	Directed by : Yoshihiko Iwata; Storyboarded by : Yūko Kiyoshima	Naruki Nagakawa	N/A	February 6, 2026	July 20, 2026 (UK); September 18, 2026 (US)
The severe fallout of Spinel's global framing forces the publicly branded Rising Volt Tacklers into hiding to plan their next move. Seeking a secure environment away from the media storm, the group arrives at the Naranja Academy battle facilities in Paldea, where Liko, Roy, and Dot resolve to push their teamwork to a higher standard. The pressure is palpable as the trainers grapple with the sheer scale of the Explorers' manipulation, turning the episode into an emotionally charged narrative about testing psychological limits and strengthening internal relationships. Through fierce sparring and raw vulnerability, Liko and her partner Meowscarada reaffirm their unbreakable bond, solidifying the team's collective resolve to clear their names and stop Spinel's final plan.
1361	1350	38	"The Training Royale! (Intense Training! Everyone's Respective Feelings)"; Transliteration: "Ōtokkun! Sorezore no Omoi" (Japanese: 大特訓！それぞれの想い)	Directed by : Ryōtarō Aoba; Storyboarded by : Hiromasa Amano	Michihiro Tsuchiya	Ryōtarō Aoba, Kōsuke Hiramatsu, Ren Tanaka & Sana Sanada	February 13, 2026	July 20, 2026 (UK); September 18, 2026 (US)
The training shifts into maximum gear as Liko and her companions engage in an all-out, exhaustive "Training Royale" inside the Pokémon League's specialized battle room in Paldea. Moving past standard battles, this frantic free-for-all pits the trainers directly against one another, forcing them to rapidly adapt to unpredictable threats and shifting combat conditions. The intense, fast-paced environment serves as the perfect crucible for testing the raw power of their recently evolved teams, allowing the group to iron out flaws in their defensive strategies. By the end of this grueling session, each trainer discovers deep clarity regarding their unique personal goals, forging a unified, powerful strategy to face the upcoming threat.
1362	1351	39	"Dot and Quaxwell Step it Up! (Step By Step! Dot & Welkamo!!)"; Transliteration: "Suteppu Bai Suteppu! Dotto & Werukamo!!" (Japanese: ステップ・バイ・ステップ！ドット&ウェルカモ！！)	Directed by : Hiromichi Matano; Storyboarded by : Shōji Nishida	Naohiro Fukushima	Makoto Shinjō, Rie Eyama & Yuki Masutani	February 20, 2026	July 20, 2026 (UK); September 18, 2026 (US)
The spotlight zeroes in heavily on Dot as she faces an overwhelming crisis of confidence regarding her combat contributions to the team. Recognizing her hidden doubt, Quaxwell pushes Dot into a rigorous, specialized tactical training routine focused heavily on synchronising their physical footwork and rapid-fire command timing. Through a series of increasingly difficult combat exercises against her fellow crewmates, Dot learns to fully embrace her unique instincts as a digital strategist rather than mimicking others. This major mental breakthrough allows Dot and Quaxwell to operate in perfect harmony, culminating in a brilliant display of upgraded agility that firmly establishes her as an equal combat pillar of the group.
1363	1352	40	"Destiny of the Black Rayquaza (The Time Has Come for the Showdown with the Black Rayquaza)"; Transliteration: "Kuroi Rekkuuza, Kecchaku no Toki" (Japanese: 黒いレックウザ、決着の時)	Directed by : Kyōhei Sumiyama; Storyboarded by : Hiromasa Amano	Kimiko Ueno	Takashi Shinohara, Natsumi Hattori, Toshinari Abe, Yusuke Oshida, Tomoki Ogawa & Yūki Hijikata	February 27, 2026	July 20, 2026 (UK); September 18, 2026 (US)
Liko, Roy, and Ult return to the Dragon's Den in Johto, where they reunite with Team Dragon Rampage and learn that Ult is the son of a Dragon Tamer Clan adventurer named Sault. Roy opens the briefcase left by Friede to reveal a raw meteorite from space, which restores the Black Rayquaza's full strength after it consumes it. With help from Terapagos, Rayquaza Terastallizes into a Dragon-type and challenges Roy and Ult to a battle to prove their worthiness as its true partner. After Rayquaza defeats Kilowattrel, Sableye, Mega Lucario, and Mega Dragonite, Roy's Terastallized Skeledirge withstands Rayquaza's Dragon Ascent and defeats it with a close-range Flamethrower. Rayquaza allows Roy to catch it in his Poké Ball, before departing to gather the remaining Six Heroes for the upcoming confrontation at Laqua.
1364	1353	41	"Hamber's Moonlight Battle (Hambel on the Night of the Blood Moon)"; Transliteration: "Akai Tsukiyo no Hanberu" (Japanese: 赤い月夜のハンベル)	Misu Yamaneko	Kureha Matsuzawa	Kōki Yanagihara, Masaya Ōnishi, Kenji Katō, Yusuke Oshida, Toshinari Abe & Tomohiro Koyama	March 6, 2026	July 20, 2026 (UK); September 18, 2026 (US)
A quiet night of strategic preparation is shattered when the veteran Explorers administrator Hamber intercepts the heroes under the cover of darkness. Choosing to resolve their ideological conflict through a formal, highly traditional battle, Hamber unleashes his powerful Dusknoir in a hauntingly elegant moonlight showdown. The conflict serves as a brilliant clash of philosophies, with Hamber testing the younger generation's resolve while showcasing the chilling precision of his seasoned combat style. Though the battle pushes the Rising Volt Tacklers to the absolute brink of exhaustion, the encounter acts as a vital trial, giving them a firsthand look at the peak execution of standard master-class battling.
1365	1354	42	"A Surprise Reunion (The Time Has Come! Gather, Companions!)"; Transliteration: "Kitaru! Atsumaru! Nakamatachi" (Japanese: 来たる！集まる！仲間たち)	Directed by : Chiko Ueta; Storyboarded by : Shin'ichi Watanabe	Kureha Matsuzawa	Chiko Ueta, Toshiko Nakaya & Megumi Matsumoto	March 13, 2026	July 20, 2026 (UK); September 18, 2026 (US)
Emotional stakes take center stage when a tense scouting mission leads to a completely shocking face-to-face encounter with a long-lost ally. Amidst the ruins of an abandoned facility, the group is reunited with Captain Friede, who has been operating covertly from the shadows since his apparent disappearance. The overwhelming joy of the reunion is quickly tempered by gravity as Friede delivers critical, alarming intelligence regarding the true nature of the Laquium Core's stability. With the core group fully restored to its maximum strength, the emotional piece of the puzzle slots perfectly into place, giving the team the morale boost needed to initiate their final offensive.
1366	1355	43	"Lucario's Challenge! (Rematch! A Challenge for Lucario!!)"; Transliteration: "Ribenji Matchi! Rukario no Chōsen!!" (Japanese: リベンジマッチ！ルカリオの挑戦！！)	Yūji Asada	Kureha Matsuzawa	Masaaki Iwane & Izumi Shimura	March 20, 2026	July 20, 2026 (UK); September 18, 2026 (US)
The training reaches its absolute peak of mastery when Roy's newly befriended Lucario steps forward to issue an ultimate challenge to the entire team. To fully prepare the crew for the chaotic battlefield ahead, Lucario pushes the limits of its Mega Evolution energy, forcing Liko, Roy, and Dot to simultaneously defend against its overwhelming offensive pressure. This high-magnitude battle demands flawless execution of cross-team combos, pushing the trainers to read each other's movements without speaking a single word. By successfully standing their ground against the Mega-Evolved threat, the trio proves beyond a shadow of a doubt that they are no longer novice students, but true master-level trainers.
1367	1356	44	"The Final Battle Is Near (To the Final Battle)"; Transliteration: "Saigo no Tatakai e" (Japanese: 最後の戦いへ)	Directed by : Yōsuke Fujino; Storyboarded by : Yūko Kiyoshima	Kureha Matsuzawa	Kōki Yanagihara, Natsumi Hattori, Megumi Matsumoto, Keita Hagiwara & Toshinari Abe	April 10, 2026	July 20, 2026 (UK); September 18, 2026 (US)
A heavy, breathless calm settles over the world as both factions position their ultimate assets for the final convergence. The Rising Volt Tacklers gather aboard the fully repaired Brave Olivine, checking every piece of defensive machinery and sharing a quiet, reflective final meal together. Meanwhile, dark omens gather over the Explorers' stronghold as Spinel activates the final sequence to awaken the devastating, dormant Laquium Core. The episode masterfully builds a thick wall of tension, tracking the final goodbyes and silent promises made by Liko and her friends as they chart a direct course into the heart of the approaching storm.
1368	1357	45	"One Step Closer (The Ultimate Showdown! Mega Evolution!!)"; Transliteration: "Chōjō Kessen! Megashinka!!" (Japanese: 頂上決戦！メガシンカ!！)	Directed by : Yoshihiko Iwata; Storyboarded by : Hiromasa Amano	Kureha Matsuzawa	Takashi Shinohara, Hiromi Niioka & Yuki Masutani	April 17, 2026	July 20, 2026 (UK); September 18, 2026 (US)
The initial battle lines are drawn as the Brave Olivine breaches the perimeter of the final battlefield. Facing a massive swarm of automated defensive drones and corrupted wild Pokémon, the crew must systematically fight their way through waves of opposition to clear a path toward the core. Working in perfect tandem, Friede handles the aerial dogfights while Liko, Roy, and Dot lead the ground assault, moving one step closer to the main chamber with every calculated move. The episode acts as a brilliant exhibition of how every single lesson learned across the entire season—from Lacey's pop quizzes to Drayton's rematches—has built the perfect collaborative unit.
1369	1358	46	"The Core Awakens (Awakening! The Catastrophic Rakurium Core)"; Transliteration: "Kakusei! Horobi no Rakuriumu Koa" (Japanese: 覚醒！滅びのラクリウム・コア)	Directed by : Hiroaki Takagi; Storyboarded by : Satoru Iriyoshi & Yusuke Oshida	Kureha Matsuzawa	Yusuke Oshida, Yuzuko Hanai, Masaya Ōnishi, Yasue Ōno, Toshinari Abe & Izumi Shimura	April 24, 2026	July 20, 2026 (UK); September 18, 2026 (US)
The nightmare scenario officially unfolds as Spinel successfully triggers the catastrophic awakening of the pink Laquium Core. A massive wave of disruptive energy ripples across the landscape, sending wild Pokémon into a state of blind, aggressive panic and short-circuiting standard electronic equipment. As the ground literal shatters around them, the Rising Volt Tacklers must dodge falling debris while simultaneously trying to contain the massive radius of the volatile mist. With the world on the absolute brink of ecological collapse, Liko directly confronts Spinel, setting up the ultimate thematic showdown between pure greed and the harmonious bond of Pokémon partnerships.
1370	1359	47	"Stellar Finale"; Transliteration: "Sutera Fināre" (Japanese: ステラ・フィナーレ)	Directed by : Saori Den & Kyōhei Sumiyama; Storyboarded by : Saori Den	Kureha Matsuzawa	Kōki Yanagihara, Natsumi Hattori, Megumi Matsumoto, Izumi Shimura, Masaya Ōnishi, Kenji Katō, Takashi Shinohara & Keita Hagiwara	May 1, 2026	July 20, 2026 (UK); September 18, 2026 (US)
The entire season culminates in an explosive, breathtaking "Stellar Finale" as the team faces Spinel and the fully active Laquium Core in a final, world-ending battle. Terapagos completely unleashes its magnificent Stellar Form, radiating brilliant cosmic energy to directly neutralize the catastrophic pink mist. Combining the absolute pinnacle of Terastallization, Mega Evolution, and raw emotional power, Liko, Roy, and Dot shatter Spinel's final line of defense, safely sealing away the core and restoring harmony to the region. With their names finally cleared and the world saved, the Rising Volt Tacklers look toward the horizon, fully prepared to embark on their next grand adventure into the unknown.

== Release ==
On March 13, 2025, CoroCoro Comic released a first look at the "Mega Voltage" arc, which teased a timeskip. On March 14, The Pokémon Company announced that the new arc of the Pokémon anime would begin airing on April 11 of that year. Following the end of the "Rayquaza Rising" arc, a new trailer and poster were released a week later on March 21, showcasing the return of Mega Evolutions and a new male character named Ult, voiced by Natsumi Fujiwara. On August 22, 2025, a three-part special arc titled "Episode: Mega Evolution" was announced, along with a trailer and poster. After the conclusion of the "Mega Voltage" arc in September 2025, The Pokémon Company revealed that a new arc, titled "Rising Again", would begin broadcasting on October 31 of that same year, focusing on the group's adventures at Blueberry Academy.

In the United States, The Pokémon Company announced that a third season of Pokémon Horizons, titled Pokémon Horizons: Season 3 – Rising Hope would premiere on the streaming service Netflix on January 6, 2026. In the United Kingdom, the first eleven episodes of Rising Hope were released simultaneously on BBC iPlayer and CBBC on October 27, 2025.

== Music ==
The Japanese opening themes are "Get Back" (ゲット・バック, Getto bakku) performed by Yuzu for 21 episodes and "Iolite" (アイオライト, Aioraito) performed by Eve for 21 episodes. The Japanese ending themes are "Ready Go" performed by Me:I for 20 episodes, "YUU" (尤, YUU) performed by Yuzu for 3 episodes and "Asleep or Awake" (ねてもさめても, Netemo Sametemo) performed by Polkadot Stingray for 22 episodes.

Its English opening theme outside of Asia is "Evolving Again" performed by Haven Paschall, while its intsrumental version serves as the ending theme. In Asia, the Japanese opening theme song "Get Back" by Yuzu is used as the English opening theme, while the Japanese ending theme song "Ready Go" serves as the ending theme.
