= Pokémon the Movie: Black—Victini and Reshiram and White—Victini and Zekrom =

2011 film by Kunihiko Yuyama

Pokémon the Movie Black—Victini and Reshiram and White—Victini and Zekrom
- Theatrical release poster

Japanese name
- Kanji: 劇場版ポケットモンスター ベストウイッシュ ビクティニと白き英雄 レシラム / 劇場版ポケットモンスター ベストウイッシュ ビクティニと黒き英雄 ゼクロム
- Literal meaning: Pocket Monsters Best Wishes! The Movie: Victini and the White Hero: Reshiram / Pocket Monsters Best Wishes! The Movie: Victini and the Black Hero: Zekrom
Transcriptions
- Revised Hepburn: Gekijō-ban Pokettomonsutā Besuto Uisshu Bikutini to Shiroki Eiyū Reshiramu / Gekijō-ban Pokettomonsutā Besuto Uisshu Bikutini to Kuroki Eiyū Zekuromu
- Directed by: Kunihiko Yuyama
- Written by: Hideki Sonoda
- Based on: Pokémon: Black & White by: Satoshi Tajiri; Ken Sugimori; Junichi Masuda
- Produced by: Takemoto Mori; Choji Yoshikawa; Yukio Kawasaki; Junya Okamoto; Koichi Kawase
- Starring: See below
- Cinematography: Shinsuke Ikeda
- Edited by: Toshio Henmi
- Music by: Shinji Miyazaki (Note: In Black—Victini and Reshiram only.); Akifumi Tada (Note: In White—Victini and Zekrom only.); Kazuhiko Sawaguchi
- Production companies: OLM, Inc.; OLM Digital; Production I.G; Xebec
- Distributed by: Toho
- Release date: July 16, 2011 (Japan)
- Running time: 95 minutes (each), 190 minutes (total)
- Country: Japan
- Language: Japanese

Pokémon the Movie: Black—Victini and Reshiram (Note: Japanese: 劇場版ポケットモンスター ベストウイッシュ ビクティニと白き英雄 レシラム, Hepburn: Gekijō-ban Pokettomonsutā Besuto Uisshu Bikutini to Shiroki Eiyū Reshiramu; lit. "Pocket Monsters Best Wishes! The Movie: Victini and the White Hero: Reshiram") and Pokémon the Movie: White—Victini and Zekrom (Note: Japanese: 劇場版ポケットモンスター ベストウイッシュ ビクティニと黒き英雄 ゼクロム, Hepburn: Gekijō-ban Pokettomonsutā Besuto Uisshu Bikutini to Kuroki Eiyū Zekuromu; lit. "Pocket Monsters Best Wishes! The Movie: Victini and the Black Hero: Zekrom") are a pair of 2011 Japanese animated films produced by OLM, Inc., Production I.G, and Xebec and distributed by Toho. The two-part film, which was directed by Kunihiko Yuyama from a screenplay by Hideki Sonoda, is the 14th animated installment in the Pokémon film series and the first film of Pokémon the Series: Black & White.

The two films follow a similar plot. Both films follow a man called Damon, descended from the residents of a dead kingdom called the Kingdom of the Vale. In Black—Victini and Reshiram, he finds Zekrom, a dragon-like creature known as a Pokémon to fulfill his ideals. In White—Victini and Zekrom, he finds the Pokémon Reshiram to find the truth. In both films, the dragon leads Damon to pilot the town's floating castle with the powers of the Pokémon Victini in an attempt to restore his old kingdom and reunite the People of the Vale that have scattered over the past thousand years.

The films were released on July 16, 2011, and grossed over $57 million in Japan. The two sides of Every Little Thing's double A-side single "Sora/Koe" (宙 -そら-/響 -こえ-; lit. "Air/Voice") serve as the ending songs for the two films; "Sora" is the theme for the Zekrom version and "Koe" is the theme for the Reshiram version.

== Plot ==
The two films follow a similar plot with some major and minor changes, notably the Legendary Pokémon that appear and where they appear. In Black—Victini and Reshiram, Damon finds Zekrom under the castle to fulfill his ideals, while Ash finds Reshiram to find the truth. The roles are swapped in White—Victini and Zekrom. Damon has a Gothitelle in Black—Victini and Reshiram and a Reuniclus in White—Victini and Zekrom.

1,000 years ago, Victini, a Mythical Pokémon which can boost the power of other Pokémon, was friends with the king of the Kingdom of the Vale, who ruled over the People of the Vale. The people and Pokémon in the kingdom used an energy source called the Dragon Force to live in harmony with nature. The king's sons were accompanied by the black and white dragon Legendary Pokémon, Reshiram and Zekrom, but the princes became enemies leading to a war between Reshiram and Zekrom, who mortally wounded each other, transforming into stones and falling into a long slumber. The Dragon Force grew destructive, so to contain the energy, the king created a dark magical barrier around the castle using the Pillars of Protection to use Victini's powers to make the Psychic-type Pokémon move the castle known as the Sword of the Vale to the mountaintop where Eindoak Town now stands. The king used up his own magic power and died, and Victini was trapped in the barrier isolated by the Pillars of Protection. Over time, the People of the Vale scattered, leaving Victini inside the barrier. Eventually, the chaos within the Dragon Force subsided, the two princes were filled of deep remorse, and they moved the stoned Reshiram and Zekrom to a cave beneath the castle.

In the present, the vale has become inhospitable. Damon, a descendant of the People of the Vale, hopes to restore the vale using Victini's powers and reunite the scattered People of the Vale, based on his mother Juanita's wish during his childhood. He finds either Zekrom or Reshiram after hearing the dragon Pokémon's voice in the caves beneath the castle. Unaware that doing so would threaten the Dragon Force to destroy the entire world, Zekrom or Reshiram shows Damon how to move the castle and use the Dragon Force's energy.

At Eindoak Town's harvest festival, Pokémon trainers Ash Ketchum, Iris, and Cilan take part in a Pokémon battle competition. Damon's sister Carlita notices Victini has been giving Ash's Tepig and Scraggy power boosts. Ash offers Victini some of Cilan's macarons and he and his friends befriend Victini. The next day, Ash promises to take Victini to the ocean, but Damon then forces Victini to use its power to help move the castle and redirect the Dragon Force's power to the vale. Ash and Juanita try to stop Damon from harming Victini, but their attempts are thwarted by Zekrom and Damon's Gothitelle or by Reshiram and Damon's Reuniclus. Ash ventures into the caves and finds Reshiram or Zekrom to help Victini. As Reshiram and Zekrom duel, both spot the destructive Dragon Force and join forces to stop it.

Zekrom or Reshiram releases Victini and Damon is shown the Dragon Force, prompting him to use the castle to contain the unstable power with help from Reshiram and Zekrom. The group evacuate the castle, but Damon wants to try and fix the mess he has made, and Victini remains trapped by the barrier with Ash and Pikachu not wanting to leave Victini, while the Dragon Force's power grows deadlier and the castle floats up into the sky. Victini appears to sacrifice itself to blast apart the barrier by using its signature move V-Create, the contained Dragon Force energy being fired into space. Damon, Reshiram, and Zekrom guide the castle to the edge of the sea, and seal away the Dragon Force once again.

Later, Ash, Iris, and Cilan visit a nearby beach in Victini's memory, tossing one of Cilan's macarons into the ocean. Victini appears and eats it, now free of the barrier (and somehow having survived the ordeal of using V-Create to destroy the Pillars of Protection and the barrier) and has plans to restore the valley its own way. Damon begs for forgiveness, receiving it from Juanita.

== Cast ==
=== Regular characters ===
Character	Voice actor (Japanese)	Voice actor (English)
Ash	Rica Matsumoto	Sarah Natochenny
Pikachu	Ikue Ōtani	Ikue Ōtani
Iris	Aoi Yūki	Eileen Stevens
Cilan	Mamoru Miyano	Jason Griffith
Jessie	Megumi Hayashibara	Michele Knotz
James	Shin-ichiro Miki	Carter Cathcart
Meowth	Inuko Inuyama	Carter Cathcart
Narrator	Unshō Ishizuka	Rodger Parsons

=== Guest characters ===
- Damon (ドレッド, Doreddo; Dread): A protagonist with an antagonistic side. In White—Victini and Zekrom, he dresses in lighter clothing and uses a Reuniclus in battle. In Black—Victini and Reshiram, he dresses in winter clothing and uses a Gothitelle in battle. In both films he wishes to use the legend of the People of the Vale to bring their kingdom back to power and uses Victini to that end.
- Carlita (カリータ, Karīta; Karita): Damon's younger sister who uses a Hydreigon in Pokémon battles. In White, the Hydreigon is shiny.
- Juanita (ジャンタ, Janta; Jeanta): Damon and Carlita's mother who owns a shop where she is assisted by her Golurk. In Black, the Golurk is shiny.
- Mannes (モーモント, Mōmonto; Mormont): Mayor of the city of Eindoak who is knowledgeable in the Victini myth.
- Luisa (セード, Sēdo; Seyde): A child of the People of the Vale.
- Luis (オード, Ōdo; Aude): A child of the People of the Vale.
- Victini (ビクティニ, Bikutini): A Legendary Pokémon living in Eindoak. It is said it has mysterious powers Victini can share to someone it befriends to.

== Production ==
The production team visited locations of the Alpes-Maritimes department of Southern France, including Nice, Gourdon, Tourrettes-sur-Loup, Èze, Roquebrune-Cap-Martin, Sainte-Agnès, Peillon, and Cagnes-sur-Mer, as well as visits to the French Riviera, Normandy, Paris, and Mont Saint-Michel, as inspiration for the setting of the films.

== Promotion ==
To promote the films in Japan, players of Pokémon Black and White were able to download a Victini for their games. This Victini was different from the one that was given to initially promote the video games' release, as it was given several attacks that it would not be able to learn throughout normal gameplay. This included its signature moves Searing Shot and V-Create (unobtainable in gameplay), as well as Reshiram and Zekrom's unique moves Fusion Flare and Fusion Bolt.

To promote the movie release in the US, it was announced on the official US Pokémon website that starting on December 3, 2011, to December 31, 2011, players of Pokémon Black and White could download Victini to their games through the Nintendo Wi-Fi Connection. This Victini also included its signature moves Searing Shot and V-Create (unobtainable in gameplay), as well as Reshiram and Zekrom's unique moves Fusion Flare and Fusion Bolt and held a Fire Gem. A bonus manga sampler of Pokémon Black and White was also given away at theaters playing Pokémon the Movie: White—Victini and Zekrom. A sweepstakes also took place on the official site as a promotion for the movie. A second promotion was released in the US for the DVD release of the movies. Between March 10, 2012, and April 8, 2012, players were able to download a level 100 Reshiram or a level 100 Zekrom depending on which version the player had through the Nintendo Wi-Fi Connection. When players who "tucked in" Reshiram or Zekrom using the Game Sync in their game both Pokémon unlocked a special C-Gear skin of the Pokémon they received, as well as a special place in the Dream World on the Pokémon Global Link site where a special password could be obtained to get a special Victini doll for the user's house in the Dream World.

== Release ==
=== Theatrical run ===
Pokémon The Movie: White—Victini and Zekrom received a limited theatrical release in the United States by the digital cinema developer and distributor, Cinedigm, on December 3 and 4, 2011. This made it the first Pokémon film to be screened in American theatres since Pokémon Heroes.

In Japan, the films became the 2nd highest-grossing Japanese films of 2011, grossing ¥4.33 billion.

=== Broadcast airing ===
Pokémon the Movie: Black—Victini and Reshiram aired on Disney XD in the United Kingdom and Cartoon Network in the United States on December 10, 2011. Pokémon the Movie: White—Victini and Zekrom aired on Cartoon Network on February 11, 2012.

=== Home media ===
A two-disc DVD set was released in the United States on April 3, 2012. The movies were released in the UK by Universal Pictures Home Entertainment on April 9, 2012. They were both later re-released in the UK on DVD by Manga Entertainment. On April 17, 2019, as part of the Black and White Movie Collection, along with the other two Black and White movies; Pokémon the Movie: Kyurem vs. the Sword of Justice and Pokémon the Movie: Genesect and the Legend Awakened, before both being re-released again as a separate single disc release on September 2, 2019.
