= Pokémon: Giratina & the Sky Warrior =

2008 film by Kunihiko Yuyama

- Theatrical release poster

Japanese name
- Kanji: 劇場版ポケットモンスター ダイヤモンド&パール ギラティナと氷空（そら）の花束 シェイミ
- Literal meaning: Pocket Monsters Diamond & Pearl the Movie: Giratina and the Bouquet of the (Frozen) Sky: Shaymin
Transcriptions
- Revised Hepburn: Gekijō-ban Pokettomonsutā Daiyamondo Pāru Giratina to Sora no Hanataba Sheimi
- Directed by: Kunihiko Yuyama
- Screenplay by: Hideki Sonoda
- Based on: Pokémon: Diamond and Pearl by: Satoshi Tajiri; Junichi Masuda; Ken Sugimori
- Produced by: Mikihiko Fukazawa; Takemoto Mori; Junya Okamoto; Choji Yoshikawa
- Starring: see below
- Cinematography: Takaya Mizutani
- Edited by: Toshio Henmi
- Music by: Shinji Miyazaki
- Production companies: OLM, Inc. OLM Digital
- Distributed by: Toho
- Release date: July 19, 2008 (Japan)
- Running time: 96 minutes
- Country: Japan
- Language: Japanese
- Box office: ¥4.8 billion

Pokémon: Giratina & the Sky Warrior (Note: Japanese: 劇場版ポケットモンスター ダイヤモンド&パール ギラティナと氷空(そら)の花束 シェイミ, Hepburn: Gekijō-ban Pokettomonsutā Daiyamondo Pāru Giratina to Sora no Hanataba Sheimi; lit. "Pocket Monsters Diamond & Pearl the Movie: Giratina and the Bouquet of the (Frozen) Sky: Shaymin") (Note: Sometimes titled Pokémon: Giratina and the Sky Warrior) is a 2008 Japanese animated adventure film produced by OLM, Inc. and distributed by Toho. The film was directed by Kunihiko Yuyama from a screenplay by Hideki Sonoda. It is the eleventh film in the Pokémon anime series and the second film of Pokémon the Series: Diamond and Pearl, created by Satoshi Tajiri, Junichi Masuda and Ken Sugimori, and serves as a direct sequel to Pokémon: The Rise of Darkrai (2007).

In the film, a researcher called Zero seeks to sacrifice and absorb the interdimensional abilities of a Pokémon known as Giratina, which has surfaced in Zero's world following the events of the previous film, so that Zero can become the ruler of Giratina's world. Meanwhile, the Pokémon trainers Ash Ketchum, Dawn, and Brock escort a flower-bearing Pokémon called Shaymin, which is being followed by Giratina, to reunite it with other Shaymin at a flower garden.

It was released in Japan on July 19, 2008, to generally positive reviews from critics. A sequel, Pokémon: Arceus and the Jewel of Life, was released in 2009. The theme song for the film is "One" by Crystal Kay.

== Plot ==
Five years ago, Newton Graceland, a researcher of a world exactly opposite to the world of reality called the Reverse World, built a device to absorb the abilities of the Legendary Pokémon Giratina, the ruler of the Reverse World, to travel freely between the two worlds. He canceled the project upon learning that the process would kill Giratina. The blueprints were deleted, but Newton's assistant Zero never forgot them.

Later, time and space, two dimensions that should never have been in contact, collided and unraveled. Dialga, the Pokémon which rules over time, and Palkia, which controls space, then fought each other in Alamos Town, (Note: As depicted in the 2007 film Pokémon: The Rise of Darkrai.) both believing the other to have violated their territory. The distortions in time and space defiled the Reverse World with pollution, angering Giratina.

Giratina captures Dialga and drags it into the Reverse World. Shaymin, a hedgehog-like Pokémon which bears flowers, gets caught on Dialga's back when the portal opens. A frightened Shaymin uses its powers to escape through a portal back to the world of reality. Dialga follows Shaymin after it disables Giratina's ability to venture to the world of reality by trapping it in an infinite time loop.

Shaymin runs into Pokémon trainers Ash Ketchum, Dawn, and Brock, who agree to take Shaymin to the Flower Garden in the mountains, so it and others of its kind can migrate and grow a new garden, through a process called flower bearing. However, a portal to the Reverse World opens and swallows Shaymin, Ash, and Dawn.

In the Reverse World, Ash and Dawn encounter Giratina but are rescued by Newton. Giratina, who wants to use Shaymin's power to enter into the world of reality, targets Shaymin, prompting Newton to send Shaymin, Ash, and Dawn back to the world of reality. Zero, who is also seeking Shaymin's power, attacks the kids with his army of Magnemite, Magneton, and Magnezone, forcing them to escape onto a departing train. On the train, Shaymin makes contact with a Gracidea flower and transforms into its Sky Forme, altering its appearance to a deer-like state and allowing it to fly. Ash, Dawn, and Brock board a ferry to the Flower Garden, but are sucked into the Reverse World again, followed by Zero and his Pokémon. Giratina attacks the group after Shaymin provokes it. When night falls, Shaymin transforms back to its normal form. Zero captures Shaymin, forcing it to open a portal for Giratina to return to the world of reality, freeing it from the time loop. Shaymin panics, opening a portal which sends Ash and his friends to the Flower Garden in the world of reality.

Giratina returns to the world of reality and is captured by Zero. Zero uses Newton's device to absorb Giratina's abilities with the intention of becoming ruler of the Reverse World. Newton shuts down the device, releasing Giratina. However, Zero has already absorbed all of Giratina's abilities and Giratina collapses from exhaustion. Shaymin heals Giratina, and Zero flees to the Reverse World to cause damage to the world of reality, resulting in the mountain's glacier to start moving towards the Flower Garden. The Pokémon Regigigas is awakened, and along with a herd of Mamoswine, slows the glacier down.

In the Reverse World, Shaymin opens a portal, dragging Zero back to the world of reality. Zero's ship crashes into the glacier, as Dawn's Buneary and Swinub freeze the ship, causing Zero to lose all of the data about Giratina's abilities. Giratina restores the damage caused by Zero, and gives Ash a ride back to the world of reality. It then leaves on its own to track down Dialga. Shaymin and the others of its kind perform flower bearing, before migrating. During the end credits, Newton rescues and reconciles with Zero who is then arrested, whilst Ash, Dawn, and Brock send bouquets of flowers to their respective families as an expression of gratitude.

== Cast ==
=== Main cast ===
Character	Japanese	English
Ash	Rica Matsumoto	Sarah Natochenny
Dawn	Megumi Toyoguchi	Emily Bauer
Brock	Yuji Ueda	Bill Rogers
Newton Graceland	Koichi Yamadera	Marc Thompson
Zero	Shido Nakamura	Parker Anderson
James	Shinichiro Miki	Billy Beach
Jessie	Megumi Hayashibara	Michele Knotz
Layla	Akina Minami	Amy Palant
Magnezone	Golgo Matsumoto	Bill Rogers
Meowth	Inuko Inuyama	Billy Beach
Mousse	Red Yoshida	Tom Wayland
Pikachu	Ikue Otani	Ikue Otani
Shaymin	Vanilla Yamazaki	Amy Palant
Regigigas	Yukito Soma	Yukito Soma
Infi	Shoko Nakagawa	Bella Hudson
Narrator	Unsho Ishizuka	Rodger Parsons

== Release ==
=== Theatrical run ===
The film was released in Japan on July 19, 2008, by Toho.

=== Broadcast airing ===
Pokémon: Giratina & the Sky Warrior was aired in United States on February 13, 2009, on Cartoon Network.

=== Home media ===
This was the first Pokémon film to be distributed by Universal Studios Home Entertainment in North America. It was also the first anime film that Universal has ever distributed in the country. The home media rights holders for the Pokémon anime, Viz Media would later re-release the film on July 7, 2015, with Warner Home Video acting as the distributor. Universal Studios Home Entertainment also released the film in several European countries, including the United Kingdom. Then it was later re-released by Manga Entertainment in the UK on May 21, 2018, as part of the 'Diamond and Pearl 4 film collection. It was later re-released again separately by Manga UK on April 15, 2019.

== Reception ==
=== Box office ===
The film ranked number two at the box office, beaten by Ponyo on the Cliff by the Sea during the July 19–20 weekend, when Giratina to Sora no Hanataba: Shaymin saw 982,000 viewers spending ¥1,018,770,000 ($9,463,400) to see the film. It eventually raked in just 10% less than the previous year's film, Pokémon: The Rise of Darkrai.

=== Critical reception ===
Pokémon: Giratina & the Sky Warrior got generally positive reviews. Kidzworld gave it a positive review saying that "In summary, it's a fine movie, and definitely worth watching, whether you're a fan of Pokemon or not".
