= Pokémon the Movie: The Power of Us =

- Release poster, designed and illustrated by Yoshitoshi Shinomiya

Japanese name
- Kanji: 劇場版(げきじょうばん)ポケットモンスター みんなの物語
- Literal meaning: Pocket Monsters the Movie: Everyone's Story
Transcriptions
- Revised Hepburn: Gekijō-ban Pokettomonsutā Minna no Monogatari
- Directed by: Tetsuo Yajima
- Written by: Eiji Umehara (Note: Composition (構成)); Tetsuo Yajima
- Screenplay by: Eiji Umehara; Aya Takaha
- Based on: Pokémon by Satoshi Tajiri
- Produced by: Satoshi Shimodaira; Susumu Matsuyama; Atsushi Chiku; Shun Ohinata
- Starring: see below
- Cinematography: Ryo Kujirai; Kenji Takahashi
- Edited by: Jin Nogawa
- Music by: Shinji Miyazaki
- Production companies: OLM; OLM Digital; Wit Studio
- Distributed by: Toho
- Release date: July 13, 2018 (Japan)
- Running time: 100 minutes
- Country: Japan
- Language: Japanese
- Box office: $23.7 million

Pokémon the Movie: The Power of Us (Note: Originally released in Japan as Pocket Monsters the Movie: Everyone's Story (劇場版 ポケットモンスター みんなの物語, Gekijō-ban Pokettomonsutā Minna no Monogatari)) is a 2018 Japanese anime adventure film based on Satoshi Tajiri's Pokémon media franchise, produced by OLM and Wit Studio and distributed by Toho. It is the twenty-first film of the Pokémon anime series, the second film of the alternate timeline trilogy and a sequel to Pokémon the Movie: I Choose You!. The film was directed by Tetsuo Yajima, written by Eiji Umehara and Aya Takaha, and stars the voices of Rica Matsumoto, Ikue Ōtani, Megumi Hayashibara, Shin-ichiro Miki, Inuko Inuyama, Rina Kawaei, Mana Ashida, Koji Ohkura, Gaku Hamada, Masako Nozawa, Koichi Yamadera, and Inori Minase. In the film, several humans and their partner Pokémon creatures work together to stop a forest fire and a poisonous spore that threatens Fula City and its nearby wildlife.

It was released in Japan on July 13, 2018. The Pokémon Company International and Fathom Events released the film on a limited theatrical run in select countries on November 24, 2018. It grossed $23.7 million worldwide. It was followed by the sequel Pokémon the Movie: Secrets of the Jungle.

== Plot ==
Fula City was founded on barren land that was developed by humans after the Legendary Pokémon Lugia granted them the power of wind. The wind festival is held every year.

Fifty years ago, the nearby mountain forest was engulfed in flames due to humans clearing the mountain forest and looking for the mysterious Mythical Pokémon Zeraora. Harriet, the woman who built the wind power plant, burned her hand while failing to save her Snubbull from the burning windmill; she was only able to get the key to start the turbine that Snubbull was holding. This resulted in her becoming distant from Pokémon. Lugia was called to clear the fire. Hoping to protect Zeraora from the humans, the Mayor of Fula City created a lie that Zeraora had died and cursed the mountain. This secret was kept by the mayor's successor, Oliver. Fifty years later, Oliver's daughter Margo takes care of Zeraora after it injures itself saving her and two other Pokémon from a rockslide in the foothills.

Former track runner Risa agrees to attend the festival to capture a Eevee for her younger brother Rick. Ash Ketchum and his partner Pokémon Pikachu attend the festival and take part in the Pokémon catching contest. Con artist Callahan attends the festival with his sister Mia and her daughter Kelly, who suffers from low immunity, so Callahan invents tall tales about him being the best trainer when he does not even have a Pokémon. The elderly Harriet gets the essence of the Pokémon move Sweet Scent on her, resulting in Pokémon following her wherever she goes.

Getting help from timid scientist Toren, Callahan decides to give Toren's speech at his lab in return for Toren helping him win the Pokémon catching contest. A wild Sudowoodo Callahan took pity on begins following him. Callahan comes in first boasting about a rare Pokémon in the woods intriguing everyone, but worrying Margo. Ash places second, and helps Risa capture an Eevee.

Upset over the amount of Pokémon that have been following her, Harriet goes to Toren to ask for an antidote, but says it will take time resulting in her staying with him. Callahan is unable to make it to the speech. Toren tries to give the presentation on his own, but accidentally plays footage of him helping Callahan at the contest in time for everyone to see it. Upset over her uncle's lies, Kelly passes out from exhaustion. Team Rocket steal a bottle of the ability Effect Spore from the lab, only to accidentally lose it in the woods.

Margo steals the eternal flame, a light held on the highest tower in the city to contact Lugia, to stop the festival and keep Zeraora safe and hidden. Margo tries to protect Zeraora from two poachers, but they are rescued by Ash and his friends just in time. Suddenly, the Effect Spore bottle cracks engulfing much of the forest and the city and the group decide to work together to stop it.

Callahan discovers that Mia and Kelly are trapped in a gondola while the city is being engulfed and Sudowoodo allows itself to be captured by him so that they can save the city. Toren gets to the lab and works on an antidote for the Effect Spore threatening the city. A fire suddenly breaks out in the forest, killing the electricity, but Toren uses Team Rocket's Lum Berries to create the antidote.

Zeraora awakens from his nightmare and begins rescuing Pokémon. While Ash and Margo decide to go follow it, Risa is tasked with taking the eternal flame back to the tower. Ash and Pikachu end up fighting Zeraora, who still distrusts humans, but Ash and Margo manage to get through to it and they try help put out the flames. Toren arrives at the power plant to give the antidote to Callahan who tosses it into the turbines while Harriet and the Pokémon turn the blades. Risa gets the eternal flame to the top, and Lugia arrives to put out the fire. Mayor Oliver revokes the lie about Zeraora's disappearance and proclaims that the citizens will peacefully live alongside it.

In the post-credits, the Pokémon Channel announcer is revealed to be Rick as Risa demands to know how he knew where she was. Ash and Pikachu head to their next location.

== Cast ==
Character	Japanese	English
Ash Ketchum	Rica Matsumoto	Sarah Natochenny
Pikachu	Ikue Ōtani	Ikue Ōtani
Jessie	Megumi Hayashibara	Michele Knotz
James	Shin-ichiro Miki	James Carter Cathcart
Meowth	Inuko Inuyama	James Carter Cathcart
Narrator	Unshō Ishizuka	Rodger Parsons
Risa	Rina Kawaei	Haven Paschall
Margo	Mana Ashida	Erica Schroeder
Callahan	Kōji Ōkura	Billy Bob Thompson
Toren	Gaku Hamada	Eddy Lee
Harriet	Masako Nozawa	Kathryn Cahill
Zeraora	Koichi Yamadera	Pete Zarustica
Kelly	Inori Minase	Laurie Hymes
Mia	Yū Shimamura	Martha Harms
Rick	Shoko Nakagawa	Lianne Marie Dobbs
Mayor Oliver	Koichi Yamadera	Marc Thompson

== Production ==
The film was initially announced on the December 10, 2017, broadcast of TV Tokyo's variety program Oha Suta, under the title Pokémon the Movie 2018 (劇場版 ポケットモンスター 2018, Gekijō-ban Poketto Monsutā 2018), showing a new character design for the film's main protagonist Ash Ketchum alongside a new unnamed character. The film also revolves around the Legendary Pokémon Lugia. Alongside the reveal of the film, Wit Studio (Attack on Titan, The Ancient Magus' Bride) was confirmed to co-produce and animate the film. A new trailer for the film was released on February 27, 2018, which revealed 5 new characters accompanying Ash in the movie alongside the mysterious new character; the film's initial premise was also revealed. The staff also revealed that Kunihiko Yuyama served as the film's animation supervisor, which marked the first time he did not direct a Pokémon film in his career. Alongside a different director, Eiji Umehara and Aya Takaha also wrote the film's script.

== Music ==
Regular series composer Shinji Miyazaki wrote the film's score. Porno Graffitti performed the film's ending theme, "Breath". For the international release, composer Ed Goldfarb wrote the film's ending theme, "The Power of Us", performed by Haven Paschall, with additional vocals by Charity Goodin and Ben Dixon.

== Release ==
=== Theatrical run ===
The film premiered theatrically in Japan on July 13, 2018, with a limited release in the United Kingdom, Ireland, United States and Canada starting on November 24—December 1, plus additional screening on December 3 in United States by Fathom Events. It was released in Australia and New Zealand starting on November 25. The English dub was first screened in Singapore on November 12.

=== Home media ===
In the United Kingdom, Manga Entertainment released a collector's Blu-ray/DVD edition on February 19, 2019.

In the United States, the Blu-ray/DVD was released by Viz Media on March 19, 2019.

== Reception ==
=== Box office ===
The Power of Us premiered on July 13, 2018, in 364 theaters in Japan and opened at #2 at the Japanese box office, though the film earned 3.1% less than the opening weekend of last year's Pokémon the Movie: I Choose You! According to polls conducted by Pia Cinemas, the film has hit the mark in Japan. The Power of Us led the pack at the box office with a reported 92.8% rating from the audience.

The Power of Us fell from #3 to #4 during the fourth weekend. The film earned ¥180,860,400 ($1.62 million) from Friday to Sunday and earned a cumulative total of ¥1,652,206,500 ($14.88 million). By its 5th weekend, The Power of Us fell to #9, and earned ¥2,357,352,897.60 ($21 million) on 2.04 million admissions. The Power of Us fell off the top 10 during the seventh weekend, but was still screening. As of October 2019, the film has earned a cumulative total of $23.7 million worldwide.

=== Critical reception ===
Callum May of Anime News Network said that the film is one of the most successful attempts at telling multiple stories within the same Pokémon film. May also added, "Although Zeraora's plot feels too familiar, the cast of human characters and their own personal motivations and secrets leave a stronger impression. There is a possibility that the localisation won't be able to properly translate some aspects and may lose the tone of some important scenes, but if they manage to nail it, Pokémon fans are in for a standout film that reinvents the formula yet again."

The English release received mixed reviews from critics, but became the first Pokémon film to receive a fresh score on Rotten Tomatoes. The review aggregator reported that 71% of critics have given the film a positive review based on seven reviews, with an average rating of 5.9/10. Rosie Knight of IGN said, "Sweet and sincere, The Power of Us is a light and fun adventure film filled with likable characters, fantastic creatures, and enough classic Pokémon to make the most diehard of fans happy." Marc Deschamps of Nintendojo rated the film with a B+ grade and said, "Good standalone story; great animation; strong character development". Josh Stevens of Anime UK News called the film "a much-needed change of pace, creating a charming film that's less about flashy monster battles and more on the people who just happen to live in a Pokémon world. No prior knowledge is required to enjoy this film, so I wholeheartedly recommend it to any Pokémon fan – just remember to stay behind after the credits!"

Conversely, Mike McCahill of The Guardian gave the film a negative review and said the film was "dud animation lost in promo fog." Eddie Harrison of List Film said that the film is "strictly for fans only".

== Sequel ==
The third installment of the Pokémon: Sun & Moon/Alternate Timeline film series, Pokémon: Mewtwo Strikes Back – Evolution, a CGI remake of Pokémon: The First Movie, opened in Japanese cinemas on July 12, 2019, directed by Kunihiko Yuyama and Motonori Sakakibara. Additionally, Takeshi Shudo, who died in 2010, is credited for writing the screenplay.

A more traditionally 2D-animated fourth film, titled Pokémon the Movie: Secrets of the Jungle, was released in Japan on December 25, 2020, followed by an international release in 2021.
