= Pokémon: Wild Card =

Upcoming Japanese anime film

- Teaser poster
- Japanese: ポケモン：ワイルドカード
- Revised Hepburn: Pokemon: Wairudokādo
- Directed by: Katsuhiko Kitada
- Based on: Pokémon by Satoshi Tajiri
- Production companies: Story Inc.; CloverWorks (animation)
- Distributed by: Toho
- Release date: 2027
- Country: Japan
- Language: Japanese

Pokémon: Wild Card (Japanese: ポケモン：ワイルドカード, Hepburn: Pokemon: Wairudokādo) is an upcoming Japanese anime film produced by CloverWorks with Story Inc. handling planning and production. It is the twenty-fourth overall animated film in the Pokémon media franchise, the first animated film to be released since Pokémon the Movie: Secrets of the Jungle in 2020, and the first to focus exclusively on the ongoing collectible card game Pokémon Trading Card Game. It is directed by Katsuhiko Kitada and features character designs by Akemi Hayashi.

Pokémon: Wild Card was first announced during the Pokémon World Championships in August 2026. It is scheduled to be released by Toho in Japan in 2027.

== Premise ==
The film centers on a competitive Pokémon Trading Card Game (TCG) player and his partner Mimikyu.

== Production ==
On August 31, 2026, it was announced that a new Pokémon anime film was in production at CloverWorks, marking the first Pokemon anime film not produced by OLM, Inc., the production company behind all the previous films, and the first to be set in a separate continuity from the Pokémon anime series. Scheduled for release in 2027, the film was announced with a 39-second teaser shown during the closing ceremony of the 2026 Pokémon World Championships. It is the first film to specifically focus on the TCG.
