= Pokémon: The Rise of Darkrai =

2007 film by Kunihiko Yuyama, Tom Wayland

Pokémon the Movie: The Rise of Darkrai
- Theatrical release poster

Japanese name
- Kanji: 劇場版ポケットモンスター ダイヤモンド&パール ディアルガVSパルキアVSダークライ
- Literal meaning: Pocket Monsters Diamond & Pearl the Movie: Dialga vs. Palkia vs. Darkrai
Transcriptions
- Revised Hepburn: Gekijō-ban Pokettomonsutā Daiyamondo Pāru Diaruga tai Parukia tai Dākurai
- Directed by: Kunihiko Yuyama
- Screenplay by: Hideki Sonoda
- Based on: Pokémon Diamond and Pearl by Satoshi Tajiri
- Produced by: Choji Yoshikawa; Mikihiko Fukazawa; Junya Okamoto; Takemoto Mori
- Starring: see below
- Cinematography: Takaya Mizutani
- Edited by: Toshio Henmi
- Music by: Shinji Miyazaki
- Production companies: OLM, Inc. OLM Digital
- Distributed by: Toho
- Release date: July 14, 2007 (Japan)
- Running time: 90 minutes
- Country: Japan
- Language: Japanese
- Box office: $47.3 million

Pokémon: The Rise of Darkrai (Note: Japanese: 劇場版ポケットモンスター ダイヤモンド&パール ディアルガVSパルキアVSダークライ, Hepburn: Gekijō-ban Pokettomonsutā Daiyamondo Pāru Diaruga tai Parukia tai Dākurai; lit. "Pocket Monsters Diamond & Pearl the Movie: Dialga vs. Palkia vs. Darkrai") is a 2007 Japanese animated fantasy adventure film produced by OLM, Inc. and distributed by Toho. The film was directed by Kunihiko Yuyama and written by Hideki Sonoda. It is the tenth film in the Pokémon anime series and the first film of Pokémon the Series: Diamond and Pearl, created by Satoshi Tajiri, Junichi Masuda and Ken Sugimori.

In the film, Dialga and Palkia, two Pokémon known to be deities who were never meant to meet, fight in the space between dimensions. The brawling causes disturbances in the space around Alamos Town. The townsfolk blame the events on a nightmare-causing Pokémon called Darkrai, which is trying to protect the town from Dialga and Palkia's clash. The film was released in Japan on July 14, 2007, to a mixed critical reception but a positive audience reception. Three sequels have been released, Pokémon: Giratina & the Sky Warrior in 2008, Pokémon: Arceus and the Jewel of Life in 2009, and Pokémon—Zoroark: Master of Illusions in 2010, comprising the Diamond & Pearl film series.

Sarah Brightman performs the movie's theme song, a cover of "Where the Lost Ones Go" titled "Be With You (Itsumo Soba ni)" (ビー・ウィズ・ユー〜いつもそばに〜, Bī Wizu Yū ~Itsumo Soba ni~). The cover also features Chris Thompson. This is also the first film to entirely be animated with digital ink and paint.

== Plot ==
A hundred years ago, Godey, the architect who designed an enormous set of musical instruments in Alamos Town called the Space-Time Towers, had a nightmare which he wrote down in his diary, which is later discovered by his great-grandson, the scientist Tonio. The nightmare foretold that two entities that should never have met would cross paths in the space-time rift. Their wrath from this meeting will envelop the town, and cause its collapse. In a garden designed by Godey, Darkrai, a nightmare-causing Pokémon hated by everyone else, opened its heart to a girl called Alicia, who invited Darkrai to stay in the garden. Godey realized the nightmare was telling him to make a music disc for "Orácion", (Note: Spanish for "Prayer") a song with the power to soothe the fiercest rage, for future use. Years later, Darkrai saved the life of Alicia's granddaughter Alice after she tripped and fell from a cliff.

In the present, Godey's foretelling comes true when the Legendary Pokémon Palkia, who can control space, and Dialga, who rules over time, cause disturbances in the air around Alamos Town as they brawl in the space between dimensions. At the same time, Ash Ketchum, Brock, and Dawn arrive in the town for Dawn's next Pokémon Contest inside the Space-Time Towers. Palkia and Dialga's clashing causes a disturbance in space, which damages the garden. Baron Alberto believes this is the work of Darkrai. While battling Alberto's Lickilicky, Darkrai makes Ash fall asleep and creates a nightmare where Palkia attacks Ash. Darkrai then appears before disappearing down a hole that Ash and his partner Pikachu are sucked into.

The next day, Palkia, injured and attempting to hide from Dialga, emerges in Alamos Town. It moves the town to another dimension with no way of escaping. Darkrai reappears in the town square, telling someone to go away. Alberto, joined by Ash, Dawn, and other Pokémon trainers, engage in combat with it. Outraged, Darkrai traps many Pokémon in the town square in nightmares. Later that evening, Tonio finds Palkia resting between the Towers. Darkrai tries to attack the resting Palkia, and Ash realizes that Palkia was the one that Darkrai was telling to go away, and that Darkrai's nightmare was a warning for him.

As Palkia is about to hit Darkrai with one of its attacks, Dialga arrives, opens fire on the two and immediately runs into Palkia. As Palkia and Dialga brawl, the entire town slowly starts to collapse. After Alice finds the "Oración" music disc, Ash and Dawn climb up to the music disc player on the Space-Time Towers' skybridge while Brock helps evacuate the townspeople. Tonio reveals that if Palkia and Dialga collide once more, the dimension they are in will be destroyed. When Palkia and Dialga discharge their attacks, Darkrai crosses the attacks' line and forms a sphere around itself to block the attacks, engulfing and immobilizing Palkia and Dialga in the process.

After breaking free, Palkia and Dialga both attack Darkrai, causing it to disintegrate. Ash and Dawn realize that the Space-Time Towers are no-longer charged, so Pikachu along with Dawn's Pachirisu use their electrical powers to charge the Towers as they play the "Orácion" disc. The song successfully calms Palkia and Dialga down. Dialga flies away, and Palkia's wound heals. Ash and Dawn successfully plead to Palkia to restore the lost parts of the town, returning Alamos Town to how it originally was, and the townspeople and Pokémon rejoice and return home. Later, the group mourns the loss of Darkrai, with Alice thanking it for its efforts. They then find Darkrai standing on top of the Space Tower.

In the end credit montage, Dawn fails to win a ribbon at her Pokémon contest.

== Setting ==
The Rise of Darkrai is set in an area based on Barcelona, Spain. The staff visited this area in September 2006 to form a basis for the movie's setting. Yuyama travelled there with screenwriter Hideki Sonoda and composer Shinji Miyazaki. Places in The Rise of Darkrai are inspired by places in Spain - the Space-Time Towers and Oración featured are based on the incomplete Sagrada Família and the Park Güell, respectively, in Barcelona. The name of the architect behind the Space-Time Towers, Godey, and the name of his descendant, Tonio, bear homage to the name of Sagrada Família's architect, Antoni Gaudí.

== Cast ==
Character	Japanese	English	Notes
Ash	Rica Matsumoto	Sarah Natochenny	A Pokémon trainer who wishes to be a Pokémon Master.
Dawn	Megumi Toyoguchi	Emily Bauer	A Pokémon trainer who wishes to be a Pokémon Coordinator.
Brock	Yūji Ueda	Bill Rogers	A Pokémon trainer who wishes to be a Pokémon Breeder.
Pikachu	Ikue Ōtani	Ikue Ōtani	An Electric Type Pokémon and Ash's partner.
Darkrai	Kōji Ishizaka	Bill Rogers	A Mythical Dark-Type Pokémon that causes nightmares.
Tonio	Koji Yamamoto; Daisuke Sakaguchi (child)	Rich McNanna	A scientist and Alice's longtime friend.
Alice	Rosa Kato	Khristine Hvam	A tour guide and a music student capable of playing the leaf whistle.
Baron Alberto	Kōichi Yamadera	Ax Norman	A rich, snobby Lickilicky trainer
Kai	Ryūji Akiyama	Sean Reyes	An Empoleon trainer who also competes in the Pokémon contest.
Maury	Hiroshi Yamamoto	Joshua Swanson	A Torterra trainer who also competes in the Pokémon contest.
Allegra	Shoko Nakagawa	Elisabeth Morinelli	An Infernape trainer who also competes in the Pokémon contest and wins.
Alicia	Chiharu Suzaka	Kayzie Rogers	Alice's grandmother
Narrator	Unshou Ishizuka	Rodger Parsons	

== Development ==
As with all Pokémon films, it was announced in Japan after the ending credits of the previous Pokémon film; in this case, Pokémon Ranger and the Temple of the Sea.

== Release ==
=== Theatrical run ===
The film originally distributed by Toho was released on Japanese theaters on July 14, 2007, in Japan.

=== Broadcast airing ===
On January 25, 2008, Cartoon Network revealed the title to be Pokémon: The Rise Of Darkrai, with a preview that aired on February 1, 2008, as part of a two-hour premiere involving a tag team battle at 8 PM ET/ PT, and was shown on Cartoon Network on February 24, 2008, in the United States at 7 pm ET/PT. This is the first English dub done by DuArt Film and Video instead of TAJ Studios.

=== Home media ===
In the UK, the movie was released on DVD by Network DVD, who specialise in distributing old British TV shows. Universal Pictures Home Entertainment released the film on DVD in Northern European countries. It was later re-released on DVD in the UK with the other Diamond and Pearl movies as part of the 4 disc Diamond & Pearl Collection from Manga Entertainment, released on May 21, 2018. It was then later re-released as a separate title again by Manga Entertainment on April 15, 2019. Blu-ray Release on December 13, 2021, in the UK.

== Reception ==
=== Box office ===
The Rise of Darkrai topped the Japanese box office charts in the first three days of its release. With a revenue of ¥1.13 billion ($9.26 million) from 1,074,000 viewers, the movie performed better than its predecessor Pokémon Ranger and the Temple of the Sea. The Rise of Darkrai eventually earned a franchise record of ¥5.02 billion (US$47 million). It was the fourth highest-grossing film in Japan of 2007, behind Pirates of the Caribbean: At World's End, Harry Potter and the Order of the Phoenix, and Hero. and it also became the highest grossing anime film of 2007.

Overseas, the film grossed $258,295, including $159,141 in Hong Kong and $99,154 in Taiwan. Worldwide, the film grossed $47,258,295.

=== Critical reception ===
Carl Kimlinger, in his review of the film for Anime News Network, gave the film an overall grade of B−. He described the film's plot as "simple enough for kids to follow with ease", and added: "parents will find the message of teamwork and understanding, as well as the franchise's usual refusal to paint anyone as a villain, quite reassuring." Kimlinger also praised the film's imagery and use of CGI, writing: "Hardly a minute passes without a Pokémon spitting a shiny ball of CGI energy at something", and described a fight sequence between two Pokémon as "a fantastic tableau of spiraling darkness and swirling smears of soap-on-water rainbow light". However, he criticized the overall animation, saying: "[Oriental Light and Magic] never bothered to question how the meticulously rendered CG architecture and frequent bursts of 3-D action would mesh with the simplistic character designs and gaudy cartoon aesthetic of the Pokémon themselves."

Jenny Sanders, writing for Den of Geek, gave the film a score of 4 stars out of 5. She wrote that the film "is very well structured, less-than-obviously scripted and has an impressively epic orchestral soundtrack", and praised the film's special effects and scenery, but stated that they "jar terribly with the rather more basic drawing employed for the characters and Pokémon themselves, which seem to have been lifted from the original creations." She concluded: "Despite its aesthetic faults and somewhat clichéd elements, The Rise of Darkrai is absorbing and entertaining – even if nobody over the age of eight will have any idea what's going on by two-thirds of the way through."

Film Music Central gave it a positive review saying that "While Pokémon: The Rise of Darkrai did weird me out at times, I did enjoy the overall story. More than that, I'm eager to see where the story goes, since I know now that the next two films continue the story that was begun here".

== Sequels ==
Three sequels have been released, Pokémon: Giratina & the Sky Warrior in 2008, Pokémon: Arceus and the Jewel of Life in 2009, and Pokémon—Zoroark: Master of Illusions in 2010, comprising the Diamond & Pearl film series.
