= Michele Knotz =

American voice actress

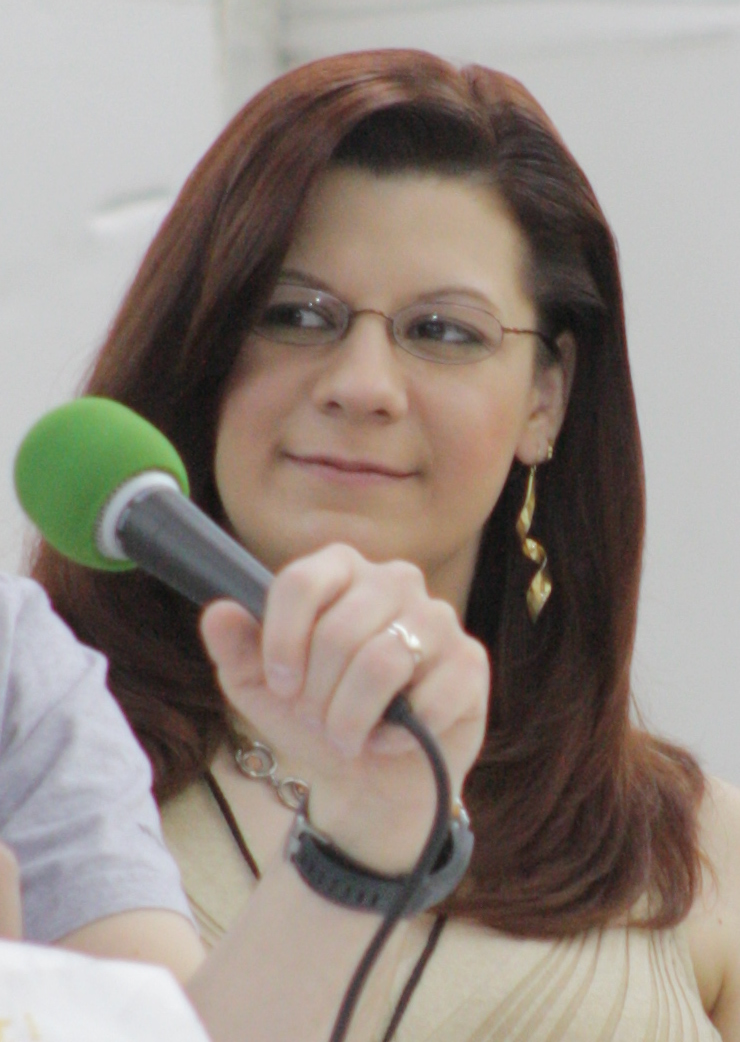
- Knotz in 2009
- Born: New Jersey, U.S.
- Education: Marywood University
- Occupation: Voice actress
- Years active: 2003–present

Twitch information
- Channel: MicheleKnotz
- Years active: 2024–present
- Genre: Gaming
- Followers: 8.7K

YouTube information
- Channel: @MicheleKnotz
- Years active: 2011–present
- Genres: Voice acting; Entertainment; Vlog; Gaming
- Subscribers: 2.48K thousand
- Views: 151 thousand
- Website: Official website

Michele Knotz is an American voice actress who works for New York City-based studios, including TAJ Productions, Headline Sound, and Central Park Media.

== Career ==
Born in New Jersey, Knotz attended Marywood University in Scranton, Pennsylvania.

In 2003, she won the Anime Idol voice acting contest held at the now-defunct Big Apple Anime Fest convention in New York City. She debuted in the role of Hajime Yagi in The World of Narue. In 2006, she was cast as the voices of Misty, May, Nurse Joy and Team Rocket's Jessie in the Pokémon anime series.

== Filmography ==
=== Film ===
List of voice performances in films
Year	Title	Role	Notes	Refs
2007	Pokémon Ranger and the Temple of the Sea	May, Jessie, Manaphy		
2008	Pokémon: The Rise of Darkrai	Jessie, Nurse Joy, Girl, Various Pokémon Creatures		
2009	Pokémon: Arceus and the Jewel of Life	Jessie, Various Pokémon Creatures		
2009	Pokémon: Giratina and the Sky Warrior	Jessie, Nurse Joy, Various Pokémon Creatures		
2011	Pokémon: Zoroark - Master of Illusions	Jessie, Various Pokémon Creatures		
2011	Pokémon the Movie: Black—Victini and Reshiram and White—Victini and Zekrom	Jessie, Various Pokémon Creatures		
2012	Pokémon the Movie: Kyurem vs. the Sword of Justice	Jessie, Various Pokémon Creatures		
2013	Pokémon the Movie: Genesect and the Legend Awakened	Jessie, Various Pokémon Creatures		
2014	Pokémon the Movie: Diancie and the Cocoon of Destruction	Jessie, Various Pokémon Creatures		
2015	Pokémon the Movie: Hoopa and the Clash of Ages	Jessie, Various Pokémon Creatures		
2016	Pokémon the Movie: Volcanion and the Mechanical Marvel	Jessie, Various Pokémon Creatures		
2017	One Piece Film: Gold	Carina		
2017	Pokémon the Movie: I Choose You!	Jessie, Nurse Joy, Piplup, Various Pokémon Creatures		
2019	Pokémon: Mewtwo Strikes Back—Evolution	Misty, Jessie, Various Pokémon Creatures		
2021	Pokémon the Movie: Secrets of the Jungle	Jessie		

=== Anime ===
List of voice performances in anime
Year	Title	Role	Notes	Refs
2004	The World of Narue	Hajime Nagi		
2006–2023	Pokémon	May, Misty, Jessie, Nurse Joy, others		
2007	Tarchin and Friends	Tarchin, Crayons and others		
2007	The Third: The Girl with the Blue Eye	Cindy, Fairy, others		
2009–2014	Ikki Tousen series	Shiryū Chō'un	starting from Dragon Destiny	
2009–2010	Genshiken	Chika Ogiue		
2010–2014	Queen's Blade series	Tomoe, Airi		
2015	Holy Knight	Akira Sakamoto, Lilith's mother		
2015	Ladies versus Butlers!	Sanae Shikikagami		
2016	Fight Ippatsu! Jūden-chan	Sunday Mama Boss		
2017	Rio: Rainbow Gate!	Queen		
2018–2019	Aria series	Athena Glory		
2021	Sleepy Princess in the Demon Castle	Neo Alraune		
2021	Suppose a Kid from the Last Dungeon Boonies Moved to a Starter Town	Rol Calcife		
2021	Full Dive	Hiro (young)		
2025	Tojima Wants to Be a Kamen Rider	Tojima (young)		

=== Animation ===
List of voice performances in animation
Year	Title	Role	Notes	Refs
2025	Pretty Pretty Please I Don't Want to be a Magical Girl	Miss		

=== Video games ===
List of voice performances in video games
Year	Title	Role	Notes	Refs
2008	Super Smash Bros. Brawl	Pokémon Trainer, Squirtle, others	Grouped under Character Voice	
2009	PokéPark Wii: Pikachu's Adventure	Various characters		
2012	PokéPark 2: Wonders Beyond	Various characters		
2012	Street Fighter X Tekken	Alisa Bosconovitch, Roll		Facebook
2013	The Guided Fate Paradox	Lilliel Saotome		
2014	Super Smash Bros. for Nintendo 3DS and Wii U	Various Pokémon characters	Grouped under Character Voice	
2014	Smite	The Sparrow Nike		
2019	YIIK: A Postmodern RPG	Avril Eggleston, Candy Mancer		
2020	KartRider Rush+	Bazzi		
2020	Pokémon Masters	Jessie	Jessie originally lacked voice lines as the COVID-19 pandemic made recording difficult. Knotz later recorded voice lines.	
2021	Regalia: Of Men and Monarchs	Signy		
2024	Kitsune Tails	Yumi (Mom), Ice Guardian		Credits
