= Shinji Miyazaki =

Japanese composer and arranger (born 1956)

- Born: October 7, 1956 (age 70); Kobe, Hyōgo, Japan
- Education: Shobi College of Music
- Occupations: Anime composer, arranger
- Years active: 1989–present
- Organization: Imagine
- Musical career
- Genres: Anime music; film score
- Instrument: Piano

Shinji Miyazaki (宮崎 慎二, Miyazaki Shinji; born October 7, 1956) is a Japanese composer and arranger. He was born in Kobe, and lived in a variety of areas on the island of Shikoku for much of his childhood. He developed a taste for pop music, which eventually led him to study musical arrangement and piano instruction at the Shobi College of Music. He took some time in deciding that music would become his career, but eventually decided to become an arranger, and later a composer.

His work has dealt primarily with musical scores for anime. His most well known contributions include music for the Crayon Shin-chan series, as well as music for much of the Pokémon anime series and most of the films in it from 1997 to 2019. His work pulls from many inspirations, among them J-Pop and American pop influences, as well as jazz artist Gil Evans. Many of his compositions utilize string and brass instruments, particularly the french horn.

== Life ==
Miyazaki was born in Kobe, but moved to the Kamiukena District as a small child. Around the age of 12, he moved to Matsuyama, Ehime. His interest in music began as a child. Both of his parents worked, and often left him with a neighbor during the day. The neighbor's older child listened to pop music on his shortwave radio; Miyazaki would listen as with him, particularly to programs like Billboard.

== Education ==
Miyazaki received no formal music training until the age of 20, when he entered the Shobi College of Music to study musical composition with a minor in piano education. In order to pass the university entrance exam, he spent a year teaching himself the material. He spent two years studying for the entrance exams required to attend a true university, but never entered one.

== Career ==
Miyazaki first entertained the thought of making a profession in the music industry after realizing how much the songs he heard on the radio inspired him. When he first became involved with composing works for anime, he worked primarily as an arranger.

Miyazaki admits to not playing the piano well, even though composing on it is his job.

== Style and methods ==
When asked to compose a new piece of music, Miyazaki uses a number of methods, and often works from flashes of inspiration. When deadlines approach and he still has not composed a song, he tries to distract himself by looking at something he finds beautiful or unusual.

He draws much of his inspiration from the songs he heard on the radio growing up, and particularly the compositions of Tōru Takemitsu. He listens to the enka and kayōkyoku genres, as well as classical music, jazz, and more general American-style pop music. When he relaxes, he listens to African-American music from the 1960s and 1970s. Other inspirations include Gil Evans and John Williams.

== Awards ==
The Japanese Society for Rights of Authors, Composers and Publishers have given Miyazaki the International Award for his song "Pocketmonster BGM", which was cited as having received a large amount of foreign royalty distribution.

== Works ==
=== Music composition ===
- Crayon Shin-chan television series
- Crayon Shin-chan: Arashi wo Yobu Jungle
- Crayon Shin-chan: Arashi wo Yobu! Yuuhi no Kasukabe Boys
- Crayon Shin-chan: Dengeki! Buta no Hizume Daisakusen
- Pokémon anime (1997-2019)
- Pikachu's Island Adventure
- Pokémon: The First Movie
- Pokémon: The Movie 2000
- Pokémon 3: The Movie
- Pokémon: Mewtwo Returns
- Pokémon 4Ever
- Pokémon Heroes
- Pokémon: Jirachi Wish Maker
- Pokémon: Destiny Deoxys
- Pokémon: The Mastermind of Mirage Pokémon
- Pokémon: Lucario and the Mystery of Mew
- Pokémon Ranger and the Temple of the Sea
- Pokémon: The Rise of Darkrai
- Pokémon: Giratina and the Sky Warrior
- Pokémon: Arceus and the Jewel of Life
- Pokémon: Zoroark: Master of Illusions
- Pokémon the Movie: Black—Victini and Reshiram
- Pokémon the Movie: Kyurem vs. the Sword of Justice
- Pokémon the Movie: Genesect and the Legend Awakened
- Pokémon the Movie: Diancie and the Cocoon of Destruction
- Pokémon the Movie: Hoopa and the Clash of Ages
- Pokémon the Movie: Volcanion and the Mechanical Marvel
- Pokémon the Movie: I Choose You!
- Pokémon the Movie: The Power of Us
- Mewtwo Strikes Back: Evolution
- Pokémon the Movie: Secrets of the Jungle
- Oda Cinnamon Nobunaga

=== Theme song arrangement ===
- Magical Girl Pretty Sammy
- Ojarumaru anime
- Sakura Wars 2
