= Pokémon the Movie: Genesect and the Legend Awakened =

2013 Pokémon film directed by Kunihiko Yuyama

- Theatrical release poster

Japanese name
- Kanji: 劇場版ポケットモンスター ベストウイッシュ 神速のゲノセクト ミュウツー覚醒
- Literal meaning: Pocket Monsters Best Wishes! The Movie: ExtremeSpeed Genesect: Mewtwo Awakens
Transcriptions
- Revised Hepburn: Gekijō-ban Pokettomonsutā Besuto Uisshu Shinsoku no Genosekuto Myūtsū Kakusei
- Directed by: Kunihiko Yuyama
- Screenplay by: Hideki Sonoda
- Based on: Pokémon: Black & White by: Satoshi Tajiri; Junichi Masuda; Ken Sugimori
- Produced by: Takemoto Mori; Junya Okamoto; Akiko Odawara; Toshio Miyahara
- Starring: see below
- Cinematography: Tatsumi Yukiwaki
- Edited by: Toshio Henmi
- Music by: Shinji Miyazaki
- Production companies: OLM, Inc. OLM Digital
- Distributed by: Toho
- Release date: July 13, 2013 (Japan)
- Running time: 72 minutes
- Country: Japan
- Language: Japanese
- Box office: $32.3 million

Pokémon the Movie: Genesect and the Legend Awakened (Note: Japanese: 場版ポケットモンスター ベストウイッシュ 神速のゲノセクト ミュウツー覚醒, Hepburn: Gekijō-ban Pokettomonsutā Besuto Uisshu Shinsoku no Genosekuto Myūtsū Kakusei; lit. "Pocket Monsters Best Wishes! The Movie: ExtremeSpeed Genesect: Mewtwo Awakens") is a 2013 Japanese animated film produced by OLM, Inc. and distributed by Toho. The film was directed by Kunihiko Yuyama and written by Hideki Sonoda. It is the sixteenth film of the Pokémon anime series and the third and final film of Pokémon the Series: Black & White.

The film follows a conflict involving a group of Genesect and a single Mewtwo, both human-engineered species of a fictional class of animals called Pokémon, and the wild Pokémon inhabitants of a nature park the Genesect forcibly try to take over to make their new home.

The film premiered in Japan on July 13, 2013.

== Plot ==
Pokémon trainers Ash Ketchum, Iris, and Cilan visit Pokémon Hills, a nature park surrounded by a city. While there, Ash quickly befriends a lost Genesect, a Pokémon that people brought back to life from fossils after being extinct for 300 million years. Ash offers to help the Genesect get back to its home. A red Genesect suddenly attacks Ash and forces the friendly Genesect to attack him as well. Mewtwo, another Pokémon created by people, blocks the attack, saving Ash, Cilan, and Iris' lives. The Genesect, not realizing the humans survived, leave.

That night, five Genesect take over the center of Pokémon Hills, driving out the other Pokémon and building a giant nest near some Panna Lotuses (a flower that existed in their home 300 million years ago) to turn it into their new home. This threatens the substation under Pokémon Hills, along with the city's power supply. Mewtwo, having been told about the Genesect's rampage, appears. It tells the red Genesect not to hurt the other Pokémon, but it refuses to listen, and the two embark on a high-speed chase around the city.

Meanwhile, the Pokémon native to Pokémon Hills fight the three Genesect and begin to overwhelm them, and the red Genesect then returns to protect them. The friendly Genesect saves Ash by taking an attack from the other Genesect, causing it to collapse. Mewtwo fights the four remaining Genesect and gains the upper hand. However, in the process the nest is set on fire.

Ash's Oshawott, together with the Pokémon of Pokémon Hills, help to put out the flames, and save three of the Genesect, who realize that the other Pokémon are not their enemies and save Ash from a falling beam. Ash, along with the four Genesect other than the red Genesect, run between Mewtwo and the red Genesect to stop them from fighting. The red Genesect claims that they are all its enemies and fires an attack, but Mewtwo blocks it takes it into space. In awe of the beauty it originated from, the red Genesect realizes that all people and Pokémon are friends. Unable to survive there, Mewtwo and the red Genesect begin to fall. Oshawott and the wild Pokémon create a giant ball of water to cushion Mewtwo and the red Genesect's fall. By morning, Eric restores the power.

Ash realizes that the perfect place for the Genesect to live is Absentia National Park, the only place where Panna Lotuses still grow naturally. Ash, Iris, Cilan, and Eric take the Genesect there, where they start building another nest.

== Cast ==
=== Regular characters ===
Character	Japanese	English
Ash	Rica Matsumoto	Sarah Natochenny
Pikachu	Ikue Ōtani	Ikue Ōtani
Iris	Aoi Yūki	Eileen Stevens
Cilan	Mamoru Miyano	Jason Griffith
Jessie	Megumi Hayashibara	Michele Knotz
James	Shin-ichiro Miki	Carter Cathcart
Meowth	Inuko Inuyama	Carter Cathcart
Narrator	Unshō Ishizuka	Ken Gates

=== Guest characters ===
- Genesect (ゲノセクト, Genosekuto): An ancient Pokémon revived by Team Plasma. They are initially responsible for some events in the anime TV series. Team Plasma "enhanced" it by having a cannon installed onto its back that can be equipped with several elemental cassettes known as "Drives" (Burn Drive, Shock Drive, Chill Drive, Douse Drive), which changes the type of its signature move Techno Blast. It can also fly at high speeds by transforming into a High-Speed Flight Form. In the original Japanese release, the Genesect are voiced by Koichi Yamadera, Sumire Morohoshi, Akeno Watanabe, Kiyotaka Furushima, and Kensuke Satō.
- Mewtwo (ミュウツー, Myūtsū): A successful clone of Mew made by Mew's fossil, it is said to be the most powerful Pokémon in existence. This Mewtwo is an entirely different individual from the one that appeared previously in Pokémon films, possessing a female voice and distinct personality traits in comparison to the original Mewtwo. This Mewtwo can assume a new form referred to as "Awakened Mewtwo" (覚醒したミュウツー, Kakusei-shita Myūtsū), later known as Mega Mewtwo Y, following the release of Pokémon X and Y. In the original Japanese release, is provided by Reiko Takashima. In the English dub, Miriam Pultro provides the voice.
- Eric (エリック, Erikku): Is a park ranger who works at Pokémon Hills in New Tork City and a Guest character from the movie. Eric's voice in the original Japanese release is provided by Takashi Yoshimura.

== Production ==
=== Development ===
Moviegoers could receive Genesect in copies of the Pokémon Black, White, Pokémon Black 2, or White 2 video games at theaters from January 11 to February 20, 2013.

The film's setting is based on New York City, much like the Black, White, Black 2, and White 2 games, with Central Park as a key location. Director Kunihiko Yuyama stated that this was chosen to contrast a modern city with the wild and ancient nature of Genesect. A special episode of the anime serving as a prologue to the film aired on TV Tokyo, titled Mewtwo: Prologue to Awaking (ミュウツー ～覚醒への序章（プロローグ）～, Myūtsū ~Kakusei e no Purorōgu~).

=== Music ===
The film's ending song is titled "Egao" (笑顔; lit. 'Smile'), performed by the J-pop group Ikimono-gakari.

== Release ==
The film was released in Japan on July 13, 2013, by Toho. It was released in the U.S. and the U.K. on October 19, 2013, where it aired on Cartoon Network and CITV respectively.

== Reception ==
=== Box office ===
In its opening weekend, the film debuted #2 on the Japanese box office with $4,901,163. As of September 8, 2013, the film grossed $30,906,537 in Japan and $1,386,840 in South Korea, as of January 12, 2014, for a worldwide total of $32,293,377. It was the 10th highest-grossing film of the year in Japan.

=== Critical reception ===
Rebecca Silverman of Anime News Network gave the dub an overall grade of B, describing the film as "a very dark film in such a kid-friendly franchise", and praised the film's animation, but stated: " Ash and his pals serve very little point ... at least they're still less extraneous than Team Rocket, who really could have been left out of the film." She concluded that the film "is cinematic in the scope of its art, pays attention to some of the darker aspects of the franchise's world, and as usual showcases a variety of interesting creatures against lovely backgrounds."

Eric Switzer of The Gamer gave the film a negative review, calling it a "real mess of a movie". He said that the story could have been great but the slapdash way it was replaced ruined any hope the movie had of saying something worthwhile. He also said that it might be the most disappointing Pokémon film ever made.
