= Pokémon: Jirachi, Wish Maker =

2003 film by Kunihiko Yuyama

- Theatrical release poster

Japanese name
- Kanji: 劇場版衣嚢怪獣「ポケモン」先進世代 [アドバンスジェネレーション] 七夜の願い星 ジラーチ
- Literal meaning: Pocket Monsters Advanced Generation the Movie: The Wishing Star of Seven Nights Jirachi
Transcriptions
- Revised Hepburn: Gekijō-ban Pokettomonsutā Adobansu Jenerēshon Nanayo no Negaiboshi Jirāchi
- Directed by: Kunihiko Yuyama
- Screenplay by: Hideki Sonoda
- Based on: Pokémon by: Satoshi Tajiri; Junichi Masuda; Ken Sugimori
- Produced by: Yukako Matsusako; Takemoto Mori; Choji Yoshikawa
- Starring: see below
- Cinematography: Takaya Mizutani; Hisao Shirai
- Edited by: Toshio Henmi
- Music by: Shinji Miyazaki
- Production company: OLM, Inc.
- Distributed by: Toho
- Release date: July 19, 2003 (Japan)
- Running time: 81 minutes
- Country: Japan
- Language: Japanese
- Box office: ¥4.5 billion

Pokémon: Jirachi, Wish Maker (Note: Originally released in Japan as Pocket Monsters Advanced Generation the Movie: The Wishing Star of Seven Nights — Jirachi (Japanese: 劇場版ポケットモンスターアドバンスジェネレーション 七夜の願い星 ジラーチ, Hepburn: Gekijō-ban Pokettomonsutā Adobansu Jenerēshon Nanayo no Negaiboshi Jirāchi)) is a 2003 Japanese animated adventure fantasy film directed by Kunihiko Yuyama. It is the sixth film of the Pokémon anime series and the first film of Pokémon the Series: Ruby and Sapphire. It was accompanied by the short Gotta Dance. (Note: Originally released in Japan as Odoru Pokemon Himitsu Kichi (おどるポケモンひみつ基地; Secret Base of the Dancing Pokémon))

The film was released in theaters in Japan on July 19, 2003, by Toho. The English-language adaptation was distributed by Miramax Films and released direct-to-video on June 1, 2004. The events of the film take place during Pokémon: Advanced.

The featured song in this movie is Asuca Hayashi's A Small Thing (小さきもの, Chiisaki Mono) in the Japanese version while the English version, Make a Wish, was sung by Cindy Mizelle. The tune of this song is also used as the lullaby May and Max's mother used to sing to them when they were children. This is the first movie in which the original Japanese song is also clearly used in the English version, and the first time in which the names of the guest characters were the same in both the English and Japanese versions.

== Plot ==
The Millennium Comet, which appears in the night sky for seven days once every thousand years, is approaching. This is also when the Mythical Pokémon Jirachi awakens from its long slumber to absorb the comet's energy; the energy, in turn, brings life to the area known as Forina where it rests. However, a magician known as Butler and his girlfriend Diane unearth the stone that encases Jirachi, and take it away from Forina.

Meanwhile, in celebration of the Millennium Comet's appearance, Ash Ketchum and his friends May, Max, and Brock arrive at a wide crater, which is where the festival of the Millennium Comet is meant to be. While they're sleeping, the festival arrives and they later watch as everything is set up.

At the festival, May buys a seven-panelled novelty that is said to grant a person one wish if a panel is closed for each night the comet appears and is visible in the sky. Later, Ash and Max accidentally volunteer for one of Butler's magic tricks after Max hears a voice coming from the rock Diane is holding. Max is introduced to Jirachi, who he hears talking from inside the rock. Butler lets Max take the rock, from which Jirachi emerges later that night. Hoping its wishing ability is true, Max wishes for lots of candy, and it appears – but it is revealed that instead of creating the candy, Jirachi teleported it from a stall in the festival.

The intentions of Butler are soon revealed: he was a former scientist for Team Magma who was seeking to resurrect the Legendary Pokémon Groudon. Butler had devised the perfect system, but could not find the necessary amount of power to fuel and was fired from Team Magma, to his humiliation. To try and fuel his machine again, he hopes to use Jirachi's energy for his own purposes. Seeing this danger, the Pokémon Absol, whose presence usually indicates impending disaster, arrives to help Jirachi and alert the group.

Butler attempts to harness Jirachi's power, but is interrupted inside the circus tent by Ash and his friends. With the help of Diane and Absol, they take Butler's bus to Forina so that Jirachi can go home; unknown to them, Butler's Mightyena places a tracking device on the bus as it is leaving. As Ash and his friends travel along bumpy terrain, the device falls off, but Butler still discovers where they are headed. On the day before Jirachi has to return, Max feels upset about losing his new friend, so Ash tells him about one of his friends, Misty, explaining that even though they no longer see each other, they will always be friends. Before the group can make it back to Forina, they realize that Butler had followed them there and set a trap. Butler manages to once again steal Jirachi in an attempt to take its power again.

When Butler sets his plan in motion, he is shocked to find out that his work didn't create a resurrected Groudon, but instead just created a giant monster resembling Groudon. The fake Groudon soon begins to consume all of life by absorbing the energy from the surrounding area, turning Forina into a wasteland by killing all plants in sight and absorbing all living creatures, including May, Brock, and Team Rocket, who had followed them the whole way. When Diane is absorbed by the fake Groudon, Butler realizes his long-time relationship with her is what is more important, and with Ash and Max's help, he is able to distract the fake Groudon.

Eventually, Jirachi re-absorbs the energy used to create the fake Groudon, and uses Doom Desire to destroy it for good, before leaving for another thousand years of slumber. May, in all the excitement, forgets to close the last panel of her novelty, but simply brushes it off. Though she never reveals what she wished for, she is confident it will still come true. Before they leave Forina, Max hears Jirachi's voice one last time, reminding him that they will always be friends.

== Cast ==
Character	Japanese	English
Ash Ketchum	Rica Matsumoto	Veronica Taylor
Pikachu/Kirlia (Japanese version)	Ikue Otani	Ikue Otani
May	KAORI	Veronica Taylor
Max	Fushigi Yamada	Amy Birnbaum
Brock	Yuuji Ueda	Eric Stuart
Narrator	Unshō Ishizuka	Mike Pollock
Jessie	Megumi Hayashibara	Rachael Lillis
James	Shinichiro Miki	Eric Stuart
Meowth	Inuko Inuyama	Maddie Blaustein
Wobbuffet	Yuuji Ueda	Kayzie Rogers
Butler	Kouichi Yamadera; Kenji Nojima (young)	Wayne Grayson
Diane	Riho Makise; Natsuki Yoshihara (young)	Megan Hollingshead
Bogie	Papaya Suzuki	Eric Stuart
Jirachi	Tomiko Suzuki	Kerry Williams
Absol	Megumi Hayashibara	Eric Stuart
Flygon	Shinichiro Miki	Shinichiro Miki

== Reception ==
The film was a box office hit. It made ¥4.5 billion at the Japanese box office. It became the second highest-grossing domestic film of the year in Japan.

== Release ==
=== Home media ===
The original Japanese DVD and VHS were released on December 19, 2003, by Media Factory. The English dub was released directly to VHS and DVD by Buena Vista Home Entertainment on June 1, 2004. This was the second Pokémon film (the first being Pokémon: Mewtwo Returns) to be released directly to DVD and VHS in the US. The film was released on DVD in the UK on October 23, 2006, to celebrate the Pokémon 10th Anniversary Tour in Britain. In the UK, the film was released by Paramount Home Entertainment.

The film has had a Blu-ray and DVD release in the US by Echo Bridge Home Entertainment on April 3, 2012, which is now out of print, as a Miramax Multi-Feature compilation with 3 other Pokémon films, Pokémon 4Ever, Pokémon Heroes and Pokémon: Destiny Deoxys.
