= Pokémon the Movie: Secrets of the Jungle =

2020 Pokémon film

- Release poster, designed and illustrated by Yoshitoshi Shinomiya

Japanese name
- Kanji: 劇場版ポケットモンスター ココ
- Literal meaning: Pocket Monsters the Movie: Coco
Transcriptions
- Revised Hepburn: Gekijō-ban Pokettomonsutā Koko
- Directed by: Tetsuo Yajima
- Screenplay by: Tetsuo Yajima; Atsuhiro Tomioka
- Based on: Pokémon by Satoshi Tajiri
- Starring: see below
- Music by: Taiiku Okazaki; Shinji Miyazaki; Shota Kageyama; Rei Ishizuka; Kenta Higashioji
- Production companies: OLM, Inc. OLM Digital
- Distributed by: Toho
- Release date: December 25, 2020 (Japan)
- Running time: 100 minutes
- Country: Japan
- Language: Japanese
- Box office: $23.6 million

Pokémon the Movie: Secrets of the Jungle (Note: Originally released in Japan as Pocket Monsters the Movie: Coco (劇場版ポケットモンスター ココ, Gekijō-ban Pokettomonsutā Koko)) is a 2020 Japanese anime film based on Satoshi Tajiri's Pokémon media franchise and produced by OLM. It is the twenty-third film of the Pokémon anime series, the third of the alternate timeline, a sequel to Pokémon the Movie: The Power of Us and the last film produced by OLM of the Pokémon franchise. The film returns to the series' traditional 2D art style rather than using the CGI animation used in Mewtwo Strikes Back: Evolution. It features the new Generation VIII Mythical Pokémon Zarude and a shiny Celebi.

In Japan, the film was released on December 25, 2020, by Toho. The original release date of July 10, 2020, was delayed due to the COVID-19 pandemic in Japan. The film released worldwide (excluding Japan, Korea and China) on Netflix on October 8, 2021.

For a limited time, if players of Pokémon Sword and Shield preordered tickets for this film's premiere, they would receive the Mythical Pokémon Zarude in its "Dada" form and a Shiny Celebi.

== Plot ==
In the Forest of Okoya, the Mythical Pokémon Zarude finds an infant boy in a cradle washed up on a riverbank. Unable to leave the child on his own, Zarude adopts him as a son, naming him "Koko". Zarude leaves his tribe, which inhabits a Great Tree deep in the jungle where humans are forbidden to venture, to raise Koko who grows up as a feral child.

Ten years later, Ash Ketchum and Pikachu visit the Forest of Okoya from nearby Milyfa Town. While attempting to capture a wild Cramorant, Ash and Pikachu encounter a research team from the Biotope Company, a scientific organization studying the jungle. Team Rocket, covertly following them, look up information on the Biotope Company and its leader Dr. Zed, and decide to infiltrate the group.

Later, Ash sees Koko go over a waterfall, after he got knocked out from a pipe while swinging on a vine, and retrieves him from the water, bringing him to Milyfa Town's Pokémon Center for treatment. When Koko awakens, he panics and escapes the building, having never seen other humans before. Discovering that Koko believes himself to be a Pokémon, Ash and Pikachu spend time with him in the town, helping him to learn about humans for the first time.

Ash, Pikachu and Koko later encounter Zarude, who is forced to admit the truth about Koko's heritage. Zarude brings them to an abandoned laboratory he found shortly after adopting Koko, where he shows them a photograph he found of an infant Koko with his human parents. Zarude then leaves, returning to the Great Tree alone.

Discovering a wallet from Biotope Company, Ash brings Koko to their headquarters, where they meet with Dr. Zed. He reveals that Koko's parents, Chrom and Phossa Molybdenum, were scientists who led the organization in researching the healing springs, and that Koko's real name is Al Molybdenum. However, Chrom and Phossa were killed in a car accident ten years ago, which was presumed to have killed Al as well. Zed scans Koko's pendant and discovers partially corrupted data on it that reveals an image of the Great Tree. Distraught over the news of his parents' fate, Koko flees to the Great Tree as well.

As soon as he reaches the Great Tree, Koko discovers a tracking chip planted on him by Zed. Zed arrives with his research team, which Team Rocket have infiltrated, along with a giant tank. Koko and Ash try to stop Zed, but he restrains them and throws them into the back of one of his trucks. He then fires missiles at the Great Tree, creating holes from which the spring water gushes forth. Ash, Pikachu and Koko escape with unwitting help from Team Rocket as they wrestle with the Cramorant from earlier and confront Zed, who suffers a psychotic breakdown and admits that, when Chrom and Phossa discovered the Great Tree's location but refused to continue researching it out of respect for the Zarude tribe, he killed them and stole their supply of the spring water. Before they perished, Chrom and Phossa sent the infant Al down the river with a drive containing the rest of their research, leading to Zarude finding him.

Zed seizes control of the tank from his henchmen, and Ash, Pikachu, and Koko try to fight him to no avail. Zarude arrives with his tribe, having convinced them to help save the jungle. He also brings a group of wild Pokémon, who previously disliked his tribe due to their selfish behavior, to assist. Zarude is injured in the battle and nearly succumbs, but Koko manages to harness the power of the jungle as if he were a Pokémon, healing him. With their combined forces, they manage to break the tank's power source, disabling it. Zed attempts to escape, but is captured by Koko and arrested by the police with the evidence leaked by Team Rocket, and the humans and Pokémon work together to restore the damage done to the jungle.

In the end, Koko decides to leave to explore the human world and become the bridge between humans and Pokémon, taking the photo of his parents along with him. As he and Ash leave the Forest of Okoya, they see Zarude turn the healing springs into a geyser to send Koko off. Cheered up by this, Koko goes forth into his future, embracing his dual identity as human and Zarude. At the Great Tree, Zarude sees a Shiny Celebi, which observes him now living in harmony with the other Pokémon.

== Voice cast ==
Character	Japanese voice actor	English dub actor
Ash Ketchum	Rica Matsumoto	Sarah Natochenny
Pikachu	Ikue Ōtani	Ikue Ōtani
Al Molybdenum / Koko	Moka Kamishiraishi	Kimlinh Tran
Jessie	Megumi Hayashibara	Michele Knotz
James	Shin'ichiro Miki	James Carter Cathcart
Meowth	Inuko Inuyama	James Carter Cathcart
Wobbuffet	Yuji Ueda	Erica Schroeder
Narrator	Kenyu Horiuchi	Rodger Parsons
Delia Ketchum	Masami Toyoshima	Sarah Natochenny
Zarude (Dada)	Nakamura Kankurō VI	Edward Bosco
Elder Zarude	Hiroshi Naka	Kellen Goff
Alpha Zarude	Kenjiro Tsuda	Ryan Andes
Sub-Alpha Zarude	KENN	Major Attaway
Dr. Zed	Kōichi Yamadera	Billy Kametz
Sharon	Shoko Nakagawa	Michelle Ruff
Chrom Molybdenum	Tokuyoshi Kawashima	Kaiji Tang
Phossa Molybdenum	Arisa Sekine	Lisa Ortiz
Mayor of Milyfa Town	Kenichi Ogata	Marc Thompson

== Music ==
Pokémon the Movie: Koko Music Collection (Japanese: 「劇場版ポケットモンスター ココ」ミュージックコレクション) is the official soundtrack of the movie that was released in Japan on December 23, 2020. Koko by Beverly is the Japanese opening theme for the movie. Pokémon the Movie: Koko Theme Song Collection (Japanese: 「劇場版ポケットモンスター ココ」テーマソング集), the album for the opening theme was also released on December 23, 2020.

The movie has 6 theme songs, all written by Taiiku Okazaki; this is the first time that a Pokémon movie had multiple theme songs all written by the same artist:

- The Rule Song (ft. SiM) (Insert Song)
- Koko (ft. Beverly) (Opening Theme Song)
- Show Window (Insert Song)
- The Hum of the Forest (Insert Song)
- Strange and Wonderful Creatures (Main Theme Song)
- I'm Home and Welcome Back (Ending Theme Song)

The film's English Dub instead uses three theme songs, "No Matter What" and "Always Safe", both performed by Cyn, and "My New Friends", performed by Ben Dixon and the Sad Truth.

== Release ==
=== Theatrical run ===
The film was released on December 25, 2020, in Japan. The original release date of July 10, 2020, was delayed due to the COVID-19 pandemic.

=== Home media ===
The film was released on DVD and Blu-ray in Japan on July 14, 2021, in Australia on May 11, 2022 by Shock Entertainment and in North America on October 18, 2022, it was never released in the United Kingdom or Ireland. In Germany, Polyband released the film on DVD and Blu-ray on 29 April 2022. The release had been announced in July 2021 by Polyband product manager Matthias Süß during an interview with the Pokémon podcast Miauz Genau!, with April 2022 initially given as the expected release window.

=== Streaming ===
The film was released worldwide on Netflix on October 8, 2021.

== Box office ==
In Japan, Pokémon the Movie: Secrets of the Jungle grossed ¥2.02 billion ($12.76 million) as of June 2021. Overseas, the film's September 2021 releases in China and South Korea grossed $5,045,865, for a worldwide total of $23,575,865.

== See also ==
- List of films based on video games
