= List of Pokémon films =

Pokémon
- Official Pokémon logo
- Based on: Pokémon by Satoshi Tajiri
- Production company: OLM, Inc.
- Distributed by: Toho
- Country: Japan
- Language: Japanese

Pokémon anime films release timeline
1998	Pokémon: The First Movie
1999	Pokémon the Movie 2000
2000	Pokémon 3: The Movie
2001	Pokémon 4Ever
2002	Pokémon Heroes
2003	Pokémon: Jirachi, Wish Maker
2004	Pokémon: Destiny Deoxys
2005	Pokémon: Lucario and the Mystery of Mew
2006	Pokémon Ranger and the Temple of the Sea
2007	Pokémon: The Rise of Darkrai
2008	Pokémon: Giratina and the Sky Warrior
2009	Pokémon: Arceus and the Jewel of Life
2010	Pokémon—Zoroark: Master of Illusions
2011	Pokémon the Movie: Black—Victini and Reshiram
2011	Pokémon the Movie: White—Victini and Zekrom
2012	Pokémon the Movie: Kyurem vs. the Sword of Justice
2013	Pokémon the Movie: Genesect and the Legend Awakened
2014	Pokémon the Movie: Diancie and the Cocoon of Destruction
2015	Pokémon the Movie: Hoopa and the Clash of Ages
2016	Pokémon the Movie: Volcanion and the Mechanical Marvel
2017	Pokémon the Movie: I Choose You!
2018	Pokémon the Movie: The Power of Us
2019	Pokémon: Mewtwo Strikes Back — Evolution
2020	Pokémon the Movie: Secrets of the Jungle
2021
2022
2023
2024
2025
2026
2027	Pokémon: Wild Card

Pokémon live action films release timeline
2019	Detective Pikachu

Pokémon is a media franchise created by video game designer Satoshi Tajiri that centers on fictional creatures called Pokémon. As of 2020, there have been twenty-three animated films and one live action film. The first nineteen animated films are based on the anime television series of the same name, while the twentieth, twenty-first, and twenty-third are set in an alternate continuity to the anime. The films are produced by animation studios OLM, Production I.G, Xebec, and Wit Studio, and distributed in Japan by Toho, with various studios distributing the films in North America. They were directed by Kunihiko Yuyama and Tetsuo Yajima and written by Takeshi Shudo, Hideki Sonoda, Atsuhiro Tomioka, Shōji Yonemura, Eiji Umehara, and Aya Takaha. The first Pokémon animated film, Pokémon: The First Movie, was released in Japan in 1998, and in 2019 was remade as Pokémon: Mewtwo Strikes Back – Evolution. A live-action film, Detective Pikachu, was produced by American studio Legendary Entertainment, directed by Rob Letterman, and written by Letterman and Nicole Perlman. It was distributed in Japan by Toho and outside of Japan and China by Warner Bros. Pictures. It was released on May 10, 2019.

The films star Pokémon Trainer Ash Ketchum and his partner Pokémon, Pikachu. Detective Pikachu is based on the 2016 video game Detective Pikachu and stars Ryan Reynolds as the motion capture role of Detective Pikachu, with Justice Smith and Kathryn Newton as the lead human roles.

There are also two animated television specials broadcast on TV Tokyo featuring Ash and his Pikachu and ten animated short films. Warner Bros. licensed the first three animated films in North America and Miramax Films licensed the following four films. From the eighth film onwards, licensing has been handled by The Pokémon Company International themselves, with various distributors handling the releases, such as Viz Media in North America.

The most recent film, Pokémon the Movie: Secrets of the Jungle, was originally set for release in Japanese theaters on July 10, 2020, but delayed to December 25, 2020, due to the COVID-19 pandemic. It was released on October 8, 2021, in the United States. The next film, Pokémon: Wild Card, will be directed by Katsuhiko Kitada at animation studio CloverWorks and is scheduled to be released in 2027.

== Anime films ==
No.	English title	Japanese title	Japanese release date	North American release date
1	Pokémon: The First Movie - Mewtwo Strikes Back	Mewtwo Strikes Back (ミュウツーの逆襲, Myūtsū no Gyakushū)	July 18, 1998	November 12, 1999
Ash, Misty, and Brock, along with several other Pokémon trainers, travel to New Island under the pretence that they will be battling a superior Pokémon Trainer. However, upon arrival there, they discover that the genetically engineered Pokémon Mewtwo, created by scientist Dr. Fuji for Giovanni of Team Rocket, sent the message and plans to conquer the world with an army of cloned Pokémon.
2	Pokémon the Movie 2000: The Power of One	Mirage Pokémon: Lugia's Explosive Birth (幻のポケモン ルギア爆誕, Maboroshi no Pokémon Rugia Bakutan)	July 17, 1999	July 21, 2000
Ash, Misty, and Tracey visit Shamouti Island, where Ash participates in a festival honoring Articuno, Zapdos, and Moltres. He becomes the chosen hero foretold in a prophecy who will save them from Pokémon Collector Lawrence III, who has captured them, disturbing the balance of the world, and seeks to capture the legendary Pokémon Lugia.
3	Pokémon 3: The Movie - Spell of the Unown	Emperor of The Crystal Tower: ENTEI (結晶塔の帝王 ENTEI, Kesshōtō no Teiō Entei)	July 8, 2000	April 6, 2001
Ash, Misty, and Brock must rescue Ash's mother, Delia, from Molly Hale, a lonely young girl who, after her father, Spencer, disappeared while researching the Pokémon Unown, befriended the Unown, who created an illusion of the Legendary Pokémon Entei to be her father figure.
4	Pokémon 4Ever: Celebi - Voice of the Forest	Serebī: The Meeting that Traversed Time (セレビィ 時を超えた遭遇（であい）, Celebi Toki o Koeta Deai)	July 7, 2001	October 11, 2002
Ash, Misty, and Brock meet Sam, a boy from forty years in the past, and the Mythical Pokémon Celebi, who brought him to the present and is being hunted down by the evil Iron-Masked Marauder, a member of Team Rocket whose Dark Balls are turning Pokémon evil.
5	Pokémon Heroes: Latios and Latias	Guardian Gods of the Capital of Water: Latias and Latios (水の都の護神 ラティアスとラティオス, Mizu no Miyako no Mamorigami Ratiasu to Ratiosu)	July 13, 2002	May 16, 2003
Ash, Misty, and Brock's trip to the city of Alto Mare is interrupted when Annie and Oakley, thieves and members of Team Rocket, seek to steal the Soul Dew, a crystal that holds the essence of the Legendary Pokémon Latios and Latias and protects the city.
6	Jirachi, Wish Maker	Wishing Star of the Seven Nights: Jirachi (七夜の願い星 ジラーチ, Nanayo no Negaiboshi Jirāchi)	July 19, 2003	June 1, 2004
Ash, May, Max, and Brock meet the Mythical Pokémon Jirachi, who awakens for one week every thousand years to grant a wish, and must save it from former Team Magma member Butler.
7	Destiny Deoxys	Visitor from the Sky-Splitting: Deoxys (裂空の訪問者 デオキシス, Rekkū no Hōmonsha Deokishisu)	July 17, 2004	January 22, 2005
Ash, May, Max, and Brock visit LaRousse City, which is under attack from the extraterrestrial Pokémon Deoxys and the Legendary Pokémon Rayquaza, and meet a young boy named Tori who is afraid of Pokémon.
8	Lucario and the Mystery of Mew	Mew and the Aura Hero: Lucario (ミュウと波導（はどう）の勇者 ルカリオ, Mew to Hadō no Yūsha Rukario)	July 16, 2005	September 19, 2006
After an ancient Lucario is reawakened, Ash, May, Max, and Brock help it discover the events that led to its abandonment by Sir Aaron, a man revered as a hero, while saving Pikachu, Meowth, and the Mythical Pokémon Mew from the dying Tree of World's Beginning.
9	Pokémon Ranger and the Temple of the Sea	The Pokémon Ranger and the Prince of the Sea: Manaphy (ポケモンレンジャーと蒼海（うみ）の王子 マナフィ, Pokémon Renjā to Umi no Ōji Manafī)	July 15, 2006	March 23, 2007
Ash, May, Max, and Brock must help the Pokémon Ranger Jack Walker and the Marina Group, descendants of the People of the Water, deliver the Mythical Pokémon Manaphy to the undersea temple Samiya while being pursued by the evil pirate Phantom.
10	The Rise of Darkrai	Dialga VS Palkia VS Darkrai (ディアルガVSパルキアVSダークライ, Diaruga Tai Parukia Tai Dākurai)	July 14, 2007	February 24, 2008
Ash, Dawn, and Brock must save Alamos Town from the powers of the Legendary Pokémon Dialga and Palkia and clear the name of a Darkrai whose foreboding nature has led the townspeople to believe it is involved in the destruction of the town.
11	Giratina & the Sky Warrior	Giratina and the Bouquet of the Frozen Sky: Shaymin (ギラティナと氷空（そら）の花束 シェイミ, Giratina to Sora no Hanataba Sheimi)	July 19, 2008	February 13, 2009
Ash, Dawn, and Brock must help the Mythical Pokémon Shaymin return to the Gracidea Flower garden to participate in a flower bearing ceremony while Giratina and Dialga battle in the Pokémon world and the Reverse World.
12	Arceus and the Jewel of Life	Arceus: To Conquering Space-Time (アルセウス 超克の時空へ, Aruseusu Chōkoku no Jikū e)	July 18, 2009	November 20, 2009
Ash, Dawn, and Brock travel to Michina Town, where they discover that the Mythical Pokémon Arceus is upset over the town betraying it thousands of years ago. When Dialga, Palkia, and Giratina are unable to stop it, they are sent back in time to change the past in order to change the present for the better.
13	Zoroark: Master of Illusions	Phantom Ruler: Zoroark (幻影の覇者 ゾロアーク, Gen'ei no Hasha Zoroāku)	July 10, 2010	February 5, 2011
Ash, Dawn, and Brock arrive in Crown City for the Pokémon Baccer World Cup, but discover that a Zoroark, under the control of the evil businessman Grings Kodai, is causing havoc disguised as the Legendary Pokémon Entei, Raikou and Suicune. Zoroark's child Zorua asks for their help to save his mother from Kodai, who seeks Celebi and its ability to travel through time.
14	Black — Victini and Reshiram	Victini and the White Hero: Reshiram (ビクティニと白き英雄 レシラム, Victini to Shiroki Eiyū Reshiramu)	July 16, 2011	December 10, 2011
14	White — Victini and Zekrom	Victini and the Black Hero: Zekrom (ビクティニと黒き英雄ゼクロム, Bikutini to Kuroki Eiyū Sekuromu)	July 16, 2011	December 3, 2011
Ash, Iris, and Cilan travel to Eindoak Town to participate in a tournament, where they meet the Mythical Pokémon Victini and must stop Damon, a descendant of Eindoak's ancient People of the Vale, who seeks to use the power of the Legendary Pokémon Zekrom (Note: In Black—Victini and Reshiram.) or Reshiram (Note: In White—Victini and Zekrom.) and the Dragon Force to restore the Kingdom of the Vale to its former glory, but this power threatens to destroy the world.
15	Kyurem vs. the Sword of Justice	Kyurem vs. the Sacred Swordsman: Keldeo (キュレムVS聖剣士 ケルディオ, Kyurem tai Seikenshi Kerudio)	July 14, 2012	December 8, 2012
Ash, Iris, and Cilan must help the Mythical Pokémon Keldeo escape from the Legendary Pokémon Kyurem, who seeks to battle it after freezing the Sacred Swordsmen Cobalion, Terrakion, and Virizion.
16	Genesect and the Legend Awakened	ExtremeSpeed Genesect: Mewtwo Awakens (神速のゲノセクト ミュウツー覚醒, Shinsoku no Genesect Myūtsū Kakusei)	July 13, 2013	October 19, 2013
Ash, Iris, and Cilan visit New Tork City and the Pokémon Hills park and ally with a Mewtwo to protect the city from a group of Genesect who are angry over losing their home.
17	Diancie and the Cocoon of Destruction	Diancie and the Cocoon of Destruction (破壊の繭とディアンシー, Hakai no Mayu to Dianshī)	July 19, 2014	November 8, 2014
When the Mythical Pokémon Diancie cannot figure out how to make a new Heart Diamond to save her kingdom and her Carbink subjects, she seeks out the Legendary Pokémon Xerneas for help. Along the way, she meets Ash, Serena, Clemont, and Bonnie, who help her escape from those who seek to exploit her power, including Marilyn Flame and Ninja Riot, a duo of jewel thieves, and Argus Steel and his daughter Millis, amidst the awakening of the Legendary Pokémon Yveltal.
18	Hoopa and the Clash of Ages	The Archdjinni of the Rings: Hoopa (光輪の超魔神 フーパ, Ring no Chōmajin Hūpa)	July 18, 2015	December 19, 2015
Ash, Serena, Clemont, and Bonnie are summoned to Dahara City, a desert city by the sea, through the powers of the Mythical Pokémon Hoopa, who has the ability to summon things, including people and Pokémon, through its magic rings. They learn of a hero who, 100 years ago, stopped Hoopa, who went on a rampage after transforming into Hoopa Unbound, by sealing away Hoopa's power in the Prison Bottle. After Hoopa's shadow escapes from the Prison Bottle and attempts to take over Hoopa, it leads to a clash between several Legendary Pokémon after Hoopa summons them.
19	Volcanion and the Mechanical Marvel	Volcanion and the Exquisite Magearna (ボルケニオンと機巧のマギアナ, Borukenion to Karakuri no Makiana)	July 16, 2016	December 5, 2016
Ash, Serena, Clemont, and Bonnie encounter the Mythical Pokémon Volcanion, who Ash becomes bonded to through an unknown force. Volcanion, who hates humans, is forced to bring Ash along as it heads for the Azoth Kingdom to rescue the artificial Mythical Pokémon Magearna from Alva, a corrupt minister who seeks to use Magearna's power to conquer the Kingdom.
20	I Choose You!	I Choose You! (キミにきめた！, Kimi Ni Kimeta!)	July 15, 2017	November 25, 2017
An alternate retelling of the first season of the original series. Ash Ketchum, a ten-year-old boy from Pallet Town, begins his adventures as a Pokémon Trainer after receiving his first Pokémon, Pikachu, from Professor Oak. After witnessing a Rainbow Wing fall from the Legendary Pokémon Ho-Oh, he and his companions Sorrel and Verity, set out to find it at Mount Tensei. Along the way, they encounter the Mythical Pokémon Marshadow while Ash contends with his rival, the Pokémon Trainer Cross.
21	The Power of Us	Everyone's Story (みんなの物語, Minna no Monogatari)	July 13, 2018	December 8, 2018
At the seaside Fula City, Ash participates in the annual Wind Festival, which is held to celebrate the Legendary Pokémon Lugia, who brings the wind that powers the city. Along with athlete and Pokémon Trainer Risa, compulsive liar Callahan, shy researcher Torren, bitter old woman Harriet, and Margo, the daughter of the city's mayor, Oliver, must save the city from a wildfire and a cloud of Effect Spore with help from the Mythical Pokémon Zeraora.
22	Mewtwo Strikes Back: Evolution	Mewtwo Strikes Back: Evolution (ミュウツーの逆襲 EVOLUTION, Myūtsū no Gyakushū Eboryūshon)	July 12, 2019	February 27, 2020 (Netflix)
Animated remake of The First Movie: Mewtwo Strikes Back.
23	Secrets of the Jungle	Coco (ココ, Koko)	December 25, 2020 (Note: The movie was originally scheduled to be released on July 10, 2020, but the release was suspended due to the COVID-19 pandemic.)	October 8, 2021
Ash and Pikachu encounter Koko, a young boy who Zarude took in following the death of his parents and believes himself to be a Pokémon due to being raised by one. They help him uncover his true identity and past, which is connected to Dr. Zed and a plot by the Biotope Company that threatens to destroy Zarude's home, the Forest of Okoya.
24	Pokémon: Wild Card	Pokémon: Wild Card (ポケモン：ワイルドカード, Pokemon: Wairudo Kādo)	2027	

== Live-action films ==
The launch of the mobile game Pokémon Go in 2016 reignited mainstream interest in the Pokémon franchise in the Western market since its initial peak in the early 2000s, and various Hollywood film companies approached The Pokémon Company to gain film rights. Eventually, Warner Bros. Pictures and Legendary Entertainment struck a deal to produce a live-action adaptation of the 2018 video game Detective Pikachu; Pokémon Detective Pikachu, the first official live-action Pokémon film. In January 2019, ahead of the film's release, Legendary began development on a sequel.

No.	English title	Japanese title	North American release date	Japanese release date
1	Detective Pikachu	Meitantei Pikachū (名探偵ピカチュウ)	May 10, 2019	May 3, 2019
In Ryme City, where humans and Pokémon live together, Tim Goodman partners with a talking Detective Pikachu to solve the mystery behind the disappearance of his father Harry, who was presumed dead in a car crash.

== Pikachu shorts ==
Pikachu shorts are a series of twenty-seven animated short films shown at the start of animated theatrical films based on Pokémon, and have also been shown on ANA flights in Japan and released during Christmas as Pikachu's Winter Vacation.

No.	English title	Japanese title	Japanese release date	North American release date
1	Pikachu's Vacation	Pikachu's Summer Vacation (ピカチュウのなつやすみ, Pikachū no Natsuyasumi)	July 18, 1998	November 12, 1999
When Ash Ketchum and his friends discover a Pokémon-only vacation resort, they decide to let their Pokémon have a day of fun while they relax.
2	Christmas Night	Let's Play on Christmas (クリスマスであそぼ!, Kurisumasu de Asobo!)	December 22, 1998	November 25, 2006
Pikachu, Togepi, and Ash, Misty, and Brock's Pokémon cause havoc on Christmas Eve.
3	Kanga Games	Let's Play in the Snow! (雪であそぼ!, Yuki de Asobo!)	December 22, 1998	November 25, 2006
The Pokémon explore a mountain.
4	Pikachu's Rescue Adventure	The Pikachu Expedition (ピカチュウたんけんたい, Pikachū Tankentai)	July 17, 1999	July 21, 2000
Ash, Misty, and Tracey's Pokémon sneak away on vacation when a storm kicks up.
5	Winter Games	Let's Play on the Ice? (こおであそぼ!, Ko o de a Sobo!)	December 22, 1999	November 23, 2004
Pikachu and his friends partake in winter games.
6	Stantler's Little Helpers	Christmas Night (クリスマスの夜, Kurisumasu no Yoru)	December 22, 1999	November 23, 2004
Pikachu and his friends help Stantler be on a sleigh team.
7	Pikachu & Pichu	Pichu and Pikachu (ピチューとピカチュウ, Pichū to Pikachū)	July 8, 2000	April 6, 2001
While in a city, Pikachu wanders off and meets a pair of mischievous Pichu brothers.
8	Delibird's Dilemma	Delibird's Present (デリバードのプレゼント, Deribādo no Purezento)	December 22, 2000	June 17, 2006
Ash, Misty, and Brock's Pokémon must find Santa's missing presents before midnight.
9	Snorlax Snowman	White Story (ホワイトストーリ, Howaito Sutōrī)	December 22, 2000	June 17, 2006
A retelling of Frosty the Snowman, starring the same Pokémon and a Snorlax-shaped snowman.
10	Pikachu's PikaBoo	Pikachu's Exciting Hide-and-Seek (ピカチュウのドキドキかくれんぼ, Pikachū no Dokidoki Kakurenbo)	July 7, 2001	March 18, 2003
Pikachu and Ash and Misty's Pokémon play hide-and-seek in a mansion and its gardens.
11	Camp Pikachu	Pikapika Starry Sky Camp (ピカピカ星空キャンプ, Pikapika Hoshizora Kyanpu)	July 13, 2002	January 20, 2004
Pikachu reunites with the Pichu brothers and they have a campout with Ash and Misty's Pokémon.
12	Gotta Dance!	Secret Base of the Dancing Pokémon (おどるポケモンひみつ基地, Odoru Pokemon Himitsu Kichi)	July 19, 2003	June 1, 2004
Pikachu and Ash, May, and Brock's Pokémon have a dance with Meowth.
13	Pikachu's Summer Festival	Pikachu's Summer Festival (ピカチュウのなつまつり, Pikachū no Natsumatsuri)	August 1, 2004	Unaired
Pikachu and his friends enjoy a summer festival.
14	Pokémon 3D Adventure: Find Mew!	Pokémon 3D Adventure: Find Mew! (ポケモン3Dアドベンチャー ミュウを探せ!, Pokémon 3D Adobencha: Myū o Saga se!)	March 18, 2005	Unaired
Pikachu and his friends find Mew.
15	Pikachu's Ghost Carnival	Pikachu's Ghost Carnival (ピカチュウのおばケカーニバル, Pikachū no oba Karnibaru)	August 1, 2005	Unaired
Pikachu and his friends enjoy the Ghost Festival.
16	Pokémon 4D: Pikachu's Ocean Adventure	Pokémon 3D Adventure 2: Pikachu's Grand Ocean-Floor Adventure (ポケモン3Dアドベンチャー2 ピカチュウ海底大冒険, Pokémon 3D Adobencha 2: Pikachū Kai Soko o Bōken)	May 20, 2006	July 1, 2008
Pikachu and his friends go on an ocean adventure.
17	Pikachu's Island Adventure	Pikachu's Naughty Island (ピカチュウのわんぱくアイランド, Pikachū no Wan Airando)	August 1, 2006	April 1, 2007
Pikachu and his friends go on an island adventure.
18	Pikachu's Exploration Club	Pikachu's Exploration Club (ピカチュウの探検クラブ, Pikachū no Saga Ken Kurabu)	August 1, 2007	Unaired
Pikachu and his friends join the exploration club.
19	Pikachu's Ice Adventure	Pikachu's Ice Adventure (ピカチュウ 冰の大冒険, Pikachū Hi no o Bōken)	August 1, 2008	Unaired
Pikachu and his friends go on an ice adventure.
20	Pikachu's Sparkle Search!	Pikachu's Sparkle Search! (ピカチュウのキラキラだいそうさく!, Pikachū no Kira Kira dai Sō Saku!)	August 1, 2009	Unaired
Pikachu and his friends search for something during an adventure.
21	Pikachu's Strange Wonder Adventure	Pikachu's Strange Wonder Adventure (ピカチュウのふしざな大冒険, Pikachū no Fushi Zana o Bōken)	August 1, 2010	Unaired
Pikachu and his friends go on a strange adventure.
22	Pikachu's Summer Bridge Story	Pikachu's Summer Bridge Story (ピカチュウのサマー・ブリッジ・ストーリー, Pikachū bo Sama Burijī Sutori)	August 1, 2011	Unaired
Pikachu and his friends enjoy a summer bridge story.
23	Sing Meloetta: Search for the Rinka Berries	Sing Meloetta: Search for the Rinka Berries (うたえメロエッタ リンカのみをさがせ, Uta e Meroetta: Rinka no mi o saga se)	July 3, 2012	Unaired
Pikachu, his friends, and Meloetta search for Rinka berries.
24	Meloetta's Moonlight Serenade	Meloetta's Sparkling Recital (メロエッタのキラキラリサイタル, Meroetta no Kirakira Risaitaru)	July 14, 2012	February 15, 2013
Pikachu, Pansage, Oshawott, Snivy, their trainers' Pokémon, and Pokémon from other regions help Meloetta retrieve a tree's special berries.
25	Eevee & Friends	Pikachu and its Eievui Friends (ピカチュウとイーブイ☆フレンズ, Pikachū to Ībui Furenzu)	July 13, 2013	December 6, 2013
Pikachu and friends meet an Eevee and its evolved brothers and sisters, including Sylveon.
26	Pikachu, What's This Key?	Pikachu, What's This Key For? (ピカチュウ、これなんのカギ？, Pikachū, Kore Nan no Kagi?)	July 19, 2014	February 2, 2015
Pikachu and the Pokémon of Ash and his friends meet a Klefki who possesses keys that open up portals to other worlds.
27	Pikachu and the Pokémon Music Squad	Pikachu and the Pokémon Band (ピカチュウとポケモンおんがくたい, Pikachū to Pokémon on gaku Tai)	July 18, 2015	December 21, 2015
Pikachu and the Pokémon of Ash and his friends sing and dance together.

== Television specials ==
These television specials, which run longer than the normal half-hour and are usually not separated into more than one episode in either the original or the dub, are often considered TV Pokémon movies, not counting towards the running total. They do not air in theaters, but are instead broadcast on the same networks that the anime is broadcast on for their premieres. Though they may air around the same time as episodes of the anime, usually in the anime's normal timeslot, they are not assigned episode numbers.

English title	Japanese title	Japanese release date	North American release date
Pokémon: Mewtwo Returns (Pokémon TV Special)	Mewtwo! I Am Here (ミュウツー！ 我はココニ在リ, Myūtsū! Ware wa Koko ni Ari)	December 30, 2000	December 4, 2001
When Giovanni manages locates Mewtwo, who has been hiding out in the Johto region since he was last seen, and leads a large Team Rocket force whom he seeks to recapture him to use for his own purposes. Ash and his friends must help out Mewtwo and the clones from Team Rocket's cruel plan.
The Mastermind of Mirage Pokémon	The Terrifying Mirage Pokémon (戦慄のミラージュポケモン, Senritsu no Mirāju Pokemon)	October 13, 2006	April 29, 2006
Ash, May, Max, and Brock meet up with Misty and Professor Oak to investigate Dr. Yung's new Mirage Pokémon system. When the mysterious Mirage Master appears with a Mirage Mewtwo, Ash is forced to fight him to stop his plans of world domination using the Mirage Pokémon.

== Home media ==
=== Region 2 (Japan) ===
Name	Rental Date	Sale Date	Discs
Gekijōban Pikachu no Natsuyasumi / Mewtwo no Gyakushū	June 23, 2000		1
Gekijōban Pikachu Tankentai / Maboroshi no Pokémon Lugia Bakutan	November 22, 2000		1
Gekijōban Pichu to Pikachu / Kesshōtō no Teiō	July 7, 2001		1
Gekijōban Pikachu no Dokidoki Kakurenbo	November 23, 2001	December 7, 2001	1
Gekijōban Celebi Toki o Koeta Deai	January 25, 2002	February 8, 2002	1
Gekijōban Pikapika Hoshizora Camp	November 22, 2002		1
Gekijōban Mizu no Miyako no Mamorigami Latias to Latios	December 20, 2002		1
PIKACHU THE MOVIE BOX 1998–2002	–	September 21, 2007	6
Gekijōban Odoru Pokémon Himitsu Kichi	November 28, 2003		1
Gekijōban Nanayo no Negaiboshi Jirachi	December 19, 2003		1
Advanced Generation Rekkū no Hōmonsha Deoxys	December 21, 2004		1
Advanced Generation Mew to Hadō no Yūsha Lucario	December 22, 2005		1
Advanced Generation Pokémon Ranger to Umi no Ōji Manaphy	December 22, 2006		1
PIKACHU THE MOVIE BOX 2003–2006	–	September 21, 2007	6
Diamond & Pearl Dialga VS Palkia VS Darkrai	December 21, 2007		1
Diamond & Pearl Giratina to Sora no Hanataba Shaymin	December 19, 2008		1
Diamond & Pearl Arceus Chōkoku no Jikū e	December 18, 2009		1

== Critical reception ==
Film	Rotten Tomatoes	Metacritic
Pokémon: The First Movie	16% (91 reviews)	35 (25 reviews)
Pokémon: The Movie 2000	19% (69 reviews)	28 (20 reviews)
Pokémon 3: The Movie	21% (57 reviews)	22 (18 reviews)
Pokémon 4Ever	16% (38 reviews)	25 (16 reviews)
Pokémon Heroes	17% (41 reviews)	27 (17 reviews)
Pokémon: Jirachi, Wish Maker	N/A	N/A
Pokémon: Destiny Deoxys	N/A	N/A
Pokémon: Lucario and the Mystery of Mew	N/A	N/A
Pokémon Ranger and the Temple of the Sea	N/A	N/A
Pokémon: The Rise of Darkrai	N/A	N/A
Pokémon: Giratina and the Sky Warrior	N/A	N/A
Pokémon: Arceus and the Jewel of Life	N/A	N/A
Pokémon: Zoroark: Master of Illusions	N/A	N/A
Pokémon the Movie: Black—Victini and Reshiram and White—Victini and Zekrom	N/A	N/A
Pokémon the Movie: Kyurem vs. the Sword of Justice	N/A	N/A
Pokémon the Movie: Genesect and the Legend Awakened	N/A	N/A
Pokémon the Movie: Diancie and the Cocoon of Destruction	N/A	N/A
Pokémon the Movie: Hoopa and the Clash of Ages	N/A	N/A
Pokémon the Movie: Volcanion and the Mechanical Marvel	N/A	N/A
Pokémon the Movie: I Choose You!	33% (9 reviews)	N/A
Pokémon the Movie: The Power of Us	71% (7 reviews)	N/A
Pokémon: Mewtwo Strikes Back—Evolution	44% (9 reviews)	N/A
Pokémon Detective Pikachu	68% (312 reviews)	53 (48 reviews)
Pokémon the Movie: Secrets of the Jungle	N/A	N/A
