= Unshō Ishizuka =

Japanese voice actor, narrator, and director (1951–2018)

- 石塚 運昇
- Born: Yukinori Ishizuka (石塚 運昇) (Note: The kanji in his real name and stage name are written in the same way but the pronunciations are different.); May 16, 1951; Katsuyama, Fukui, Japan
- Died: August 13, 2018 (aged 67); Tokyo, Japan
- Occupations: Actor; voice actor; narrator; theatre director
- Years active: 1984–2018
- Agent: Aoni Production
- Height: 168 cm (5 ft 6 in)

Unshō Ishizuka (石塚 運昇, Ishizuka Unshō; May 16, 1951 – August 13, 2018) was a Japanese actor, voice actor, narrator and theatre director from Katsuyama, Fukui. He was affiliated with Aoni Production at the time of his death and was known for providing the voice of both the narrator and Professor Oak/Dr. Yukinari Okido on the Japanese anime series Pokémon. In addition to that, he regularly appeared in both the Japanese and English-language versions of the Pokémon anime, voicing Onix, Steelix and numerous other Pokémon.

Ishizuka was known for his deep, strong voice and was often cast in the role of older mature male characters, such as Jet Black from Cowboy Bebop, Eugene Gallardo from Tales of Rebirth and Captain Matthews in the Xenosaga trilogy. He was also the Japanese dub voice of Captain Gantu in every version of Lilo & Stitch to date. He was also the fourth Japanese voice of Heihachi Mishima in the Tekken video game series, and the second Japanese voice for Mr. Satan in the Dragon Ball franchise, taking over both roles since the death of longtime actor Daisuke Gōri. He has voiced the roles of Kizaru in the One Piece series, Van Hohenheim in the Fullmetal Alchemist: Brotherhood series, Zabuza Momochi in the Naruto series, Ginzo Nakamori in Detective Conan and Magic Kaito, Older Joseph Joestar in JoJo's Bizarre Adventure: Stardust Crusaders and JoJo's Bizarre Adventure: Diamond Is Unbreakable, as well as Bunta Fujiwara in Initial D, Ryotaro Dojima in Persona 4 and Ujiyasu Hōjō in Samurai Warriors and Warriors Orochi. Ishizuka was also the famous voice-over actor for Liam Neeson, Laurence Fishburne and Kevin Spacey.

On August 17, 2018, it was reported that Ishizuka had died on August 13, at the age of 67 from a colon infection caused by an esophageal tumor.

== Filmography ==
=== Television animation ===
1984

- Giant Gorg (Narrator)
- Yoroshiku Mechadock (Toshimitsu Watanabe)

1987

- Metal Armor Dragonar (Narrator)

1988

- Mashin Hero Wataru (Don Girara, Don Quixote, Muko Khan)

1989

- Lupin the 3rd: Bye Bye, Lady Liberty (Johns)

1990

- Musashi, the Samurai Lord (Nobunaga)

1991

- Dragon Quest: The Adventure of Dai (Baran)
- Yokoyama Mitsuteru Sangokushi (Zhou Yu)

1992

- Lupin the 3rd: From Siberia with Love (Lucky McDonald)

1993

- Kenyū Densetsu Yaiba (Raizou)
- Slam Dunk (Moichi Taoka)
- Lupin III: Voyage to Danger (Keith Haydon)

1994

- Blue Seed (Secretary)

1996

- Virtua Fighter (Wolf Hawkfield)
- After War Gundam X (Aimzat Kartral)
- Violinist of Hamelin (Hell King Bass)
- Pretty Soldier Sailor Moon Sailor Stars (Tetsurou Yoshinogawa/Sailor Chef)
- Detective Conan (Souhei Tatsumi)
- Rurouni Kenshin (Fuji)

1997

- Virus Buster Serge (Dixon)
- In the Beginning: The Bible Stories (David, Abimelech, Cyrus)
- Berserk (Narrator, Void)
- Battle Athletes Victory (Daizaemon Kanzaki)
- Hareluya II Boy (Gouda)
- Pokémon (Professor Oak, Narrator, Additional Voices)
- Maze (Asterote "Aster" Reighe)
- Detective Conan (Detective Nakamori)
- Flame of Recca (Kuukai)

1998

- Initial D (Bunta Fujiwara)
- Cowboy Bebop (Jet Black)
- Gasaraki (Prime Minister)
- Devilman Lady (Katsumi Seta)
- Trigun (Brilliant Dynamites Neon)
- Yu-Gi-Oh! (Gozaburo Kaiba)

1999

- Initial D: Second Stage (Bunta Fujiwara)
- The Big O (Alex Rosewater)
- GTO: Great Teacher Onizuka (Kizaki)
- Pocket Monsters: Episode Orange Archipelago (Dr. Okido, Narrator, Additional Voices)
- Pocket Monsters: Episode Gold & Silver (Dr. Okido, Narrator, Additional Voices)
- Crest of the Stars (Entryus)
- Tenshi ni Narumon (Yuuka)
- One Piece (Kizaru, Koshiro, Kong)

2000

- Vandread (Rabat)
- Hajime no Ippo (Miyata's Father)
- Mewtwo! I Am Here (Iwaku, Kunugidama, Narrator)

2001

- Vandread: The Second Stage (Rabat)
- Steel Angel Kurumi 2 (Tenkai Sumeragi)
- Samurai Girl Real Bout High School (Takao Todo)
- Digimon Tamers (Vajramon)
- Najica Blitz Tactics (Gento Kuraku)
- Hellsing (Peter Ferguson)
- Mahoromatic (Narrator)

2002

- Ai Yori Aoshi (Mayu's Father)
- Cyborg 009 The Cyborg Soldier (Claus Van Bogoot)
- Naruto (Zabuza Momochi)
- Pocket Monster Side Stories (Dr. Okido, Narrator, Additional Voices)
- Pocket Monsters: Advanced Generation (Dr. Okido, Narrator, Additional Voices)
- Figure 17 (Desk Staff)
- Mahoromatic: Something More Beautiful (Hayato Daimon)

2003

- Astro Boy (Boone)
- Wolf's Rain (Quent Yaiden)
- Air Master (Lucha Master)
- Sou Nanda (Eureka Tower)
- Gad Guard (Kogoro Hachisuka)
- Kaleido Star (Jerry)
- Cromartie High School (Narrator)
- The Big O 2 (Alex Rosewater)
- Planetes (Dr. Werner Locksmith)
- Tank Knights Portriss (File Hook)
- Last Exile (Godwyn)

2004

- Initial D: Fourth Stage (Bunta Fujiwara)
- Diamond Daydreams (Kiichi Harada)
- Kyo kara Maoh! (Stoffel von Spitzweg)
- Zatch Bell! (Gustav)
- Saiyuki Gunlock (Yakumo)
- Samurai Champloo (Nokogiri Manzou)
- Zipang (Eiichiro Taki)
- Beet the Vandel Buster (Bertoz)
- Monster (Narrator, Yarka)

2005

- Fighting Beauty Wulong (Cao Da Hen)
- Gallery Fake (Senju's Father)
- Guyver: The Bioboosted Armor (Oswald . A . Lisker/Guyver II)
- Eureka Seven (Britani)
- Aquarion (Gen Fudou)
- Black Jack (Suguru Tenma)
- Minami no Shima no Chiisana Hikouki Birdy (Big Papa)

2006

- ARIA The NATURAL (Gentleman)
- Oban Star-Racers (Don Wei)
- The Third: The Girl with the Blue Eye (Bogie)
- Kenichi: The Mightiest Disciple (Shio Sakaki)
- NANA (Goro Komatsu)
- Happy Lucky Bikkuriman (Chronos)
- Pocket Monsters: Diamond & Pearl (Dr. Okido, Narrator, Additional Voices)
- Yomigaeru Sora – Rescue Wings (Shuujirou Hongou)

2007

- Mobile Suit Gundam 00 (Sergei Smirnov, Spanish Assembly Member)
- Gintama (Kozenigata Heiji)
- Gegege no Kitarō (Makura-Kaeshi, Tenome)
- The Skull Man (Alucard van Bogeuto)
- Neuro: Supernatural Detective (Yūsuke Sugita)
- Moonlight Mile (Chris Jefferson, Instructor)

2008

- Aria the Origination (Owner)
- Kaiba (Baby)
- Mobile Suit Gundam 00 Second Season (Sergei Smirnov)
- Kyo kara Maoh! 3rd Series (Stoffel von Spitzweg)
- Golgo 13 (Sam Cheyenne)
- Stitch! (Gantu)
- Birdy the Mighty: Decode (Georg Gomez)
- Library War (Library Defense Force Officer)
- Blassreiter (Gerd Frentzen, Shido Kasugi)

2009

- Guin Saga (Marus)
- Stitch!: Itazura Alien no Daibōken (Gantu)
- Birdy the Mighty Decode:02 (Georg Gomez)
- Naruto: Shippuden (Zabuza Momochi)
- Fullmetal Alchemist: Brotherhood (Van Hohenheim)
- Hajime no Ippo: New Challenger (Miyata's Father)

2010

- Iron Man (Defense Minister Kuroda, Rasetsu)
- House of Five Leaves (Benzou)
- Stitch!: Zutto Saikō no Tomodachi (Gantu)
- Strike Witches 2 (General A)
- Sound of the Sky (Klaus)
- Dragon Ball Kai (Mr. Satan)
- Heroman (Gogol)
- Pocket Monsters: Best Wishes! (Dr. Okido, Narrator, Additional Voices)
- Magic Kaito (Ginzō Nakamori)
- Rainbow: Nisha Rokubō no Shichinin (Higashida)

2011

- Gintama' (Heiji Kozenigata)
- Gosick (Jupiter Roget)
- The Mystic Archives of Dantalian (Kendrick)
- Chihayafuru (Dr. Harada)
- Persona 4: The Animation (Ryōtarō Dōjima)

2012

- Initial D: Fifth Stage (Bunta Fujiwara)
- Campione! (Sasha Dejanstahl Voban)
- Sankarea: Undying Love (Dan'ichirō Sanka)
- Humanity Has Declined (Grandpa)
- Naruto: Shippuden (Zabuza Momochi)
- Stitch to Suna no Wakusei (Gantu)
- Hyouka (Hanai)
- Brave10 (Ieyasu Tokugawa)
- Jormungand (Lehm)
- Jormungand Perfect Order (Lehm)

2013

- Star Blazers 2199 (Ryū Hijikata)
- Attack on Titan (Mr. Leonhardt)
- Unlimited Psychic Squad (Doga)
- Gargantia on the Verdurous Planet (Agitator)
- Chihayafuru 2 (Dr. Harada)
- Tokyo Ravens (Iwao Miyachi)
- Toriko (Darnil Kahn)
- Neppu Kairiku Bushi Road (Sanda)
- Pocket Monsters: Best Wishes! Season 2: Episode N (Dr. Okido, Narrator, Additional Voices)
- Pocket Monsters: Best Wishes! Season 2: Decolora Adventure (Dr. Okido, Narrator, Additional Voices)
- Pocket Monsters XY (Dr. Okido, Narrator, Additional Voices)

2014

- Initial D: Final Stage (Bunta Fujiwara)
- JoJo's Bizarre Adventure: Stardust Crusaders (Joseph Joestar)
- Space Dandy (Dr. Gel)
- Sengoku Musou SP: Sanada no Shou (Narrator)
- Girl Friend Beta (Alien, Kumamoto Castle, Shiba Inu, Sea-Monkeys) (Episode 7)
- Terraformars (Sylvester Asimov)
- Hajime no Ippo Rising (Miyata's Father)
- Black Bullet (Sōgen Saitake)
- Persona 4 the Golden Animation (Ryōtarō Dōjima)
- Magic Kaito 1412 (Ginzō Nakamori)

2015

- Mobile Suit Gundam: Iron-Blooded Orphans (McMurdo Barriston)
- Ushio & Tora (Kenichi Masaki)
- Chaos Dragon (Kagraba)
- Blood Blockade Battlefront (Patrick)
- Dragon Ball Super (Mr. Satan)
- The Asterisk War (Kouichirou Toudou) (Episode 4-6)
- One-Punch Man (Carnage Kabuto) (Episode 3)
- Pocket Monsters: XY&Z (Dr. Okido, Narrator, Additional Voices)

2016

- Dimension W (Narrator)
- JoJo's Bizarre Adventure: Diamond Is Unbreakable (Joseph Joestar)
- Bakuon!! (Hayakawa) (Episode 2-12)
- Berserk (Narrator)
- Macross Delta (Ernest Johnson)
- Pocket Monsters: Sun & Moon (Dr. Okido, Narrator, Additional Voices)
- Lupin the 3rd Part IV: The Italian Adventure (Salo)

2017

- ACCA: 13-ku Kansatsu-ka (Kuvarum)
- Akashic Records of Bastard Magic Instructor (Burks Blaumohn)
- Zero kara Hajimeru Mahō no Sho (Narrator)
- Akashic Records of Bastard Magic Instructor (Parks Browmon)
- Clockwork Planet (Konrad)

2018

- Banana Fish ("Papa" Dino Golzine)
- Sword Art Online Alternative Gun Gale Online (Narrator)
- Legend of the Galactic Heroes: Die Neue These (Willibald Joachim von Merkatz)
- Jūshinki Pandora (Kane Ibrahim Hasan)

=== Theatrical animation ===
- Legend of the Galactic Heroes: My Conquest is the Sea of Stars (1988) - Job Truniht
- Mobile Suit Gundam: Char's Counterattack (1988) (Meran)
- Legend of the Galactic Heroes: Overture to a New War (1993) - Job Truniht
- Street Fighter II: The Animated Movie (1994) - Blanka
- Macross Plus Movie Edition (1995) - Guld Goa Bowman
- Pokémon: The First Movie (1998) - Narrator / Gyarados / Onix / Kingler (uncredited)
- Case Closed: The Last Wizard of the Century (1999) - Detective Nakamori
- Pokémon: The Movie 2000 (1999) - Dr. Okido
- Pokémon 3: The Movie: Entei – Spell of the Unown (2000) - Dr. Ookido / Onix
- Vampire Hunter D: Bloodlust (2000) - Priest
- Pokémon: Mewtwo Returns (2000) - Gyarados (uncredited)
- Initial D: Third Stage (2001) - Bunta Fujiwara
- Pokémon 4Ever: Celebi – Voice of the Forest (2001) - Professor Orchid (Oak) / Onix
- Cowboy Bebop: The Movie (2001) - Jet Black
- Pokémon Heroes (2002) - Narrator
- A Tree of Palme (2002) - Gaz
- The Place Promised in Our Early Days (2004) - Okabe
- Detective Conan: Magician of the Silver Sky (2004) - Detective Nakamori
- Fullmetal Alchemist the Movie: Conqueror of Shamballa (2005) - Huskisson
- Fist of the North Star: The Legends of the True Savior (2006) - Sôga
- Detective Conan: The Private Eyes' Requiem (2006) - Detective Nakamori
- Pokémon Ranger and the Temple of the Sea (2006) - Narrator
- Shin SOS dai Tôkyô tankentai (2007) - George
- Aquarion Movie: Ippatsu Gyakuten-hen (2007)
- Sword of the Stranger (2007) - Lord Akaike
- Naruto Shippuden the Movie: Bonds (2008) - Shinnô
- Highlander: The Search for Vengeance (2008) - Doc
- Redline (2009) - Colonel Volton
- Time of Eve (2010) - Katoran
- Detective Conan: The Lost Ship in the Sky (2010) - Detective Nakamori
- Pokémon—Zoroark: Master of Illusions (2010) - Narrator
- Pokémon the Movie: Black—Victini and Reshiram and White—Victini and Zekrom (2011) - Narrator
- Tekken: Blood Vengeance (2011) - Heihachi Mishima
- One Piece Film: Z (2012) - Kizaru
- Dragon Ball Z: Battle of Gods (2013) - Mr. Satan
- Lupin the 3rd vs. Detective Conan: The Movie (2013) - Detective Nakamori
- Psycho-Pass: The Movie (2015) - Desmond Rutaganda
- Attack on Titan – Part 2: Wings of Freedom (2015) - Annie's Father
- Pokémon the Movie: Hoopa and the Clash of Ages (2015) - Narrator
- Detective Conan: Sunflowers of Inferno (2015) - Detective Nakamori
- Pop in Q (2016) - Elder
- Pokémon the Movie: Volcanion and the Mechanical Marvel (2016) - Narrator
- Pokémon the Movie: I Choose You! (2017) - Narrator / Professor Okido
- Mazinger Z: Infinity (2017) - Dr. Hell
- Gekijoban Haikara-san ga Toru Zenpen: Benio, Hana no 17-sai (2017) - Major Hanamura
- Yo-kai Watch Shadowside: Oni-ō no Fukkatsu (2017) - Demon King Rasen
- Pokémon the Movie: The Power of Us (2018) - Narrator
- Gekijoban Haikara-san ga Toru Zenpen: Tokyo Dai Roman (2018) - Major Hanamura
- Mewtwo Strikes Back: Evolution (2019) - Narrator
- My Tyrano: Together, Forever (2021)

=== Original video animation (OVA) ===
- Legend of the Galactic Heroes (1988) (Job Trunicht)
- Violence Jack: Hell's Wind (1990) (Violence Jack)
- Vampire Hunter: The Animated Series (1997–1998) (Donovan Baine)
- Hellsing Ultimate (2007) (Spirit of Hallconnen) (Ep. 3)
- Mobile Suit Gundam Unicorn (2010–2014) (Meran, Yonem Kirks)
- Deadman Wonderland OVA (2011) (Domon)
- Attack on Titan - Lost Girls: Wall Sina, Goodbye Part. B (2018) (Mr. Leonhart)

=== Web animation ===
- Xam'd: Lost Memories (2008-2009) (Ryūzō Takehara)

=== Video games ===
Year	Title	Role	Notes	Source
1998	Dragon Force II	Grandel		
2000	Breath of Fire IV	Scias		
2002	Xenosaga Episode I: Der Wille zur Macht	Captain Matthews		
2002	Breath of Fire: Dragon Quarter	Odjn		
2002	Panzer Dragoon Orta	Sestren		
2003	Star Ocean: Till the End of Time	Adray Lasbard		
2003	Kunoichi	Kazaguruma		
2004	Xenosaga Episode II: Jenseits von Gut und Böse	Captain Matthews		
2005	Romancing SaGa	Hawke		
2006	Xenosaga Episode III: Also sprach Zarathustra	Captain Matthews		
2008	Persona 4	Ryotaro Dojima	Also Golden in 2012	
2009	Yakuza 3	Tetsuo Tamashiro		
2010	Kingdom Hearts Birth by Sleep	Captain Gantu		
2010	Zangeki no Reginleiv	Gunther		
2010	Kurohyō: Ryū ga Gotoku Shinshō	Shozo Takenaka		
2011	Tekken Tag Tournament 2	Heihachi Mishima		
2012	Street Fighter X Tekken	Heihachi Mishima		
2012	Dead or Alive 5	Brad Wong		
2012	Project X Zone	Heihachi Mishima		
2014	Ryū ga Gotoku Ishin!	Toyo Yoshida		
2015	Tekken 7	Heihachi Mishima		
2015	7th Dragon III: Code VFD	Yoritomo		
2015	Project X Zone 2	Heihachi Mishima		
2015	JoJo's Bizarre Adventure: Eyes of Heaven	Joseph Joestar (old)		
2017	Shin Megami Tensei: Strange Journey	Commander Gore	credited as Unsyo Ishizuki	
2018	Super Smash Bros. Ultimate	Incineroar (Gaogaen in Japan), various Poké Ball Pokémon, Heihachi Mishima.	Posthumous release	
2018	God Eater 3	Abraham Gadolin	Posthumous release	
2019	Dead or Alive 6	Brad Wong	Posthumous release	
2019	One Piece: World Seeker	Kizaru	Posthumous release	
2019	Super Robot Wars T	Meran, Jet Black	Posthumous release	
2019	The King of Fighters All Star	Heihachi Mishima	Posthumous release	
2022	JoJo's Bizarre Adventure: All Star Battle R	Joseph Joestar (old)	Posthumous release	
2023	Like a Dragon: Ishin!	Toyo Yoshida	Posthumous release	

- Tales of Phantasia (1995) (Trinicus Morrison, Edward Morrison)
- Pokémon Snap (1999) (Doctor Ōkido)
- Vampire Hunter D (1999) (Narrator)
- Macross VF-X2 (1999) (Gilliam Angreat)
- Capcom vs. SNK: Millennium Fight 2000 (2000) (Guile)
- Capcom vs. SNK 2: Millionaire Fighting 2001 (2001) (Guile)
- Initial D Arcade Stage (2002–2014) (Bunta Fujiwara)
- Naruto: Ultimate Ninja series (Zabuza Momochi)
- Naruto: Clash of Ninja series (Zabuza Momochi)
- Capcom Fighting Jam (2004) (Guile)
- Tales of Rebirth (2004) (Eugene Gallardo)
- Radiata Stories (2005) (Gerald)
- Cowboy Bebop: Tsuioku no Serenade (2005) (Jet Black)
- Critical Velocity (2005) (Hartman)
- Rogue Galaxy (2005) (Deego Aegis)
- Ace Combat 6: Fires of Liberation (2007) (Victor Voychek)
- Too Human (2008) (ODIN, Loki) (Japanese dub)
- One Piece: Unlimited Cruise Episode 2: Awakening of a Hero (2009) (Kizaru)
- Resistance: Retribution (2009) (Steven Cartwright) (Japanese dub)
- Samurai Warriors 3 (2009) (Ujiyasu Hōjō)
- The Legend of Heroes: Trails from Zero (2010) (Sergei Lou)
- Chaos Rings (2010) (Olgar)
- God of War: Ghost of Sparta (2010) (Thanatos) (Japanese dub)
- Dance Dance Revolution series (2010–2016) (Afro)
- Samurai Warriors: Chronicles (2011) (Ujiyasu Hōjō)
- The Last Story (2011) (Quark)
- 2nd Super Robot Wars Z (2011) (Sergei Smirnov)
- Dead or Alive: Dimensions (2011) (Brad Wong)
- Nora to Toki no Kōbō: Kiri no Mori no Majo (2011) (Octoja Rejstrom)
- Code 18 (2011) (Genkuro Kanbara)
- Dragon Ball Z: Ultimate Tenkaichi (2011) (Mr. Satan)
- Call of Duty: Modern Warfare 3 (2011) (Captain Price) (Japanese dub)
- Musō Orochi 2 (2011) (Ujiyasu Hōjō)
- Tekken 3D: Prime Edition (2012) (Heihachi Mishima)
- Asura's Wrath (2012) (Augus)
- PlayStation All-Stars Battle Royale (2012) (Heihachi Mishima, Andrew Ryan) (Japanese dub)
- Fist of the North Star: Ken's Rage 2 (2012) (Kaioh)
- Metal Gear Rising: Revengeance (2013) (Steven Armstrong) (Japanese dub)
- Super Robot Wars UX (2013) (Gogorr)
- Tekken Revolution (2013) (Heihachi Mishima)
- Dragon's Crown (2013) (Dwarf)
- Samurai Warriors 4 (2014) (Ujiyasu Hōjō)
- Ryū ga Gotoku Ishin! (2014) (Yoshida Tōyō)
- Granblue Fantasy (2014) (Agielba)
- J-Stars Victory Vs (2014) (Heihachi Edajima)
- Dragon Ball Xenoverse (2015) (Mr. Satan)
- Devil's Third (2015) (Ivan)
- Dragon Ball Xenoverse 2 (2016) (Mr. Satan)
- Tokyo Afterschool Summoners (2017) (Captain Ahab)
- The Elder Scrolls Online (2018) (Ritemaster Iachesis)
- Dragalia Lost (2018) (Kleimann, Zacharias, The Doctor)

=== CD dramas ===
- GetBackers (2003) (Lucifer)

=== Tokusatsu ===
- Choushinsei Flashman (1986-1987) - Great Emperor Ra Deus (Ep 1 - 49)
- Kyukyu Sentai GoGo Five (1999) - Corrosion Psyma Beast Jeruda (Ep 6)
- Ultraman Zero Side Story: Killer the Beatstar (2011) - Beatstar
- Ressha Sentai ToQger (2014) - Table Shadow (Ep 31-32)
- Doubutsu Sentai Zyuohger (2016-2017) - Larry (Ep 5 - 6, 26, 37 - 38, 44 - 48)

=== Dubbing roles ===
==== Live-action ====
- Liam Neeson
  - Taken – Bryan Mills
  - Unknown – Dr. Martin Harris
  - Battleship – Admiral Terrance Shane
  - Taken 2 – Bryan Mills
  - A Million Ways to Die in the West – Clinch Leatherwood
  - Non-Stop – William "Bill" Marks
  - A Walk Among the Tombstones – Matthew Scudder
  - Run All Night – Jimmy Conlon
  - Taken 3 – Bryan Mills
  - Ted 2 – Customer
  - The Huntsman: Winter's War – Narrator
  - A Monster Calls – The Monster / Conor's Grandfather
  - Operation Chromite – General Douglas MacArthur
- Kevin Spacey
  - Consenting Adults – Eddy Otis
  - K-PAX – prot/Robert Porter
  - Superman Returns – Lex Luthor
  - Fred Claus – Clyde Archibald Northcutt
  - Moon – GERTY
  - House of Cards – Frank Underwood
  - Baby Driver – Doc
- Laurence Fishburne
  - Just Cause (1997 TV Tokyo edition) – Sheriff Tanny Brown
  - Mystic River – Detective Sergeant Whitey Powers
  - Mission: Impossible III – Theodore Brassel
  - The Death and Life of Bobby Z – Tad Gruzsa
  - Man of Steel – Perry White
  - Ride Along – Omar
  - Batman v Superman: Dawn of Justice – Perry White
- The 100 – Thelonious Jaha (Isaiah Washington)
- All About Eve (2000 TV Tokyo edition) – Addison DeWitt (George Sanders)
- American Outlaws – Allan Pinkerton (Timothy Dalton)
- Arachnophobia – Dr. James Atherton (Julian Sands)
- Cast Away – Stan (Nick Searcy)
- City of Angels – Cassiel (Andre Braugher)
- The Company You Keep – Jim Grant / Nick Sloan (Robert Redford)
- Conspiracy Theory – Agent Lowry (Cylk Cozart)
- Crank – Doc Miles (Dwight Yoakam)
- Crank: High Voltage – Doc Miles (Dwight Yoakam)
- Crimson Tide (2000 TV Asahi edition) – Lieutenant Bobby Dougherty (James Gandolfini)
- The Crow (1997 TV Tokyo edition) – Grange (Tony Todd)
- Day Watch – Zavulon (Viktor Verzhbitsky)
- The Detonator (2009 TV Tokyo edition) – Jozef Bostanescu (Tim Dutton)
- Die Hard with a Vengeance – NYPD Detective Joe Lambert (Graham Greene)
- Dom Hemingway – Mr. Fontaine (Demián Bichir)
- Dr. Dolittle – Dr. Gene Reiss (Richard Schiff)
- Fire Down Below (2000 TV Asahi edition) – Earl Kellogg (Stephen Lang)
- From the Earth to the Moon – William Anders (Robert John Burke)
- Funny Face (2001 DVD edition) – Professor Emile Flostre (Michel Auclair)
- Galaxy Quest – Alexander Dane (Alan Rickman)
- Ghostbusters – Mayor Bradley (Andy García)
- Gone Girl – Tanner Bolt (Tyler Perry)
- The Green Mile – Brutus "Brutal" Howell (David Morse)
- Hackers – The Plague / Eugene Belford (Fisher Stevens)
- High Fidelity – Ian Raymond (Tim Robbins)
- Hot Shots! Part Deux – Dexter Hayman (Rowan Atkinson)
- The Horse Whisperer – Robert MacLean (Sam Neill)
- In the Name of the King – Norick (Ron Perlman)
- Internal Affairs – Sergeant Raymond Avilla (Andy García)
- Jennifer 8 – Sgt. John Berlin (Andy García)
- Journey to the End of the Night – Sinatra (Scott Glenn)
- Judge Dredd – Rico Dredd (Armand Assante)
- Land of the Lost – Enik (John Boylan)
- Lara Croft: Tomb Raider – The Cradle of Life – Jonathan Reiss (Ciarán Hinds)
- Leap of Faith – Jonas Nightengale (Steve Martin)
- Licence to Kill (1999 TV Asahi edition) – Professor Joe Butcher (Wayne Newton)
- A Little Chaos – Louis XIV (Alan Rickman)
- Man on a Ledge – Jackie "Jack" Dougherty (Edward Burns)
- The Matrix Reloaded – Commander Lock (Harry Lennix)
- The Matrix Revolutions – Commander Lock (Harry Lennix)
- Moonraker – Hugo Drax (Michael Lonsdale)
- Near Dark – Severen (Bill Paxton)
- Night Watch – Zavulon (Viktor Verzhbitsky)
- Nineteen Eighty-Four – Big Brother
- Nixon – Alexander Haig (Powers Boothe)
- The Order – Driscoll (Peter Weller)
- Payback – Val Resnick (Gregg Henry)
- Penny Dreadful – Malcolm Murray (Timothy Dalton)
- Percy Jackson: Sea of Monsters – Kronos (Robert Knepper)
- The Poseidon Adventure (2016 BS-TBS edition) – The Reverend Frank Scott (Gene Hackman)
- Prince of Persia: The Sands of Time – Sheik Amar (Alfred Molina)
- Scarface (2004 DVD edition) – Alejandro Sosa (Paul Shenar)
- She-Wolf of London – Fergus (John Hallam)
- The Sorcerer's Apprentice – Maxim Horvath (Alfred Molina)
- Speed 2: Cruise Control – Juliano (Temuera Morrison)
- The Taking of Pelham 123 – Walter Garber (Denzel Washington)
- Taxi – Daniel Morales (Samy Naceri)
- The Thieves – Chen (Simon Yam)
- The Thin Red Line – Capt. Charles Bosche (George Clooney)
- Titanic – Brock Lovett (Bill Paxton)
- Tootsie (25th Anniversary DVD edition) – Ron Carlisle (Dabney Coleman)
- The Vow – Bill Thornton (Sam Neill)
- The West Wing – Josh Lyman (Bradley Whitford)
- Whiskey Tango Foxtrot – Ali Massoud Sadiq (Alfred Molina)
- X-Men Origins: Wolverine – Victor Creed (Liev Schreiber)

==== Animation ====
- Batman: The Animated Series (H.A.R.D.A.C.) (1st Time)
- Beware the Batman (Tobias Whale)
- Chicken Little (Mr. Woolensworth)
- Cloudy with a Chance of Meatballs (Mayor Shelbourne)
- Ice Age: The Meltdown (Lone Gunslinger Vulture)
- Ice Age: A Mammoth Christmas (Diego)
- Ice Age: Continental Drift (Diego)
- Ice Age: Collision Course (Diego)
- Isle of Dogs (Narrator)
- Lilo & Stitch (Captain Gantu)
- Lilo & Stitch: The Series (Captain Gantu)
- Leroy & Stitch (Captain Gantu)
- Mr. Bogus (Additional Voices)
- Shrek 2 (Prince Charming)
- Shrek the Third (Prince Charming)
- Sing (Big Daddy)
- Stitch! The Movie (Captain Gantu)
- SWAT Kats: The Radical Squadron (Jonny K.)
- Thunderbirds Are Go (The Hood)
- Transformers: Prime (Leland "Silas" Bishop)
- Widget (Bob and Additional Voices)
- Wreck-It Ralph (General Hologram)
