= Rodger Parsons =

American voice actor

- Born: Stonington, Connecticut, U.S.
- Other names: Ken Gates
- Occupation: Voice actor
- Years active: 1971–present

Rodger Parsons previously credited as Ken Gates, is an American voice actor, narrator and writer. He is best known as the English narrator for the Pokémon television series.

== Filmography ==
=== Feature film and TV credits ===
- New York, feature – Yash Raj Films, Gibson
- Betrayed, feature – telephone caller
- New Year's Day, feature – the Boss
- You've Got to Walk It, feature – character narrator
- Pokémon, TV show – Narrator (4Kids dub Season 1–6; Pokémon USA/The Pokémon Company International dub Season 9–25)
- Pokémon, Movies - Narrator (4Kids dub Movies 1–5, Pokémon USA/The Pokémon Company International dub Movie 9–23, and Pokémon: Mewtwo Returns)

=== Documentary film credits ===
- Native Americans in the Civil War, History Channel – narrator
- The Hermitage, 18-part series – NET – narrator
- Water, NET – narrator
- Flight Deck, Military Channel – narrator
- Vertical Flight, Military Channel – narrator
- Pulitzer, NET – character voice
- The United States Pharmacopeia – narrator
- Air Force Office of Scientific Research – Narrator
- History of Nazism, 2-part series – writer/narrator
- Story of Fascism, 5-part series – writer/narrator
- In the Deep – writer/narrator
- All in a Day's Work – narrator
- John Paul — The People's Pope – narrator
- Mandela – narrator

=== Feature film looping credits ===
- Across the Universe – newscaster voice
- Michael – featured voice
- Someone to Watch Over Me
- Sleepless in Seattle
- The Bonfire of the Vanities
- Billy Bathgate

=== Video game credits ===
- Dissidia Final Fantasy – Cid of the Lufaine
- Dissidia 012 Final Fantasy – Cid of the Lufaine
- Mood Shifters – Narrator
- Like It or Not – Narrator
- Once on a Wink – Narrator
- Pokémon Battle Revolution – Narrator
- PokéROM – narrator
- I Spy Treasure Hunt – Voice of Pirate
- Bullet Witch – Voice of Darkness

=== Notable voice roles ===
- Narrator of the English version of the Pokemon TV show and Pokémon Battle Revolution

=== Software ===
- IVONA Eric Voice Model
