= Deno =

Deno may refer to:

== People ==
=== Given name ===
- Deno (singer) (born 2002), English singer and actor
- Deno Andrews (born 1971), American billiards player
- Deno Curris (born 1940), American academic administrator
- Deno Davie (born 1965), English cyclist
- Deno Geanakoplos (1916–2007), American historian

=== Surname ===
- Dave Deno (born 1956 or 1957), American businessman
- Francisco Alberto Caamaño Deñó (1932–1973), Dominican soldier and politician
- Harunobu Deno (born 1969), Japanese fencer
- Lottie Deno (1844–1934), American gambler
- Norman C. Deno (1921–2017), American chemist and plant scientist
- Stan Deno (born 2016), American psychologist

== Other uses ==
- Deno (Rila), a peak in the eastern part of the Rila Mountain, Bulgaria
- Deno (software), a JavaScript/TypeScript runtime
- Deno language, spoken in Nigeria
- Deno's Wonder Wheel Amusement Park, Coney Island, US

== See also ==
- Denno (disambiguation)
- Dino (disambiguation)
- Dyno (disambiguation)
- Dano (disambiguation)
- Deino (mythology)
- Deino (Pokémon)
