= Dino =

Dino may refer to:

== People and fictional characters ==
- Dino (given name), a masculine given name and a nickname, including a list of people and fictional characters
- Dino (surname), a surname in Albania and Turkey
- Diño, a surname in the Philippines
- Dino, given first name and nickname for American singer, actor, comedian and television host Dean Martin
- Dino (American singer), American singer-songwriter Dean Esposito (born 1963)
- Dino (Italian singer), Eugenio Zambelli (born 1948)
- Dino (South Korean singer), South Korean singer, dancer and rapper Lee Chan (born 1999)
- Dîno, Kurdish singer-songwriter
- Dino (footballer, born 1917), Brazilian football midfielder Oswaldo Rodolfo da Silva (1917–1987)
- Dino (footballer, born 1978), Brazilian football defender Dino Gonçalo Castro Jorge
- Danshoku Dino, ring name of Japanese professional wrestler Akiru Miyashita
- Dino, real name Gilles Benizio, of the French comic duo Shirley and Dino

== Arts and entertainment ==
- Dino (The Flintstones), cartoon pet dinosaur of animated TV series The Flintstones, voiced by Mel Blanc
- Dino (film), a 1957 film
- Dino: Italian Love Songs, a 1962 album by Dean Martin
- Dino (album), a 1972 studio album by Dean Martin
- Dino (Jessica Folcker album), a studio album by Swedish singer Jessica Folcker
- Dino: The Essential Dean Martin, a 2004 compilation album
- Dino (biography), a 1992 biography of Dean Martin by Nick Tosches

== Businesses ==
- Dino Entertainment, a firm specializing in the compilation market of the late 1980s and early 1990s
- Dino (Polish supermarket), a Polish retail grocery chain

== Transportation ==
- Ferrari Dino engine
  - Dino (automobile), a Ferrari model
  - Fiat Dino, a car that used Dino Ferrari's V6 engine
- Ganzavia GAK-22 Dinó, a light utility aircraft

== Other uses ==
- Dino, Switzerland, a village in the canton of Ticino
- Democrat in Name Only (DINO), a derogatory political term
- Lego Dino, a Lego theme
- Dino, an open source XMPP client software
- self-distillation with no labels (DINO), a variant of the AI model vision transformer
- Dinosaur

== See also ==
- "Dino vs. Dino", debut single by Brazilian rock band Far from Alaska
- Al' Dino (Aldin Kurić, born 1970), Bosnian singer, songwriter and composer
- Dinos (disambiguation)
- Dyno (disambiguation)
- Deno (disambiguation)
- Deino (mythology)
