= Danno =

Danno may refer to:

- Stefan Dannö (born 1969), Swedish Speedway racer
- Danno O'Mahony (1912-1950), Irish professional wrestler
- Dan O'Keeffe (1907-1967), Irish Gaelic football goalkeeper nicknamed "Danno"
- Danny "Danno" Williams, a fictional character from the Hawaii Five-O television series, whence the catchphrase "Book 'em, Danno!"

== See also ==
- Denno (disambiguation)
- Dano (disambiguation)
