= Pokémon—Zoroark: Master of Illusions =

2010 film by Kunihiko Yuyama

- Theatrical release poster

Japanese name
- Kanji: 劇場版ポケットモンスター ダイヤモンド&パール 幻影の覇者 ゾロアーク
- Literal meaning: Pocket Monsters Diamond & Pearl the Movie: Phantom Ruler ー Zoroark
Transcriptions
- Revised Hepburn: Gekijō-ban Pokettomonsutā Daiyamondo ando Pāru Gen'ei no Hasha Zoroāku
- Directed by: Kunihiko Yuyama
- Screenplay by: Hideki Sonoda
- Based on: Pokémon by Satoshi Tajiri
- Produced by: Takemoto Mori; Choji Yoshikawa; Yukio Kawasaki; Junya Okamoto; Susumu Fukunaga
- Starring: see below
- Cinematography: Takaya Mizutani
- Edited by: Toshio Henmi
- Music by: Shinji Miyazaki
- Production company: OLM, Inc.
- Distributed by: Toho
- Release date: July 10, 2010 (Japan)
- Running time: 95 minutes
- Country: Japan
- Language: Japanese
- Box office: $71.1 million

Pokémon—Zoroark: Master of Illusions (Note: Japanese: 劇場版ポケットモンスター ダイヤモンド&パール 幻影の覇者 ゾロアーク, Hepburn: Gekijō-ban Pokettomonsutā Daiyamondo ando Pāru Gen'ei no Hasha Zoroāku; lit. "Pocket Monsters Diamond & Pearl the Movie: Phantom Ruler: Zoroark") is a 2010 Japanese animated adventure fantasy film directed by Kunihiko Yuyama. It is the thirteenth film of the Pokémon anime series and the fourth and final film of Pokémon the Series: Diamond and Pearl.

In the film, the businessman and media owner Grings Kodai plans to absorb the "Time Ripple" that appear in Crown City to renew his ability to see into the future, which will destroy the city's greenery. To help find the ripple, Kodai manipulate the news to have the city sealed off by using illusions created by Zoroark, a creature known as a Pokémon. Meanwhile, the Pokémon trainers Ash Ketchum, Dawn, and Brock accompany a Zorua to reunite it with its caretaker Zoroark.

The film was released in Japan on July 10, 2010, by Toho. The English-language dub of the film premiered in the United States on Cartoon Network on February 5, 2011. The film was shown at US theaters during the Pokémon Black and White Tour in the United States.

== Plot ==
=== Setting ===
The film's fictitious setting is based on various locations in the Netherlands, the Netherlands Public Broadcasting's country, and Belgium. Among the locations Yuyama and his staff visited and have been used as inspiration for the movie were the Magere Brug, Amstel River, Kinderdijk, and Brussels, the city of Vlaamse Radio- en Televisieomroeporganisatie and Radio-Télévision belge de la Communauté française.

=== Story ===
Crown City once existed in perfect harmony with the forest. Twenty years ago, a man named Grings Kodai absorbed the Time Ripple, created by the time-travelling Pokémon visiting the city, Celebi, to gain the power to see into the future. This caused nearly all of the city's greenery to die. With his power, Kodai became a successful businessman and controlled the mainstream media. Over time, the people and Pokémon worked together to bring the city back to life.

In the present, when his visions begin to fail, Kodai plans to absorb the power of the ripple, once again destroying the city's greenery, before the ripple disappears. He captures the Pokémon Zoroark and the Zorua she takes care of, and transports them across the sea on Kodai's aircraft headed to Crown City; Zorua uses its illusion powers to escape. Pokémon trainers Ash Ketchum, Dawn, and Brock find Zorua in the forest outside the city and accompany him to Crown City to reunite him with Zoroark.

Kodai unleashes the imprisoned Zoroark upon the city, showing her a video pretending to hold Zorua as a hostage. Zoroark uses her illusion powers to take the form of the Legendary Pokémon Entei, Raikou, and Suicune, the guardian protectors of the city in ancient times, scaring the townsfolk. Kodai and his secretary Rowena manipulate the footage to fabricate news that Zoroark is evil and causing the guardian protectors to rampage, and orders the city to be sealed off while he searches for the Time Ripple in secret. Ash, Dawn, Brock, and Zorua meet Karl, a local journalist investigating Kodai. Karl leads them into the sealed-off part of the city through a sewer. Kodai has his henchman, Goone, recapture Zoroark, and has a vision that Ash, Dawn, Brock, Karl, and Rowena will stop him.

Zorua, followed by Ash's Pikachu and Dawn's Piplup, runs off to find Zoroark, but Celebi appears and befriends Zorua, Pikachu, and Piplup. Kodai captures and imprisons Ash, Dawn, Brock, and Karl. Rowena, revealed to be an undercover journalist investigating Kodai, releases them. Kodai has a vision that Celebi will show him the Time Ripple, and he targets it. Kodai harms Celebi, seeing more of the future. Ash, Dawn, Brock, Karl, and Rowena flee with Zorua and Celebi, meeting up with Karl's grandfather Joe and his friend Tammy. Joe reveals that the Time Ripple is near a countdown clock in the local stadium; Kodai eavesdrops on the conversation.

Meanwhile, Zoroark escapes the cage that Kodai's henchman captured her in. The real guardian protectors arrive to fight Zoroark, believing it is attacking the city. Karl, Rowena, Joe, and Tammy stop the fighting between Zoroark and the guardian protectors.

Ash carries an injured Celebi to the Time Ripple at the stadium, followed by Kodai. Kodai's Mismagius traps Ash and Celebi with telepathy, and his Shuppet injures Zoroark, preventing them from reaching the Time Ripple. Kodai believes he has absorbed part of the Time Ripple and replenished his power, confessing that he has fooled the townsfolk twice with his media manipulations. However, Zoroark soon reveals Kodai's victory is an illusion created by herself. Kodai tries to reach the Time Ripple but is blocked by the guardian protectors, and Zoroark traps him in the stadium by using its remaining strength to make an illusion of Kodai's ship.

Zoroark collapses from its injuries. Celebi ventures into the Time Ripple to rejuvenate its own power and revive Zoroark, before departing back to the future. Kodai's confessions are played on television news all over the world, and he is promptly arrested with Goone, much to his fury. Zorua and Zoroark depart for their home region, Unova, with Ash promising that he will visit there next.

== Cast ==
=== Regular characters ===
Character	Japanese	English
Ash	Rica Matsumoto	Sarah Natochenny
Pikachu	Ikue Ōtani	Ikue Ōtani
Brock	Yūji Ueda	Bill Rogers
Dawn	Megumi Toyoguchi	Emily Jenness
Piplup	Etsuko Kozakura	Michele Knotz
Narrator	Unshō Ishizuka	Rodger Parsons

=== Guest characters ===
- Grings Kodai (グリングス・コーダイ, Guringusu Kōdai), voiced by Takanori Jinnai in Japanese and Sean Schemmel in English: The main antagonist of the movie who is a wealthy businessman with the power to see the future, which he obtained by stealing the energy from Celebi's Time Ripple twenty years prior to the movie. Despite pretending to care for Crown City, Kodai is in fact a psychopathic and sadistic man who cares little for Crown City and its people. At the end of the film, he is arrested, but in the manga, Zoroark chases him to the top floors of the Stadium, summoning illusionary vines in front of him, then he trips and plummets to his death. Unlike other Pokémon villains, he was discovered to be shockingly evil, going as far as strangling Celebi, electrocuting Zorua then saying he got a kick out of it, trying to kill Ash and his friends, and nearly murdering Zoroark.
- Goone (グーン, Gūn), voiced by Kōichi Yamadera in Japanese and Marc Thompson in English: Kodai's bodyguard. Arrested with Kodai at the end of the film.
- Karl (クルト, Kuruto), voiced by Takashi Tsukamoto in Japanese and Wayne Grayson in English: A newspaper reporter from Crown City who is investigating Kodai's secrets.
- Rowena (リオカ, Rioka), voiced by Natsuki Katō in Japanese and Bella Hudson in English: A cool and intelligent young woman who initially appears to be Kodai's secretary, but is actually an undercover reporter working with Karl.
- Peg (プルーフ, Purūfu; Proof), voiced by Shoko Nakagawa in Japanese and Alyson Leigh Rosenfeld in English: A purple-haired girl who's an ardent supporter of the Crown City Coronets. She finds herself thrown into the chaos in the destruction of the city. At the end of the film, Peg watches Kodai's boasting confession on a television screen in the city and calls him "a terrible man".
- Zoroark, voiced by Romi Park: A Dark-type Pokémon abducted by Kodai. She rampages through Crown City in the guises of Raikou, Entei and Suicune due to Kodai blackmailing her with her son, Zorua's, safety. Near the end of the film, Zoroark helps Celebi stop Kodai and protect the time ripple by casting one of her illusions on him, which tricks him into thinking he's already captured the time ripple's power for himself. When Zoroark collapses from exhaustion after helping Celebi and the protagonists to stop Kodai and protect her son and the time ripple, Celebi repays Zoroark by restoring her energy with time ripple, reviving her.
- Zorua, voiced by Kurumi Mamiya in Japanese and Eileen Stevens in English: A Pokémon related to Zoroark that can use weaker illusion powers. He is desperate to reunite with his mother, the film's Zoroark, whom he refers to as "Meema". In middle of the film, Zorua befriends Celebi and accepts its help in looking for Zoroark. Zorua, afterward, makes an effort to help protect Celebi and the time ripple and stop Kodai.
- Celebi, voiced by Rie Kugimiya: A Mythical Pokémon that travels through time to visit Crown City. The last time it appeared prior to the movie was twenty years ago, when it was attacked by Kodai and his Shuppet, who was after the Time Ripple. In the present day, Celebi and its time ripple are once again targeted by Kodai. In middle of the film, Celebi befriends Zorua and helps him look for Zoroark. Celebi also has the power to make flowers magically bloom as well as turn the flowers into edible, fully ripened fruit.
- The Legendary Beasts (Raikou, Entei and Suicune), A trio of Shiny Legendary Pokémon are the protectors of Crown City. They appeared when they believed that Zoroark was terrorizing the town. When they came to Crown City, they attacked Zoroark, and chased it down in the process. When they cornered Zoroark, the Pokémon living in Crown City all surrounded them and the Legendary beasts then stopped attacking Zoroark after learning that it had no malevolent intentions. Later, when Grings Kodai, on the verge of his defeat, tried to reach the Time Ripple a final time, Raikou, Entei, and Suicune cornered Kodai, causing him to flee to the stadium, where he was knocked unconscious by Zoroark. The three then roared their farewells to Zoroark when it and Zorua left to return to Unova. Raikou is voiced by Katsuyuki Konishi, Entei is voiced by Kenta Miyake and Suicune is voiced by Kiyotaka Furushima, respectively.

== Critical reception ==
Jeffery Anderson of Common Sense Media gave it a positive review and said that "Pokemon: Zoroark and the Master of Illusions is a cut above the rest, using gorgeous computer-rendered backdrops, as well as some surprisingly majestic and lovely moments" and "Unfortunately, it's also a bit more violent than we usually get from this series."

== Promotions ==
As a promotion for this movie, in Japan everyone who pre-ordered their tickets to the movie got to download a special alternate-colored version of Raikou, Entei, and Suicune, which, when traded over to the Pokémon Black and White games activated an in game encounter with a special Zoroark that uses its Illusion ability to transform into the legendary Pokémon with a type advantage to the transferred one. In addition, people who attended a theatrical presentation of the film in Japan were able to download a special Celebi to their video game, which when transferred to Black or White activates an encounter with a special Zorua. In North America, this promotion was being implemented through GameStop stores, with each Pokémon given a staggered release. In Europe and North America, the "Crown Beasts" were downloadable over Nintendo Wi-Fi Connection also in a staggered set of releases. In Norway, the event Celebi was downloadable to copies of Pokémon Diamond, Pearl, Platinum, HeartGold, or SoulSilver at Spaceworld stores starting on February 14, 2011. Celebi was made available in the US during the Pokémon Black Version & White Version Tour when it began on February 5, 2011, and US Gamestop stores from February 21, 2011, to March 6, 2011.

The second promotion, which was for the US release of the DVD, an exclusive download of Zoroark was made available at US Toys "R" Us stores from September 18, 2011, to September 25, 2011, to the players' version of Pokémon Black and White. A sweepstakes also took place on the official Pokémon website as a promotion for the movie.
