= Pokémon Black and White =

2010 video games

Pokémon Black; Pokémon White
- North American box art for Pokémon Black and Pokémon White, depicting the legendary Pokémon Reshiram and Zekrom respectively
- Developer: Game Freak
- Publishers: JP: The Pokémon Company; WW: Nintendo
- Director: Junichi Masuda
- Producers: Junichi Masuda; Hitoshi Yamagami; Shusaku Egami; Hiroaki Tsuru
- Designers: Shigeki Morimoto; Shigeru Ohmori
- Programmer: Tetsuya Watanabe
- Artists: Ken Sugimori; Takao Unno
- Writer: Toshinobu Matsumiya
- Composers: Shota Kageyama; Go Ichinose; Hitomi Sato; Junichi Masuda; Minako Adachi
- Series: Pokémon
- Platform: Nintendo DS
- Release: JP: 18 September 2010; EU: 4 March 2011; NA: 6 March 2011; AU: 10 March 2011
- Genre: Role-playing
- Modes: Single-player, multiplayer

Pokémon Black Version (Note: Japanese: ポケットモンスター ブラック, Hepburn: Poketto Monsutā Burakku; "Pocket Monsters: Black") and Pokémon White Version (Note: Japanese: ポケットモンスター ホワイト, Hepburn: Poketto Monsutā Howaito; "Pocket Monsters: White") are 2010 role-playing video games developed by Game Freak and published by The Pokémon Company and Nintendo for the Nintendo DS. They are the first installments in the fifth generation of the Pokémon video game series. First released in Japan on 18 September 2010, they were later released in Europe, North America and Australia in March 2011. Sequels to Black and White, Pokémon Black 2 and Pokémon White 2, were released for the Nintendo DS in 2012.

Similar to previous installments of the series, the two games follow the journey of a young Pokémon Trainer through the region of Unova, as they train Pokémon used to compete against other Trainers while thwarting the schemes of the criminal organization Team Plasma. Black and White introduced 156 new Pokémon to the franchise, 5 more than the previous record holder Pokémon Red and Blue, as well as many new features, including a seasonal cycle, rotation battles, triple battles, hidden abilities, and fully animated Pokémon sprites. Both titles are independent of each other but feature largely the same plot, and while both can be played separately, trading Pokémon between both of the games is necessary in order to complete the games' Pokédex.

Upon their release, Black and White received positive reviews, with praise for the advancements in gameplay. Reviewers, however, were divided on some of the Pokémon designs, and some critics felt that the games did not innovate as much as expected. Nevertheless, the games were commercial successes; prior to the games' Japanese release, Black and White sold 1 million consumer pre-orders and became the fastest Nintendo DS titles to sell 5 million copies. As of September 2017, the games' combined sales have reached 15.64 million, putting them amongst the best-selling games for the Nintendo DS, just behind their predecessors, Pokémon Diamond and Pearl.

== Gameplay ==
Pokémon Black and White are role-playing video games with adventure elements, presented in a third-person, overhead perspective. There are three basic screens: an overworld, in which the player navigates the main character; a battle screen; and the menu, in which the player configures their party, items, or gameplay settings. The player controls a Pokémon Trainer who begins the game with a single Pokémon and is able to capture more using Poké Balls. Like all other Trainers, the player can carry up to six Pokémon at one time. However, the game also includes a network of PCs to store hundreds of Pokémon. PCs are found in certain buildings called Pokémon Centers, where the player can heal their Pokémon when they have low health or have fainted.

Pokémon can learn up to four moves, including attacking moves, healing moves, and moves that inflict status conditions on the opponent. They have six stats that affect battle performance: maximum hit points (HP), Attack, Defense, Special Attack, Special Defense, and Speed. Attack and Special Attack are distinguished from Defense and Special Defense by the types of moves being considered: generally, moves involving physical exertion are physical, while moves involving supernatural or elemental powers are special. Moves are classed as one of seventeen types: Normal, Water, Grass, Fire, Electric, Ghost, Bug, Fighting, Ice, Steel, Rock, Poison, Psychic, Dark, Dragon, Ground, and Flying; Pokémon can have one or two types. Generally, most of a Pokémon's moves correspond to its typing. A Pokémon's type makes it vulnerable or resistant to others; for example, Fire-type Pokémon are weak to Water-type moves, while Grass-type moves do little damage to them and Electric-type moves do normal damage.

When the player encounters a wild Pokémon or is challenged by another Trainer to a battle, the screen switches to a turn-based battle screen where the Pokémon fight. During the battle, the player may use a move, use an item, switch the active Pokémon, or flee. However, the player cannot flee a battle against another Trainer or against certain wild Pokémon that are stronger than the player's. When a Pokémon's HP is reduced to zero, it faints until it is revived. If an opposing Pokémon faints, all of the player's Pokémon who participated in defeating it receive experience points. After accumulating enough experience points, a Pokémon may level up, increasing its stats. Many Pokémon evolve into other forms after certain conditions are met, usually after reaching a certain level threshold or by having a certain item used on them. At the "Day Care" location, the player can breed two of their Pokémon—usually, a male and a female—to create Eggs that hatch into baby Pokémon at level 1.

Pokémon Black and White takes place in the Unova region, based on New York City. As with all regions, Unova consists of a number of cities and towns connected by "Routes". Random encounters may take place in tall grass along routes or in bodies of water. The player occasionally battles Trainers in cities and towns, as well as along routes. In addition, eight of the game's cities and towns are homes to "Gym Leaders", powerful Trainers specializing in certain types of Pokémon; beating a Gym Leader gives the player a "Badge". All eight Badges are needed to unlock the Pokémon League, where the player faces off against the "Elite Four" and, finally, the Champion. Across Unova, items can be found on the ground or purchased from "Poké Marts". For example, Hyper Potions restore HP, Antidotes cure poisoning, and Revives revitalize fainted Pokémon. TMs (Technical Machines) teach moves to Pokémon, and HMs (Hidden Machines) are a special class of TMs for important moves that allow the player to traverse the environment. The "Surf" HM move, for example, is used to cross bodies of water.

=== New features ===
The graphics have been improved from Diamond and Pearl. The dialog boxes of previous games have been changed to speech balloons that appear over other characters' heads, allowing more than one character to speak at once. Japanese players can have kanji appear on screen, rather than only hiragana and katakana. During battles, the sprites of the Pokémon are fully animated and the camera changes position to highlight specific parts of the battle. In addition to continuing the day and night cycle introduced in Gold and Silver, Black and White introduces a seasonal cycle, with the seasons advancing every month rather than being linked to the calendar. Outside areas appear differently depending on the season, such as changing of leaves in autumn or snow on the ground in winter. Certain areas are only accessible during certain seasons, and different Pokémon can be found in the wild in winter where others are encountered in the other seasons. The Pokémon Deerling and Sawsbuck change their physical appearance to match the seasons.

There are two new battle mechanics: Triple Battles and Rotation Battles. In Triple Battles, both teams must send out three Pokémon in a row at once; Some moves only allow Pokémon on the left or right side to attack the opponent's Pokémon on the same side or in the center. Changing position takes up one turn. In Rotation Battles, each side sends out three Pokémon at once, but they are arranged in a circle that can be rotated at will. Black has more Rotation Battles than Triple Battles, and the opposite is true in White. Another introduction is Combination Moves: a starter Pokémon can be taught one of three moves, and using them together in Double or Triple battles produces more powerful attacks. In the wild, walking through darker-colored tall grass can trigger Double Battles against wild Pokémon rather than only Single Battles with lighter-colored grass.

Occasionally, the player can find rustling patches of grass and rippling water, where they can encounter either a rare Pokémon, a Pokémon more common in the opposite game version, or the highest evolutionary form of a Pokémon whose lower forms can normally be found in the area. This is the only way to capture Pokémon such as Audino, Emolga, and Alomomola. Also, dust clouds in caves and the shadows of flying Pokémon on certain bridges can be entered to either find a rare item or encounter Drilbur, Excadrill, Ducklett, or Swanna, none of which can be found in the wild otherwise. Occasionally, when throwing a Poké Ball, the capture rate is highly increased, triggered by a random event. There are also new side-games and sidequests: the player can compete in Pokémon Musicals, a side-game similar to the Pokémon Contests of previous games; the Battle Subway, similar to the Battle Towers and Battle Frontiers of previous games; and on the Royal Unova, (Note: In the original Japanese release, this is named the Royal Isshu (ロイヤルイッシュ号, Roiyaru Isshu-gō)) a cruise ship that the player can ride and fight Trainers aboard to win otherwise rare items.

=== Connectivity to other devices ===
The bottom screen of the Nintendo DS displays the C-Gear, a game feature that controls how players connect with each other via IR or Wi-Fi.

The C-Gear (Note: C-Gear (Cギア, Shī Gia)) replaces the Pokétch from Diamond and Pearl on the Nintendo DS's bottom screen. It controls the game's wireless capabilities, including infrared (IR) communication for battling and trading, wireless communications in the Xtranceiver (Note: In the original Japanese release, this function is called the Live Caster (ライブキャスター, Raibu Kyasutā)) video chat access to the Entralink to transfer content from the Pokémon Dream World, using the Wi-Fi to sync with the Pokémon Global Link servers, and the new "Pass By mode" which allows the game to communicate with other copies through infrared while the DS is asleep. The Feeling Check (Note: Feeling Check (フィーリングチェック, Fīringu Chekku)) function tests the compatibility between two players and awards them items accordingly. In the "Pass By" feature, the player answers various survey questions and receives one of several items depending on how many other players they have connected with. In the "Random Matchup" feature, the player can battle others randomly. When playing against others online or in IR battles, a new mechanic called the Wonder Launcher (Note: In the original Japanese release, this function is called the Miracle Shooter (ミラクルシューター, Mirakuru Shūtā)) allows healing items to be used in battle.

Two features were added to transfer Pokémon from older DS Pokémon games to Black and White. For normal transfer, the Poké Transfer (Note: In the original Japanese release, this function is called the PokéShifter (ポケシフター, Pokeshifutā)) feature is available after completion of the main storyline. Unlike the "Pal Park" feature from previous games, the Poké Transfer is a mini-game in which after six Pokémon are transferred, the player uses the touch screen to launch Poké Balls at the transferred Pokémon to catch them within a time limit. Another feature called the Relocator (Note: In the original Japanese release, this function is called the Transfer Machine (てんそうマシン, Tensō Mashin)) is used to transfer the Pokémon given away in promotions for the film Pokémon: Zoroark: Master of Illusions so the player can obtain the rare Pokémon Zorua and Zoroark. Unlike the Poké Transfer, this is available before the main game is completed.

Unique to Black and White was the Pokémon Dream World, which was dependent on the official Pokémon Global Link website. Here, the player could befriend Pokémon that are not normally obtainable in-game and that had unique abilities. This occurred after syncing the game back with the Dream World, similarly to the Pokéwalker from HeartGold and SoulSilver. The player could maintain a house in the Dream World that other players could visit as well as grow berries. In addition to allowing access to Pokémon acquired in the Dream World, the Entralink also enabled players to interact with each other and play side games. These side-games awarded points that can be traded for temporary powers such as increasing experience, improving capture rate, or lowering prices of items in Poké Marts. Online services for the games were shut down in January 2014.

== Plot ==
=== Setting ===
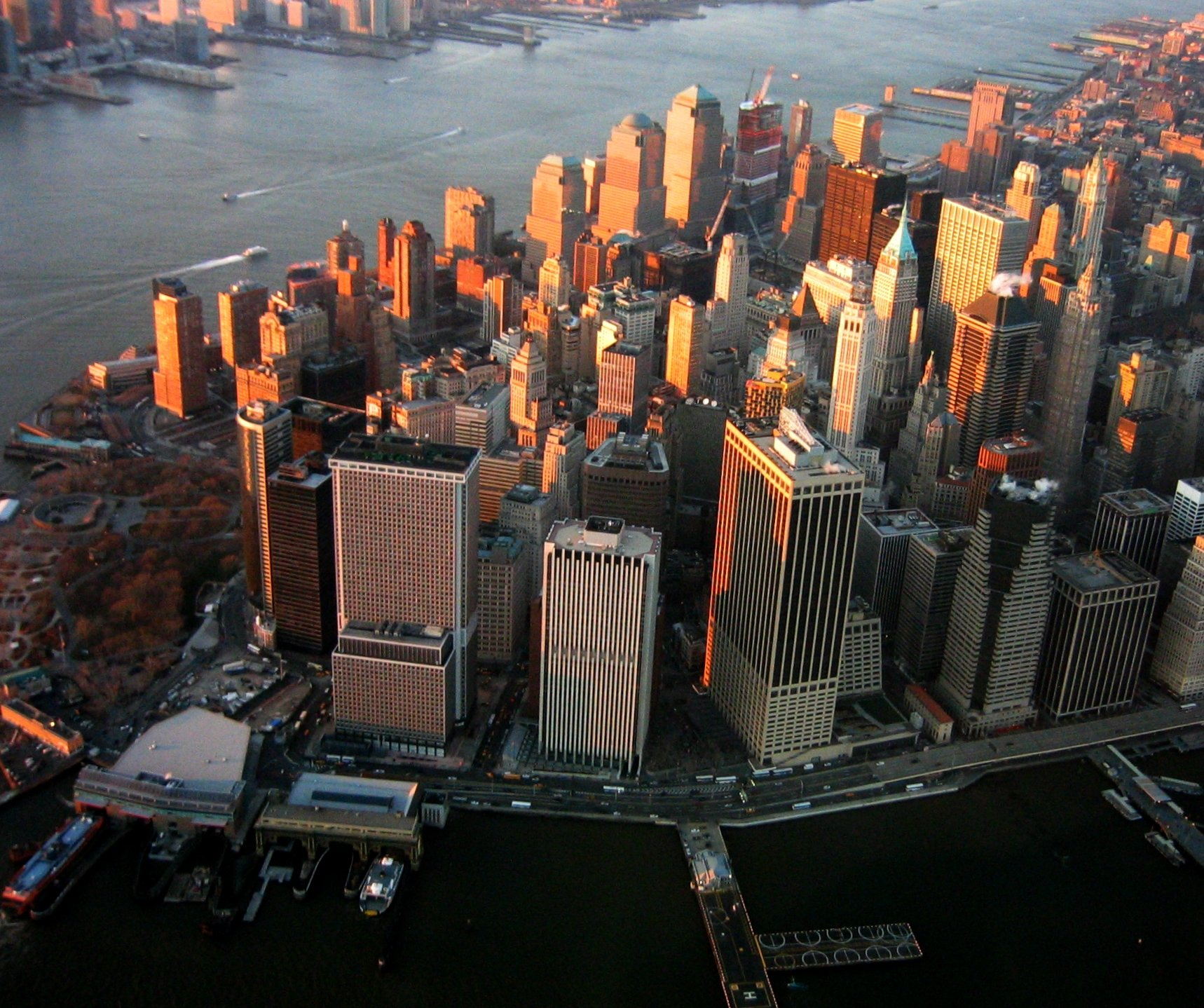
New York City was used as the basis for Unova. Specifically, Castelia City features tall buildings and an urban setting and is the region's "central metropolis".

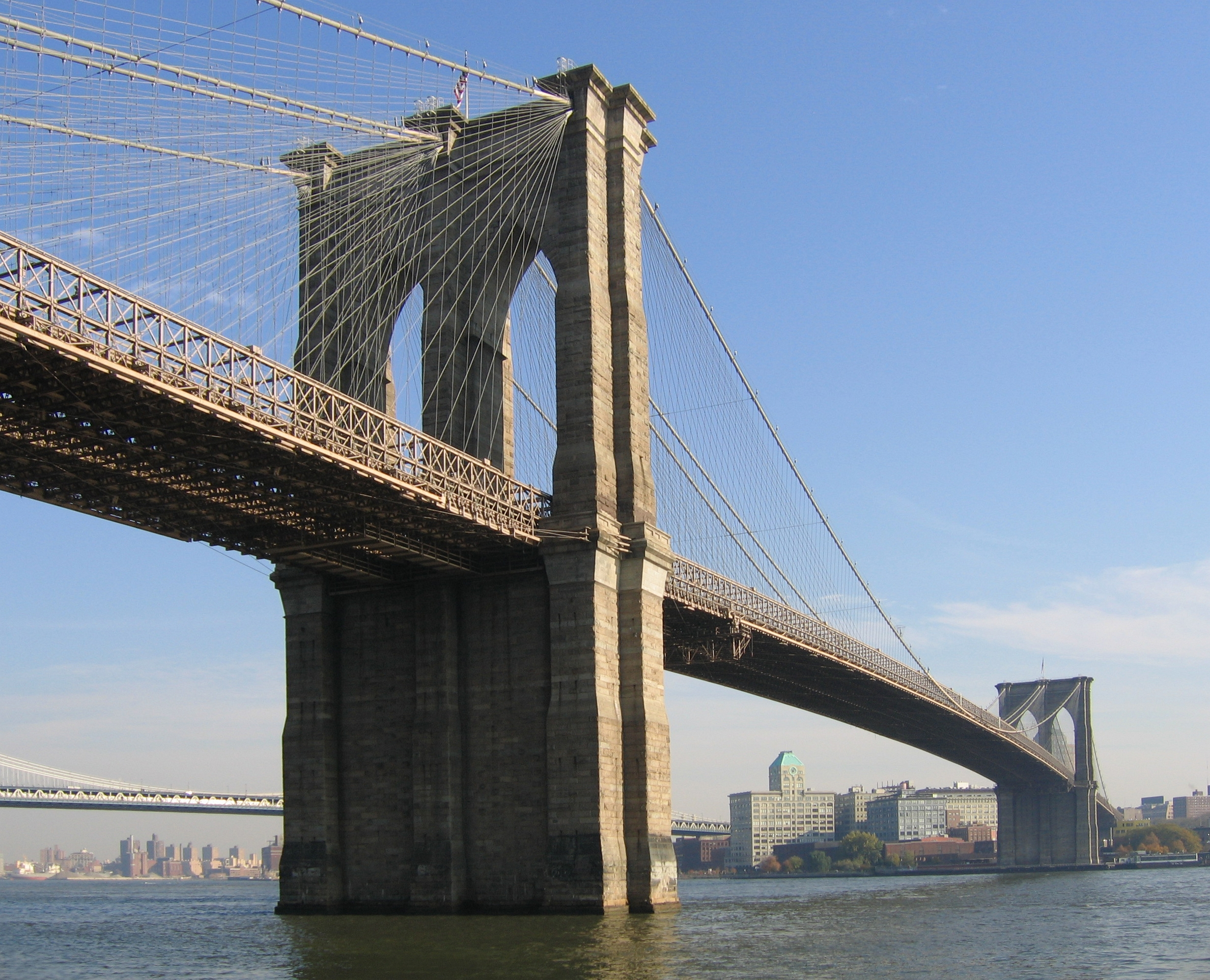
The Brooklyn Bridge was used as inspiration for the Skyarrow Bridge in Unova.

Black and White are set in the Unova Region, part of a continental mass located far away from the previous regions, Kanto, Johto, Hoenn, and Sinnoh. Unlike the previous regions which were based on real locations in Japan, Unova is modeled after New York City, an idea developed by game director Junichi Masuda when he visited the city for the launch of Diamond and Pearl. One particular example of this is Castelia City, which serves as the region's central metropolis and had such inspirations as Skyarrow Bridge its "Brooklyn Bridge-style suspension bridge" and its "huge skyscrapers". Masuda also wanted to convey a "feeling of communities" in Castelia's streets. Unova is host to large urban areas, a harbor, an airport, an amusement park, several bridges, and several mountain ranges. In addition to a diversity of new landscapes, the Unova region is also home to a diversity of people who vary in skin tone, language, and occupation. The region's Japanese name "Isshu" (イッシュ) is derived from the Japanese words tashu (多種, meaning "many kinds") and isshu (一種, meaning "one kind"); the many kinds of people and Pokémon seen up close look like only one kind of life from afar.

=== Story ===
Like previous Pokémon games, Black and White both follow a linear storyline; the main events occur in a fixed order. The protagonist of Pokémon Black and White is Hilbert or Hilda (depending on whether the player chooses to play as a boy or a girl), who journeys through Unova to become a Pokémon Master. At the beginning of the games, the player chooses either Snivy, Tepig, or Oshawott as their Starter Pokémon as a gift from Professor Aurea Juniper. The protagonist's friends, Cheren and Bianca, are also rival Pokémon Trainers who occasionally battle the player; Cheren will choose the Pokémon with a type advantage against the player's, while Bianca will choose the Pokémon with a type disadvantage. The player's primary goal is to obtain the eight Gym Badges of Unova and ultimately challenge the Elite Four and the Unova League Champion to complete the main story.

In addition to the standard gameplay, the player will also have to defeat the games' main antagonist force, Team Plasma, a Knights Templar-esque group who claim that Pokémon are oppressed by humanity and seek to liberate them from their trainers. Team Plasma is led by N, a young man who was brought up alongside Pokémon and sees them as friends rather than tools for sport. Throughout the game, the player has some encounters with N, who claims that by capturing one of the Legendary Pokémon (Reshiram and Zekrom) of Unova and defeating the Unova League Champion Alder, he will be recognized as Unova's hero and will be able to convince the humans to part with their Pokémon. Depending on the game version, N will capture Reshiram in White or Zekrom in Black.

After the player defeats the Elite Four and enters the Unova League Champion's chamber, he or she finds that N has defeated Alder and become the newest Unova League Champion. Soon after, he summons a large castle surrounding the Unova League, challenging the player to find him to participate in one final battle. When the player finally reaches him, Reshiram in Black or Zekrom in White appears before the player, and the player must capture the Legendary Pokémon to prove their worth before challenging N. After his defeat, N laments the possibility that his ideals are mistaken, Ghetsis intrudes and angrily reveals that his true intentions were to use N to ensure that he would be the only human left with control over Pokémon and use them to rule the world, having groomed N as a child to be a pawn. In his rage, Ghetsis challenges the player to a true final battle. After Ghetsis's defeat, he is arrested, allowing Alder to resume his position as the Unova League Champion and pardons N. N then thanks the player for helping realize his mistake about the nature of the relationship between people and their Pokémon and wishing them well before saying goodbye and leaving the castle on his dragon of choice to a far-off land, wanting to find more about the world.

In the postgame, Looker arrives in Unova and tasks the player with finding the remaining Sages of Team Plasma, so they can be brought to justice. The player can also challenge the Elite Four once again, and challenge Alder, ultimately becoming the new Unova League Champion. The player also gains access to the eastern portion of Unova, which contains Pokémon from the previous games in the series, as well as access to an area unique to each game version: the ultra-metropolitan Black City, home to powerful Pokémon Trainers; and the White Forest, home to humans and Pokémon living in harmony. Cynthia, the former Sinnoh League Champion, is also found in this area of the game and can be challenged. A non-player character named after Shigeki Morimoto, a Game Freak programmer, creature designer, and the director of the Pokémon HeartGold and SoulSilver games, can also be found and battled in the game.

== Development ==
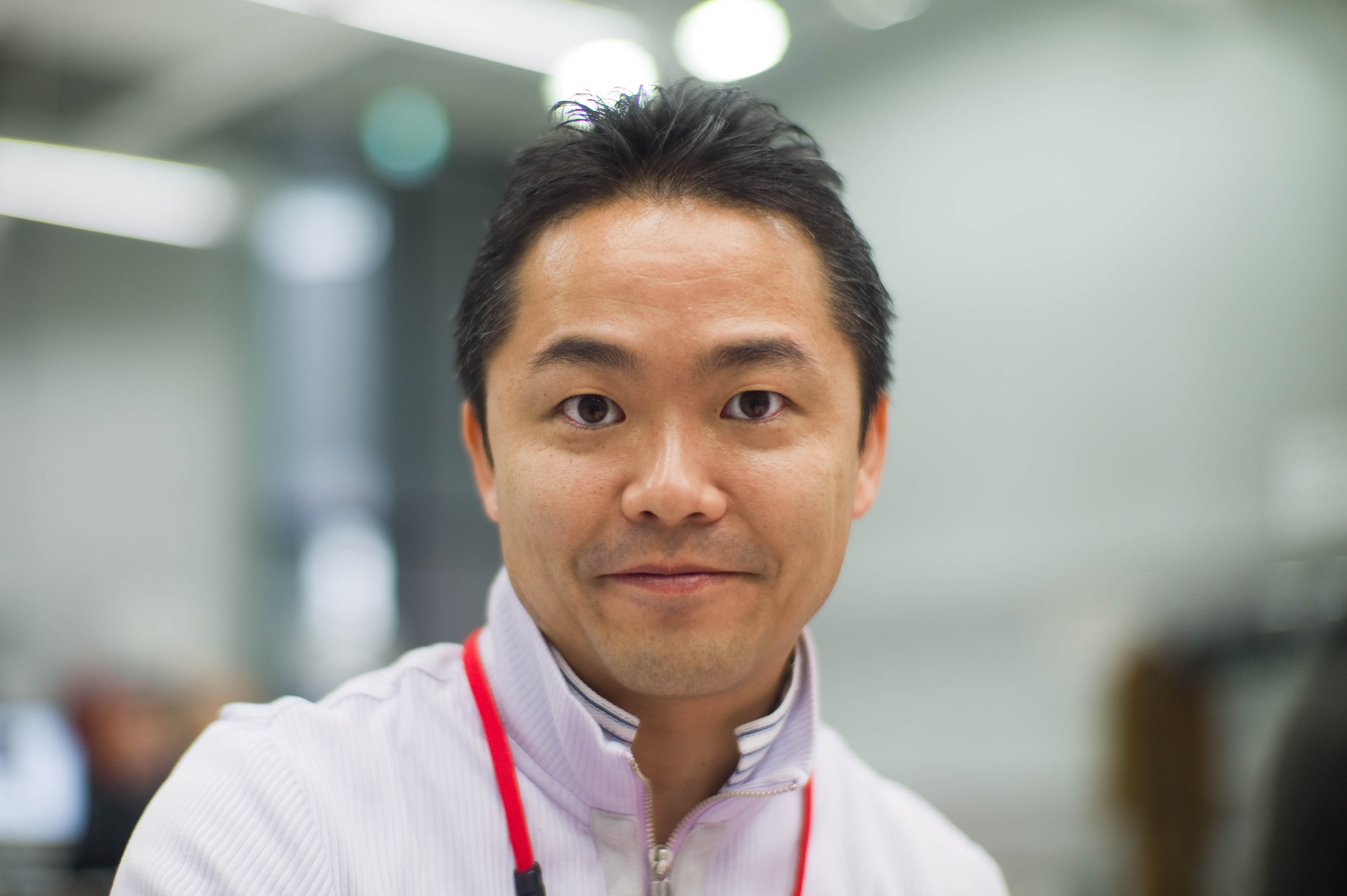
Junichi Masuda was responsible for the direction and the music of the games.

On 29 January 2010, The Pokémon Company announced that a new game was in development for the Nintendo DS to be released later that year. Director Junichi Masuda stated that several aspects of the series were being revamped for the new generation. On 9 April 2010, the Japanese website updated with the titles of the versions as Pokémon Black and White and announced a Q3 2010 release date. The games feature an improved visual style from other Pokémon games, with an increased use of 3D computer graphics than any other of the handheld series. It also has a special feature that allows the user to upload their saved game to the Internet, allowing them to do certain things on an official website.

On 3 August 2010, Masuda announced on his blog that the Black and White game versions will initially only contain brand-new Pokémon to evoke a feeling of it being a brand-new game, like when the original Pokémon games were first released. In all of the games following the first generation, there were a series of new Pokémon introduced interspersed with Pokémon from the previous generations. For example, Pikachu was introduced in Red and Green and was obtainable in Blue, Yellow and all subsequent main series games; however, Pikachu will not be obtainable in Black and White from the start of the game.

It was later confirmed that Black and White are region locked on the Nintendo DSi and 3DS.

Game director and composer Junichi Masuda stated that to keep the games fresh, he looks at every previous element to decide what to adapt to the new game, stating "people may not like what they like in the past, trend wise". He explained the new battle styles, stating that while triple battles take more strategy, rotation battles take more luck to win. Masuda stated that their goal when making the games was to make it fun for new players, but they also wanted to get players who have not played the series in a while to come back. He said that it was hard to find that balance to satisfy both kinds of players. For the new players, there is good explanation in how to play, while for old players, they incorporated the C-Gear, which makes the ability to trade and battle easier. When asked about the decision to introduce over 150 new species of Pokémon, Masuda stated that they did this so old players would not be able to know what is a good Pokémon to use, and it would level the playing ground for new players.

=== Music ===
Nintendo DS Pokémon Black · White Super Music Collection (Note: Japanese: ニンテンドーDS ポケットモンスター ブラック・ホワイト スーパーミュージックコレクション, Hepburn: Nintendō Dī Esu Poketto Monsutā Burakku · Howaito Sūpā Myūjikku Korekushon) is a four-disc soundtrack featuring the games' music scored by Masuda, Go Ichinose, Shota Kageyama, Hitomi Sato, Morikazu Aoki, Minako Adachi, and Satoshi Nohara. The soundtrack was released on 20 October 2010, in Japan. Ichinose was in charge of directing all Pokémon voices for the game while Adachi produced all sound effects.

== Promotion and release ==
Pokémon Black and White were released in Japan on 18 September 2010. They were later released in Europe on 4 March 2011, in North America on 6 March 2011, and in Australia on 10 March 2011.

=== Japanese release ===
A silhouette of a new Pokémon was shown by Junichi Masuda on the 7 February 2010 episode of Pokémon Sunday, stated to be in the film for the summer and to be identified in a future episode on 21 February. This new Pokémon was also featured in the March 2010 issue of CoroCoro Comic available on 15 February. Since then, the Pokémon has been named "Zoroark", and it evolves from a Pokémon named "Zorua". Both were featured in the film Pocket Monsters Diamond & Pearl The Movie: Phantom Ruler: Zoroark. For pre-order ticket holders, an alternate-colored Raikou, Entei, or Suicune was available for transfer to their Diamond, Pearl, Platinum, HeartGold, or SoulSilver games. At the theater, players would be able to download a Celebi to the same games. These Pokémon would activate special events in Black and White involving Zoroark and Zorua respectively.

On 18 April 2010, the episode of Pokémon Sunday showed game footage of a player character walking around in a 3D environment and a single screenshot depicting a battle between the player's Zoroark and an enemy Zorua. Host Shoko Nakagawa made note of how the player's Zoroark's sprite was a full body sprite as viewed from behind, when in the past all such sprites only showed a smaller portion of the player's Pokémon's body. On 9 May 2010, the episode of Pokémon Sunday revealed silhouettes of the three Pokémon available to choose from at the beginning of the games, which were later revealed to be the Grass Snake Pokémon Tsutarja, the Fire Pig Pokémon Pokabu, and the Sea Otter Pokémon Mijumaru. Other information revealed is that the game takes place in the Isshu Region which includes the Hiun City metropolis. On 16 May 2010, the episode of Pokémon Sunday showed game battle footage, illustrating the new in-battle animations and dynamic camera positioning; also described were Zoroark's Illusion ability and the special Zoroark acquired by the movie ticket pre-order gift Pokémon.

On 28 May 2010, both the official Japanese and English Pokémon websites revealed names and designs of the two major legendary Pokémon of these games, who also serve as the game version mascots: the White Yang Pokémon Reshiram for Pokémon Black and the Black Yin Pokémon Zekrom for Pokémon White. The July 2010 issue of CoroCoro Comic revealed the C-Gear wireless interactivity features, the ability to upload game data to the internet and the player's computer, several brand-new Pokémon, new Pokémon moves, Reshiram and Zekrom's Pokémon types, details on the Celebi / Zorua event, and a new character: Professor Araragi, the first female Pokémon professor to appear in the video games. The 27 June 2010, episode of Pokémon Sunday, made the announcement of the release date as 18 September 2010, and a yet-to-be named character. The 28 June episode of Oha Suta, showed a trailer, which included its release date, new gameplay footage, several new characters, more new Pokémon, and a three-on-three battle system. The August 2010 issue of CoroCoro Comic elaborated upon many new game mechanics: the three-on-three system, the online Global Link system, an online Dream World that can allow for access to other Pokémon, access to an area that uses the Wi-Fi called the Hilink (similar to the Underground), a special feature called the Live Caster for video chat on the Nintendo DSi and Nintendo 3DS, kanji support, aesthetic differences between the two versions of the game, areas exclusive to the game versions, new characters, new moves, new abilities, and new Pokémon.

The 25 July 2010, episode of Pokémon Sunday introduced the new phantom Pokémon Victini, which initially appeared in a trailer for the 2011 Pokémon film that was shown with screenings of Phantom Ruler: Zoroark. It is noted to be Pokémon No. 000 in Isshu's regional Pokédex, and is only accessible by downloading a special item from Nintendo Wi-Fi Connection, DS Stations, and Nintendo Zones (such as those found in Japanese McDonald's restaurants) to a game save. This was initially available for a month following the games' release date. Another promotional Pokémon given out after the games' release is a Kumasyun, a Pokémon that is difficult to find in the games unless it is during the games' winter season.

On the day of the Japanese release, Nintendo of America sent cease and desist letters to two English language Pokémon fansites, PokéBeach and Serebii, after they published screenshots and various other media from the newly released games. Nintendo claimed the posting of the media was infringing copyright and noted their intention to shut down the websites under the Digital Millennium Copyright Act unless the media was removed. The screenshots were subsequently taken down from both websites. Luke Plunkett of video game blog Kotaku initially speculated that Nintendo of America issued the cease and desist letters over the belief that the images were illegally obtained via a ROM image; however, Jon Sahagian of PokéBeach stated the images in question had been obtained from the Japanese forum 2channel. Charlie Scibetta, Nintendo of America's senior director of corporate communications, later stated that it was the choice of images that were of concern to the company. In a statement to Kotaku, he said, "Nintendo supports and appreciates the efforts that Pokémon fans go through to create fan sites. In most cases there is no issue with the content that is posted, but on this occasion we had to contact a select few websites to ask them to take down confidential images".

=== International release ===
The foreign promotion for the games began on 22 November 2010, when the official website for the North American, European, and Australian markets was updated, which included the localized names of the starter Pokémon (Snivy, Tepig, and Oshawott) in English, Dutch, Italian, Portuguese, and Spanish markets and the games' setting in the Unova region. Floats of version mascots Reshiram and Zekrom accompanied the Pikachu balloon during the Macy's Thanksgiving Day Parade on 25 November 2010, the following Thursday.

On 27 December 2010, the official websites for the international releases updated once more, revealing the English names for many of the first Pokémon revealed during the promotion for the Japanese release. In addition, the English names for the game location Hiun City and the character Professor Araragi were revealed to be Castelia City and Professor Juniper, respectively.

Starting on 3 January and lasting until 9 January 2011, in the United States, players of Diamond, Pearl, Platinum, HeartGold, and SoulSilver were able to visit GameStop stores to download the special shiny Raikou that was previously given out for Phantom Ruler: Zoroark pre-order ticket holders in Japan. Similar downloads would be available for the shiny Entei from 17 to 23 January, and shiny Suicune from 31 January to 6 February. All three of these Pokémon still enabled the event for Zoroark in the North American Black and White versions. These three Pokémon were later distributed via the Nintendo Wi-Fi Connection for European, Australian, and North American markets (for a second time) starting 7 to 13 February with Raikou, again, with subsequent staggered releases for Entei and Suicune throughout February.

The Celebi event was run in North America and distributed through GameStop stores from 21 February to 6 March 2011, or it could be acquired from the tour promoting the Black and White games that began on 5 February 2011. In France and Spain, this same Celebi was available through various retailers from 1 February through 3 March 2011. Italian players could get this Celebi from specific video game retailers from 21 January through 3 March.

The event to distribute the item to allow players to capture Victini was also run following the games' release internationally. North American players were able to download the item from Nintendo Wi-Fi Connection from 6 March to 10 April 2011. European players were able to get the item from 4 March to 22 April. Australian players were able to download it from 10 March to 28 April 2011.

== Reception ==
=== Critical response ===
Reception

Aggregate score
Aggregator	Score
Metacritic	87/100

Review scores
Publication	Score
Edge	8/10
Famitsu	40/40
Game Informer	8.75/10
GameSpot	7.5/10
GamesRadar+	9/10
IGN	9/10
Nintendo Power	9/10
Official Nintendo Magazine	95%
VideoGamer.com	9/10

Pokémon Black and White have received largely positive reviews by critics, having an aggregate score of 87% on Metacritic, indicating "generally favorable reviews". Japanese magazine Famitsu Weekly awarded the game a perfect 40/40 score, becoming the 15th game to receive such a distinction, as well as obtaining the highest score ever given to a Pokémon video game by the publication. Game Informer's Annette Gonzalez remarked that "Pokémon Black and White do a great job building upon already solid features and taking them to the next level." VideoGamer.com's Jamin Smith criticized the games for not innovating as much as some people would have liked, but stated that "rest assured in the knowledge that Black and White are damn fine games; the best the series has to offer." Official Nintendo Magazine referred to them as "A beautiful refinement of a great series [...] the best Pokémon ever." Nintendo Power expressed that "the Pokémon series's latest pair of adventures is as addictive as ever." Edge acknowledged that "where next for Pokémon, Black and White don't suggest any answers, but they do remind us why we'd care in the first place."

IGN gave the games a 9/10, a higher rating than any of the other Nintendo DS Pokémon games. The review praised the games for renewing interest in the series, though criticized some of the new Pokémon designs, explaining that "aside from a weaker lineup of monsters (largely an aesthetic complaint), this is the best Pokémon has to offer on every level, renewing my waning interest in monster battling". Jeremy Parish of Retronauts criticized Black and White, commenting that he grew tired of it shortly after starting and feeling like it was too similar to all previous Pokémon games. He further went on to say that EVs and IVs, invisible mechanics in the game, are not necessarily beneficial. By contrast, he noted that it would be great to new players. He also compared it to the Pokémon Mystery Dungeon games and Final Fantasy XIII, arguing that they all share the common element of being bad before they get good. Fellow Retronauts contributor Justin Haywald criticized the games' release on the DS, which had received two main Pokémon series games published before them. GamesRadar editor Carolyn Gudmundson stated "It may not break the Pokemon mold, but Black and White offers enough new content coupled with the series' classic, deep battle mechanics to make it endlessly playable. If you could only play one game for the rest of your life, this would be a wise choice."

=== Commercial performance ===
In August 2010, one month before the games' release in Japan, Pokémon Black and White gained a total of 1.08 million pre-orders, becoming the fastest game on the Nintendo DS to break the 1 million mark. In the first two days on sale, it sold more than 2.6 million copies, becoming the biggest launch in the series history in Japan. By 3 November, the games had sold over 4.3 million copies in Japan. As of 9 January 2011, the games became the fastest DS titles to sell 5 million copies.

Upon its release in the UK, White and Black took the #1 and #2 spots respectively in the UK overall sales charts, with White becoming the second fastest-selling DS game ever in the UK after Professor Layton and Pandora's Box, selling 13,000 more copies than Black. Combined, their sales became Nintendo's third biggest ever launch in the UK, behind Wii Fit and Mario Kart Wii, and the biggest opening weekend ever for a pair of Pokémon titles.

In the US, Black and White sold more than 1.08 million copies on day one, breaking the previous day-one record held by predecessors Diamond and Pearl of 780,000 copies. According to the NPD Group, Nintendo sold 1.3 million units of White and 1.1 million units of Black in March 2011, making them the #1 and #2 top selling games in the US for the month. In April 2011, Nintendo's financial earnings report confirmed that Pokémon Black and White had sold 11.5 million copies worldwide, making them the highest selling DS games for Nintendo in the 2010–11 financial year, and third overall, behind only the Wii games, Wii Sports and Wii Sports Resort. As of September 2017, the games' combined sales have reached 15.64 million.

== Legacy ==
=== Sequels ===
Sequels to Black and White, Pokémon Black 2 and Pokémon White 2, were released for the Nintendo DS in 2012.

=== Other ===
The second part of the Pokémon Scarlet and Violet DLC The Hidden Treasure of Area Zero takes place in the Blueberry Academy, a terrarium off the coast of Unova.
