= Victini =

Pokémon species

- Pokémon character
- Victini artwork by Ken Sugimori
- First appearance: Pokémon Black and White (2010)
- Created by: Junichi Masuda
- Designed by: Mana Ibe; Ken Sugimori (finalized)
- Voiced by: Nana Mizuki

In-universe information
- Species: Pokémon
- Type: Psychic and Fire

Victini (/vɪkˈtiːniː/; Japanese: ビクティニ, Hepburn: Bikutini) is a Pokémon species in Nintendo and Game Freak's Pokémon franchise. Created by Junichi Masuda and designed by artist Mana Ibe, Victini first appeared in the video games Pokémon Black and White, later appearing in various merchandise, spinoff titles and animated and printed adaptations of the franchise.

== Conception and design ==
Victini is a species of fictional creatures called Pokémon, created for the Pokémon media franchise. Developed by Game Freak and published by Nintendo, the Japanese franchise began in 1996 with the video games Pokémon Red and Green for the Game Boy, which were later released in North America as Pokémon Red and Blue in 1998. In these games and their sequels, the player assumes the role of a Trainer whose goal is to capture and use the creatures' special abilities to combat other Pokémon. Each Pokémon has one or two elemental types, which define its advantages and disadvantages when battling other Pokémon. A major goal in each game is to complete the Pokédex, a comprehensive Pokémon encyclopedia, by capturing, evolving, and trading with other Trainers to obtain individuals from all Pokémon species.

The species was introduced in Pokémon Black and White, titles produced for the Nintendo DS. In contrast to previous entries, director Junichi Masuda wanted to "play up the coolness" of Pokémon introduced in the title, and to that end the designs gravitated more towards using angular and sharp lines instead of rounded ones. In an interview with Nintendo Power, Masuda additionally noted that improvements in gaming hardware had also impacted their approach compared to previous entries, as it allowed for more detailed designs. Initially, roughly three times the number of necessary designs were conceived for the game, with designers bringing rough sketches to lead artist Ken Sugimori, who would speak with them individually regarding the features and the design would be revised. Those that made the final cut were then finalized by Sugimori who drew them in his own art style.

=== Design ===
Victini, known as the Victory Pokémon, is a small, rabbit-like Pokémon. It has blue eyes and yellow-ish fur. Victini has large, pointed ears that form a V-shape. In its shiny form, its fur becomes white and its eyes and ears become brighter in color. In-universe, it is believed that a trainer with a Victini will always win any kind of battle; Victini can also produce infinite energy within itself that it can share with others just by touching them, and making their bodies overflow with power. Its name derives from the words "victory" and "tiny".

Victini was created by Masuda, who stated the concept came from the idea that "Pokémon can lead you to victory, and I think Victini really gives you this really cool feeling that it could get you to victory from anywhere". He additionally named it one of his favorite in the series, as he tended to like more cute Pokémon, and the best of those introduced in Black and White. Victini was designed by Mana Ibe, under the instructions from game director Junichi Masuda that it would be more appealing to women than men, an idea he thought worked well. Describing it as a "pretty self-explanatory design", Sugimori in an interview with Japanese magazine Nintendo Dream stated that Masuda conceived the idea early in development. He additionally attributed Victini's V-shaped head to Masuda, with the idea being it would convey to the player that it would bring them luck.

== Appearances ==
Victini, similar to earlier Pokémon species Mew, Celebi, Jirachi, and Shaymin, can only be obtained via an official distribution events. In the story of the games, this Victini was brought to Liberty Garden and locked up in a room to keep it safe and make sure it never fell into the wrong hands. Team Plasma arrives on the island to free Victini into the world, and the player must stop them and then capture Victini, as it wishes to find a worthy trainer. Victini has the Unova regional Pokédex #000, which makes it the first non-glitch Pokémon that has such designation in any regional Pokédex. Victini also appears in the Pokémon spin-off game Battle & Get! Pokémon Typing DS where players type in the names of Pokémon that they see. It is also a non-player character in PokéPark 2: Wonders Beyond and Pokémon Mystery Dungeon: Gates to Infinity. Victini also appears in Super Smash Bros. for Nintendo 3DS and Wii U as a Master Ball Pokémon.

In a teaser trailer shown by Pokémon Sunday, alongside with Unova's legendary Pokémon, Zekrom and Reshiram, Victini starred in the 14th Pokémon films Pokémon the Movie: Black—Victini and Reshiram and White—Victini and Zekrom.

== Promotion and reception ==
Starting the release of Pokémon Black and White in Japan on September 18, 2010, the company released the Liberty Ticket (リバティチケット, Ribati Chiketto), a special item that allows players to get in touch and capture Victini that cannot be caught normally in the games. In English speaking countries, the item is known as the Liberty Pass and was distributed from March 6 to April 10, 2011, in the United States, Canada, and Australia, while distributions in European nations occurred from March 4 to April 22. Another unique Victini was released for a promotion for the Victini and the Black Hero: Zekrom and Victini and the White Hero: Reshiram films, which has an attack which cannot be learned by the Victini given out to commemorate the games' release.

Jamie Block of The Mary Sue described it as a combination of a chicken, bunny, and the Pokémon Pachirisu, adding that it didn't feel particularly groundbreaking and instead a generic cuddly species players would normally encounter early on in the game. When early reveals designated it as #000 in the Pokédex, Block questioned what exactly this meant, believing this meant it preceded Bulbasaur in the Pokédex, and further wondered if it was similar to the Pokémon Eevee and its multiple evolution options. Upon discovering Victini's typing, they expressed interest in it still, stating "First V was for Victory, then V was for Vendetta, and now V is for Victini!"

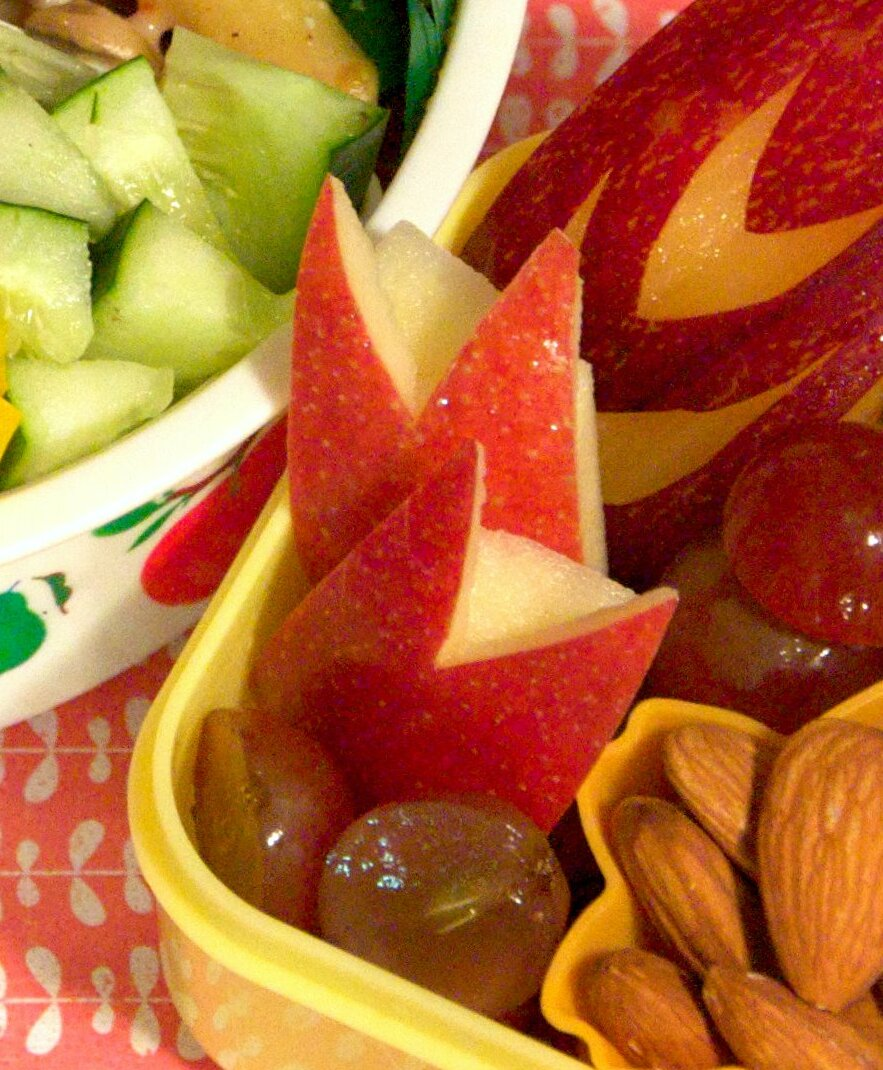
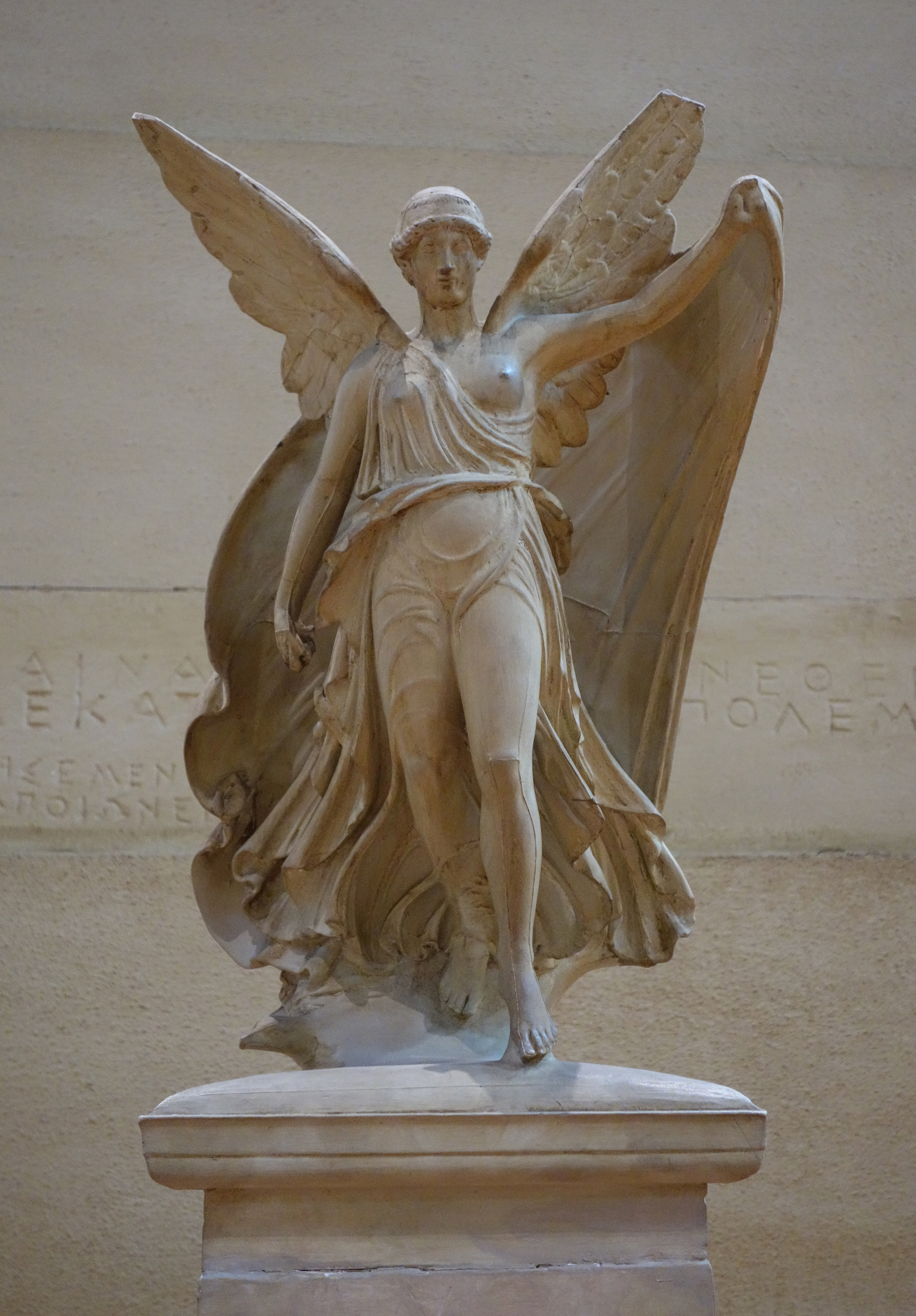
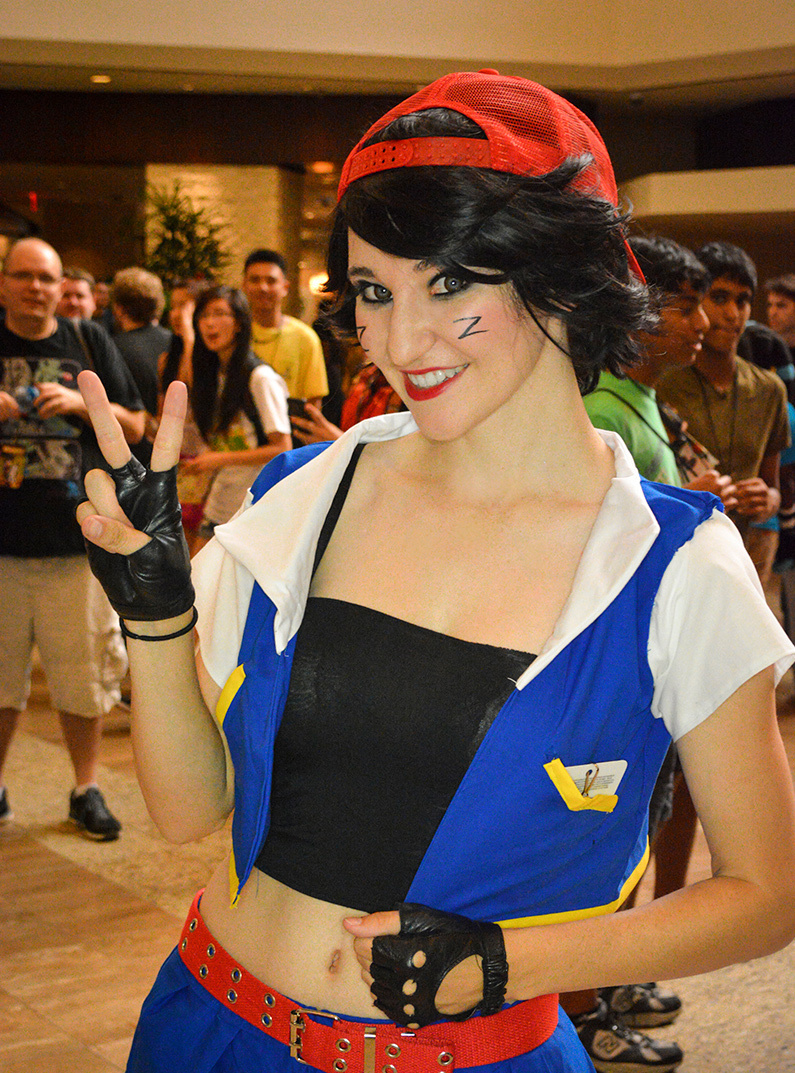
Left to right: Victini's design has been compared to usagi-ringo used in kyaraben, the goddess Nike, and the V sign.

Victini's design has been speculated to have stemmed from different concepts. is believed to be based on usagi-ringo, a form of kyaraben in which Japanese people cut apples into segments resembling rabbits. Other speculated design inspirations are symbols of victory, such as the goddesses of victory, Victoria and Nike. Eurogamer's Lottie Lynn believed that Victini's design and name were possibly inspired by V, the roman numeral for 5, which was meant to reflect the Pokémon generation Victini was introduced in.

GamesRadar's Carolyn Gudmundson commented that it was "definitely worthy of his legendary status" due to its power, also praising it for being cute like Celebi, Mew, Jirachi, and Shaymin, but unique from them as well. She describes it as "cute yet aggressive", adding on that it is "ultra-Japanese", citing its "V-for-victory hand pose and bento apple rabbit ear design." When the design was revealed, GamesRadar discussed whether Victini was "cool or not", with the question of the week being what the readers thought of it, specifically whether it held up to previous cute legendary Pokémon. Joystiq's Griffin McElroy called it adorable.

During the release of The Crown Tundra downloadable content for Pokémon Sword and Shield, fan communities datamined the files and found evidence that Victini would be obtainable. Several theories emerged on the exact conditions to unlock Victini, though after extensive testing the community dug deeper to find that while the content flagged Victini as an available encounter, the rest of the files to allow the player to were absent. Josh Brown of Fanbyte commented on the event, comparing it to how rumors arose in similar games, and stated that such theories were an entrenched part of Pokémon's pop culture. He further added that given the fragmented nature of the fandom, rumors were likely to persist for years to come.
