= Dano =

Dano may refer to:

== People ==
- Dano (name)
- Ken Daneyko (born 1964), Canadian retired National Hockey League player nicknamed "Dano"

== Places ==
- Dano Department, a department or commune in Burkina Faso
- Dano, Burkina Faso, a town and capital of the department
- Dano (woreda), a district in the Oromia Region of Ethiopia

== Other uses ==
- Dano language of Papua New Guinea
- Dano (Korean festival), the Korean equivalent of the Double Fifth festival
- BeOS R5.1d0, a prerelease of the Be Operating System also known as Dano

== See also ==
- Danno (disambiguation)
- Deno (disambiguation)
- Lambert Daneau (c. 1535–c. 1590), French jurist and Calvinist theologian
