= Zoroark =

Pokémon species

- Pokémon character
- Zoroark artwork by Ken Sugimori
- First appearance: Pokémon—Zoroark: Master of Illusions (2010)
- First game: Pokémon Black and White (2010)
- Created by: Atsuko Nishida
- Designed by: Atsuko Nishida; Ken Sugimori (finalized)
- Voiced by: Romi Park (film); Ryota Iwasaki (anime)

In-universe information
- Species: Pokémon
- Type: Dark; Normal and Ghost (Hisuian)

Zoroark (/ˈzɔːroʊɑːrk/; Japanese: ゾロアーク, Hepburn: Zoroāku) is a Pokémon species in Nintendo and Game Freak's Pokémon media franchise. First introduced in the film Pokémon—Zoroark: Master of Illusions and later in the video games Pokémon Black and White, it was created by Atsuko Nishida with the design finalized by Sugimori. Zoroark has since appeared in multiple games including Pokémon Go and the Pokémon Trading Card Game, as well as various merchandise. In anime media related to the franchise, Zoroark is voiced by Romi Park in the movie Pokémon—Zoroark: Master of Illusions, and Ryota Iwasaki in the series.

Classified as a Dark-type Pokémon, Zoroark evolves from the Pokémon Zorua, with both initially available through a special event in the original game. Zoroark is a large fox-like creature with a dark-grey body and a large red mane, able to disguise itself as other living creatures using illusions. A regional variant was added in Pokémon Legends: Arceus called Hisuian Zoroark. Featuring a white-bodied design with a more disheveled mane, it represents Zoroark that died after being chased from their natural habitat and is classified as a Normal- and Ghost-type.

Zoroark's heavily marketed promotional debut drew comparisons to Lucario, another Pokémon that received similar marketing attention. Called the mascot of Black and White, its design was heavily praised as fitting its character theme, compared to a kitsune and a werewolf. Its ability also garnered approval, particularly for the strategic depth it added to the gameplay. Hisuian Zoroark received similar praise, but was also regarded as a statement about colonialism, and represented one of the darker aspects of the Pokémon franchise.

== Conception and design ==
Zoroark is a species of fictional creatures called Pokémon, created for the Pokémon media franchise. Developed by Game Freak and published by Nintendo, the Japanese franchise began in 1996 with the video games Pokémon Red and Green for the Game Boy, which were later released in North America as Pokémon Red and Blue in 1998. In these games and their sequels, the player assumes the role of a Trainer whose goal is to capture and use the creatures' special abilities to combat other Pokémon. Each Pokémon has one or two elemental types, which define its advantages and disadvantages when battling other Pokémon. A major goal in each game is to complete the Pokédex, a comprehensive Pokémon encyclopedia, by capturing, evolving, and trading with other Trainers to obtain individuals from all Pokémon species.

The species was introduced in Pokémon Black and White, titles produced for the Nintendo DS. In contrast to previous entries, director Junichi Masuda wanted to "play up the coolness" of Pokémon introduced in the title, and to that end the designs gravitated more towards using angular and sharp lines instead of rounded ones. In an interview with Nintendo Power, Masuda additionally noted that improvements in gaming hardware had also impacted their approach compared to previous entries, as it allowed for more detailed designs. Initially, roughly three times the number of necessary designs were conceived for the game, with designers bringing rough sketches to lead artist Ken Sugimori, who would speak with them individually regarding the features and the design would be revised. Those that made the final cut were then finalized by Sugimori who drew them in his own art style. Called Zoroaku in Japanese, its name in English is a combination of "Zorro", the Spanish word for fox, and dark.

Hisuian Zoroark in Pokémon Legends: Arceus

Zoroark evolves from Zorua, after the latter has obtained enough experience. Both were created by Atsuko Nishida, who, after designing Vulpix and Ninetales for Red and Blue, had wanted to create another fox Pokémon. During Black and White's development, she had seen the film Helen the Baby Fox, and finding it to be a sad story she felt motivated to design more "lively" fox characters instead. Later in Pokémon Legends: Arceus, a game set in the franchise's Hisui region and featuring Pokémon designs as they would have appeared hundreds of years prior to the events of sequel titles Pokémon Diamond and Pearl, Hisuian variants of Zorua and Zoroark were introduced. Classified as Normal- and Ghost-type Pokémon, they were also designed by Nishida. Zoroark has a unique ability called Illusion, which allows it to disguise itself as any other living creature, including humans. In-game, this ability allows Zoroark to disguise itself as the last Pokémon in the player's lineup.

=== Design ===
Classified as a Dark-type Pokémon, Zoroark stands 5 feet 3 inches (160 cm) tall. It resembles a large, fox-like creature with dark-grey fur, paws that end in red three point claws, and light blue eyes. A thicker black tuft of fur covers its chest and extends outward from its shoulders. Various shades of red marking meanwhile surround its mouth, eyes, and nostrils. In addition, Zoroark features a large red mane that flows behind it, with black tips protruding from the mane and held together by a blue bead towards the tip. According to Ken Sugimori in an interview with Nintendo Dream, Zoroark's mane is a key aspect of its visual design, and is meant to accommodate the lack of a tail. In production art, the developers made a note to have Zoroark always leaning forward, and to give it a thin body shape to help differentiate it from Lucario, a previously introduced bipedal Pokémon.

The Hisuian variation is very similar to the base design but with different coloration, depicted with white fur and grey claws, yellow eyes, and the addition of red sores on its arms and legs. Meanwhile the central tuft of fur appears red in the center before switching to white at both ends, while its now disheveled mane is white with red tips. The design shift reflects how Zorua and Zoroark were driven from their warmer climate by humans fearful of their Illusion ability. As a result they died in the colder climate, only to revive as ghosts with an intense hatred of humans.

== Appearances ==
Zoroark's video game debut came in the 2010 game Pokémon Black and White. In these games, Zoroark is not able to be captured, and can only be obtained via real-world events. Zoroark could be obtained in the games' sequels, Pokémon Black 2 and White 2, by evolving a Zorua given to the player as a gift. Zoroark made appearances in subsequent series entries, including Pokémon Ultra Sun and Ultra Moon, Pokémon Sword and Shield, and Pokémon Scarlet and Violet. In the latter games, Zoroark is able to disguise itself as other Pokémon in the wild using its illusions. Zoroark appears in Pokémon Legends: Arceus, where a new form of Zoroark, named Hisuian Zoroark, appears. This form later reappeared in the games Pokémon Scarlet and Violet.

Zoroark has appeared in spin-off material for the series. Zoroark appears in Pokémon Go, where its pre-evolution Zorua must be captured in the wild, where it is disguised as the player's active partner Pokémon. Zorua can be evolved into Zoroark. Due to Zoroark's unique ability, Pokémon Go developer Niantic delayed adding it and Zorua to the game. Director Michael Steranka stated they "really wanted to do right by them" to ensure that characters like Zoroark felt special in the game. Zoroark appears in the multiplayer online battle arena game Pokémon Unite as a playable character, and also appears in other spin-offs such as Pokémon Rumble U and Pokémon Masters EX. Both the Unovan and Hisuian versions of Zoroark appear in the Pokémon Trading Card Game. It also appears as one of the Pokémon that can be summoned with the Pokéball item in the crossover fighting game series Super Smash Bros.

Zoroark appeared in the 13th Pokémon anime movie, titled Pokémon—Zoroark: Master of Illusions, voiced by Romi Park. During development of the movie, the production team wanted to feature a Dark-type Pokémon. Zoroark was in the basic development stages at this time, and Sugimori felt it would be a perfect fit for the film. The studio agreed, integrating both it and Zorua into the movie. In the film, Zoroark is captured by businessman Grings Kodai, who films Zoroark's illusions and edits them to make it appear as though Zoroark is causing real damage to a city, forcing an evacuation. With no one around, Kodai is free to harness a ripple in time, which will give him powers of foresight. Zoroark eventually breaks free of Kodai's control with Zorua's help, and is able to use its illusions to trick Kodai long enough for the time ripple to dissipate. Zoroark eventually tricks Kodai into being trapped in a sports stadium, leading to his arrest. In the film's manga adaptation, Zoroark's illusions cause Kodai to fall to his death.

In the Pokémon anime, the character Gladion uses a Zoroark when facing protagonist Ash Ketchum in a championship battle. A Hisuian Zoroark meanwhile appears in the first episode of Pokémon: Hisuian Snow, an miniseries anime tie-in for the Arceus game. In these appearances, Zoroark is voiced by Ryota Iwasaki.

== Promotion and merchandise ==
To promote Zoroark, it was first introduced via silhouette on the Japanese television program Pokémon Sunday. Game Freak announced it would be fully revealed on February 11, 2010, only for the magazine CoroCoro Comic to reveal Zoroark and its role in its upcoming film debut early. A later article in Nintendo Dream went into more detail, explaining how its Illusion ability worked. Following the announcement of the new Pokémon, Takara Tomy released stuffed toys and vinyl figures of Zoroark. In 2011, The Pokémon Company announced that September of that year would be dubbed "Zoroark Month," with various promotions themed after the Pokémon being held throughout the month, including merchandise distributions and giveaways.

During its early reveal, Michael Grimm of GamesRadar+ questioned the amount of push Zoroark appeared to receive from Nintendo. Fellow staff member Carolyn Gudmundson compared it to how the company had approached Lucario's debut, in that Game Freak treated them as not Legendary Pokémon but still promoted them as such. She also noted that, in Black and White, Zoroark was handled like event-exclusive Pokémon, as players needed special, previously distributed Pokémon to encounter it.

To promote Hisuian Zoroark, the Pokémon Company released a trailer for Pokémon Legends: Arceus, highlighting its abilities and lore alongside Hisuian Zorua. They later launched a 7-inch-tall statue featuring both Pokémon, available through the company's official store.

== Critical reception ==
Zoroark has been well received since its debut. Kevin Slackie and Moises Taveras of Paste praised it as one of the best Pokémon in the franchise, stating that while preceding Pokémon Ditto had a similar transform ability, Zoroark turned it into "an art form" due to how it impacted the competitive gaming community for the series. O'Dell Harmon of Game Informer praised it as "one of the premier monsters" introduced in Black and White, stating it "deserves so much respect is not only due to its great battle skill and cool design" but also for the strategic element its ability brought to the game. Zack Zwienen of Kotaku praised its illusion abilities, calling them "creepy and powerful" yet often overlooked by the fan community and franchise alike. He additionally noted that the character was particularly popular among artists in the furry community, resulting in a large amount not safe for work imagery of the character appearing in search engine results.

Robert Grosso of TechRaptor called it the "de-facto mascot" of the Black and White generation of Pokémon titles, sharing GamesRadar+'s comparison to Lucario due to its manner of introduction and its role as an event-exclusive Pokémon in those games. He stated that while the film itself was a darker tone than others, Zoroark gave a "mischievous impression" in the process. In terms of design, he found it simple but still having a "sinister edge" shared with many others introduced in Black and White. He felt its color scheme, slender body and fox-like features gave it "a dark yet playful presence", and that its illusion ability not only played well into what he perceived as kitsune design inspirations but also "plays into the trickster nature of Zoroark" in regards to its performance during gameplay. Carlos Naranjo Bejarano in the book Japón y "Occidente" also noted the kitsune aspects, but additionally cited a resemblance to depictions of werewolves. Meanwhile, he felt its facial markings seemed inspired by Japanese theatre, particular Noh and Kabuki.

Its Hisuian counterpart also received praise. Paste's Hana Kim called it one of the best forms introduced in Pokémon Legends: Arceus, stating that the "pale and ghostly" appearance coupled with a flowing mane in contrast to its standard form helped give it "a much more intimidating and interesting shape." She further praised how the resemblance of its face to a kistune mask helped tie it closer to Japanese folklore. David Caballero of Screen Rant meanwhile described Zoroark as one of the "coolest-looking Pokémon in the franchise" and one he observed everyone appeared to like, but felt its Hisuian form was an unexpected improvement on the original. Calling it "equal parts haunting and impressive", Caballero stated not only was its typing something fans had been keen to see in the franchise for some time, but that its appearance reflected both aspects commonly associated with Ghost-type Pokémon and its original Dark-type categorization.

Kenneth Shepard in an article for Kotaku discussed how Hisuian Zoroark related to Arceus' themes of colonization and its effect on wildlife in a region, calling the Pokémon's backstory one of the most haunting examples of the concept and an "echo of souls lost in humanity's expansion". He further describe it as one of game's "most damning pieces of commentary on the way Pokémon are affected by human's perception of what they're 'supposed' to be" and shined light on some of the darker aspects of the franchise despite its core concepts of friendship and teamwork.
