= Dinos (disambiguation) =

A dinos is an ancient Greek mixing bowl or cauldron. It may also refer to:

== People ==
- Dinos Angelidis (born 1969), Greek basketball player of mixed Greek-Austrian descent
- Dinos Chapman (born 1962), British visual artist, often known with his brother Jake as the Chapman Brothers
- Dinos Christianopoulos (1931–2020), Greek contemporary and post-war poet, novelist, folklorist, editor and researcher
- Dinos Dimopoulos (1921–2003), Greek actor, film director, screenwriter and theatre director
- Dinos Kouis (born 1955), Greek footballer
- Dinos Lefkaritis (born 1995), Cypriot alpine skier
- Dinos Mitoglou (born 1996), Greek basketball player
- Dinos (rapper), stage name of French rapper Jules Jomby (born 1993)

== Sports teams ==
- Calgary Dinos, the athletic teams that represent the University of Calgary in Calgary, Alberta, Canada
- Dinos Saltillo, an American football team based in Saltillo, Mexico
- Jeonbuk Dinos, original name of Jeonbuk Hyundai Motors, a professional football club based in Jeollabuk-do, South Korea
- NC Dinos, a South Korean baseball team
- Yulon Luxgen Dinos, a Taiwanese basketball team

== See also ==
- Dino (disambiguation)
- Dinosaur
- Dinos Painter, an Attic red-figure vase painter who was active during the second half of the 5th century BC
- Mr Dinos (foaled 14 April 1999), Irish-bred, British-trained Thoroughbred racehorse and sire
- Selena y Los Dinos, American Tejano band
