= Dyno =

Dyno may refer to:

- Dyno (company), an emergency drainage and plumbing company
- Dyno (climbing), a technique used in climbing
- Dyno – short name for dynamometer – a device for measuring force, torque, or power
- Dyno, an application container on the cloud platform Heroku

== See also ==
- Dino (disambiguation)
- Deno (disambiguation)
