= Harunobu Deno =

Japanese fencer

Personal information
- Born: 28 August 1969 (age 56)

Sport
- Sport: Fencing

Harunobu Deno (出野 晴信, Deno Harunobu) (born 28 August 1969) is a Japanese fencer. He competed in the team foil event at the 1988 Summer Olympics.
