= Ganzavia GAK-22 Dinó =

GAK-22 Dinó

General information
- Type: Utility aircraft
- National origin: Hungary
- Manufacturer: Ganz-Avia
- Designer: Kovács Gyula
- Number built: 1

History
- First flight: 1993

The Ganzavia GAK-22 Dinó was an unusual light utility aircraft built in Hungary in the early 1990s. The craft was designed in the 1980s and was displayed in model form at the 1987 Paris Air Show.

In configuration, it was a biplane with cantilever wings and a very pronounced negative stagger, making it almost a tandem wing design. The pilot and a single passenger sat side by side under an expansive bubble canopy, and it had a fixed tricycle undercarriage. The fuselage was of welded steel tube construction, and the wings of duralumin, with the whole aircraft skinned in fabric, other than the forward fuselage which had aluminium skin. A single prototype flew in 1993, but the project was abandoned by the mid-1990s, with the aircraft itself placed in the Transport Museum of Budapest (Közlekedési Múzeum).

== Specifications ==
Data from Jane's All the World's Aircraft 1995–96

General characteristics

- Crew: one pilot
- Capacity: one passenger
- Length: 6.10 m (20 ft 0 in)
- Wingspan: 7.70 m (25 ft 3 in)
- Height: 2.60 m (8 ft 6 in)
- Wing area: 14.04 m^{2} (151.1 sq ft)
- Aspect ratio: 4.22:1
- Empty weight: 430 kg (948 lb)
- Max takeoff weight: 720 kg (1,587 lb)
- Fuel capacity: 80 L (21 US gal; 18 imp gal)
- Powerplant: 1 × Lycoming O-235-H2C four-cylinder horizontally opposed air-cooled piston engine , 86 kW (115 hp)
- Propellers: 2-bladed Mühlbauer fixed-pitch propeller, 1.80 m (5 ft 11 in) diameter

Performance

- Maximum speed: 195 km/h (121 mph, 105 kn)
- Cruise speed: 175 km/h (109 mph, 94 kn) (econ cruise)
- Stall speed: 80 km/h (50 mph, 43 kn) (Power off)
- Never exceed speed: 250 km/h (160 mph, 130 kn)
- Range: 700 km (430 mi, 380 nmi)
- Service ceiling: 3,200 m (10,500 ft)

== See also ==
- Ganz Works
