= Denno (disambiguation) =

Denno is a comune in Trentino, Italy.

Denno may also refer to:

== Law ==
- Stovall v. Denno, a 1967 United States Supreme Court case

== People ==
- Dale Denno (1950–2019), American politician
- Deborah Denno (born 1952), American legal scholar
- Robert Denno (1945–2008), American insect ecologist

== Television ==
- Dennō Bōkenki Webdiver, Japanese mecha anime series
- Dennō Coil, Japanese science fiction anime series
- Dennō Senshi Porygon, episode of the first season of the Pokémon! series

== See also ==
- Deno (disambiguation)
- Cyberteam in Akihabara, a Japanese science fiction anime series also known as Akihabara Dennō Gumi
- Dennos Museum Center, a fine art museum in Traverse City, Michigan
