= Pokémon the Movie: Volcanion and the Mechanical Marvel =

2016 film by Kunihiko Yuyama

- Theatrical release poster

Japanese name
- Kanji: ポケモン・ザ・ムービーXY&Z ボルケニオンと機巧のマギアナ
- Literal meaning: Pokémon the Movie XY&Z: Volcanion and the Exquisite Magearna
Transcriptions
- Revised Hepburn: Pokemon Za Mūbī Ekkusu Wai ando Zetto Borukenion to Karakuri no Magiana
- Directed by: Kunihiko Yuyama
- Screenplay by: Atsuhiro Tomioka
- Based on: Pokémon X and Y by: Satoshi Tajiri; Junichi Masuda; Ken Sugimori
- Produced by: Satoshi Shimodaira; Susumu Matsuyama; Kenichi Arai
- Starring: see below
- Cinematography: Aya Aoshima
- Edited by: Toshio Henmi
- Music by: Shinji Miyazaki
- Production companies: OLM, Inc.; OLM Digital
- Distributed by: Toho
- Release date: July 16, 2016 (Japan)
- Running time: 95 minutes
- Country: Japan
- Language: Japanese
- Box office: Japan: ¥2.15 billion ($20.2 million); Overseas: $5,871,077

Pokémon the Movie: Volcanion and the Mechanical Marvel, known in Japan as Pokémon the Movie XY&Z: Volcanion and the Exquisite Magearna (ポケモン・ザ・ムービーXY&Z ボルケニオンと機巧のマギアナ, Pokemon Za Mūbī Ekkusu Wai ando Zetto Borukenion to Karakuri no Magiana) is a 2016 Japanese animated fantasy adventure film produced by OLM. It is the nineteenth film of the Pokémon anime series and the third and final film of Pokémon the Series: XY. It was directed by Kunihiko Yuyama and written by Atsuhiro Tomioka. The film stars the voices of Rica Matsumoto, Ikue Ōtani, Mayuki Makiguchi, Yūki Kaji, Mariya Ise, Megumi Hayashibara, Shin-ichiro Miki, Inuko Inuyama, Somegoro Ichikawa, Yuka Terasaki, Kōichi Yamadera, Mayu Matsuoka, and Shoko Nakagawa. The film focuses on Councillor Alva of the Azoth Kingdom, who steals the "Soul-Heart" of the artificial Pokémon Magearna to power and control a flying fortress in the kingdom. The Mythical Pokémon Volcanion allies with the Pokémon Trainer Ash Ketchum and his friends, Pikachu, Serena, Clemont, and Bonnie to recover Magearna's Soul-Heart.

It was released in Japan on July 16, 2016. An English dub was produced by DuArt Media Services, and stars the voices of Sarah Natochenny, Haven Paschall, Michael Liscio Jr., Alyson Leigh Rosenfeld, Michele Knotz, Carter Cathcart, Mike Pollock, Billy Bob Thompson, Riley Joseph, and Laurie Hymes. It premiered in the United States on Disney XD on December 5, 2016, and in the United Kingdom on CITV on November 19, 2016.

== Plot ==
Mega Evolution Councillor Alva and Prince Raleigh of the Azoth Kingdom order the artificial Pokémon Magearna to be brought to the Kingdom after it is found in the Nebel Plateau, a place populated by Pokémon who have been abused by humans. The Mythical Pokémon Volcanion tries recovering Magearna, but has a band attached to his leg and is sent falling to a forest where Ash Ketchum and his friends, Pikachu, Serena, Clemont, and Bonnie are camping. Volcanion lands in Ash and friends' vicinity and, when they recover, Ash finds a second band attached to himself. Clemont discovers the bands emit an electromagnetic force that binds Ash to Volcanion like a chain. Volcanion runs off, dragging Ash along with him.

Ash and Volcanion recover Magearna from the Azoth Kingdom. They rendezvous with Serena, Clemont, and Bonnie, who are fascinated by Magearna, but are unable to remove the chain binding Ash and Volcanion. Reluctantly, Volcanion allows the group to accompany him and Magearna to their home, Nebel Plateau. On the way, they are attacked by Team Rocket, who have been hired by Alva to recover Magearna, but the group is able to drive them off with help from Raleigh's sister, Princess Kimia. During their stay at Nebel Plateau, Clemont and Kimia have the resident Pokémon break the electromagnetic bands. Finally free, Volcanion orders the humans to leave, but they refuse.

The next day, Alva and his underlings, Levi and Cherie, attack and recapture Magearna. He removes Magearna's "Soul-Heart", which he plans to use to activate a mechanism in the Azoth Castle that turns it into a flying fortress. Raleigh tries to stop him, but is knocked unconscious. As the castle takes to the skies, Ash and Pikachu storm the fortress with Volcanion, Kimia, and Greninja, but are trapped by Alva, who attempts to break Magearna's spirit by firing at Nebel Plateau. However, the resident Pokémon repel the attack with help from Squishy the Zygarde Core, and Ash destroys Alva's cane giving him control over the Pokémon, causing them to become normal again, and Alakazam uses psychic powers to levitate itself and the other Pokémon, as well as Levi and Cherie, from the fortress.

Volcanion frees himself, Ash, Kimia, and their Pokémon. Alva sets the fortress on a collision course with the plateau and tries to escape with a jetpack, but Greninja (in his Ash-Greninja form) disables it, causing him to fall. Ash returns the Soul-Heart to Magearna, but her spirit is gone. To prevent the fortress from crashing into the plateau, Volcanion uses his power to destroy the fortress with himself at the center of the blast. Volcanion is assumed to be killed in the blast, bringing grief to the humans and Pokémon, but later, at Nebel Plateau, Magearna regains her spirit when Volcanion appears, having survived, but he falls unconscious, so Magearna revives Volcanion, as her flowers earlier made him sneeze. When he regains consciousness, Volcanion tells Magearna not to put pollen to his nostrils, then gives Pikachu and the other Pokémon the distinction of being honorary members of Nebel Plateau. Team Rocket, watching from nearby, express satisfaction at how things turned out.

In the credits, the Nebel Plateau Pokémon gather the wreckage of the fortress and bury it in a huge hole Volcanion had made earlier. Ash and his friends return to the Azoth Kingdom with Kimia and Raleigh, where Bonnie proposes to Kimia's personal assistant, Flamel, on Clemont's behalf, then he pulls her back with his Aipom arm. Later, Kimia and her shiny Gardevoir discover Alva tangled in the wreckage of his jetpack in a tree. Gardevoir levitates him onto Kimia's aircraft, where he gets the magnetic bands stuck on him, keeping him from fleeing, even though he attempts to; Levi and Cherie are also imprisoned. Taking Ash's advice, Raleigh goes out on a Pokémon journey of his own with his Slurpuff in order to see the world and learn more than just past history. Kimia watches him leave from what remains of the castle. Magearna continues to live in peace at Nebel Plateau with the other Pokémon, while Volcanion watches over them from his cave.

== Cast ==
Character	Voice actor (Japanese)	Voice actor (English)
Ash Ketchum	Rica Matsumoto	Sarah Natochenny
Pikachu	Ikue Ōtani	Ikue Ōtani
Serena	Mayuki Makiguchi	Haven Paschall
Clemont	Yūki Kaji	Michael Liscio Jr.
Bonnie	Mariya Ise	Alyson Leigh Rosenfeld
Jessie	Megumi Hayashibara	Michele Knotz
James	Shin-ichiro Miki	Carter Cathcart
Meowth	Inuko Inuyama	Carter Cathcart
Narrator	Unshō Ishizuka	Rodger Parsons

Guest characters:

- Volcanion is the Steam Pokémon, who watches over the Nebel Plateau and is distrustful of humans, especially Ash and his friends. He is voiced by Somegoro Ichikawa in Japanese and Mike Pollock in English.
- Magearna is an artificial Pokémon created in the Azoth Kingdom, which she fled to prevent misuse of her power. She is Volcanion's best friend. She is voiced by Yuka Terasaki.
- Alva is a sadistic councilor of the Azoth Kingdom and the main antagonist, who desires the power of Magearna's "Soul-Heart" for his own ends. His main Pokémon is a Shiny Gengar, who can Mega Evolve. He is voiced by Kōichi Yamadera in Japanese and Billy Bob Thompson in English. In the English dub trailer, he was voiced by Sean Schemmel.
- Kimia is the Princess of the Azoth Kingdom, who prefers to look forward rather than behind. She is skilled with a variety of machinery. She is assisted by a Shiny Gardevoir, who can Mega Evolve. She is voiced by Mayu Matsuoka in Japanese and Riley Joseph in English.
- Raleigh is the Prince of the Azoth Kingdom and Kimia's younger brother. He is friendly and well-meaning. He is naive due to his fixation with history. He is accompanied by a Slurpuff. He is voiced by Shoko Nakagawa in Japanese (who also celebrated her tenth anniversary in the film series and the franchise) and Laurie Hymes in English.
- Dr. Nikola is a scientist of the Azoth Kingdom half a millennium in the past who created Magearna. He is the ancestor of Kimia and Raleigh. He is voiced by Tomomichi Nishimura in Japanese and Scottie Ray in English.
- Levi and Cherie are Alva's henchman and henchwoman, who control his Mega Evolved Pokémon army.
- Flamel is Kimia's personal assistant.

== Production ==
A teaser of the film was first revealed after the screening of Pokémon the Movie: Hoopa and the Clash of Ages in Japan. Its temporary title and featured Pokémon was later revealed in the January issue of the CoroCoro Comic on December 15, 2015. It was temporarily titled Pokémon the Movie XY&Z. In the March 2016 issue of the CoroCoro Comic, the 7th Generation Pokémon Magearna was revealed and announced as another one of its stars. As part of the promotions for the film, The Pokémon Company hosted a general election for fans to vote which of the 720 Pokémon is their favorite Pokémon, which ran from April 16, 2016, to May 8, 2016.

== Music ==
The movie's Japanese ending song is titled "Post ni koe o nageirete" (ポストに声を投げ入れて, Posuto ni koe o nageirete; lit. Mailing out My Voice) by YUKI. The movie's English ending song is titled "Soul-Heart" composed by Ed Goldfarb, and performed by Dani Marcus.

== Box office ==
This film ranked 4th on the Japanese box office grossing ¥323,901,600 ($3.09 million) in its first weekend on 366 screens with 289,971 admissions. On its third day of release (Marine day), it grossed a total of ¥475,547,600 ($4.6 million) with a total of 430,987 admissions. This film grossed the second lowest opening weekend in its film franchise. The film went on to gross ¥2.15 billion in Japan.

Overseas, the film grossed $3,857,383 in China, ₩2,148,082,300 ($1,851,103) in South Korea, and HK$1.26 million (US$161,679) in Hong Kong, for an overseas total of $5,871,077.
