= Pokémon the Movie: Hoopa and the Clash of Ages =

2015 Pokémon film directed by Kunihiko Yuyama

- Theatrical release poster

Japanese name
- Kanji: ポケモン・ザ・ムービーXY 光輪(リング)の超魔神 フーパ
- Literal meaning: Pokémon the Movie XY: The Archdjinni of the Rings: Hoopa
Transcriptions
- Revised Hepburn: Pokemon Za Mūbī Ekkusu Wai Ringu no Chōmajin Fūpa
- Directed by: Kunihiko Yuyama
- Screenplay by: Atsuhiro Tomioka
- Based on: Pokémon by: Satoshi Tajiri; Ken Sugimori; Junichi Masuda
- Produced by: Junya Okamoto; Kenichi Arai; Satoshi Shimodaira; Susumu Matsuyama
- Starring: see below
- Cinematography: Tatsumi Yukiwaki
- Edited by: Toshio Henmi
- Music by: Shinji Miyazaki
- Production companies: OLM, Inc. OLM Digital
- Distributed by: Toho
- Release date: July 18, 2015 (Japan)
- Running time: 78 minutes
- Country: Japan
- Language: Japanese
- Box office: Japan: ¥2.61 billion ($22 million)

Pokémon the Movie: Hoopa and the Clash of Ages, known in Japan as Pokémon the Movie XY: The Archdjinni of the Rings: Hoopa (ポケモン・ザ・ムービーXY 光輪(リング)の超魔神 フーパ, Pokemon Za Mūbī Ekkusu Wai Ringu no Chōmajin Fūpa) is a 2015 Japanese anime adventure film created by Satoshi Tajiri. It is the eighteenth film of the Pokémon anime series and the second film of Pokémon the Series: XY. It was directed by Kunihiko Yuyama, written by Atsuhiro Tomioka and produced by OLM. The film stars the voices of Rica Matsumoto, Ikue Ōtani, Mayuki Makiguchi, Yūki Kaji, Mariya Ise, Megumi Hayashibara, Shin-ichiro Miki, Inuko Inuyama, Rie Kugimiya, Kōichi Yamadera, and Shoko Nakagawa. In the film, Hoopa, a Pokémon able to summon people and other Pokémon, splits into two forms: the real Hoopa, and a shadow created after Hoopa's powers were sealed for 100 years. Hoopa's shadow attempts to control the form of the real Hoopa.

The film was released in Japan on July 18, 2015. An English dub was produced by DuArt Film and Video, and stars the voices of Sarah Natochenny, Haven Paschall, Michael Liscio Jr, Alyson Leigh Rosenfeld, Michele Knotz, Carter Cathcart, Lori Phillips, Ryan William Downey, and Emily Woo Zeller. It premiered in theaters in Australia on November 5, 2015, and aired in Canada on Teletoon on November 14, 2015, in the United Kingdom on CITV on December 12, 2015, and in the United States on Cartoon Network on December 19, 2015.

== Plot ==
One hundred years ago, the power of the Pokémon Hoopa was confined inside the Prison Bottle after it became destructive and out of control. In the present, Ash Ketchum and his friends, Pikachu, Serena, Clemont, and Bonnie are pulled through a portal created by Hoopa's interdimensional rings to Dahara City. Hoopa attempts to use its rings to transport everybody to the nearby Dahara Tower but it is revealed that, in its altered state, Hoopa cannot travel through the rings it creates. Baraz, one of Hoopa's caretakers and the great grandson of the man who sealed off Hoopa's power, arrives with the Prison Bottle. The bottle possesses Baraz and makes him release a shadow of Hoopa created from the anger of being confined for 100 years. Hoopa's power is put back into the bottle.

Team Rocket tries stealing the bottle, and the instant Meowth takes hold of it, he becomes possessed, and opens the bottle to unleash Hoopa's power. Hoopa fights the power and is able to keep it at bay, but Hoopa's shadow then develops as a separate Pokémon, which attempts to take over the real Hoopa. In the struggles, the Prison Bottle explodes. Hoopa summons the Legendary Pokémon Lugia, who distracts Hoopa's shadow as Hoopa makes its escape. Baraz and his sister Meray know that they can make a new bottle at Dahara Tower with the power of earth, fire, and water, deciding to use Serena's Braixen, Ash's Frogadier, and a wild Hippopotas from the desert.

Lugia meanwhile, gains the upper hand in its duel with Hoopa's shadow which ends the conflict by tricking Lugia into flying through a ring which returns Lugia back to its ocean home. Hoopa then summons the Legendary Pokémon Latias, Latios, and Rayquaza. Ash, Hoopa, and Pikachu ride on Latias and Latios, while Rayquaza helps to battle Hoopa's shadow. Ash commands the Pokémon to attack, but Hoopa's shadow summons Groudon, Kyogre, Dialga, Palkia, Giratina and Kyurem. Meanwhile, at the tower, the others are working to make a new Prison Bottle, using the powers of fire, earth, and water.

Rayquaza creates a twister around Dahara Tower to protect it, while the others inside reforge the Prison Bottle. However, Hoopa's shadow and the Legendary Pokémon break through it. The bottle is made again, but Baraz drops it; Ash catches it but gets possessed. Hoopa cleanses the shadow of itself with its happy memories, causing the evil to disappear. However, due to too many legendary Pokémon being summoned, a time warp forms around the tower. Hoopa, its fully restored powers no longer affected by anger, helps everyone inside the tower escape with its rings, but Hoopa cannot pass through the rings. Just then, the space-time rift stops; Arceus stops it with its power, giving Hoopa one more chance to escape. Hoopa escapes, remembering the words of Baraz and Meray's great grandfather that originally confined Hoopa's power, and considers Baraz and Meray family. Hoopa decides to stay with them, and is finally able to travel through the ring. Hoopa decides to rebuild the city before returning to its home in the Arche Valley.

== Cast ==
=== Regular characters ===
Character	Voice actor (Japanese)	Voice actor (English)
Ash Ketchum	Rica Matsumoto	Sarah Natochenny
Pikachu	Ikue Ōtani	Ikue Ōtani
Serena	Mayuki Makiguchi	Haven Paschall
Clemont	Yūki Kaji	Michael Liscio Jr
Bonnie	Mariya Ise	Alyson Leigh Rosenfeld
Jessie	Megumi Hayashibara	Michele Knotz
James	Shin-ichiro Miki	Carter Cathcart
Meowth	Inuko Inuyama	Carter Cathcart
Wobbuffet	Yūji Ueda	Kayzie Rogers
Dedenne	Megumi Sato	Megumi Sato
Narrator	Unshō Ishizuka	Rodger Parsons

=== Guest characters ===
- Hoopa (フーパ, Hūpa): Known as the Mischief and the Mythical Pokémon. In the original Japanese, Rie Kugimiya voices Hoopa's Confined form. Kōichi Yamadera voices Hoopa's Unbound form. In the English dub, Lori Phillips voices Hoopa's Confined form. Ryan William Downey voices Hoopa's Unbound form.
- Baraz (バルザ, Baruza): The older brother of Meray who tries to make Hoopa unbound. In the original Japanese, Tatsuya Fujiwara voices Baraz. In the English dub, Daniel J. Edwards voices Baraz.
- Meray (メアリ, Meari): The younger sister of Baraz who also takes care of Hoopa. In the original Japanese, Shoko Nakagawa voices Meray. In the English dub, Emily Woo Zeller voices Meray.

== Music ==
The Japanese ending theme song is "Tweedia" composed by Kenji Tamai and Masahiro Tobinai, and performed by Rei Yasuda. The English ending theme song is "Every Side of Me" composed by Ed Goldfarb, and performed by Dani Marcus.

== Production ==
As the 18th film in the Pokémon series, its production began as soon as production of the 17th installment ended. Based on the sixth generation of Pokémon video games, it is based around the legendary Pokémon known as Hoopa.

== Reception ==
=== Critical response ===
The film received poor reviews from critics. Brian Costello of Common Sense Media gave the film two stars out of five and that the film has a confusing plot with annoying voices and that it's for die-hard fans only.

=== Box office ===
The movie grossed ¥2,610,000,000 in Japan. It is one of the lowest-grossing Pokémon movies, performing slightly better than lowest-grossing film, Pokémon Heroes.

== Release ==
=== Home media ===
The movie was released on DVD and Blu-ray in Japan on December 16, 2015, by SMD Itaku. In the US, Viz Media released the movie on DVD on March 8, 2016. In the UK, the movie was released on DVD and Blu-ray by Manga Entertainment.
