= Mayuki Makiguchi =

Japanese voice actress (born 1984)

- 牧口 真幸
- Born: December 9, 1984 (age 41); Aichi Prefecture, Japan
- Occupation: Voice actress
- Years active: 2005–present
- Notable credit: Pokémon X and Y as Serena
- Website: ameblo.jp/makimayu1209

Mayuki Makiguchi (牧口 真幸, Makiguchi Mayuki; born December 9, 1984) is a Japanese voice actress signed to 81 Produce.

== Voice roles ==
=== Anime ===
2006

- Zenmai Zamurai as Townsperson

2007

- Sore Ike! Anpanman as Knot-chan
- Bamboo Blade as Schoolgirl
- Mega Man Star Force as MC

2008

- Aria as underclassman B
- Gintama as Maguko
- Golgo 13 as Mario's daughter, secretary
- Scarecrowman: The Animation as Boy
- Antique Bakery as customer C
- Zenryoku Usagi
- Soul Eater as Mizune, Risa, Gaya, student A, woman A
- XxxHolic: Kei as Schoolgirl A, Schoolgirl B
- Miracle! Mikika as Akari Oshiushi
- Major as Hisaya's fan
- Rosario + Vampire as Schoolgirl

2009

- Kimi ni Todoke as Eriko Hirano
- Genji Monogatari Sennenki as wife C, woman C
- Whispered Words as Azusa Aoi
- Shin Mazinger Shougeki! Z Hen as Roll
- Zettai Karen Children as Student
- Sore Ike! Anpanman as Kuma Dai, Croissant Princess
- Duel Masters as Sky, child B, girl C, Announcement
- Pandora Hearts as Schoolgirl
- Beyblade: Metal Fusion as Lina Mekoyama, Boy 2, Audience A

2010

- Maid Sama! as Boy A
- The World God Only Knows as Izumi Ishikiri
- K-On! as Student council treasurer
- Keshikasu-kun as Minako
- Romance of the Three Kingdoms (2009 animation)
- Tatakau Shisho as Rati
- Tegami Bachi Reverse as Hospitalized girl
- Duel Masters as child B, Girl, Chai
- Naruto Shippuden as Tanishi
- Bakuman as Female Announcer
- Fortune Arterial as Girl

2011

- A Channel as Child
- Metal Fight Beyblade 4D as Yuki Mizusawa
- Cardfight!! Vanguard as Maron, Yuri Usui, World Tree
- The World God Only Knows II as Schoolgirl, Kikki, Alumni, Announcer, Weather forecaster, Meruko
- Kimi ni Todoke (2nd season) as Eriko Hirano
- Sket Dance as Yukino
- The Mystic Archives of Dantalian as Boy D
- Bakuman
- Hyouge Mono as Concubine, Wife
- Pocket Monsters Diamond & Pearl the Movie - Giratina and the Sky's Bouquet: Shaymin as Taka
- Sasameki Koto as Azusa Aoi

2012

- Cardfight Vanguard: Asia Circuit as Yuri Usui
- Zoobles! as Harry, Earl
- Hiiro no Kakera

2013

- Cardfight Vanguard: Asia Circuit as Yuri Usui, Queen Y
- Robocar Poli as Helly
- Pocket Monsters XY as Serena

2014

- Pokémon the Movie XY: The Cocoon of Destruction and Diancie as Serena

2015

- Pocket Monsters: XY&Z as Serena
- Pokémon the Movie XY - The Archdjinni of the Rings: Hoopa as Serena
- Go! Princess PreCure as Karin Akeboshi

2016

- Age 12: A Little Heart-Pounding as Marin Ogura
- Pokémon the Movie XY&Z: Volcanion and the Exquisite Magearna as Serena

2018

- Puzzle & Dragons as Mizuki Okumura

2020

- Drifting Dragons as Waitress

2022

- Pokémon Master Journeys as Serena

=== Dubbing ===
- Adventure Time as additional voices
- Kung Fu Panda: Legends of Awesomeness as Mei Li and Lian
