= Pokémon (TV series) =

Japanese anime television series

- Japanese: ポケットモンスター
- Literally: Pocket Monsters
- Genre: Adventure; Fantasy comedy
- Based on: Pokémon by Satoshi Tajiri
- Developed by: Takeshi Shudo (1997–2002); Junki Takegami (2002–2006); Atsuhiro Tomioka (2006–2016, 2023); Aya Matsui (2016–2019); Shōji Yonemura (2019–2022); Dai Sato (2023–present)
- Directed by: Kunihiko Yuyama (1997–2019, 2023); Daiki Tomiyasu (2019–present)
- Voices of: Rica Matsumoto; Ikue Ōtani; Megumi Hayashibara; Shin-ichiro Miki; Inuko Inuyama; Minori Suzuki; Yuka Terasaki
- Music by: Shinji Miyazaki (1997–2019); Yuki Hayashi (2019–2023); Conisch (2023–present)
- Country of origin: Japan
- Original language: Japanese
- No. of episodes: 1,392 (list of episodes)

Production
- Animators: OLM Team Ota (1997–2006); OLM Team Iguchi (2006–2009); OLM Team Kato (2010–2024); OLM Team Kumemura (2024–present)
- Running time: 22 minutes
- Production companies: TV Tokyo; TV Tokyo Medianet; ShoPro

Original release
- Network: TXN (TV Tokyo)
- Release: April 1, 1997 – present

Pokémon, (Note: Japanese: ポケモン, Hepburn: Pokemon) abbreviated from the Japanese title of Pocket Monsters, (Note: Japanese: ポケットモンスター, Hepburn: Poketto Monsutā) and branded in English as Pokémon the Series (Note: Japanese: テレビアニメ「ポケットモンスター」シリーズ, Hepburn: Terebi Anime 'Poketto Monsutā' Shirīzu; "TV Anime 'Pocket Monsters' Series") and Pokémon Horizons: The Series, is a Japanese anime television series, part of The Pokémon Company's Pokémon media franchise, which premiered on TV Tokyo in April 1997.

The anime franchise consists of eight sequential series in Japan, each based on a main installment of the Pokémon video game series. In the international broadcasts, these series are split across 29 seasons. The show originally followed Ash Ketchum, a young trainer of fictional creatures called Pokémon. Joined by his partner Pokémon Pikachu and a rotating cast of human characters, Ash goes on a journey to become a "Pokémon Master", traveling through the various regions of the Pokémon world and competing in various Pokémon-battling tournaments known as the Pokémon League. Starting with the 26th season, a new cast is featured, centering on protagonists Liko and Roy.

The anime series is accompanied by spin-off programming, including Pokémon Chronicles, a series of side stories, and live-action variety and Pokémon-related news shows, such as Pocket Monsters Encore, Weekly Pokémon Broadcasting Station, Pokémon Sunday, Pokémon Smash!, Pokémon Get TV, Meet Up at the Pokémon House? and Where Are We Going with Pokémon!?

The Pokémon television series played a major role in increasing anime's worldwide popularity, especially in the United States and Asia, where many Pokémon films are among the highest-grossing anime films. It is also regarded as one of the first anime series on television to reach such a level of mainstream success with Western and Asian audiences, as well as causing a surge in the game series's popularity and vice versa. Pokémon is regarded as the most successful video game adaptation of all time, with over 1,300 episodes broadcast and adapted for international television markets, having aired in 192 countries worldwide and being one of the most widely watched shows on Netflix by 2016.

== Plot ==
=== Pokémon the Series (1997–2023) ===
Pokémon the Series primarily follows Ash Ketchum, a young boy from Pallet Town who dreams of becoming a Pokémon Master. After receiving his first Pokémon, Pikachu, from Professor Oak, Ash embarks on a journey across various regions, including Kanto, Johto, Hoenn, Sinnoh, Unova, Kalos, Alola, and Galar, where he challenges Gym Leaders, competes in regional Pokémon Leagues, or other competitions, and meets a variety of companions who support him in his goal.

These companions include Misty, Brock, May, Dawn, Serena, Lillie, Goh, and others, each pursuing their own unique goals, such as becoming a top Pokémon Coordinator, becoming a skilled Pokémon Breeder, or seeking to catch Mew. Ash also forms rivalries with several recurring characters across the series, such as Gary, Paul, and Trip, many of whom he faces in League tournaments or other competitions. Ash and his friends frequently encounter the villainous Team Rocket members, Jessie, James, and Meowth, who persistently attempt to steal rare and powerful Pokémon throughout the series.

Over the course of his journey, Ash achieves several milestones, including becoming the first-ever Champion of the Alola League, where he also attended Pokémon School, and ultimately defeating Leon to become Monarch of the World Coronation Series. After reaching this peak, Ash continues his travels with Pikachu to meet and befriend new Pokémon in order to achieve his goal of becoming a Pokémon Master.

=== Pokémon Horizons: The Series (2023–present) ===
Pokémon Horizons: The Series follows Liko, a girl from the Paldea Region with a mysterious pendant, and Roy, a boy from Kanto with an ancient Poké Ball, as they join the Rising Volt Tacklers, a group of adventurers traveling the world. They learn their items are linked to the legendary adventurer Lucius and his six Pokémon, the "Six Heroes". While searching for them, Liko, Roy, and Dot briefly attend Naranja Academy to study the Terastal phenomenon. After encountering Lucius and fighting the villainous Explorers, following a one-year time skip, the group defeats and exposes the Explorers, destroys Laquium and clears the Rising Volt Tacklers' name.

== Characters ==
Ash Ketchum (サトシ, Satoshi)
Voiced by: Rica Matsumoto, Hana Takeda (young, JN001) (Japanese); Veronica Taylor (4Kids); Sarah Natochenny (TPCI) (English)
Ash Ketchum is the main protagonist of the series for the first twenty-five seasons. A 10-year-old Pokémon Trainer from Pallet Town in the Kanto Region, he travels with many traveling companions throughout the series. Ash's dream is to become a "Pokémon Master", and as a result often attempts to win the Pokémon League, a competition of the strongest Pokémon Trainers in whatever region he is in. Though his attempts are typically unsuccessful, he eventually succeeded in becoming the first Alola Regional Champion and later defeated Leon in the World Coronation Series Masters Eight Tournament to become the strongest Pokémon Trainer in the world and new World Champion, referred as "Monarch".
Jessie, James, and Meowth (ムサシ, コジロウ and ニャース, Musashi, Kojirō, and Nyāsu)
Jessie: Voiced by: Megumi Hayashibara (Japanese); Rachael Lillis (4Kids), Michele Knotz (TPCI) (English)
James: Voiced by: Shin-ichiro Miki (Japanese); Ted Lewis (up to and including episode 8; 4Kids), Eric Stuart (4Kids), James Carter Cathcart (TPCI, seasons 9–25) (English)
Meowth: Voiced by: Inuko Inuyama (Japanese); Matthew Sussman, Maddie Blaustein, James Carter Cathcart (TPCI, season 9–25) (English)
Jessie, James, and Meowth are a group of Team Rocket members. They act as one of the three primary antagonists of the anime series for the first twenty-five seasons, often coming into conflict with Ash Ketchum in an attempt to capture his Pikachu. They primarily act as comic relief, though they have also acted as serious antagonists on several occasions. Jessie owns a Wobbuffet, who is the source of a running gag where he pops out of his Poké Ball at the strangest times. James is a member of Team Rocket, who was part of a noble, rich family, but it was a life he desperately wanted to escape. Meowth is capable of communicating with human speech. His pursuit for Meowzie in particular chained off his ambitions to learn to speak and act human-like and ultimately his employment within Team Rocket, after failing to woo Meowzie. Meowth acts as a translator for Team Rocket and sometimes Ash and his friends, translating what another Pokémon is saying.
Misty (カスミ, Kasumi)
Voiced by: Mayumi Iizuka (Japanese); Rachael Lillis (4Kids), Michele Knotz (TPCI) (English)
Misty is a 10-year-old Water-type Pokémon Trainer and one of Ash's traveling companions who first appeared in Pokémon: Indigo League. She was one of the four Cerulean City Gym Leaders along with her three older sisters, and after the end of Pokémon: Master Quest, became the sole Cerulean City Gym Leader.
Brock (タケシ, Takeshi)
Voiced by: Yūji Ueda (Japanese); Eric Stuart (4Kids), Bill Rogers (TPCI) (English)
Brock is the 15-year-old former Pewter City Gym Leader and a ladies' man. In his earliest appearances, Brock has dreams of being the world's best Pokémon Breeder, though in later series he instead aspires to be a Pokémon Doctor. There is a running gag in the series where Brock falls in love with every girl he meets and is either pulled away by the ear by Misty or Max or is hit with his Croagunk's Poison Jab. Brock was a mainstay on the series for several seasons, eventually leaving at the end of the Diamond and Pearl series.
Tracey Sketchit (ケンジ, Kenji)
Voiced by: Tomokazu Seki (Japanese); Ted Lewis (4Kids, TPCI (current)), Craig Blair (TPCI, season 9) (English)
One of Ash's traveling companions in Orange Islands, Tracey Sketchit is a Pokémon Watcher, someone who studies Pokémon in the field similarly to bird watchers. He later accomplished his dream to become an assistant to Professor Oak after the end of Pokémon: Adventures in the Orange Islands.
May and Max (ハルカ and マサト, Haruka and Masato)
May: Voiced by: Kaori Suzuki (Japanese); Veronica Taylor (4Kids), Michele Knotz (TPCI) (English)
Max: Voiced by: Fushigi Yamada (Japanese); Amy Birnbaum (4Kids), Kayzie Rogers (TPCI) (English)
May is the daughter of the Petalburg City Gym Leader, Norman and the older sister of Max. She takes interest in Pokémon Contests, competitions focusing on a Pokémon's appearance or appeal. May later reappears in Pokémon the Series: Diamond and Pearl and Pokémon Journeys: The Series. Max is May's younger brother, who acts as one of the group's travelling companions in the Hoenn-associated series.
Dawn (ヒカリ, Hikari)
Voiced by: Megumi Toyoguchi (Japanese); Emily Bauer (English)
Dawn is a 10-year-old Pokémon Coordinator from Twinleaf Town who travels with Ash and Brock in the Sinnoh Region. Following in her mother's footsteps as a Pokémon Coordinator—a Trainer who partakes in Pokémon Contests—she chooses Piplup and sets out with the goal of becoming Top Coordinator.
Iris (アイリス, Airisu; Iris)
Voiced by: Aoi Yūki (Japanese); Eileen Stevens (first voice), Anairis Quiñones (second voice) (English)
One of Ash's companions in Black and White series. Iris hails from a village where Dragon-type Pokémon are a major focus. She notably travels with an Axew, which evolves into a Haxorus. She reappears in Pokémon Master Journeys: The Series, where she is revealed to have become the new Unova Regional Champion. She battles Cynthia in the World Coronation Series Masters Eight Tournament but loses.
Cilan (デント, Dento; Dent)
Voiced by: Mamoru Miyano (Japanese); Jason Griffith (English)
Cilan is a Pokémon Connoisseur who has the ability to determine the compatibility between Pokémon and their trainers. He travels with Ash in Black and White series. He is one of the Gym Leaders of the Unova Region, a position he shares with his brothers Chili and Cress, but he leaves his post to join Ash and Iris on their journey. He has numerous interests seen throughout the series such as fishing, cinema and subway trains. He has the Grass-type Pokémon Pansage as his partner. He also acts as a mentor figure to Ash and Iris.
Serena (セレナ, Serena)
Voiced by: Mayuki Makiguchi (Japanese); Haven Burton-Paschall (English)
Serena is a Pokémon Performer from Vaniville Town in the Kalos Region, who acts as one of Ash's travelling companions in Pokémon the Series: XY. She met Ash back when the two attended Professor Oak's Pokémon Summer Camp program, where Ash helped her back on her feet after hurting her leg. After seeing him on TV three years later, she decides to join him on his journey, as she has a big crush on him. She partakes in Pokémon Showcases (beauty pageant-like contests) in an attempt to become the "Kalos Queen", an honorary title for the best Pokémon Performer. At the end of the series, she prepares to compete in the Pokémon Contests that occur in Hoenn. Before parting, she gives Ash a kiss on the lips.
Clemont and Bonnie (シトロン and ユリーカ, Shitoron and Yurīka; Citron and Eureka)
Clemont: Voiced by: Yūki Kaji (Japanese); Michael Liscio Jr. (English)
Bonnie: Voiced by: Mariya Ise (ep. 803–887, 903–942), Mika Kanai (ep. 888–902) (Japanese); Alyson Leigh Rosenfeld (English)
Clemont is an Electric-type Gym Leader from Lumiose City. He is a young inventor and always has a large backpack that contains numerous strange gadgets, most of which explode. He travels with Ash during the XY series to become a better Gym Leader. This culminates when Ash challenges and successfully defeats Clemont at the Lumiose Gym, acquiring his fifth badge in Kalos.
Bonnie is Clemont's younger sister. Bonnie, due to her youth, cannot have a Pokémon yet, and thus has Clemont catch a Dedenne for her, which acts as her partner throughout the series. She later befriended one of Zygarde's cores, which she affectionately nicknamed "Squishy" and developed a close friendship with. A running gag involves her attempt to get other women to marry her brother, though Clemont often drags Bonnie away before it gets anywhere.
Lillie (リーリエ, Rīrie; Lillie)
Voiced by: Kei Shindō (Japanese); Laurie Hymes (English)
Lillie is one of the students at the Pokémon School of Melemele Island who befriends Ash in the Sun & Moon series. Hailing from a wealthy family, she loves to study and usually helps the other students with their research, but has an inherent fear of touching any kind of Pokémon due to an incident involving a Nihilego in her youth. She eventually overcomes her fears by the end of the series, and eventually travels the world to try and find her missing father, Mohn.
Kiawe (カキ, Kaki)
Voiced by: Kaito Ishikawa (Japanese); Marc Swint (English)
Among the students at the Pokémon School of Melemele Island who befriends Ash in the Sun & Moon series, Kiawe is the oldest and most experienced, being the first among them to have obtained a Z-Ring, which allows him to use "Z-Moves." He runs a dairy farm on Akala Island along with his parents. He specializes in Fire-type Pokémon, due to his being inspired by his late grandfather's words.
Lana (スイレン, Suiren)
Voiced by: Hitomi Kikuchi (Japanese); Rosie Reyes (English)
Lana is one of the students at the Pokémon School of Melemele Island who befriends Ash in Sun & Moon series. She loves Water-type Pokémon and has a caring relationship with her two Pokémon partners. She finds a Sparkling Stone during a treasure hunt on Akala Island which is later made into a Z-Ring for her and a Waterium Z from a Totem Wishiwashi after she wins a battle against it.
Mallow (マオ, Mao)
Voiced by: Reina Ueda (Japanese); Rebecca Soler (Sun & Moon); Emily Cramer (Journeys) (English)
Mallow is one of the students at the Pokémon School of Melemele Island who befriends Ash in the Sun & Moon series. She specializes in Grass-type Pokémon, as she has a Bounsweet, given to her by her late mother, which evolves into a Tsareena. She is also a dedicated chef who works at her family's restaurant, Aina Kitchen, and is willing to travels miles of distance to find exotic ingredients or a new recipe. After helping a longtime family friend to her father and herself and receiving a Grassium Z from the guardian deity Pokémon of Melemele Island, Tapu Koko, Mallow obtains a Z-Ring from Oranguru.
Sophocles (マーマネ, Māmane)
Voiced by: Fumiko Takekuma (Japanese); Alyson Leigh Rosenfeld (English)
Sophocles is one of the students at the Pokémon School of Melemele Island who befriends Ash in the Sun & Moon series. He specializes in Electric-type Pokémon and is skillful with machines. He used to have scotophobia, a fear of dark places, but overcomes it as he wants to become an astronaut. After winning a Vikavolt race, Sophocles obtains a Z-Ring from Hapu. He eventually gets his own laboratory constructed by his dad, which he uses for research.
Goh (ゴウ, Gō)
Voiced by: Daiki Yamashita; Kei Shindō (young, JN001) (Japanese); Zeno Robinson (English)
Goh is a 10-year-old Pokémon Trainer who meets Ash in Pokémon Journeys: The Series and travels with Ash throughout the world. His dream is to catch every Pokémon to work his way up to capturing the rare and Mythical Pokémon Mew. He later ends up joining Project Mew, an organization dedicated to researching and finding Mew. After Project Mew concludes, Goh parts ways with Ash to travel across Kanto alone.
Liko (リコ, Riko; Liko)
Voiced by: Minori Suzuki (Japanese); Alejandra Reynoso (English)
Liko is the female protagonist of Horizons series, who is a Pokémon Trainer from Cabo Poco in the Paldea Region. She owns a mysterious pendant which was given to her by her grandmother, Diana, who is actually the Legendary Pokémon Terapagos in a dormant state. After she is targeted by an organization known as the Explorers for her pendant, she joins the Rising Volt Tacklers, a group of traveling explorers, in order to protect her pendant and travel the world.
Roy (ロイ, Roi; Roy)
Voiced by: Yuka Terasaki (Japanese); Anjali Kunapaneni (English)
Roy is the male protagonist of Horizons series, who is a Pokémon Trainer from the Kanto Region who joins the Rising Volt Tacklers after encountering a mysterious Shiny Rayquaza. His dream is to become a great adventurer like the ones his grandfather used to tell him about when he was a child, even more when he discovers a special connection between the Shiny Rayquaza and Liko's pendant.

The series has had several major characters during its run. In addition to the above, a series of recurring characters known as Nurse Joy (ジョーイ, Joy) and Officer Jenny (ジュンサー, Junsar) appear within each town the protagonist and his friends encounter. Each are a family of identical looking sisters, with the Joy siblings treating injured Pokémon and assisting the Professor of the respective region, while the Jenny siblings acts as the local law enforcement.

== Episodes ==
In Japan, the Pokémon anime is currently broadcast as eight sequential series, each based on an installment of the main video game series. The series is aired year-round continuously, with regular off-days for sporting events and television specials. In its international broadcast, Pokémon's episodes have currently been split up into 29 seasons as of 2026, running a fixed number of episodes, using a specific opening sequence and sporting a different subtitle for each new season.

Season	Season name	Episodes	Originally released	
Season	Season name	Episodes	First released	Last released
1	Indigo League	80	April 1, 1997	January 21, 1999
2	Adventures in the Orange Islands	36	January 28, 1999	October 7, 1999
3	The Johto Journeys	41	October 14, 1999	July 27, 2000
4	Johto League Champions	52	August 3, 2000	August 2, 2001
5	Master Quest	64	August 9, 2001	November 14, 2002
6	Advanced	40	November 21, 2002	August 28, 2003
7	Advanced Challenge	52	September 4, 2003	September 2, 2004
8	Advanced Battle	52	September 9, 2004	September 29, 2005
9	Battle Frontier	47	October 6, 2005	September 14, 2006
10	Diamond and Pearl	51	September 28, 2006	October 25, 2007
11	Diamond and Pearl: Battle Dimension	52	November 8, 2007	December 4, 2008
12	Diamond and Pearl: Galactic Battles	52	December 4, 2008	December 24, 2009
13	Diamond and Pearl: Sinnoh League Victors	34	January 7, 2010	September 9, 2010
14	Black & White	48	September 23, 2010	September 15, 2011
15	Black & White: Rival Destinies	49	September 22, 2011	October 4, 2012
16	Black & White: Adventures in Unova and Beyond	45	October 11, 2012	September 26, 2013
17	XY	48	October 17, 2013	October 30, 2014
18	XY: Kalos Quest	45	November 13, 2014	October 22, 2015
19	XYZ	48	October 29, 2015	October 27, 2016
20	Sun & Moon	43	November 17, 2016	September 21, 2017
21	Sun & Moon: Ultra Adventures	48	October 5, 2017	October 14, 2018
22	Sun & Moon: Ultra Legends	54	October 21, 2018	November 3, 2019
23	Journeys	48	November 17, 2019	December 4, 2020
24	Master Journeys	42	December 11, 2020	December 10, 2021
25	Ultimate Journeys	54	December 17, 2021	March 24, 2023
26	Horizons	45	April 14, 2023	March 29, 2024
27	Horizons – The Search for Laqua	44	April 12, 2024	March 21, 2025
28	Horizons – Rising Hope	47	April 11, 2025	May 1, 2026
29	Horizons – Wonders Ahead	22	May 22, 2026	TBA

=== Specials ===
In addition to the main series and the movies, the anime series has also had various full-length specials and TV shorts. Many of these specials center around legendary Pokémon or one or more of the main characters that are separate from the main cast during its corresponding series, while the sporadically made later side story episodes typically air as special episodes.

== Films ==
Pokémon anime films release timeline
1998	Pokémon: The First Movie
1999	Pokémon the Movie 2000
2000	Pokémon 3: The Movie
2001	Pokémon 4Ever
2002	Pokémon Heroes
2003	Pokémon: Jirachi, Wish Maker
2004	Pokémon: Destiny Deoxys
2005	Pokémon: Lucario and the Mystery of Mew
2006	Pokémon Ranger and the Temple of the Sea
2007	Pokémon: The Rise of Darkrai
2008	Pokémon: Giratina and the Sky Warrior
2009	Pokémon: Arceus and the Jewel of Life
2010	Pokémon—Zoroark: Master of Illusions
2011	Pokémon the Movie: White—Victini and Zekrom
2011	Pokémon the Movie: Black—Victini and Reshiram
2012	Pokémon the Movie: Kyurem vs. the Sword of Justice
2013	Pokémon the Movie: Genesect and the Legend Awakened
2014	Pokémon the Movie: Diancie and the Cocoon of Destruction
2015	Pokémon the Movie: Hoopa and the Clash of Ages
2016	Pokémon the Movie: Volcanion and the Mechanical Marvel
2017	Pokémon the Movie: I Choose You!
2018	Pokémon the Movie: The Power of Us
2019	Pokémon: Mewtwo Strikes Back — Evolution
2020	Pokémon the Movie: Secrets of the Jungle

Pokémon live action films release timeline
2019	Pokémon Detective Pikachu

As of 2020, there have been 23 animated films and one live action film based on the Pokémon franchise. The first nineteen animated films are based on the television series, with the original film being remade into the 22nd. The 20th, 21st and 23rd animated films are set in an alternate continuity to the anime. The films are variously produced by the animation studios OLM, Production I.G, Xebec, and Wit Studio, and distributed in Japan by Toho, with various studios distributing the films in North America. They were directed by Kunihiko Yuyama and Tetsuo Yajima, and written by Takeshi Shudo, Hideki Sonoda, Atsuhiro Tomioka, Shōji Yonemura, Eiji Umehara, and Aya Takaha.

== Spin-off ==
=== Pokémon Chronicles ===
Pokémon Chronicles is a label created by 4Kids which is used for a collection of several as yet undubbed specials, which were first broadcast in English between May and October 2005 in the UK, and in the US between June and November 2006. The vast majority of the episodes making up Chronicles were taken from what was known in Japan as Pocket Monsters Side Stories (ポケットモンスター サイドストーリー, Poketto Monsutā Saido Sutōrī), which aired as part of Weekly Pokémon Broadcasting Station. The remaining portions of Chronicles consisted of a TV special called The Legend of Thunder, and installments from Pikachu's Winter Vacation, originally released on video.

== Japanese variety shows ==
Pokémon variety show release timeline
1999	Pocket Monsters Encore
2000
2001
2002	Weekly Pokémon Broadcasting Station
2003
2004	Pokémon Sunday
2005
2006
2007
2008
2009
2010	Pokémon Smash!
2011
2012
2013	Pokémon Get TV
2014
2015	Meet Up at the Pokémon House?
2016
2017
2018
2019
2020
2021
2022	Where Are We Going with Pokémon!?

=== Pocket Monsters Encore ===
Pocket Monsters Encore (ポケットモンスター アンコール, Poketto Monsutā Ankōru) was broadcast on TV Tokyo from October 19, 1999, to September 17, 2002. It ran during the second part of the original series. Pocket Monsters Encore is a variety show featuring reruns of old episodes, including Japanese and English audio tracks, except for EP035 and EP018, which were broadcast in stereo. EP022 and EP023 broadcast together. EP018 was taken out of sequence and inserted between Holiday Hi-Jynx and Snow Way Out!, which were broadcast in the place of EP038 and EP039. EP052 aired between EP047 and EP048 and EP053 between EP057 and EP058. The ending song is the English version of Type: Wild performed by Robbie Danzie, and it was produced for Pocket Monsters Encore and aired.

Pokémon de English (ポケモンdeイングリッシュ, Pokémon de Ingurisshu) was a segment at the end of Pocket Monsters Encore used to teach Japanese children simple English words and phrases. All of the segments where later compiled into three volumes and later released.

Pokémon de English uses a mixture of unedited Japanese and painted-over English video. New English lines were also recorded for this release by the original voice actors from both Japan and the United States. Pokémon de English was later released as rental only VHS and DVDs in 2002 and 2007, respectively, including English audio, as well as closed captioning in both English and Japanese.

On September 17, 2002, it was replaced by Weekly Pokémon Broadcasting Station.

=== Weekly Pokémon Broadcasting Station ===
Weekly Pokémon Broadcasting Station (週刊ポケモン放送局, Shūkan Pokémon Hōsōkyoku) is a closely related spin-off series that aired during the final part of the original series, and continues during the beginning part of Pokémon: Advanced Generation. The show was presented as an animated variety show, and showed clip shows, reruns of Pokémon episodes, television airings of the Pokémon movies, cast interviews, and live action footage, in addition to the previously mentioned Pokémon side story episodes. The hosts were Mayumi Iizuka as Kasumi (Misty) and Yūji Ueda as Takeshi (Brock). They were regularly joined by Kaba-chan, Manami Aihara, Bernard Ackah and Rex Jones as the comedy team "Shio Koshō", Megumi Hayashibara as Musashi (Jessie), Shin-ichiro Miki as Kojirō (James), and Inuko Inuyama as Nyāsu (Meowth). The show ran from October 15, 2002, to September 28, 2004, when it was replaced by Pokémon Sunday.

=== Pokémon Sunday ===
Pokémon Sunday (ポケモン☆サンデー, Pokémon Sandē) was broadcast on TV Tokyo from October 3, 2004, to September 26, 2010. The show is the successor to the Pocket Monsters Encore and the Weekly Pokémon Broadcasting Station. It ran from the second part of Pokémon: Advanced Generation to Pokémon: Diamond & Pearl. Like the shows before it, Pokémon Sunday is variety show featuring reruns of old episodes as well as a number of 'Research' episodes involving live-action elements. Regular guests include Golgo Matsumoto and Red Yoshida of TIM; Hiroshi Yamamoto, Ryūji Akiyama, and Hiroyuki Baba of Robert; Becky (through September 2006), and Shoko Nakagawa (starting October 2006).

=== Pokémon Smash! ===
Pokémon Smash! (ポケモンスマッシュ!, Pokémon Sumasshu!) is the successor to the Pokémon Sunday series. It aired from October 3, 2010, to September 28, 2013. Like its predecessors, Pokémon Smash! is a variety show that features live-action segments and reruns of old anime episodes. It ran during Pokémon: Black and White. The theme song is "Endless Fighters" by AAA. Regular guests include Golgo Matsumoto and Red Yoshida of TIM; Shoko Nakagawa; and Hiroshi Yamamoto, Ryūji Akiyama, and Hiroyuki Baba of Robert.

=== Pokémon Get TV ===
Pokémon Get TV (ポケモンゲット☆TV, Pokémon Getto Terebi) is the successor to Pokémon Smash! It aired from October 6, 2013, to September 27, 2015. Shoko Nakagawa remains as a host, and is joined by Yukito Nishii and comedy team Taka and Toshi. Just like its predecessors, it is a variety show featuring reruns of previous anime episodes and special live-action segments. It ran during the first part of Pokémon: XY.

=== Meet Up at the Pokémon House? ===
Meet Up at the Pokémon House? (ポケモンの家あつまる？, Pokémon no Uchi Atsumaru?), more commonly known as Pokénchi (ポケんち) or Pokémon House (ポケモンの家), is the successor to Pokémon Get TV, it aired from October 4, 2015, to March 29, 2022. It is hosted by Shōko Nakagawa, Rinka Ōtani, Hyadain, and Abareru-kun, making it the first variety show not to have reruns of previous anime episodes, unlike its predecessors. It ran during Pokémon: XY (second part), Pokémon: Sun & Moon and Pokémon Journeys (first part).

=== Where Are We Going with Pokémon!? ===
Where Are We Going with Pokémon!? (ポケモンとどこいく！？, Pokémon to doko iku!?), more commonly known as Poké Doko (ポケどこ, Poké Doko), is the successor to Meet Up at the Pokémon House?, which premiered on April 3, 2022, during Pokémon Journeys (second part) and Pokémon Horizons. It is hosted by Shoko Nakagawa (later replaced by Shuhei Nakano), Ryōgo Matsumaru, Abareru-kun, and Hikaru Takahashi, and it focuses on their travels.

== Airing and production ==
Pokémon premiered in Japan on TV Tokyo on April 1, 1997. The series is broadcast on the TX Network family of stations first on Thursday evenings; it is then syndicated throughout the rest of Japan's major broadcasters (All-Nippon News Network, Fuji Network System, Nippon Television Network System) on their local affiliates as well as on private satellite and cable networks on various delays. Production in Japan is handled by TV Tokyo, MediaNet (formerly TV Tokyo MediaNet and Softx), and ShoPro (formerly Shogakukan Productions). Kunihiko Yuyama served as the series's chief director up until the 2023 episode, "To Be a Pokémon Master". The anime made millions of dollars in Japan when it first aired. An average Pokémon episode costs about $100,000 to make.

Internationally, The Pokémon Company handles production and distribution of the anime with Iyuno Media Group and Goldcrest Post with publication by VIZ Media, which was formerly VIZ LLC but merged with ShoPro. The anime has been aired in 192 countries. In the United States, the anime aired on Kids' WB as a Saturday morning cartoon starting in February 1999. In its first week under the Kids' WB umbrella, Pokémon would manage to hit a 3.9 rating (a percentage of how much a specific demographic of people is watching), reaching 3.1 million viewers by September, and resulting in Nielsen stating that "half the boys (ages 6–11) watching TV (at 10 a.m.) are seeing Pokémon" by that November.

Beginning in 2020, Netflix gained the exclusive rights to stream new episodes of the series in the United States; the twenty-third season, titled Pokémon Journeys: The Series debuted on June 12, 2020, and ended on March 5, 2021, with its fourth twelve episode batch. It continues with the twenty-fourth season, titled Pokémon Master Journeys: The Series, which debuted on the service on September 10, 2021. The series has previously aired in syndication, with new episodes premiering on Kids' WB, Cartoon Network, and Disney XD. In the U.S., library episodes also aired on Cartoon Network in the Kids' WB years starting in 2002 and Boomerang in the Cartoon Network years starting in 2010.

Pokémon was originally licensed in the United States by 4Kids Entertainment, which produced a localized English adaptation that was syndicated by The Summit Media Group. The localized version premiered in first run syndication on September 8, 1998, twenty days before the North American release of Pokémon Red and Blue. Pokémon was distributed on VHS and DVD by Pioneer Entertainment and Viz Video, which sold 25 million units of the series in 2000. Following the eighth season in 2006, the series's dub production was taken over by The Pokémon Company. Beginning with twelfth film, 2009's Arceus and the Jewel of Life, DuArt Film and Video took over as the lead production studio, which lasted until the twenty-second season in 2018.

OLM, Inc. handles animation production. Until episode 259 (episode 262 in Japan), during the fifth season in 2002, the series was animated using cel animation. Beginning with episode 260 (episode 263 in Japan), titled "Here's Lookin' at You Elekid!", all subsequent seasons are digitally animated.

In a 2018 interview, the creators of Detective Pikachu, which features a talking Pikachu, revealed that the original intention for the anime was to have the Pokémon talk, but OLM, Inc. was unable to come up with a concept that Game Freak, developer of the mainline games, were accepting of.

The following table lists the annual content revenue from Pokémon anime media in Japan, as reported by market research firm Hakuhodo.

Year	Content revenue in Japan	Ref
2013	¥10.6 billion ($109 million)	
2014	¥8.2 billion ($77 million)	
2015	Unknown	
2016	Unknown	
2017	¥10.3 billion ($92 million)	
2018	¥12.4 billion ($112 million)	
2019	¥13.4 billion ($123 million)	
2020	¥17.5 billion ($164 million)	
2021	¥27.7 billion ($252 million)	
2013 to 2021	¥100.1 billion+ ($929 million+)	

=== Streaming and digital ===
Pokémon has been available for streaming on Netflix in 216 regions and countries with different dubs and subtitles; all countries have at least English audio. Pokémon has been globally one of the most widely watched shows on Netflix, by 2016. It is also available on Hulu (in the United States and Japan), Amazon Prime Video (in the United States), and Jiohotstar (in India). From when the series made began airing on Disney XD, as much as every in-circulation episode was available on Watch Disney XD and later DisneyNOW in the United States until February 2022. Netflix removed the Sun & Moon series, I Choose You!, and The Power of Us at the end of March 2022, leaving only the first season and the seasons and movies released exclusively to the platform. Content was also available on the Pokémon TV app and website until January 2024, when it was shut down. Starting on December 6, 2024, episodes are uploaded to the Pokémon TV YouTube channel every Sunday, Monday, Wednesday, Friday, and Saturday.

== Reception ==
=== Critical reception ===
In a February 2008 review for IGN, Jeffrey Harris gave the Indigo League series a score of 2 out of 10, saying: "Ultimately, the show's story is boring, repetitive, and formulaic. The show constantly preaches about friendship and helping others. ... Nearly every episode features Ash, Misty, and Brock on a trip. Team Rocket tries the latest scheme to catch Pikachu or whatever else, and fails miserably." He concluded: "at the end of the day, this franchise feels more like crass marketing then [sic] trying to preach the importance of friend and companionship." In an April 2008 review, Common Sense Media gave the series 3 out of 5 stars, saying: "Over the years, the energetic, imagination-filled, Japanese-inspired fantasy series has cut across cultural, gender, and age barriers to captivate a global audience of girls, boys, and even adults", but added: "Folks may also find the franchise's massive commercial appeal disturbing, especially since the show is mainly geared towards kids."

Carl Kimlinger, in an August 2008 review of the Diamond and Pearl series for Anime News Network, gave the dubbed series an overall grade of C. He wrote: "The formula has been set in stone … Ash and buddies wander around, meet a new pokémon [sic] or pokémon [sic] trainer, fight, make friends, and then use their newfound Power of Friendship to stave off an attack by the nefarious Team Rocket", and added: "even the tournaments are a relief, a blessed pause in the cerebrum-liquefying formula as Ash and company square off against destined rivals for an episode or two." However, he stated that it would be enjoyed by its target audience, saying: "It's colorful, silly and lively (if insanely simplistic and cheap)" and added: "Parents will appreciate the absolute lack of objectionable content (aside from the promotion of animism) and the series's impeccably PC message of friendship, cooperation and acceptance". He criticized the series's soundtrack as "tin-eared" and "bad video game music".

Kevin McFarland, in a 2016 binge-watching guide of the Indigo League series for Wired, described the series as "a kids program that emphasizes the value of hard work, the importance of family and close friendship, and the ideals of love, trust, and honor. But it's also a largely silly show with slapstick comedy and colorful battle sequences, making Ash's Sisyphean task to become the world's best Pokémon trainer continually entertaining."

In TV Asahi's poll of the "Top 100 Anime", Pokémon came in 38th. Paste ranked the series at 44th place in its October 2018 list of "The 50 Best Anime Series of All Time", with Sarra Sedghi writing: "To the joy of '90s kids everywhere, Pokémon helped solidify anime (and, hopefully, good punnery) in the West". She added: "Pokémon may not be high artistry (because, you know, it's for children), but the show's pervasiveness is a testament to the power of nostalgia." IGN ranked the series at 70th place in its list of "Top 100 Animated Series", saying that the series "had clever writing and a golden marketing formula designed to spread Nintendo's Pokémon videogames into new, lucrative territory."

=== Controversies ===
The series has had several episodes removed from rotation in Japan or the rest of the world for various reasons. The most infamous of these episodes was "Dennō Senshi Porygon", aired in Japan on December 16, 1997. The episode made headlines worldwide when it caused 685 children to experience seizures and seizure-like symptoms caused by a repetitive flash of light in the episode. Although the offending sequence was caused by Pikachu's actions, the episode's featured Pokémon, Porygon, has rarely been seen in future episodes, with appearances limited to one brief cameo appearance in the film Pokémon Heroes and in one scene-bumper later in season 1. Its evolutions Porygon2 and Porygon-Z have only appeared in a brief part of the opening sequence of Pokémon the Movie: Kyurem vs. the Sword of Justice. Several other episodes have been removed from broadcast in Japan due to contemporary disasters that resemble events in the program; the 2004 Chūetsu earthquake, the 2011 Tōhoku earthquake and tsunami, and the 2014 Sinking of MV Sewol, all have caused cancellations or indefinite or temporary postponements of episode broadcasts. In the United States, the September 11 attacks in 2001 as well as 2005's Hurricane Katrina led to the temporary removal of two episodes from syndication.

On September 1, 2006, China banned the series from prime time broadcasting (from 17:00 to 20:00), as it did Western animated series such as The Simpsons, to protect its struggling animation studios. The ban was later extended by one hour.

On August 18, 2016, the XYZ episode "Kalos League Victory! Satoshi's Greatest Decisive Battle" (カロスリーグ優勝！サトシ頂上決戦, transliterated as "Karosurīgu yūshō! Satoshi chōjō kessen", titled "Down to the Fiery Finish!" in the English dub) faced criticism from fans when Ash lost the Kalos League against Alain. The fans specifically criticized the episode due to the misleading name and trailers that suggested that Ash would win the battle and because Ash had lost all of the Pokémon Leagues in past seasons. Fans also disliked the outcome because they believed Ash's Greninja had many advantages over Alain's Charizard, including the fact that Water-type Pokémon resist Fire-type Pokémon attacks, and that the rare Bond Phenomenon Ash's Greninja was subject to was said to be far more powerful than a conventional Mega Evolution. Several animators of the series also expressed disappointment that Ash had lost. TV Tokyo's YouTube upload of the teaser of the next episode received an overwhelming number of dislikes as a result of the outcome.

=== Influence ===
The series is considered to be one of the first anime series on television to reach a high level of mainstream success with Western audiences. It has also been credited with helping the game series to achieve a higher degree of popularity, and vice versa.

== See also ==
- List of television programs based on video games
