= Pokémon the Movie: Diancie and the Cocoon of Destruction =

2014 Pokémon film directed by Kunihiko Yuyama

- Theatrical release poster

Japanese name
- Kanji: ポケモン・ザ・ムービーXY 「破壊の繭とディアンシー」
- Literal meaning: Pokémon the Movie XY: Diancie and the Cocoon of Destruction
Transcriptions
- Revised Hepburn: Pokemon Za Mūbī Ekkusu Wai Hakai no Mayu to Dianshī
- Directed by: Kunihiko Yuyama
- Screenplay by: Hideki Sonoda
- Based on: Pokémon X and Y by: Satoshi Tajiri; Junichi Masuda; Ken Sugimori
- Produced by: Takemoto Mori; Junya Okamoto; Nobuyuki Hosoya; Kenichi Arai
- Starring: see below
- Cinematography: Tatsumi Yukiwaki
- Edited by: Toshio Henmi
- Music by: Shinji Miyazaki
- Production companies: OLM, Inc. OLM Digital
- Distributed by: Toho
- Release date: July 19, 2014 (Japan)
- Running time: 77 minutes
- Country: Japan
- Language: Japanese
- Box office: ¥2.91 billion ($28.2 million)

Pokémon the Movie: Diancie and the Cocoon of Destruction (ポケモン・ザ・ムービーXY 「破壊の繭とディアンシー」, Pokemon Za Mūbī Ekkusu Wai Hakai no Mayu to Dianshī; lit. 'Pokémon the Movie XY: Diancie and the Cocoon of Destruction') is a 2014 Japanese animated fantasy adventure film created by Satoshi Tajiri and produced by OLM. It is the seventeenth film of the Pokémon anime series and the first film of Pokémon the Series: XY. Directed by Kunihiko Yuyama and written by Hideki Sonoda, the film stars the voices of Rica Matsumoto, Ikue Ōtani, Mayuki Makiguchi, Yūki Kaji, Mariya Ise, Megumi Hayashibara, Shin-ichiro Miki, Inuko Inuyama, Marika Matsumoto, Reiji Nakagawa, Shoko Nakagawa, Rika Adachi, and Kōichi Yamadera. In the film, Diancie, a Pokémon who is the Princess of an underground kingdom, joins the Pokémon trainer Ash Ketchum and his friends, Pikachu, Serena, Clemont, and Bonnie on a journey to meet the Legendary Pokémon Xerneas, who will awaken the power in Diancie to create a source of energy that will save the kingdom.

It was released in Japanese theaters on July 19, 2014. An English dub of the film was produced by DuArt Film and Video, and stars the voices of Sarah Natochenny, Haven Paschall, Michael Liscio Jr., Alyson Leigh Rosenfeld, Michele Knotz, Carter Cathcart, Caitlin Glass, Pete Zarustica, Brittney Lee Hamilton, Lianne Marie Dobbs, and Marc Thompson. It premiered in Australia and in New Zealand in theaters on November 8, 2014, and also aired in the United States on that date on Cartoon Network.

== Plot ==
The Heart Diamond, the sole energy source of the underground kingdom called the Diamond Domain, is failing and needs replacing. The only one who can create a new Heart Diamond and save the kingdom is the Mythical Pokémon Diancie, the kingdom's Princess, but she does not yet have the power to make one. Diancie goes on a journey to meet the life-giving Legendary Pokémon Xerneas, who will allow Diancie to discover the power to create a Heart Diamond. After months of searching for Xerneas, Diancie goes to explore a city she spotted. She meets the Pokémon trainer Ash Ketchum and his friends, Pikachu, Serena, Clemont, and Bonnie. Ash and his friends join Diancie on her quest to meet Xerneas.

Diancie and the rest of the group track down Xerneas to the Allearth Forest, which became a forbidden place after Yveltal, the embodiment of destruction, destroyed the forest and became a giant cocoon called the Cocoon of Destruction. Xerneas teaches Diancie how to create a new Heart Diamond. Team Rocket and the thieves Riot, Marilyn, Millis, and Argus Steel fight for control of Diancie and her power to create diamonds. This disturbs the Cocoon and causes Yveltal to wake up. Yveltal turns the thieves, their Pokémon, and Pikachu to stone with its destructive powers. Xerneas makes Yveltal leave the forest, and uses its life force to restore the forest and the people and Pokémon there as well as Ash's Pikachu, becoming a tree to protect the balance of nature. Diancie returns to the Diamond Domain to create a new Heart Diamond, saving the kingdom.

== Production ==
The movie was first announced after the theatrical release of Pokémon the Movie: Genesect and the Legend Awakened, with a short trailer shown. Later in December 2013, the January 2014 issue of CoroCoro Comic confirmed the title of the movie, alongside the official website's announcement with the official trailer featured on the official movie website. The first poster of the movie shows all the confirmed Mega Evolutions of some Pokémon in Pokémon X and Y. The February issue of CoroCoro states that the movie will revolve around the "Magnificent Battle" between Xerneas and Yveltal as well as the hidden meaning to the title, related to the Destruction Pokémon. It also notes that many Legendary Pokémon and several Mega Evolutions will appear in the film.

The Cocoon of Destruction was shown alongside the Pikachu Short Pikachu, What's This Key? (ピカチュウ、これなんのカギ？, Pikachū, Kore Nan no Kagi?) on which will feature the new Pokémon Klefki. The magazine also reveals that it will also feature Jirachi, Victini, Manaphy, and Darkrai as special guests.

The film made its English language debut on November 8, 2014, on Cartoon Network in the United States, and in theaters in Australia and New Zealand. In addition, a prequel to the movie, titled Diancie: Princess of the Diamond Domain made its debut on the American Pokémon Trading Card Game website on November 5, 2014, with Carbink, Pangoro, and an Ariados.

=== Setting ===
The film's official setting was based on Canada, with locations include the city of Ottawa, the Rideau Canal, the town of Merrickville, Skydeck Tower, the Thousand Islands of Saint Lawrence River, the city of Toronto, Quebec, and the town of Niagara-on-the-Lake. The castle from the opening theme is the Château Frontenac and the fight occurs on Terrace Dufferin. Director Yuyama stated that it is the first time since Pokémon the Movie: Black—Victini and Reshiram and White—Victini and Zekrom that he and his crew traveled to a foreign country for inspiration.

== Cast ==
=== Regular characters ===
| Character | Japanese | English |
|---|---|---|
| Ash Ketchum | Rica Matsumoto | Sarah Natochenny |
| Pikachu | Ikue Ōtani | Ikue Ōtani |
| Serena | Mayuki Makiguchi | Haven Paschall |
| Clemont | Yūki Kaji | Michael Liscio Jr. |
| Bonnie | Mariya Ise | Alyson Leigh Rosenfeld |
| Jessie | Megumi Hayashibara | Michele Knotz |
| James | Shin-ichiro Miki | Carter Cathcart |
| Meowth | Inuko Inuyama | Carter Cathcart |
| Narrator | Unshō Ishizuka | Rodger Parsons |

=== Guest characters ===
- Diancie (ディアンシー, Dianshī): Known as the Jewel Pokémon, Diancie is the princess of the Diamond Domain, home to Carbink that keep it peaceful as well the Heart Diamond that keeps it safe from outsiders. However, Diancie is growing weak, as is the Heart Diamond. She seeks out Ash and his friends to help her find the Life Pokémon Xerneas to restore her life energy, but on the way they are attacked by the Destruction Pokémon Yveltal. Diancie is voiced by Marika Matsumoto in the original Japanese version and by Caitlin Glass in the English dub.
- Argus Steel (アルガス・スティール, Argus Steel): The father of Millis Steel. A man who loves chocolate and owns a blimp. He wants to use Diancie's power to create diamonds. He is voiced by Reiji Nakagawa in Japanese and by Pete Zarustica in English.
- Millis Steel (ミリス・スティール, Millis Steel): A traveling trainer whose Pokémon is Chesnaught. She and her father help rescue Diancie only to reveal they want to use her power to their advantage and they only rescued her so that Ash and his friends could help her to make real diamonds and then they could kidnap her. She is voiced by Shoko Nakagawa in Japanese and Brittney Lee Hamilton in English.
- Marilyn Flame (マリリン・フレーム, Marilyn Flame) and Ninja Riot (ニンジャ・ライオット, Ninja Riot): A pair of jewel thieves who attack Diancie. Director Kunihiko Yuyama stated that they would be more lighthearted than previous movie villains, using interactions and exchanges to provide humor. Yuyama also stated that Marilyn Flame was designed with "more sex appeal than any earlier character, to give the adults a little bonus". Marilyn Flame's partner Pokémon is Delphox while Ninja Riot's is Greninja. Marilyn Flame and Ninja Riot are voiced by Rika Adachi and Kōichi Yamadera, respectively. Their respective English voice actors are Lianne Marie Dobbs and Marc Thompson.

== Music ==
The film's Japanese ending theme is titled "Yoake no Ryūseigun" (夜明けの流星群; lit. 'Dawn of the Meteor Shower') by Scandal. The ending single was released on July 16, 2014. The English ending theme is titled "Open My Eyes" composed by Ed Goldfarb, and performed by Dani Marcus. This ending theme was released digitally as part of the Pokémon Movie Music Collection on December 23, 2017.
