= Pokémon the Series: XY =

Seventeenth season of the Pokémon animated television series

- Season 17
- No. of episodes: 48 + 1 special

Release
- Original network: TV Tokyo
- Original release: October 17, 2013 – October 30, 2014

Season chronology
- ← Previous; BW: Adventures in Unova and Beyond Next → XY Kalos Quest

Pokémon the Series: XY (Note: It is the first dubbed season to use the "Pokémon the Series" branding and as such can be a starting point.) is the seventeenth season of the Pokémon anime series and the first and titular season of Pokémon the Series: XY, known in Japan as Pocket Monsters: XY (ポケットモンスター エックス・ワイ, Poketto Monsutā Ekkusu Wai).

The season follows Ash Ketchum as he travels across the Kalos region to challenge its Pokémon League while joined by Serena, an aspiring Pokémon Performer, Clemont, the Lumiose City Gym Leader and an inventor, and Bonnie, his younger sister.

The season originally aired in Japan from October 17, 2013, to October 30, 2014, on TV Tokyo, and in the United States from January 18, 2014, to December 20, 2014, on Cartoon Network, after a preview of the first two episodes on October 19, 2013.

== Episode list ==
Jap. overall (Note: The English episode numbers are based on their first airing in the United States in syndication on Cartoon Network. Other English-speaking nations largely follow either this order or the Japanese order.)	Eng. overall	No. in season	English title Japanese title	Original release date	English air date
802	796	1	"Kalos, Where Dreams and Adventures Begin!" (Let's Go to the Kalos Region! The Beginning of Dreams and Adventures!!); Transliteration: "Karosu-chihō ni Yattekita! Yume to Bōken no Hajimari!!" (Japanese: カロス地方にやってきた！夢と冒険のはじまり！！)	October 17, 2013	January 18, 2014 (Note: These episodes were broadcast in the United States on October 19, 2013, as a special sneak peek at the upcoming season which had recently begun broadcast in Japan.)
Ash arrives in the Kalos Region with Alexa. Alexa reveals her sister is the Santalune City Gym Leader, but she seems to be away. Then, Ash reaches the Lumiose City Gym to challenge the Gym leader but Ash doesn't have 4 badges, so the Gym paralyzes and throws them out. Then Ash and Pikachu meet Clemont and Bonnie. Ash and Clemont have their first Kalos Region Pokémon Battle. Team Rocket is also in the Kalos Region and they try to catch Ash's Pikachu, but they fail thanks to Froakie, a Kalos Water-type Starter Pokémon who gets badly injured in the process. Ash and the others go to Professor Augustine Sycamore's lab to heal Froakie.
803	797	2	"Lumiose City Pursuit!" (Mega Evolution and the Prism Tower!); Transliteration: "Mega Shinka to Purizumu Tawā!" (Japanese: メガシンカとプリズムタワー！)	October 17, 2013	January 25, 2014
Ash heads to Professor Sycamore's laboratory to heal Froakie. Here Ash discovers the Pokémon Professor is examining a Garchomp. Team Rocket eavesdrops on their conversation and tries to steal Garchomp for themselves. They fail and cause Garchomp to go out of control. Ash and Pikachu, along with Froakie, manage to remove the device Team Rocket put on Garchomp that caused it to lose control. Afterwards, Froakie joins Ash.
804	798	3	"A Battle of Aerial Mobility!" (Keromatsu vs. Yayakoma! The Aerial Battle!!); Transliteration: "Keromatsu Bui Esu Yayakoma! Kūchūkidō Batoru!!" (Japanese: ケロマツVSヤヤコマ！空中機動バトル！！)	October 24, 2013	February 1, 2014
After Ash registers for the Kalos League, he encounters a Pokémon called Dedenne and a Fletchling. His newly captured Froakie does his best to battle Fletchling, but Clemont accidentally angers a swarm of Beedrill.
805	799	4	"A Shockingly Cheeky Friendship!" (Pikachu and Dedenne! Nuzzle!!); Transliteration: "Pikachū to Dedenne! Hoppesurisuri!!" (Japanese: ピカチュウとデデンネ！ほっぺすりすり！！)	October 31, 2013	February 8, 2014
Clemont tries to capture the Dedenne that keeps stealing their food.
806	800	5	"A Blustery Santalune Gym Battle!" (The Hakudan Gym Battle! The Magnificent Viviyon's Dance Battle!!); Transliteration: "Hakudan Jimu Sen! Kareinaru Bibiyon no Mai Batoru!!" (Japanese: ハクダンジム戦！華麗なるビビヨンの舞バトル！！)	November 7, 2013	February 15, 2014
Ash and his new group of friends finally meet up with Alexa in Santalune City, where she introduces Ash to her sister, the Gym Leader Viola. Ash has his first Gym Battle in the Kalos Region, but he is defeated when Viola's Bug-type Pokémon put up a good fight. Afterwards, Ash reunites with his childhood friend, Serena.
807	801	6	"Battling on Thin Ice!" (The Icy Rematch! Pikachu vs. Viviyon!!); Transliteration: "Hyōjō Kessen! Pikachū Tai Bibiyon!!" (Japanese: 氷上決戦！ピカチュウVSビビヨン！！)	November 14, 2013	February 22, 2014
Ash challenges Viola to a rematch. He is now ready for Surskit's battleground freezing strategy.
808	802	7	"Giving Chase at the Rhyhorn Race!" (Leave it to Serena!? The Wild Sihorn Race!); Transliteration: "Serena ni Omakase!? Gekisō Saihōn Rēsu!" (Japanese: セレナにおまかせ！？激走サイホーンレース！)	November 21, 2013	March 1, 2014
Ash is introduced to the world of Rhyhorn Racing. Serena, whose mother Grace is a famous Rhyhorn racer, coaches Ash in the upcoming race. Meanwhile, Team Rocket has their sights on capturing Pikachu and the Racing Rhyhorn.
809	803	8	"Grooming Furfrou!" (The Pokémon Trimmer and Trimmian!); Transliteration: "Pokémon Torimā to Torimian!" (Japanese: ポケモントリマーとトリミアン！)	November 28, 2013	March 8, 2014
In the next town, the guidebook reveals that it is home to Pokemon Groomers, people whose expertise is styling the Pokémon Furfrou. Jessica, a Pokemon Groomer in training, is having problems with her confidence, which is only exacerbated by the expert Pokemon Groomer Jessalli, who is not who she appears to be.
810	804	9	"Clemont's Got a Secret!" (Capture Miare Gym! Citron's Secret!!); Transliteration: "Miare Jimu Kōryaku! Shitoron no Himitsu!!" (Japanese: ミアレジム攻略！シトロンの秘密！！)	December 5, 2013	March 15, 2014
Upon returning to Lumiose City, the group meets up with Clemont's and Bonnie's father Meyer, who reveals to Ash and Serena that Clemont is Lumiose City's Gym Leader. Meyer also reveals that Clembot, a robot Clemont had built to look after the gym in his absence, has gone haywire. Ash and Clemont infiltrate the gym to beat Clembot in a Pokémon battle to take back the Lumiose Gym.
811	805	10	"Mega-Mega Meowth Madness!" (Harimaron vs. Mega Mega Nyarth!!); Transliteration: "Harimaron Tai Mega Mega Nyāsu!!" (Japanese: ハリマロンVSメガメガニャース！！)	December 12, 2013	March 22, 2014
Before heading to Cyllage City, the group decides to stop by the Sycamore Pokémon Lab. Team Rocket decides to kidnap Professor Sycamore as well as Serena and Bonnie to pick the professor's brain for the secrets behind Mega Evolution. Meanwhile, Ash and Clemont have to deal with a gluttonous little Chespin with a penchant for macarons.
812	806	11	"The Bamboozling Forest!" (The Bamboo Forest Chase! Yancham and Goronda!!); Transliteration: "Chikurin no Tsuiseki! Yanchamu to Goronda!!" (Japanese: 竹林の追跡！ヤンチャムとゴロンダ！！)	December 19, 2013	March 29, 2014
While on their journey, the group are stopping for lunch when they are interrupted by two hungry Pancham. When Team Rocket attacks, the Pokémon get separated from their trainers. As Ash and his friends try to find Pikachu, Froakie, Fennekin and Chespin, Team Rocket tries capturing Pikachu again. However, they cross paths with a Pangoro along the way and end up making it angry.
813	807	12	"To Catch a Pokémon Smuggler!" (Capture the Pokémon Buyer! The Kofuurai Impersonation Plan!!); Transliteration: "Pokémon Baiyā wo Tsukamero! Kofūrai Gisō Sakusen!!" (Japanese: ポケモンバイヤーを捕まえろ！コフーライ偽装作戦！！)	January 9, 2014	April 5, 2014
While heading towards the next city, the group sees a man escaping from Officer Jenny and along the way find a Scatterbug that fell out of the man's truck. It turns out that the man is a Pokémon poacher who has been capturing Vivillon of different patterns. Ash and his friends decide to help Officer Jenny catch him.
814	808	13	"Kindergarten Chaos!" (Nymphia vs. Keromatsu! Kindergarten Chaos!!); Transliteration: "Ninfia Tai Keromatsu! Yōchien wa Ōsawagi!!" (Japanese: ニンフィアVSケロマツ！幼稚園は大さわぎ！！)	January 16, 2014	April 12, 2014
Ash and his friends come across a girl named Penelope who asks to battle Ash. If she wins then Ash has to come with her. It turns out that there's more to this than romance.
815	809	14	"Seeking Shelter From the Storm!" (The Spooky Shelter! Nyasper Is Watching!!); Transliteration: "Bukimi na Amayadori! Nyasupā wa Miteita!!" (Japanese: ぶきみな雨宿り！ニャスパーは見ていた！！)	January 30, 2014	April 19, 2014
When Ash and his friends are caught in a rain storm, they find a nearby abandoned mansion to take refuge. Unbeknownst to them, Team Rocket has taken refuge in the same place. Both groups are frightened by strange occurrences through the house, which is all centered on a mysterious shadow.
816	810	15	"An Appetite for Battle!" (Harimaron vs. Mafoxy! A Diet Battle!?); Transliteration: "Harimaron Bui Esu Mafokushī! Daietto Batoru!?" (Japanese: ハリマロンVSマフォクシー！ダイエットバトル！？)	February 6, 2014	April 26, 2014
Chespin gets fat after eating so many of Serena's macarons. Clemont decides to put it on a diet by making an exercise machine and have it exercise through Pokémon Battles. However, Chespin goes missing after smelling the scent of baking macarons and sleepwalks towards it.
817	811	16	"A Jolting Switcheroo!" (Dedenne Is Pichu and Pichu Is Dedenne...!?); Transliteration: "Dedenne ga Pichū de Pichū ga Dedenne de...!?" (Japanese: デデンネがピチューでピチューがデデンネで...！？)	February 13, 2014	May 3, 2014
Bonnie and another girl named Lynn's bags get mixed up, leaving Lynn with Clemont's Dedenne and Bonnie with Lynn's Pichu.
818	812	17	"A Rush of Ninja Wisdom!" (Keromatsu Against Gekogahshier! Ninja Battle!!); Transliteration: "Keromatsu Tai Gekogashira! Ninja Batoru!!" (Japanese: ケロマツ対ゲコガシラ！忍者バトル！！)	February 20, 2014	May 10, 2014
Ash and his friends meet up with Ninja Trainer Sanpei who owns a Frogadier. Ash challenges Sanpei to a series of ninja-training exercises, during which Froakie learns a new move: double team.
819	813	18	"Awakening the Sleeping Giant!" (Wake Up Kabigon! It's a Battle in the Parfum Palace!!); Transliteration: "Kabigon o Okose! Parufamu Kyūden de Batoru Desu!!" (Japanese: カビゴンを起こせ！パルファム宮殿でバトルです！！)	February 27, 2014	May 17, 2014
In Camphrier Town, Ash and his friends come across a Snorlax that won't wake up. The local King Shabboneau has a Poké Flute that will wake it, but it was stolen by the selfish Princess Allie of Parfum Palace. Ash tries to retrieve it, but the princess demands a Pokémon Battle: if Ash wins he gets the flute, but if he loses the princess gets Pikachu.
820	814	19	"A Conspiracy to Conquer!" (The Conspiracy of Madame X! The Calamanero of Fear!!); Transliteration: "Madamu Ekkusu no Inbō! Kyōfu no Karamanero!!" (Japanese: マダムXの陰謀！恐怖のカラマネロ！！)	March 13, 2014	May 24, 2014
Team Rocket gets brainwashed by the mysterious "Madame X" and her Malamar. Only Meowth is able to escape. Meowth goes to Ash and his friends for help. When Pikachu is captured and brainwashed as well, Ash, Serena, Clemont, Bonnie, and Meowth go to save him and Team Rocket. However, everyone but Ash and Meowth gets brainwashed. This leaves them with no idea on how to stop Madame X.
821	815	20	"Breaking Titles at the Chateau!" (Challenge the Battle Chateau! Viola vs. Zakuro!!); Transliteration: "Chōsen Batoru Shatō! Biora Bui Esu Zakuro!!" (Japanese: 挑戦バトルシャトー！ビオラVSザクロ！！)	March 20, 2014	June 7, 2014
Ash and his friends visit the Battle Chateau. They participate in some matches at the Battle Chateau and witness the battle between Viola and Cyllage City's Gym Leader Grant.
822	816	21	"A PokéVision of Things to Come!" (It's a Debut! Serena and Fokko's PokéVision!!); Transliteration: "Debyū desu! Serena to Fokko de Pokebijon!!" (Japanese: デビューです！セレナとフォッコでポケビジョン！！)	March 27, 2014	June 14, 2014
After watching a popular celebrity making a "PokéVision" video with her Pokémon, Serena tries to make one with her Fennekin.
823	817	22	"Going for the Gold!" (Catch the Golden Koiking!); Transliteration: "Ōgon no Koikingu o Tsuriagero!!" (Japanese: 黄金のコイキングを釣り上げろ！！)	April 10, 2014	June 21, 2014
Ash and his friends make it to Ambrette Town and marvel at its aquarium. They meet the aquarium's director Rodman and his partner Clauncher. They try to help him complete the aquarium's collection by capturing a gold-colored Magikarp.
824	818	23	"Coming Back into the Cold!" (The Aurora Bonds! Amarus and Amaruruga!); Transliteration: "Ōrora no Kizuna! Amarurusu to Amaruruga!!" (Japanese: オーロラの絆！アマルスとアマルルガ！！)	April 17, 2014	June 28, 2014
Ash, Serena, Clemont, and Bonnie meet up with Alexa again. She is covering the new fossil exhibit at the Ambrette Town Museum. All of them meet the revived fossil Pokémon Amaura and Aurorus in the museum's cold storage. However, Team Rocket arrives to steal Amaura. This leaves Ash and his friends on a rescue mission.
825	819	24	"Climbing the Walls!" (Shōyō Gym Battle! Pikachu Against Chigoras!!); Transliteration: "Shōyō Jimu-sen! Pikachū Tai Chigorasu!!" (Japanese: ショウヨウジム戦！ピカチュウ対チゴラス！！)	April 24, 2014	July 5, 2014
Ash and his friends make it to Cyllage City. Ash plans on challenging the Gym Leader Grant. Having already seen his strategy of Rock Tomb with his Onix at the Battle Chateau, Ash plans on having Froakie face the Rock-type Pokémon in battle. Ash's Pikachu battles against Tyrunt.
826	820	25	"A Battle by Any Other Name!" (Peroppafu and Peroream!! The Sweet Battle Isn't Sweet!?); Transliteration: "Peroppafu to Perorīmu!! Amai Tatakai wa Amakunai!?" (Japanese: ペロッパフとペロリーム！！甘い戦いはあまくない！？)	May 8, 2014	July 12, 2014
While on the road, Serena makes some Poké Puffs for Pikachu and Fennekin. Her cooking skills are insulted by Miette, who has the Meringue Pokémon Slurpuff. The two decide to head to the next town, which is holding a Poké Puffs Contest, to see who is the better pastry chef.
827	821	26	"To Find a Fairy Flower!" (Flabébé and the Fairy Flower!); Transliteration: "Furabebe to Yōsei no Hana" (Japanese: フラベベと妖精の花！)	May 15, 2014	July 19, 2014
While brushing out her hair, Bonnie tries a new flower accessory. Bonnie discovers that a Flabébé is latching onto it because she has lost her Fairy Flower. The gang tries to help Flabébé get a new Fairy Flower, but it appears the season is over.
828	822	27	"The Bonds of Evolution!" (Champion Carnet Appears! The Mega Sirknight in the Fog!!); Transliteration: "Chanpion Karune Tōjō! Kiri no Naka no Mega Sānaito!!" (Japanese: チャンピオン・カルネ登場！霧の中のメガサーナイト！！)	May 22, 2014	July 26, 2014
Upon arriving in the next town, Ash learns that Kalos League Champion Diantha will be holding an exhibition match. The exhibition match tickets are already sold out to his dismay. The gang meets Professor Sycamore over there. He introduces them to Diantha who has volunteered to help him with his research on Mega Evolution. She also allows Ash a friendly match. Ash's Pikachu battles against Diantha's Gardevoir. Diantha shows them the power of Mega Evolution when Team Rocket kidnaps her Gardevoir.
829	823	28	"Heroes - Friends and Faux Alike!" (Ta-Da! The Fake Satoshi Appears!!); Transliteration: "Jajān! Nise Satoshi Arawareru!!" (Japanese: ジャジャーン！ニセ サトシ現る！！)	May 29, 2014 (Note: These episodes were broadcast as part of an hour-long special.)	August 2, 2014
Ash, Serena, and Bonnie must find out who has been impersonating them in the town they have just arrived in.
830	824	29	"Mega Revelations!" (Corni and Lucario! The Secrets of Mega Evolution!!); Transliteration: "Koruni to Rukario! Megashinka no Himitsu!!" (Japanese: コルニとルカリオ！メガシンカの秘密！！)	May 29, 2014	August 9, 2014
Ash and his friends meet up with Korrina and her Lucario. They soon discover that she is the Shalour City Gym Leader. Korrina also possesses a Key Stone.
831	825	30	"The Cave of Trials!" (Lucario vs. Bursyamo! The Cave of Trials!!); Transliteration: "Rukario Tai Bashāmo! Shiren no Dōkutsu!!" (Japanese: ルカリオVSバシャーモ！試練の洞窟！！)	June 5, 2014	August 16, 2014
Ash, Serena, Clemont, and Bonnie help Korrina and her Lucario find the Mega Stone Lucarionite in Geosenge Town's caves. They come face to face with a Blaziken protecting the caves.
832	826	31	"The Aura Storm!" (Mega Lucario Against Mega Lucario! A Storm of Auras!!); Transliteration: "Mega Rukario Tai Mega Rukario! Hadō no Arashi!!" (Japanese: メガルカリオ対メガルカリオ！波導の嵐！！)	June 12, 2014	August 23, 2014
Korrina finally finds the Lucarionite. After using it, she loses control of her Mega Lucario who is much too strong for Pikachu to defeat and almost killing Ash in the process. Her grandfather, Gurkinn, must step in to take care of matters using his own Mega Lucario.
833	827	32	"Calling from Beyond the Aura!" (Call Out With Your Heart! Beyond the Aura!!); Transliteration: "Yobiau Kokoro! Hadō no Mukō e!!" (Japanese: 呼び合う心！波導のむこうへ！！)	June 19, 2014	August 30, 2014
Korrina's grandfather, Gurkinn, tasks her with more training to rein in Mega Lucario. Ash and his friends accompany Korrina as they travel to Pomace Mountain. They fall into a trap laid out by Team Rocket.
834	828	33	"The Bonds of Mega Evolution!" (Mega Lucario Against Mega Kucheat! The Bonds of Mega Evolution!!); Transliteration: "Mega Rukario Tai Mega Kuchīto! Megashinka no Kizuna!!" (Japanese: メガルカリオ対メガクチート！メガシンカの絆！！)	July 3, 2014	September 6, 2014
The group heads into the mountains around Pomace Mountain and meet with Mabel, a flower arranger who has mastered the art of Mega Evolution with her Mawile. Korrina then has a friendly match with Mabel.
835	829	34	"The Forest Champion!" (Champion of the Forest! Luchabull Appears!!); Transliteration: "Mori no Chanpion! Ruchaburu Tōjō!" (Japanese: 森のチャンピオン！ルチャブル登場！！)	July 10, 2014	September 13, 2014
Continuing on their journey to Shalour City, Ash and his friends come across the Wrestling Pokémon Hawlucha who is protecting a group of weak Pokémon in the forest from stronger Pokémon like Machamp, Conkeldurr and an Ursaring.
836	830	35	"Battles in the Sky!" (Sky Battle!? Luchabull Against Fiarrow!!); Transliteration: "Sukai Batoru!? Ruchaburu Tai Faiarō!!" (Japanese: スカイバトル！？ルチャブル対ファイアロー！！)	July 24, 2014	September 20, 2014
At Kalos Canyon, Ash learns of the Sky Battle trend and tries it out with Fletchling and Hawlucha against Sky Trainer Moria and her Talonflame.
837	831	36	"The Cave of Mirrors!" (Reflection Cave! Satoshi and the Satoshi of the Mirror Land!?); Transliteration: "Utsushimi no Dōkutsu! Kagami no Kuni no Satoshi to Satoshi!?" (Japanese: うつしみの洞窟！鏡の国のサトシとサトシ！？)	July 31, 2014	September 27, 2014
While traveling in the Reflection Cave, Ash's reflection takes Pikachu away from him. This prompts him to follow into a world within the reflection. Clemont, Serena, and Bonnie try to find a way to bring Ash back. After Ash arrives in the Mirror Dimension, he discovers that his mirror self needs help finding his Pikachu.
838	832	37	"Forging Forest Friendships!" (The Wriggling Forest of Ohrot!); Transliteration: "Ugomeku Mori no Ōrotto!" (Japanese: 蠢く森のオーロット！)	August 7, 2014	October 4, 2014
While practicing for his upcoming Gym battle against Korrina with Hawlucha, Froakie, and Clemont, Ash is kidnapped by the Elder Tree Pokémon Trevenant. This leaves Froakie and Hawlucha to trust each other in saving Ash. Trevenant keeps the others at bay with its power over the forest.
839	833	38	"Summer of Discovery!" (Pokémon Summer Camp! The Rival Trio Appears!!); Transliteration: "Pokémon Samā Kyanpu! Raibaru Sanningumi Tōjō!!" (Japanese: ポケモン・サマーキャンプ！ライバル三人組登場！！)	August 14, 2014	October 11, 2014
Ash, Serena, Clemont, and Bonnie make it to Professor Sycamore's Pokémon Summer Camp, where they meet Shauna, Trevor, and Tierno. They have received Bulbasaur, Charmander, and Squirtle from Professor Sycamore for their starter Pokémon. Shauna, Trevor, and Tierno test their skills against Ash and his friends.
840	834	39	"Day Three Block Busters!" (Serena vs. Sana! PokéVision Showdown!!); Transliteration: "Serena Bui Esu Sana! Pokebijon Taiketsu!!" (Japanese: セレナVSサナ！ポケビジョン対決！！)	August 21, 2014	October 18, 2014
For the second day of the camp, Professor Sycamore tasks the campers to make PokéVision videos. While Serena goes looking for locations with her friends, she and Ash get trapped at the bottom of a cliff.
841	835	40	"Foggy Pokémon Orienteering!" (PokéEnteering! The X in the Fog!!); Transliteration: "Pokeentēringu! Kiri no Naka no Ekkusu!!" (Japanese: ポケエンテーリング！霧の中のX！！)	August 28, 2014	October 25, 2014
The summer campers participate in a Pokémon Orienteering stamp rally, where they must use their Pokémon to navigate through a course to get stamps at various stations. However, Bonnie and Pikachu get lost in the foggy woods and come across a mysterious Legendary Pokémon.
842	836	41	"Battling Into the Hall of Fame!" (Team Battle! The Hall of Fame Match!!); Transliteration: "Chīmu Batoru! Dentōiri Kessen!!" (Japanese: チームバトル！殿堂入り決戦！！)	September 4, 2014	November 1, 2014
After all of the activities at the Pokémon Summer Camp, Ash's team and Tierno's team have the same number of points. To settle the tie, all six will participate in a tag team match. Before the tag team match, they have to save Tierno, Shauna, and Trevor's Pokémon from Team Rocket's evil clutches.
843	837	42	"Origins of Mega Evolution!" (The Master Tower! The History of Mega Evolution!!); Transliteration: "Masutā Tawā! Megashinka no Rekishi!!" (Japanese: マスタータワー！メガシンカの歴史！！)	September 18, 2014	November 8, 2014
Before they have their Gym Battle, Ash and Korrina must stop Team Rocket after they have stolen a scroll on Mega Evolution from the Tower of Mastery.
844	838	43	"Showdown at the Shalour Gym!" (Shara Gym Battle! Pikachu vs. Mega Lucario!!); Transliteration: "Shara Jimu Sen! Pikachū Bui Esu Mega Rukario!!" (Japanese: シャラジム戦！ピカチュウVSメガルカリオ！！)	September 25, 2014	November 15, 2014
Ash challenges Korrina for the Shalour Gym's Rumble Badge using his Hawlucha, Fletchinder, and Pikachu. Hawlucha, Fletchinder, and Pikachu battle against Korrina's Mienfoo, Machoke, and Mega Lucario.
845	839	44	"Splitting Heirs!" (Citron Against Eureka!? The Nyaonix Sibling Battle!!); Transliteration: "Shitoron Tai Yurīka!? Nyaonikusu de Kyōdai Batoru!!" (Japanese: シトロン対ユリーカ！？ニャオニクスできょうだいバトル！！)	October 2, 2014	November 22, 2014
Bonnie and Clemont get into a fight after Bonnie wanders off to look for Chespin. They encounter two brothers and their Meowstic having a rivalry. This situation helps Clemont and Bonnie to strengthen their brother-sister relationship even more.
846	840	45	"The Clumsy Crier Quiets the Chaos!" (The Clutzy Pukurin vs. the Berserk Bohmander!!); Transliteration: "Dojikko Pukurin Bui Esu Bōsō Bōmanda!!" (Japanese: どじっこプクリンVS暴走ボーマンダ！！)	October 9, 2014	November 29, 2014
On their way to Coumarine City, the group goes to a Pokémon Center. Nurse Joy is assisted by a clumsy Wigglytuff. However, they all soon find themselves having to deal with a Salamence that has gone out of control thanks to Team Rocket. Wigglytuff is the only one who can save the day.
847	841	46	"Dreaming a Performer's Dream!" (Serena's First Capture!? Yancham vs. Fokko!!); Transliteration: "Serena, Hatsu Getto!? Yanchamu Bui Esu Fokko!!" (Japanese: セレナ、初ゲット！？ヤンチャムVSフォッコ！！)	October 16, 2014	December 6, 2014
After a Pancham disrupts a Pokémon Showcase and steals Ash's hat and Clemonts's glasses, Serena battles it with her Fennekin in an attempt to capture it and fulfil her own dream of becoming a great Pokémon Performer.
848	842	47	"A Campus Reunion!" (Citron's Campus Memories! The Shocking Reunion!!); Transliteration: "Shitoron, Omoide no Kyanpasu! Dengeki no Saikai!!" (Japanese: シトロン、想い出のキャンパス！電撃の再会！！)	October 23, 2014	December 13, 2014
Clemont returns to his old school. He relives his younger years and reminisces about a Shinx that he had befriended. Clemont was forced to leave Shinx behind after his graduation ceremony celebrations. When he reunites with it, Shinx has evolved into Luxio. Clemont tries to heal the rift that was created a few years ago.
849	843	48	"Bonnie for the Defense!" (Send Out the Laplace Guard! Go For It Eureka!!); Transliteration: "Shutsudō Rapurasu Bōeitai! Yurīka Ganbaru!!" (Japanese: 出動ラプラス防衛隊！ユリーカがんばる！！)	October 30, 2014	December 20, 2014
While walking by herself, Bonnie comes across 3 children named Heidi, Jay & Kye who are protecting an injured Lapras from adults. Bonnie soon joins them in protecting the Lapras from Team Rocket.

=== Special episodes ===
Jap. overall	Eng. overall	No. in season	English title Japanese title	Original release date	English air date
SP–5	SP–1	SP–1	"Pokémon: Mega Evolution Special I" (The Strongest Mega Evolution: Act I); Transliteration: "Saikyō Mega Shinka ~Act I~" (Japanese: 最強メガシンカ～Act I～)	April 3, 2014	May 31, 2014
Pokémon Trainer Alain wishes to battle every single Mega Evolution there is. He travels around the world to accomplish his goal. He first seeks out Elite Four member Siebold, who he has heard possesses a Mega Stone.

== Music ==
The Japanese opening songs are "V (Volt)" (V (ボルト), Boruto) by Yusuke, and an alternate version by Satoshi / Ash Ketchum (Rica Matsumoto) and J☆Dee'Z for 28 episodes, and "Mega (Volt)" (メガV (メガボルト), Megaboruto) performed by Yusuke for 21 episodes. The ending songs are "X Strait, Y Scenery" (X海峡Y景色, Ekkusu Kaikyō Wai Keshiki; "X-Kaikyō, Y-Keshiki") performed by J☆Dee'Z for 28 episodes, "Peace Smile!" (ピースマイル!, Pīsumairu!) performed by J☆Dee'Z with Pikachu (Ikue Ōtani) for 18 episodes, "DreamDream" (ドリドリ DoriDori) performed by Shoko Nakagawa for 3 episodes, and the English opening song is "Pokémon Theme (Version XY)", performed by Ben Dixon and The Sad Truth. Its instrumental version serves as the ending theme.

== Home media releases ==
Viz Media and Warner Home Video have released the series in the United States on two three-disc volume sets that contain 24 episodes each.

The first volume was released on August 4, 2015, and the second was released on January 19, 2016.

The complete season was released on June 11, 2024.
