= Serena (Pokémon) =

Pokémon protagonist

- Pokémon character
- Serena in Pokémon the Series: XY
- First game: Pokémon X and Y (2013)
- Created by: Satoshi Tajiri
- Designed by: Ken Sugimori Atsuko Nishida
- Voiced by: English: Haven Paschall (anime) Jackie Lastra (Pokémon Masters EX); Japanese: Mayuki Makiguchi (anime) Akari Kitō (Pokémon Masters EX)

In-universe information
- Occupation: Pokémon Performer; Pokémon Coordinator
- Home: Vaniville Town, Kalos

Serena (Japanese: セレナ) is a fictional character in the 2013 video game Pokémon X and Y. Players can choose to play as either her or the male protagonist Calem. She also appears in the Pokémon anime series, accompanying her childhood friend Ash Ketchum on his journey through the Kalos region. In the anime, she has a big crush on Ash and ultimately kisses him in a now-famous moment in Pokémon lore. As a result, Serena's character and the ship between her and Ash became popular among fans.

== Concept and creation ==
Developed by Game Freak and published by Nintendo, the Pokémon franchise began in Japan in 1996 with the release of the video games Pokémon Red and Blue for the Game Boy. In these games, the player assumes the role of a Pokémon Trainer whose goal is to capture and train creatures called Pokémon. Players use the creatures' special abilities to combat other Pokémon, both in the wild as well as those used by other Trainers. Serena was designed by Ken Sugimori for the Pokémon X and Y with input from Pokémon video game designer Junichi Masuda. Masuda chose France as the background for the Kalos region, which is the main setting in these games. During the Pokémon X and Y showcase at the Pokémon Game Show in August 2013, the character was named "Yvonne". This name was later used in the manga series.

She is voiced by Mayuki Makiguchi in Japanese. Makiguchi discussed her love of fashion helping make her empathize with Serena more, exclaiming that she has been learning to make sweets to get into character more. The kiss between Ash and Serena was intentionally censored, with the staff making it obvious Pokémon is watched by younger kids too so it should stay age-appropriate. Haven Paschall voices the character in the anime series in English. Jackie Lastra voices her in Pokémon Masters EX, while Akari Kitō voices her in Japanese.

== Appearances ==
Serena first appears in Pokémon X and Y as one of the two protagonists that can be played as, alongside the male protagonist Calem. She begins her Pokémon journey, receiving either a Chespin, Fennekin, or Froakie as her Starter Pokémon, with the goal of collecting all eight badges in the Kalos region and defeating the Elite Four to become the Pokémon League Champion. She has various friends, including Calem, who also gets one of the Starter Pokémon, as well as Tierno, Trevor, and Shauna, who all serve as her rivals. Throughout her Gym Badge journey, she also deals with the villainous Team Flare, led by Lysandre, and must stop him from getting the power to destroy those who oppose his vision of the world. She also captures either of the legendary Pokémon Xerneas or Yveltal, depending on if they played the X or Y version of the game. She eventually fights the Elite Four, including the Kalos League Champion Diantha, before finally defeating her. If the player chooses to play as Calem instead, Serena takes the role of a rival.

Serena also appears in the Pokémon anime series, where she acts as a travelling companion of Ash Ketchum in Pokémon the Series: XY. Prior to the start of the series, she met Ash at Professor Oak's Summer Camp in her youth, where he helped her recover after she was startled by a wild Poliwag. Due to this, she developed a crush on him, even though he never notices. She eventually recognizes him on a television broadcast during the series, and she meets up with him, though he does not initially remember her. Throughout the series, Serena has a goal of participating in Pokémon Showcases, female-only beauty-pageant-like competitions, to become the "Kalos Queen", a title for the best Pokémon Performer in the Kalos region. At the end of the series, she leaves for Hoenn, kissing Ash on the lips before departing. She later reappears in Pokémon Ultimate Journeys: The Series and briefly reunites with Ash before parting ways again.

She appears alongside Calem as a collectible trophy in Super Smash Bros. for Nintendo 3DS and Wii U, and later has her hat be an alternate costume for the Pokémon Jigglypuff in Super Smash Bros. Ultimate. A counterpart to the character, named Yvonne with the nickname "Y," appeared in Pokémon Adventures.

== Reception ==
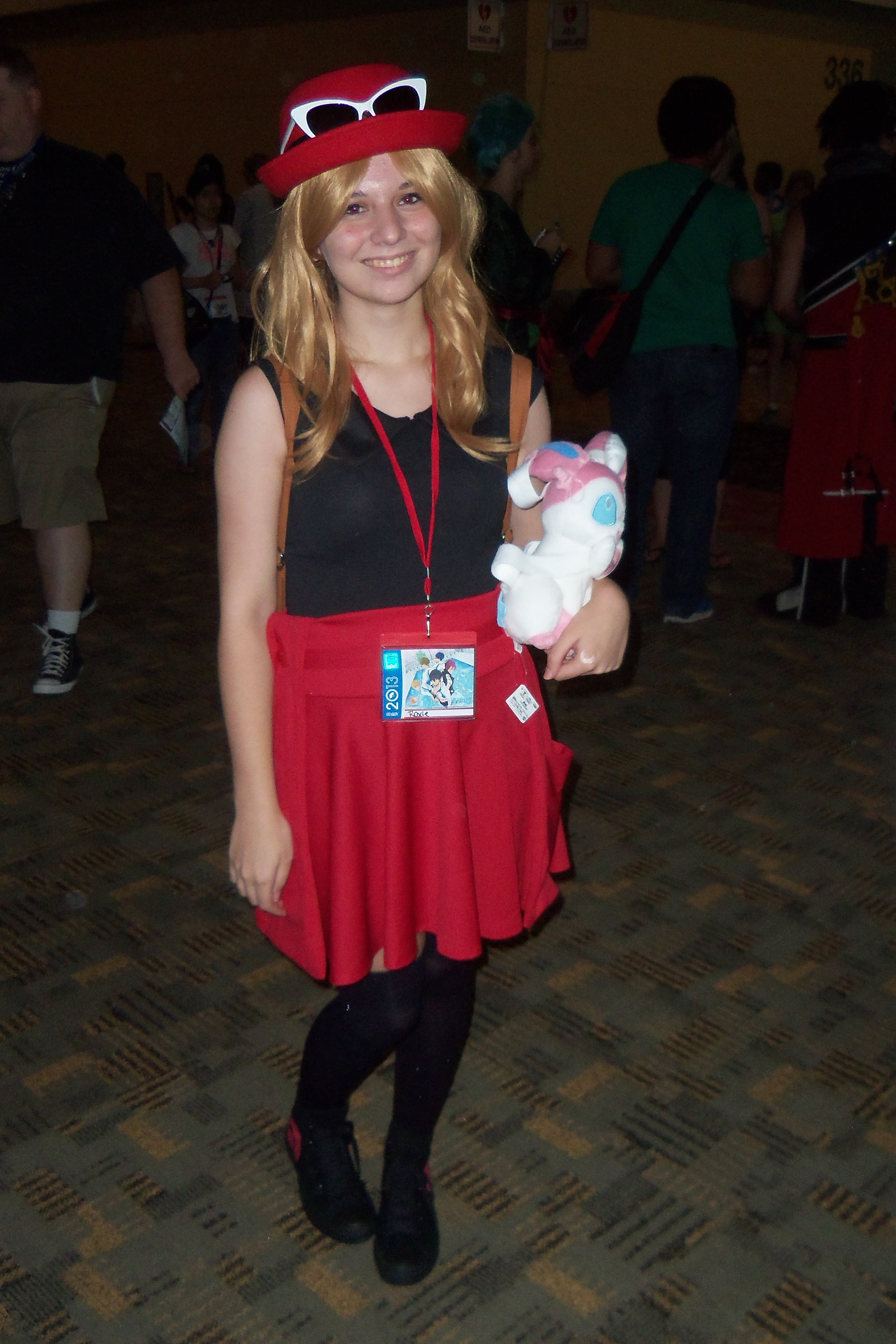
A Serena cosplay in August 2013.

Serena has received generally positive reception, identified as a popular character among fans of the Pokémon anime. Jose Otero from IGN talks about Serena representing females and Calem representing males, saying, "it actually looks more interesting when they become rival characters for the player." Victoria McNally from The Mary Sue appreciates the presence of Serena's character in X and Y, which is considered to represent female players by providing options to change hairstyles and clothing styles. Dexerto writer Laura Grey noted various qualities that made her so popular, including her challenging stereotypes and "genuine nature and determination." Inside Games writer Sawasdee Otsuka felt that the customization of characters in X and Y influenced players' enjoyment of them, particularly Serena, noting that players seemed to become more interested in playing as her due to the fashion mechanic. Japanese celebrity Shoko Nakagawa cut her hair short, attributing it to Serena cutting her hair short in the anime. In the July 2023 issue of Animedia magazine, Serena was ranked by readers as the fifth most popular female anime character of all time.

The kiss between Serena and Ash was the subject of discussion, particularly how it was designed to be less explicit.

The ship between Serena and Ash has been the subject of discussion among fans and critics. The relationship between Serena and Ash has created a fan community of people who ship them together, with the ship name being called "AmourShipping" or "SatoSere" (Japanese: サトセレ), with speculation being made that Serena and Ash would end up together. Polygon writer Allegra Frank also discussed the shipping community behind the two, believing that the fact that Serena seemed to actually love him set her apart from other common ships with Ash, such as Misty and May. Screen Rant writer Samantha King felt that Serena was the true love for Ash, arguing that he has shown no real romantic interactions with anyone except Serena and that the more recent episodes with Misty dashed hopes for that ship due to it being presented platonically. Comic Book Resources writer Joe Ballard agreed with this sentiment, arguing that Misty being quick to anger and mock Ash did not work as well for Ash, where Serena's gentle personality balanced well with Ash's excitable personality.

Serena is the first and only female character implied to have kissed Ash on the lips. (Note: There are three other female characters who have kissed Ash, but only on the cheek: Jessie in episode 22 of the first season titled "Abra and the Psychic Showdown", Melody in Pokémon: The Movie 2000, and Bianca from Pokémon Heroes.) Hobby Consolas writer Jesús Vicario Rodríguez noting how some fans have disliked the way the scene was handled due to not being able to see the kiss. Inside Games writer Nennetaro noted how excited the kiss between them made a lot of fans, discussing how Serena is a rare character in the series due to her explicit affection for Ash. Following her departure in the Pokémon anime, some fans demanded that she return to accompany Ash in the next series. Allegra Frank suggested that the way that the kiss is obscured makes it more suggestive than kisses on the cheek Ash has received in past episodes, arguing that it was a scene special to both Ash and people who viewed the two as a prospective couple. The kiss scene between Ash and Serena has been utilized on social media by the Pokémon Company International in commemoration of Valentine's Day twice, in 2018 and 2020; the company separately utilized it a third time on May 31, 2021. The kiss also regularly ranks high in the annual "Kiss Day" poll conducted by the popular Anime! Anime! news website.

Her return to the series was in high demand compared to other characters, with a Change.org petition calling for her return receiving more than 26,000 signatures. According to an IT Media reader poll, Serena was the most popular female character in the series, receiving more than a quarter of the vote, with many commenters expressing disappointment that she was removed from the anime. While discussing the prospects of her returning, Comic Book Resources writer Ryan McCarthy argued that, despite the popularity of such a request, she likely would not return in a major capacity. He argued that if she did, the kiss would have to be addressed, which would detract from the emphasis on adventure to focus on romance, which he believed would not fit the tone of the show. Serena's eventual return to the anime was criticized by Game Rant writer Levana Jane Chester-Londt, arguing that the limited amount of interaction between Ash and Serena was disappointing.

Overall, the episode featuring Serena's return to the anime in Pokémon Journeys was very warmly received. According to a Nicolive anime survey conducted among Japanese viewers immediately following the episode's broadcast, 88.4 percent of viewers gave it the highest rating, ultimately ranking it as the 4th highest-rated episode of the Pokémon Journeys series (9th if the episodes from the Pokémon: To Be a Pokémon Master epilogue miniseries are included).
