= Ash Ketchum =

Protagonist of the Pokémon anime

- Pokémon character
- Ash Ketchum as depicted in the first five seasons of the anime
- First appearance: "Pokémon, I Choose You!" (1997)
- Last appearance: "The Rainbow and the Pokémon Master!" (2023)
- Designed by: Atsuko Nishida
- Voiced by: English: Veronica Taylor (Seasons 1–8); Sarah Natochenny (Season 9–25); Japanese: Rica Matsumoto; Hana Takeda (Child)

In-universe information
- Home: Pallet Town, Kanto

Ash Ketchum, known as Satoshi (サトシ) in Japan, is a character in the Pokémon franchise owned by Nintendo, Game Freak, and Creatures. He was the protagonist of the Pokémon anime for the first 25 seasons, as well as the protagonist of several manga series. In Japanese, the character is voiced by Rica Matsumoto. In the English dub, he was voiced by Veronica Taylor in the first eight seasons and Sarah Natochenny afterwards. Ash is a young boy who travels with various companions, aiming to fulfill his dream to become a Pokémon Master; his Pokémon lineup constantly changes over the course of the series, with its sole constant member being Pikachu, Ash's first Pokémon. Ash is loosely based on Red, the player character from the Generation I games Pokémon Red and Blue. Satoshi Tajiri, the creator of Pokémon, has stated that Ash represents the "human aspect" of the series, and that Ash reflects what he himself was like as a child.

Ash has been criticized for being stuck in a "floating timeline", as well as for his long-lasting inability to win many major Pokémon League competitions in the series. However, his longevity and persistence have also been positively received, and his character has received attention for teaching important and relatable lessons to children. Ash ultimately became Alola League Champion in Pokémon the Series: Sun & Moon – Ultra Legends, and World Champion in Pokémon Ultimate Journeys: The Series.

Due to the huge popularity, success, and longevity of the Pokémon anime series around the world since its debut, Ash has gone on to become one of the most well-known and recognizable fictional characters of all time. He is considered a pop culture icon and a figurehead character of the wave of anime in the late 1990s. He has been used extensively in merchandise for the series.

== Conception and design ==
Ash was designed by Atsuko Nishida, and named after creator Satoshi Tajiri. The character was designed to represent how Tajiri was as a child, obsessed with catching bugs. During localization of both for North American audiences, the character's name was changed in the anime to "Ash Ketchum", the first name taken from one of the possible default names players could select for the player character in Pokémon Red and Blue, and the surname tying into the tagline for the series, "Gotta catch 'em all!". He is loosely based on Red, the player character of Pokémon Red and Blue.

Tajiri noted in an interview that between Japanese and US reactions to the series, Japanese consumers focused on the character Pikachu, while the US purchased more items featuring Ash and Pikachu, his Pokémon, together. He stated that he felt the character represented the human aspect of the franchise, and was thus a necessity. The character was given a rival named Gary Oak (Shigeru Okido in the Japanese version, after Tajiri's idol/mentor Shigeru Miyamoto), loosely based on Red's rival Blue. In an interview Tajiri noted the contrast between the characters' relationship in the games and anime; while in the games they were rivals, in the anime, Shigeru represented Satoshi's master. When asked if Satoshi would equal or surpass Shigeru, Tajiri replied "No! Never!" Ash's character design was initially overseen by Sayuri Ichishi, replaced by Toshiya Yamada during the Diamond & Pearl series of the anime. Ash received a redesign in the Best Wishes! series, which included larger brown irises. In the XY series, he received minor changes, such as a decrease in the size of the thunderbolt-shaped "birthmarks" on his cheeks. Ash received a major design overhaul for the Sun & Moon anime series.

=== Voice actors ===
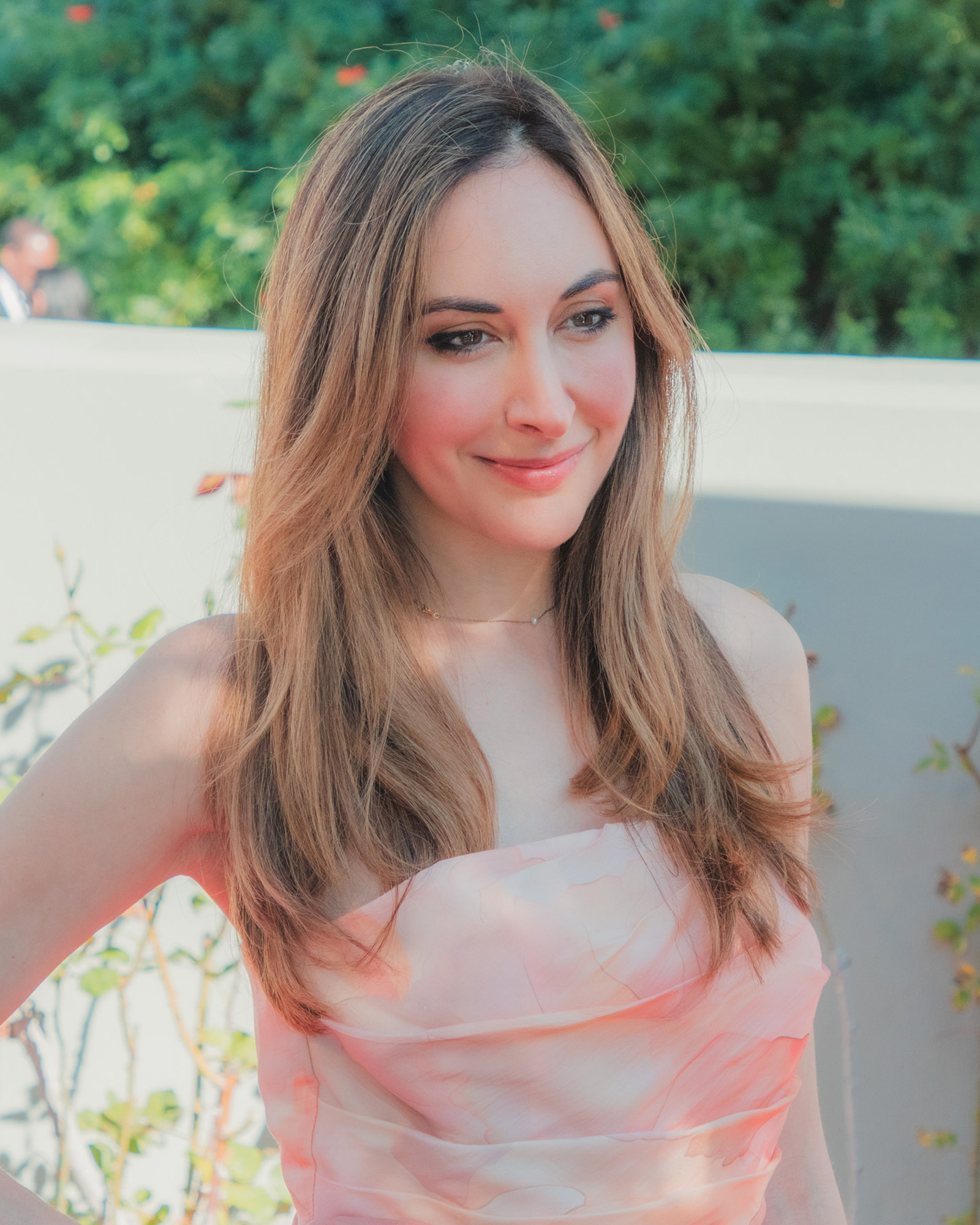
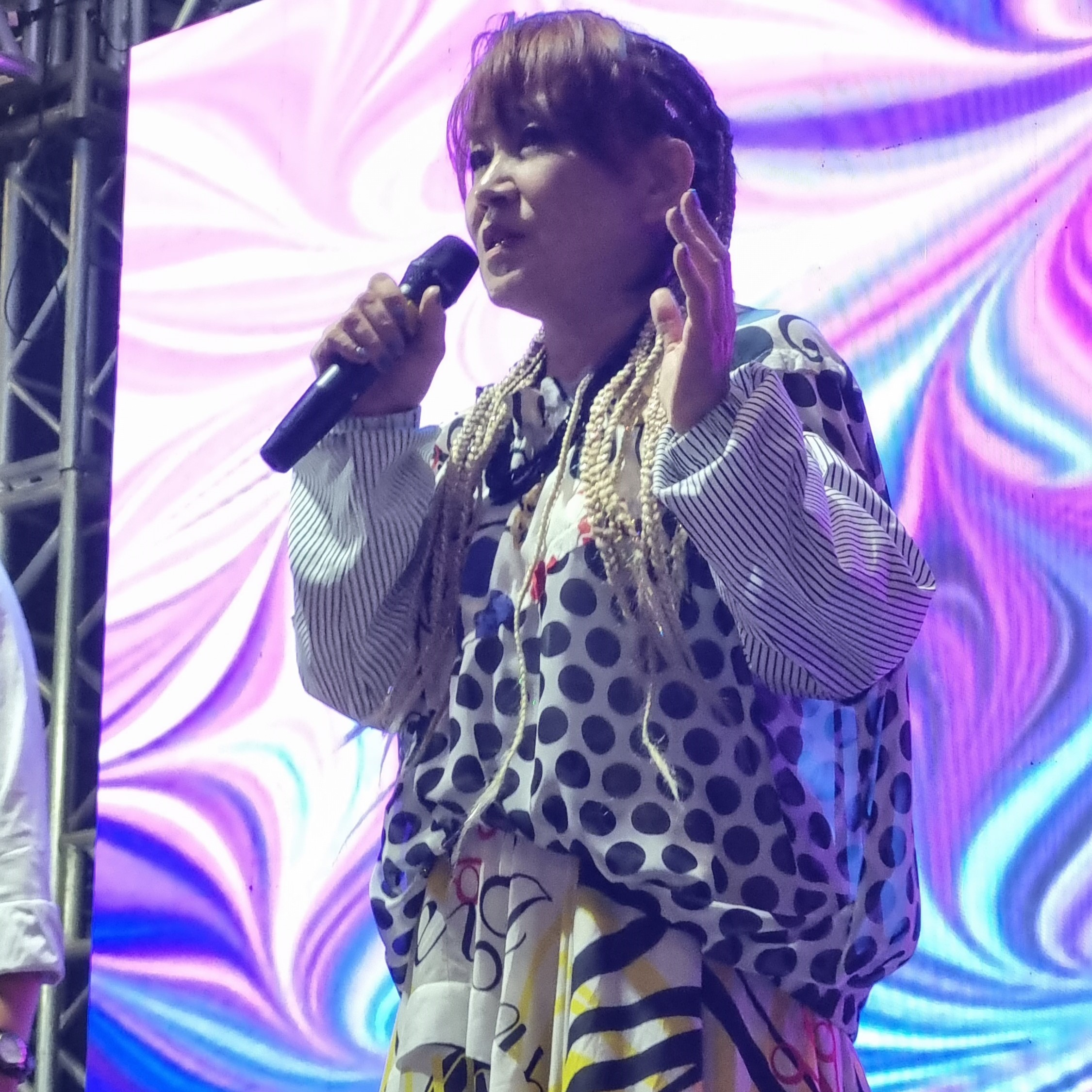
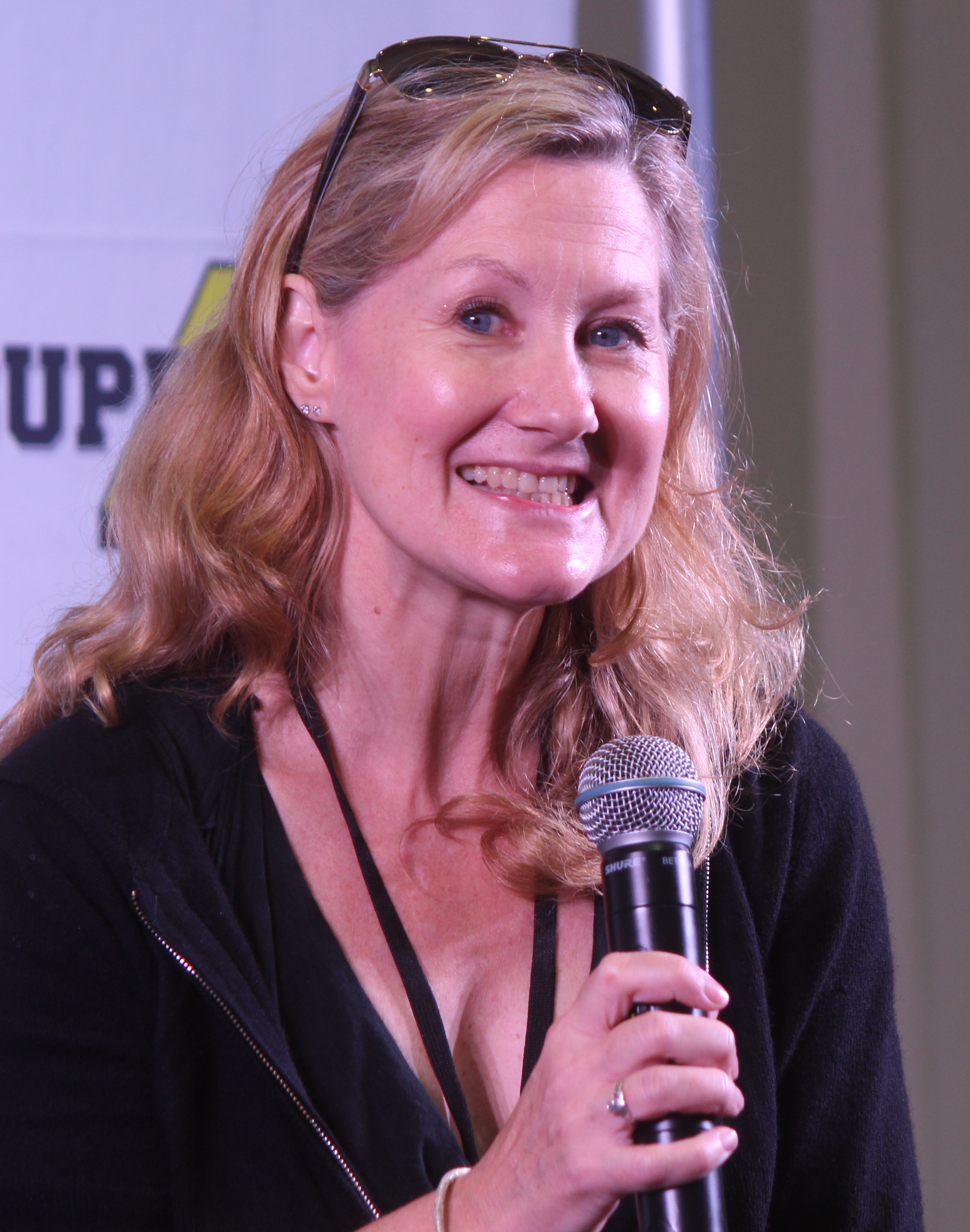
(From left to right) Ash has been portrayed by Sarah Natochenny, Rica Matsumoto, and Veronica Taylor.

In Japan, Rica Matsumoto has provided the original Japanese voice of Ash since the series' start. Matsumoto highlighted a past experience in which she recorded a message for a hospitalized child as the character, which she stated caused her to feel "more aware of the work I was putting out there." This caused her to change her approach to voicing the character. Her role has been considered highly iconic. Matsumoto voiced Ash as a kind character, and stated that she did not stray away from that portrayal in her performance, even under special circumstances. Hana Takeda briefly voiced the role in Pokémon Journeys: The Series, portraying Ash when he was a child.

For the English dubbing, Veronica Taylor provided the voice of Ash in the first eight seasons of the Pokémon anime, which was dubbed by 4Kids Entertainment. At the time of her audition, Taylor stated that the character was temporarily named Casey. After the script was translated from Japanese, the lines were adapted to fit the movements of the character's mouth (called lip flap). All the voices were recorded separately, so Taylor was the only one in the booth when she recorded her lines, which took approximately six to eight hours per episode. Taylor was often the first person to record, so she had to "imagine how the previous line will be said". A director worked with Taylor to help with interpretation of the line, as well as matching with the lip flap and voice consistency. Taylor enjoyed playing Ash because of his "low, husky voice" and "energy and excitement". Taylor was first introduced to the role via a brief voice clip from the Japanese airing. The job moved quickly, and Taylor's past acting experience allowed her to embody the role in the time allotted for recording.

Taylor commented that Ash and the other characters "loosened up" after the first ten episodes of the anime; she believed the writers were more relaxed and no longer felt the pressure of making sure everything was done correctly. Taylor commented: "I enjoy playing Ash now much more than I did in the very beginning because I can have fun with him more, and we kind of know him and can work out how he really would react. We have the classic Ash responses and things like that." Sarah Natochenny replaced Taylor in season nine when The Pokémon Company International (known at that time as Pokémon USA) took over the licensing, prompting a shift in recording studios. Natochenny has cited Matsumoto's performance as inspiration for her performance as Ash.

== Appearances ==
=== In the anime ===
Ash first appears in the anime's first episode, "Pokémon, I Choose You!". The episode takes place on Ash's tenth birthday as he wakes up late to receive his first Pokémon, resulting in the Professor, Oak, giving Ash a rebellious Pikachu. Ash and Pikachu bond after Pikachu saves Ash from an angry Spearow flock, and the pair become close friends. Ash acts as the main character of every series of the anime up until Pokémon Horizons: The Series.

Ash travels with many traveling companions throughout the series, starting with the characters Brock and Misty in the first season. His companions tend to rotate throughout the series, as do his Pokémon, with Ash tending to leave most of his Pokémon (barring Pikachu) in Oak's care when he visits a new region. Ash also comes into conflict with the criminal organization Team Rocket, primarily in the form of Jessie, James, and their talking Meowth. While the trio are primarily depicted as comic relief, they often attempt to capture Pikachu in various schemes in order to send it to their boss, Giovanni. Ash also frequently goes up against "rival" characters, such as his former childhood best friend, Gary Oak.

Ash's main goal is to become a "Pokémon Master", and as a result often attempts to defeat the Pokémon League – a competition of the strongest Trainers in a given region – in whatever region he is in. Though his attempts are typically unsuccessful, he eventually succeeds in becoming a regional Champion in Pokémon the Series: Sun & Moon – Ultra Legends, and later dethrones Leon as the "Monarch" of the Pokémon World Coronation tournament in Pokémon Ultimate Journeys: The Series, being recognized as the strongest Pokémon Trainer in the world.

=== In the video games and manga ===
Ash appeared in Pokémon Puzzle League, acting as the game's main playable character. In Pokémon Sun and Moon's demo, the player receives a letter from Ash, along with his Greninja, which is capable of assuming its "Ash-Greninja" form through its ability Battle Bond. Ash also makes a cameo in the Abandoned Thrifty Megamart location in the main game, where a blurry photo of him and his Pikachu is plastered on a wall in the back room. Ash later appeared as an unlockable Sync Pair in Pokémon Masters EX, where he is paired with Pikachu.

Ash appeared in the manga series The Electric Tale of Pikachu and Ash & Pikachu, which follow similar plots to the main anime. Manga author Toshihiro Ono cited Ash as one of his favorite characters to draw for the series, stating, "I want to go on a trip with Misty just like him! (And forget about job, rent, etc.)".

== Critical reception ==
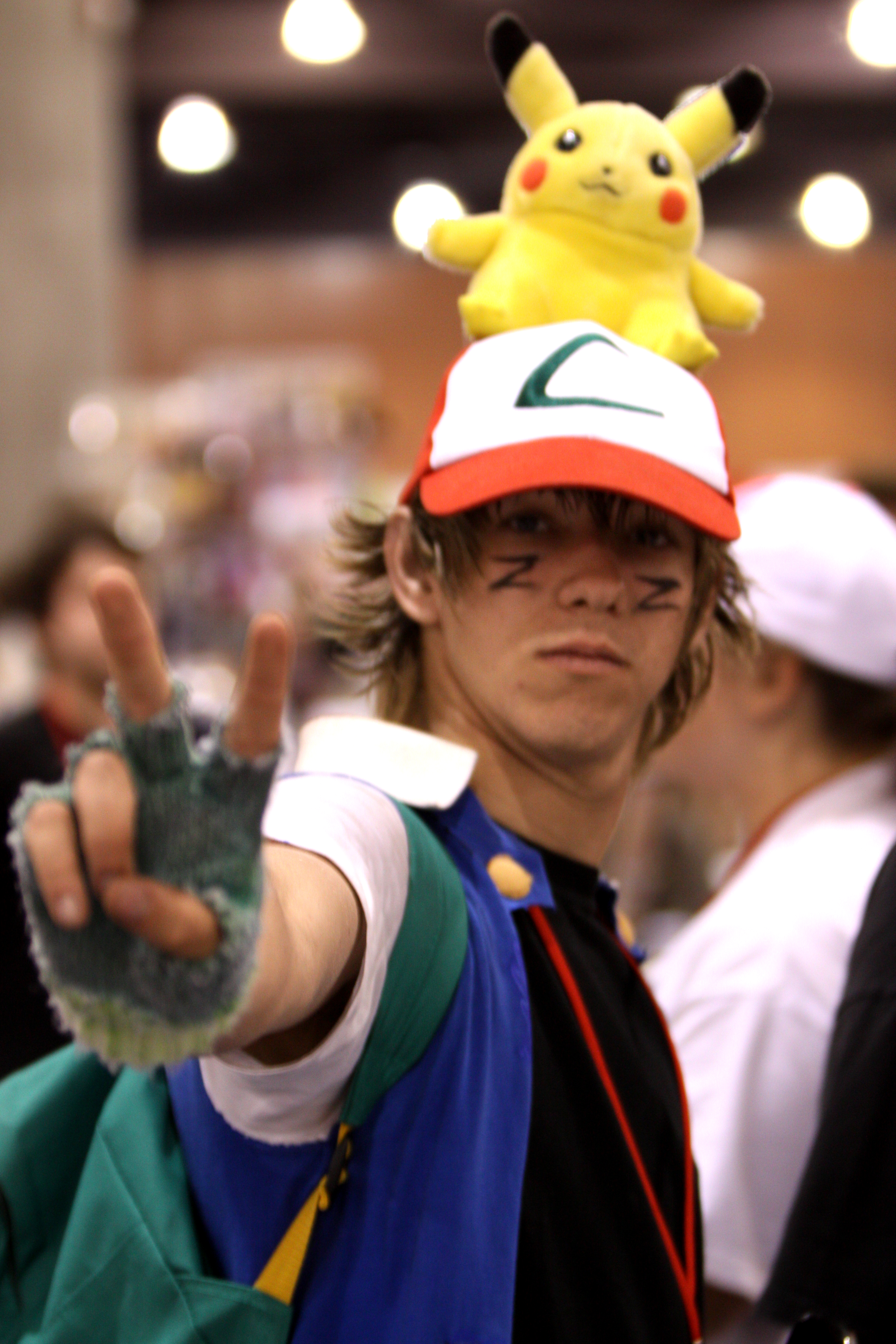
Ash Ketchum is a popular and enduring character among fans of the series.

The book The Japanification of Children's Popular Culture cited Ash as an example of cultural identification, with the character going through similar motions players of the games had to in order to progress through them. It additionally emphasized the character's growth and development as the anime series progressed. The Guinness Book of World Records 2011 Gamer's Edition lists Ash as coming 37th out of 50 in a readers' poll of their favorite video game characters. Ash has been described as a "truly admirable hero" who develops as the show goes along, with his willingness to delay his own goals in favor of helping others being highlighted.

Ash's role in the anime has received a positive response overall. IGN, in a retrospective for the series, highlighted how Ash's divergence from the games helped the anime come into its own as a series. They described Ash's character as "trustworthy and reliable" and his role in the series as "comforting". His friendship with his Pokémon has also been highlighted as a part of his appeal, being compared to Aristotle's virtues of friendship. Pikachu saving Ash from the Spearow flock in the first episode helped to establish "a level of equality" between the two characters, highlighting the idea of how a reciprocal friendship helped ensure further success. Their "symbiotic" relationship was described as a reason for the "personal flourishing" of Ash as a character. His interactions with his friends and companions have also been described as having helped build the dramatic core of the series as a whole. The relationship between Serena and Ash has also created a fan community of people who ship them together, with the ship name being called "AmourShipping," with speculation being made that Serena and Ash would end up together.

Ash has also garnered praise for serving as a role-model to children by sources such as Business Insider Australia and the BBC. Kat Bailey, writing for VG247, highlighted this as a part of both Ash and the Pokémon anime's success, stating that "Pokémon set out to teach kids the meaning of fair play, good sportsmanship, and perseverance. Whenever Ash got knocked down, he would pick himself up again, dust himself off, and keep doggedly pursuing his goals." Ash's defeat in his first tournament was praised, due to his inability to raise his Charizard resulting in his loss. It was highlighted as both teaching a valuable and relatable lesson to children watching the show, as well as allowing them to become further invested in Ash's character in order to see if "he'd become good enough to win next time."

Ash's role in the series has also been criticized. The character's constant losses were highlighted by IGN, who stated that, "The Pokemon show has become so successful and been so consistent for so long that it's like its hero is never, ever going to be allowed to actually finish what he started. If Ash ever won, it'd be over. If he ever actually became a League Champion in the series, that would be it. The end. How could the story go on? It couldn't. And so every time he gets close, the writers make sure he falls short." They also criticized the "floating timeline" the character was stuck in. Ash's journey never ending was also criticized due to its formula being unable to reach "a proper conclusion". However, Ash's constant setbacks have also been met positively, being highlighted as a way to teach relatable stories and lessons to children. Daniel Dockery, commenting on Ash's departure from the series while writing for Polygon, highlighted this inability to win as a central part of Ash's character, believing it to be a valuable lesson that was "relatable for everything from going to a new, unfamiliar school to experiencing defeat in a sport". They stated that Ash's indefinite style of journeying provided a sense of comfort to returning fans, while also symbolizing the Pokémon series' core themes. The book Monster Kids: How Pokémon Taught a Generation to Catch Em All, highlighted Ash's role, citing him as a constant and comforting companion to viewers due to his longevity, and as being a character that "each new generation of Pokémon fans could relate to."

The character's farewell from the series drew a massive response, with the hashtag "#ThankYouAshAndPikachu" trending on Twitter following the announcement of the character's departure from the series. GamesRadar+ highlighted Ash's significant impact on the series, stating that "New Pokemon might grace my screen, but Ash and Pikachu would be an unchanging presence, anchoring not only the show, but the entire franchise. It won't matter in a big way, but I'm quietly devastated that now, they won't be there anymore." Kenneth Sheperd, writing for Kotaku, wrote about Ash's longevity as a character and his influence over many generations of children, highlighting his departure as a sad one. He stated that "For fans, myself included, Ash symbolizes learning about who you are in a world that feels vast and unknowable at a young age, and that the journey to learn about this world is best taken together. I don't know many people who watched Ash's story unfold in its entirety, but every Pokémon fan I know has taken that spirit with them as they've embarked on their own journeys." It drew minor criticism, with Polygon highlighting the retirement of the character as "evolution by forced means of companies seeking a branding revamp rather than the conclusion of a satisfying and coherent emotional arc". The Radio Times cited, however, that the change was a positive one, as despite Ash's iconicity, "If Ash can't grow, how can the show itself evolve and develop? It's admirable how long Pokémon has managed to recycle the same themes and ideas, but even with new generations of cute little pocket monsters to catch, there's only so long we could have watched Ash lose his tournaments over and over again."
