= Shoko Nakagawa =

Japanese singer (born 1985)

- 中川 翔子
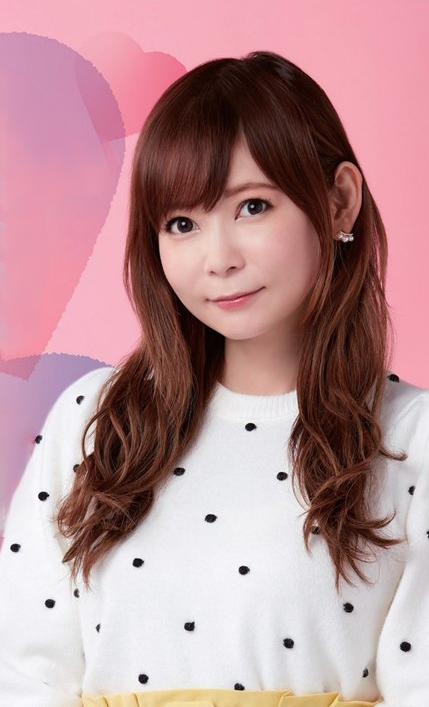
- Nakagawa in 2021
- Born: Shiyōko Nakagawa; May 5, 1985 (age 41); Nakano, Tokyo, Japan
- Other name: Shokotan (しょこたん)
- Occupations: Media personality; actress; voice actress; singer; cartoonist; model
- Years active: 1990–present
- Agent: Miracle
- Spouse: Unknown (m. 2023)
- Children: 2
- Father: Katsuhiko Nakagawa
- Musical career
- Genres: J-pop; rock; Anison
- Instrument: Vocals
- Years active: 2001–present
- Label: Sony Records
- Website: www.shokotan.jp

Shoko Nakagawa (中川 翔子, Nakagawa Shōko; born May 5, 1985) is a Japanese media personality, singer, actress, voice actress, illustrator, YouTuber, and cosplayer. Also known by her nickname Shokotan (しょこたん), she is best known as the presenter of Pokémon Sunday, and as the performer of the opening theme from the anime Gurren Lagann.

== Biography ==
Born and raised in Tokyo metropolitan area to her father, Katsuhiko Nakagawa, actor and musician, and her mother Keiko Nakagawa, a great-granddaughter of Kazutaka Ito, who is known for introducing and promoting the salmon and trout hatchery business. Her father died of leukemia on September 17, 1994 when she was 9. Nakagawa found escape from bullies by connecting with Pokémon when she was in 5th grade. "When I was a kid, I didn't have friends, but I did have Pokémon."

In the 2006 book Shokotan Manual (しょこ☆まにゅ, Shoko Manyu), she wrote that her legal name was Shiyōko (しようこ) rather than Shōko (しょうこ), which she had been using for most of her life. At the time of her birth, she and her mother had to remain in the hospital, and her maternal aunt was left with registering her in the koseki. Her mother's intended name of "Shōko" (薔子) was declined due to 薔 not being included in the list of jōyō kanji or jinmeiyō kanji that are approved for use in Japanese names. The aunt wrote Shōko (しょうこ) in hiragana instead, but because she wrote very quickly, the small yo appeared larger than intended and the name was recorded as Shiyōko (しようこ).

== Career ==
She made her entertainment debut in 2001, winning the Grand Prix award at the Popolo Girl Audition and representing Jackie Chan talent agency. Later, on the "Yume-Ga-Oka Residence" programme on SKY PerfecTV!, she was given Jackie Chan's photobook by Midorikawa Shobō, who were guests on the show. She commented "I thought he was an enemy of Bruce Lee's", apparently referring to Enter the Dragon.

In 2002, she was chosen as Miss Shōnen Magazine.

Her official blog, Shokotan * Blog, opened in 2004, and by April 2006 it had received a total of 100 million hits. On February 2, 2008, the daily Japanese newspaper Mainichi Shimbun reported that her blog had been accessed 1 billion times.

In 2004, she made a guest appearance in the 38th episode of Tokusou Sentai Dekaranger, after having previously appeared as a child in Chikyuu Sentai Fiveman. She later appeared with Katsumura on Men B.

She appeared in a brief section of "Kangaeru Hito" ("People who think") on the Fuji TV network in 2004 as an illustrator, after which she appeared regularly on the later version of the programme which started with minor changes in early 2005, "Kangaeru Hitokoma" ("Thinking about one frame [of a cartoon strip]"). On the Fuji TV show Kangaeru Hitokoma, on which she is an occasional guest, she drew in the style of Kazuo Umezu.

For one year starting in May 2005, Nakagawa appeared as a regular on the TBS programme "Ōsama no Brunch". In July 2006, she released her debut single "Brilliant Dream". It entered the Oricon chart at number 29, with initial sales of 6313 copies. Nakagawa performed at Anime Expo 2008 at the Los Angeles Convention Center. Some of her work was shown on May 11, edition of Downtown Deluxe on Nippon TV network, Nakagawa was a member of the judging panel in the "Jump Damashii" section of the Shūeisha publication Weekly Shōnen Jump, starting from Jump number 13 of 2006.

On May 30, 2006, airing of Kasupe!, in the section entitled Fuji Ginkō Geinōjin Satei-Gakari (フジ銀行 芸能人査定係), "Fuji Bank Celebrity Evaluator", it was discovered that she liked the manga Kachō Shima Kōsaku, eliciting a comment from the host, Sayaka Aoki, that she had pretty "grown-up tastes".

In 2009, she opened a store called "mmts" with the theme of her hobby in Nakano Broadway.

In 2009–2010, she appeared in a series of commercials for Norton AntiVirus.

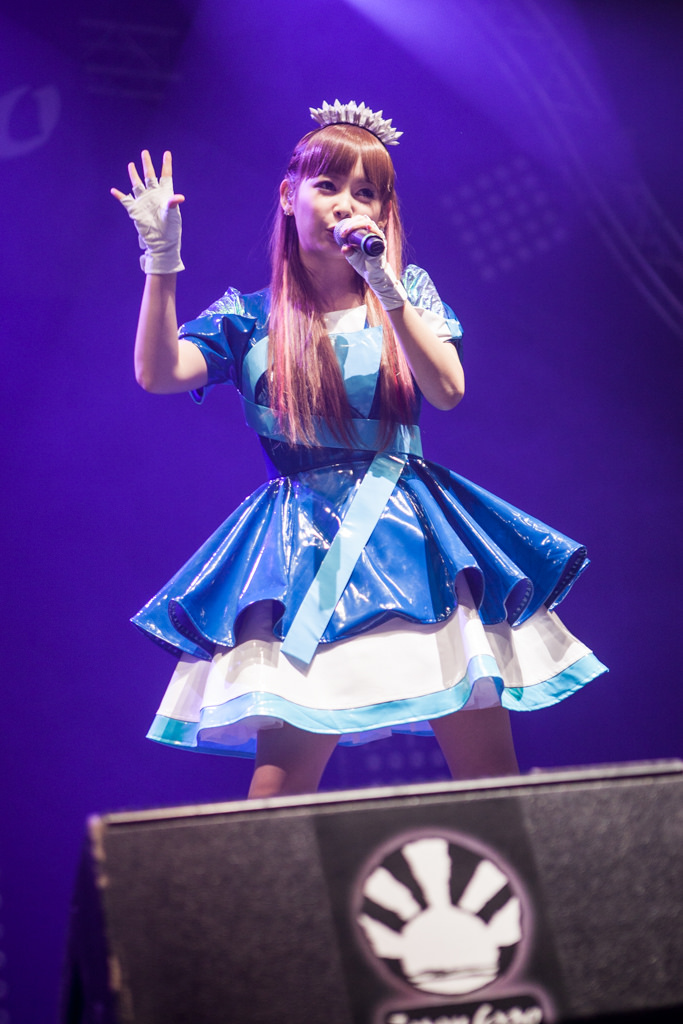
Nakagawa performing at the 2014 Japan Expo

In March 2014, Nakagawa's book of autobiographical essays, Neko no Ashiato ("Cats' Pawprints"), was published by Magazine House.

In March 2015, the book was adapted as an anime series titled Omakase Mamitasu ("Leave It to Mamitasu") on NHK, which featured characters based on Nakagawa's cat and her late father and grandfather.

In 2018, Nakagawa returned to Anime Expo to perform as part of Anisong World Matsuri.

In 2019, Nakagawa performed the song "Kaze to Issho ni" (風といっしょに) with Sachiko Kobayashi, which was used as the theme song to the theatrical film Mewtwo Strikes Back: Evolution; it is a cover of a song originally performed by Kobayashi, which was used as the theme song to the 1998 film Pokémon: The First Movie.

In 2020 following the temporary loss of work due to COVID-19 pandemic was a turning point, and she started distributing videos on YouTube, separate from the channel that distributes music videos set up by the office. Since then, her blog has hardly been updated.

In 2021, she posted her swimsuit video on YouTube, and she became very popular with over 10 million views in two months.

In October 2023, Nakagawa released the single "65535", the title song of which was used as the opening theme to the anime series 16bit Sensation: Another Layer. The following day, she announced that she legally changed her name to be the same as her stage name.

In addition to announcing her pregnancy on May 5, 2025, she also announced the launch of her own agency, "miracle." She has a business partnership with Watanabe Entertainment.

== Personal life ==
On April 28, 2023, Nakagawa announced her marriage to a non-celebrity man.

On May 5, 2025, on her 40th birthday, Nakagawa announced that she was pregnant with her first child. On October 1, 2025, she announced through her official social media account that she and her husband welcomed the birth of their first child, twin sons, on September 30.

== Filmography ==
=== TV ===
- AX MUSIC-TV 00 (2003–2004)
- Pokémon Sunday (ポケモン☆サンデー, Pokemon☆Sandē) (2006–2010)
- Tokusou Sentai Dekaranger (特捜戦隊デカレンジャー, Tokusō Sentai Dekarenjā) (2004) as Falupian Yaako (guest appearance) Episode 38
- Isshukan no Koi (一週間の恋) (2006)
- Hou no Niwa (法の庭) (2007)
- Honto ni Atta Kowai Hanashi (ほんとにあった怖い話) (2007)
- Shūmatsu no Cinderella Sekai! Dangan Traveler (週末のシンデレラ 世界!弾丸トラベラー, Shūmatsu-no-shinderera Sekai! DanganToraberā) (2007–2012)
- Waraiga Ichiban (笑いがいちばん, Waraiga Ichiban) (2007–2010)
- Anmitsu Hime (あんみつ姫) (2008)
- Anmitsu Hime 2 (あんみつ姫2) (2009)
- Pokémon Smash! (ポケモンスマッシュ！, Pokemon Sumasshu!) (2010–2013)
- Pokémon Get TV (ポケモンゲット☆TV, Pokemon Getto Terebi) (2013–2015)
- Gunshi Kanbei (軍師官兵衛) (2014) as Okita
- Mare (まれ) (2015)
- Meet Up at the Pokémon House? (ポケモンの家あつまる?, Pokémon no Uchi Atsumaru?) (2015–present)
- Yuusha Yoshihiko to Michibikareshi 7-nin (勇者ヨシヒコと導かれし七人) (2016)
- Anata no Koto wa sore hodo (あなたのことはそれほど) (2017)
- Tokyo Vampire Hotel (東京ヴァンパイアホテル) (2017)

=== Films ===
- Kabuto-O Beetle (2005)
- Umezu Kazuo: Kyofu Gekijo – Zesshoku (2005)
- Koala Kacho / Executive Koala (2005)
- The Fast and the Furious: Tokyo Drift (2006)
- X-Cross (2007)
- Gothic Lolita Battle Bear (2013)

=== Stageplays ===
- Maybe Happy Ending (2020)

=== Anime ===
Year	Title	Role	Note
2005	Eyeshield 21	Suzuna Taki	
2012	Saint Seiya Omega	Saori Kido / Athena	
2013	Dragon Ball Z: Battle of Gods	Oracle Fish	Film
2013	Majocco Shimai no Yoyo to Nene	Bahiku	
2015	Dragon Ball Z: Resurrection 'F'	Oracle Fish	Film
2015	Pretty Guardian Sailor Moon Crystal Season II	Diana	ONA; Black Moon arc
2015	Dragon Ball Super	Oracle Fish	
2016	Pretty Guardian Sailor Moon Crystal Season III	Diana	TV Anime; Death Busters arc
2017	Akiba's Trip: The Animation	Risa Deiba	
2021	Pretty Guardian Sailor Moon Eternal The Movie	Diana	2-Part film Season 4 of Sailor Moon Crystal (Dead Moon arc)
2023	Junji Ito Maniac: Japanese Tales of the Macabre	Mayumi Santo	ONA
2023	Pretty Guardian Sailor Moon Cosmos The Movie	Diana	2-Part film Season 5 of Sailor Moon Crystal (Shadow Galactica arc)

=== Pokémon films ===
- Nakagawa also has voiced characters in every Pokémon movie since 2007 (except Pokémon the Movie: Genesect and the Legend Awakened and Pokémon: Mewtwo Strikes Back—Evolution):

Year	Title	Role
2007	Pokémon: The Rise of Darkrai	Maki
2008	Pokémon: Giratina & the Sky Warrior	Infy
2009	Pokémon: Arceus and the Jewel of Life	Notched-Ear Pichu
2010	Pokémon: Zoroark: Master of Illusions	Proof
2011	Pokémon the Movie: Black—Victini and Reshiram and White—Victini and Zekrom	Aude
2012	Pokémon the Movie: Kyurem vs. the Sword of Justice	Keldeo
2014	Pokémon the Movie: Diancie and the Cocoon of Destruction	Millis Steele
2015	Pokémon the Movie: Hoopa and the Clash of Ages	Mary
2016	Pokémon the Movie: Volcanion and the Mechanical Marvel	Racel
2017	Pokémon the Movie: I Choose You!	Nurse Joy
2018	Pokémon the Movie: The Power of Us	Riku
2020	Pokémon the Movie: Secrets of the Jungle	Karen

=== Video games ===
- Dragon Quest Heroes (2015) – Alena
- Dragon Quest Heroes II (2016) – Alena
- Toukiden 2 (2016) – Gwen
- Itadaki Street: Dragon Quest and Final Fantasy 30th Anniversary (2017) – Alena
- Kingdom Hearts III (2019) – Rapunzel

=== Japanese dub ===
==== Live-action ====
- Moon Geun-young
  - Innocent Steps – Jang Chae-min
  - My Little Bride – Bo-eun
- Silent Hill (2006) – Alessa Gillespie (voice-over for Jodelle Ferland)
- Transformers: Age of Extinction (2014) – Tessa Yeager (voice-over for Nicola Peltz)
- Ra.One (2015) – Desi/Dawsal (voice-over for Priyanka Chopra)
- Venom (2018) – Anne Weying (voice-over for Michelle Williams)
- Venom: Let There Be Carnage (2021) – Anne Weying (voice-over for Michelle Williams)

==== Animation ====
- Tangled The Series (2017–2020) – Rapunzel
- Tangled (2010) – Rapunzel
- Ralph Breaks the Internet (2018) – Rapunzel
- Puss in Boots: The Last Wish (2023) – Goldilocks

== Discography ==
=== Albums ===
==== Studio albums ====
Title	Album details	Peak chart positions	Sales
Title	Album details	JPN	Sales
Big Bang!!!	Released: March 19, 2008; Label: Sony Records; Formats: CD, CD+DVD, digital download, streaming	5	JPN: 45,000
Magic Time	Released: January 1, 2009; Label: Sony Records; Formats: CD, CD+DVD, digital download, streaming	11	JPN: 40,000
Cosmic Inflation	Released: October 6, 2010; Label: Sony Records; Formats: CD, CD+DVD, digital download, streaming	5	JPN: 21,000
9 Lives	Released: April 2, 2014; Label: Sony Records; Formats: CD, CD+DVD, digital download, streaming	14	JPN: 13,000
RGB: True Color	Released: December 4, 2019; Label: Sony Records; Formats: CD, CD+DVD, digital download, streaming	15	JPN: 9,000

==== Cover albums ====
Title	Album details	Peak chart positions	Sales
Title	Album details	JPN	Sales
Shokotan Cover: Anison ni Koi o Shite	Released: May 2, 2007; Label: Sony Records; Formats: CD, CD+DVD, digital download, streaming	17	JPN: 30,000
Shokotan Cover 2: Anison ni Ai o Komete!!	Released: September 19, 2007; Label: Sony Records; Formats: CD, CD+DVD, digital download, streaming	11	JPN: 30,000
Shokotan Cover 3: Anison wa Jinrui o Tsunagu	Released: March 10, 2010; Label: Sony Records; Formats: CD, CD+DVD, digital download, streaming	10	JPN: 28,000
Shokotan Cover 4-1: Shoko Idol-hen	Released: October 12, 2011; Label: Sony Records; Formats: CD, CD+DVD, digital download, streaming	14	JPN: 8,000
Shokotan Cover 4-2: Shoko Rock-hen	Released: October 12, 2011; Label: Sony Records; Formats: CD, CD+DVD, digital download, streaming	10	JPN: 10,000
"Tokyo Shoko Land 2014: RPG-teki Michi no Kioku" Shokotan Cover Bangai-hen	Released: September 24, 2014; Label: Sony Records; Formats: CD, CD+DVD, digital download, streaming	38	JPN: 3,000
Shokotan Self Cover	Self-cover album; Released: March 1, 2023; Label: Sony Records; Formats: CD (Note: Included on the limited edition 3CD-set of Chō! Shokotan Best!!.), digital download, streaming	—	

==== Extended plays ====
Title	Album details	Peak chart positions	Sales
Title	Album details	JPN	Sales
Nsum: Nakagawa Shoko ga Utatte Mita!	Released: August 15, 2012; Label: Sony Records; Formats: CD, CD+DVD, digital download, streaming	12	JPN: 8,000
Uchi-Shigoto, Soto-Shigoto!!	Released: January 9, 2013; Label: Sony Records; Formats: CD+DVD, digital download, streaming	30	JPN: 4,000

==== Compilation albums ====
Title	Album details	Peak chart positions	Sales
Title	Album details	JPN	Sales
Shokotan Best!!	Released: May 2, 2012; Label: Sony Records; Formats: CD, CD+DVD, digital download, streaming	3	JPN: 22,000
Chō! Shokotan Best!!	Released: February 22, 2023; Label: Sony Records; Formats: CD, CD+Blu-ray disc, digital download, streaming	8	JPN: 7,000

=== Singles ===
==== As lead artist ====
2000s

List of singles as lead artist
Title	Year	Peak chart positions		Sales	Certifications	Album
Title	Year	JPN	JPN Hot 100 (Note: The Billboard Japan Hot 100 chart was established in 2008.)	Sales	Certifications	Album
"Brilliant Dream"	2006	29		JPN: 10,000		Big Bang!!!
"Strawberry Melody"	2007	15		JPN: 16,000		Big Bang!!!
"Sorairo Days"	2007	3		JPN: 67,000	RIAJ (dig.): Platinum; RIAJ (ring.): Gold	Big Bang!!!
"Snow Tears"	2008	2	— (Note: "Snow Tears" did not enter the Billboard Japan Hot 100, but peaked at number 4 on the Top Singles Sales chart.)	JPN: 43,000		Big Bang!!!
"Shiny Gate"	2008	8	28	JPN: 20,000		Magic Time
"Tsuzuku Sekai"	2008	5	15	JPN: 50,000		Magic Time
"Kirei à la Mode"	2008	5	30	JPN: 20,000		Magic Time
"Namida no Tane, Egao no Hana"	2009	4	13	JPN: 39,000		Cosmic Inflation
"Kokoro no Antenna"	2009	8	30	JPN: 22,000		Cosmic Inflation
"Arigatō no Egao"	2009	6	28	JPN: 15,000		Cosmic Inflation
"—" denotes a recording that did not chart or was not released in that territory.

2010s

List of singles as lead artist
Title	Year	Peak chart positions		Sales	Album
Title	Year	JPN	JPN Hot 100	Sales	Album
"Ray of Light"	2010	9	48	JPN: 23,000	Cosmic Inflation
"Flying Humanoid"	2010	8	39	JPN: 18,000	Cosmic Inflation
"Sakurairo"	2011	10	52	JPN: 9,000	Shokotan Best!!
"Tsuyogari"	2011	14	58	JPN: 16,000	Shokotan Best!!
"Horoscope"	2012	11	46	JPN: 9,000	Shokotan Best!!
"Canada Kara no Tegami" (with Hideyuki Nakayama)	2013	—	—		Non-album single
"Zoku Konton"	2013	16	47	JPN: 7,000	9 Lives
"Satellite Girl"	2013	—	—		9 Lives
"Sakasama Sekai"	2013	10	40	JPN: 13,000	9 Lives
"Once Upon a Time (Kibō no Uta)"	2013	10	—	JPN: 13,000	9 Lives
"Nuigulumar Z" (with Tokusatsu)	2014	29	— (Note: "Nuigulumar Z" did not enter the Billboard Japan Hot 100, but peaked at number 26 on the Top Singles Sales chart.)	JPN: 3,000	9 Lives
"DoriDori"	2015	8	21	JPN: 21,000	RGB: True Color
"Punch Line!" (with Dempagumi.inc)	2015	13	12	JPN: 23,000	RGB: True Color
"Mugen Blanc Noir" (with Sachiko Kobayashi)	2015	12	39	JPN: 12,000	RGB: True Color
"Izayoi no Tsuki ni Mae"	2016	—	—		Chō! Shokotan Best!!
"Blue Moon"	2018	7	32	JPN: 19,000	RGB: True Color
"Aishiteru"	2019	—	—		RGB: True Color
"Kaze to Issho ni" (with Sachiko Kobayashi)	2019	5	22	JPN: 21,000	RGB: True Color
"—" denotes a recording that did not chart or was not released in that territory.

2020s

List of singles as lead artist
Title	Year	Peak chart positions		Sales	Album
Title	Year	JPN	JPN Hot 100	Sales	Album
"Fure Fure"	2020	14	— (Note: "Fure Fure" did not enter the Billboard Japan Hot 100, but peaked at number 15 on the Top Singles Sales chart.)	JPN: 5,800	RGB: True Color
"Kimi no Manma ga Ii n da yo"	2022	13	— (Note: "Kimi no Manma ga Ii n da yo" did not enter the Billboard Japan Hot 100, but peaked at number 11 on the Top Singles Sales chart.)	JPN: 5,000	Non-album singles
"City Hunter: Ai yo Kienaide"	2023	—	—		Non-album singles
"Nakagawa Shoko"	2023	—	—		Non-album singles
"65535"	2023	7	— (Note: "65535" did not enter the Billboard Japan Hot 100, but peaked at number 11 on the Top Singles Sales chart.)	JPN: 6,200	Non-album singles
"Sorairo Days" (from The First Take)	2023	—	—		Non-album singles
"Nakagawa Shoko" (from The First Take)	2023	—	—		Non-album singles
"Peaky"	2024	—	—		Non-album singles
"Across the World"	2024	3	— (Note: "Across the World" did not enter the Billboard Japan Hot 100, but peaked at number 3 on the Top Singles Sales chart.)	JPN: 12,000	Non-album singles
"Uchū no Nanchara Nakama"	2026	—	—		Non-album singles
"Twilight Magic"	2026	12	— (Note: "Twilight Magic" did not enter the Billboard Japan Hot 100, but peaked at number 9 on the Top Singles Sales chart.)	JPN: 7,400	Non-album singles
"—" denotes a recording that did not chart or was not released in that territory.

==== As featured artist ====
List of singles as lead artist
Title	Year	Peak chart positions		Sales	Album
Title	Year	JPN	JPN Hot 100	Sales	Album
"Pegasus Fantasy" (ver. Omega) (Make-Up feat. Shoko Nakagawa)	2012	29	— (Note: "Pegasus Fantasy" (ver. Omega) did not enter the Billboard Japan Hot 100, but peaked at number 24 on the Top Singles Sales chart.)	JPN: 5,000	Uchi-Shigoto, Soto-Shigoto!!
"Kirakira-go-round" (Angela presents Shoko Nakagawa)	2014	46	— (Note: "Kirakira-go-round" did not enter the Billboard Japan Hot 100, but peaked at number 45 on the Top Singles Sales chart.)	JPN: 2,000	Angela All Time Best 2010–2017
"Magical Circle" (Technoboys Pulcraft Green-Fund feat. Shoko Nakagawa)	2017	—	—		RGB: True Colors
"Mister Darling" (Chico with HoneyWorks meets Shoko Nakagawa)	2018	—	—		RGB: True Colors
"Neet in Jam" (Real Akiba Boyz loves Shoko Nakagawa)	2025	—	—		Non-album single

=== Other appearances ===
List of other appearances, showing year released, other performing artists, and album or single name
Title	Year	Other performer(s)	Album/Single
"Go For It!!" (Note: Character song performed as Suzuna Taki of Eyeshield 21.)	2006		Eyeshield 21 Song Field 6 "Go For It!!"
"Sobakasu" (Note: Judy and Mary cover.)	2009		Judy and Mary 15th Anniversary Tribute Album
"Moeyo Giza Mimi Pichu!"	2009		High Touch 2009/Moeyo Giza Mimi Pichu!
"I'm Here"	2011		The Correct Method of Love Is Not in a Book or Blueprint
"Shiroi Hana" (Note: Zone cover.)	2011		Zone Tribute: Kimi ga Kureta Mono
"Rainbow (Namida no Ato de)"	2012	Ram Rider	Audio Galaxy: Ram Rider vs Stars!!!
"Amayadori"	2012	Deco*27	Love Calender
"Rolling Star" (Note: Yui cover.)	2012		She Loves You
"Samui Yoru da kara..." (Note: TRF cover.)	2013		TRF Tribute Album Best
"Space Battleship Yamato" (Note: Isao Sasaki cover.)	2013	Project Yamato 2199	Space Battleship Yamato
"I'll Be There"	2013		Saint Seiga Omega Song Collection
"Heart Moving" (Note: Misae Takamatsu cover. Ending theme of the 1993 TV anime Pretty Soldier Sailor Moon.)	2014		Pretty Guardian Sailor Moon the 20th Anniversary Memorial Tribute
"Koigokoro" (Note: Nanase Aikawa cover.)	2014		A-Rock Nation: Nanase Aikawa Tribute
"Zoku Punch Line!"	2015	Dempagumi.inc	Otsukare Summer
"Yūki o Dasu no"	2015		Sofia the First Original Soundtrack (Japanese Edition)

== Printed media ==
=== Photobooks ===
Title	Issue date	Publisher	ISBN	Photobook information
Jewel Box	April 1, 2004	Ascom	ISBN 978-4-7762-0147-2	First photobook
In a mysterious daze (不思議に夢中, Fushigi ni Muchū)	July 25, 2005	Wani Magazine	ISBN 978-4-89829-798-8	Second photobook
Shoko et Mikanne (中川翔子x蜷川実花（しょこれみかんぬ）, Shokoremikanu)	April 15, 2007	Wani Books	ISBN 978-4-8470-3000-0	Third photobook
Shoko a la mode (しょこア・ラ・モード—, Shokoa ra mōdō)	November 25, 2008	Shufu-to-Seikatsu-sha	ISBN 978-4-391-13707-1	Guide on how to use cosmetics/dress up doll
Miracle Sketch – Nakagawa Shoko Illust Sakuhinshu (ミラクルスケッチ 中川翔子イラスト作品集, Miracle Sketch – Nakagawa Shoko Illust Sakuhinshu)	January 23, 2010	Yosensha	ISBN 978-4862485137	A collection of illustrations by Shoko Nakagawa
Nakagawa Shoko Monogatari – Sorairo Days (中川翔子物語~空色デイズ~)	July 16, 2010	Kodansha	ISBN 978-4063642742	A manga about the life of Shoko Nakagawa from her childhood. The limited edition contains an extra book with pictures and a pencil box.
Shoko Nakagawa x Mika Ninagawa Photobook "Shoko et Mikanne2 " (中川翔子×蜷川実花写真集 『 しょこれみかんぬ 2 』)	January 28, 2011	Wani Books	ISBN 978-4847043390	Second collaboration with Mika Ninagawa.
Saipan hatsu, Nakano keiyu Mirai iki-Nakagawa Shoko Giza 10- (サイパン発、中野経由、未来行き 中川翔子 ギザ10)	May 30, 2012	Kodansha	ISBN 978-4-06-364889-8	
Shoko-Pedia Nakagawa Shoko Ongakukatsudo Dai Ikki Kiroku Shu (中川翔子音楽活動第一期記録集10)	January 25, 2013	Enterbrain	ISBN 978-4047287440	Contains Interviews from the beginning of her career until 2013 and many pictures.
Nakagawa Shoko Pokemon ga Ikiru Imi o Oshietekureta Shogakkan Visual Mook (ポケモンが生きる意味を教えてくれた)	July 10, 2013	Shogakukan	ISBN 978-4091032287	

=== Blogs ===
Title	Issue date	Publisher	ISBN	Notes
Shokotan Official Blog (しょこたんぶろぐ・中川翔子＊オフィシャル BLOG＊)	October 10, 2005	Goma Books	ISBN 4-7771-0210-6	Entries from November 2004 to August 2005
Shokotan Official Blog 2 (しょこたんぶろぐ・中川翔子＊オフィシャル BLOG 2 ＊)	November 10, 2006	Goma Books	ISBN 4-7771-0487-7	Entries from September 2005 to August 2006
Shokotan Blog Days of Desire (しょこたんぶろぐ貪欲デイズ)	January 25, 2008	Kadokawa Group Publishing	ISBN 978-4-04-895012-1	Entries from October 2006 to December 2007
Shokotan Blog Cho Donyoku Days (しょこたんぶろぐ 超貪欲デイズ)	January 16, 2010	Kadokawa Group Publishing	ISBN 978-4-04-895069-5	Entries from March 2008 to October 2009
