= Bye Bye. (Nanase Aikawa song) =

1996 single by Nanase Aikawa

Single by Nanase Aikawa

from the album Red
- Released: 7 February 1996
- Genre: J-pop
- Label: Motorod
- Songwriter: Tetsurō Oda
- Producer: Tetsurō Oda

Nanase Aikawa singles chronology
"'Yumemiru Shōjō Ja Irarenai'" (1995)	"Bye Bye." (1996)	"'Like a Hard Rain'" (1996)

"Bye Bye." (バイバイ。) is a song by Nanase Aikawa from the debut album Red (1996). The track was composed by Tetsurō Oda and released as a single on 7 February 1996. It peaked at number 19 on the Oricon Singles Chart.

The song was released on the greatest hits compilation I.D. and Rock or Die.

== Track listings ==
1. "Bye Bye. (バイバイ。)"
2. "Jounetsu ni Shisu (情熱に死す)"
3. "Bye Bye. (Original Karaoke) (バイバイ。)"

== Jennifer Ellison version ==
"Bye Bye Boy"

Single by Jennifer Ellison
- Released: 26 July 2004 (UK)
- Genre: Pop
- Songwriters: Jem Godfrey; Bill Padley; Tetsurō Oda

Jennifer Ellison singles chronology
"Baby I Don't Care" (2003)	"Bye Bye Boy" (2004)

Jennifer Ellison covered the title track "Bye Bye Boy" in English and released it as a single in 2004. It is her second, and so far, final single. It reached number 13 on the UK charts.

The music video for "Bye Bye Boy" features Ellison and an all-girl rock band. In the video Ellison dances en pointe, as she was a trained ballet dancer who won multiple championships.
