= Zoids: New Century =

Anime television series created in 2001 by Shogakukan, Inc

- Zoids: New Century DVD Volume 1

ゾイド新世紀 / ゼロ (Zoido Shinseiki Surasshu Zero)
- Genre: Adventure, Comedy, Mecha
- Anime television series
- Directed by: Takao Kato
- Produced by: Hiroshi Morotomi; Toshihiro Nakazawa
- Written by: Katsuyuki Sumisawa
- Music by: Kow Otani
- Studio: Xebec
- Licensed by: Hasbro; Viz Media
- Original network: JNN (MBS, TBS)
- English network: AU: Cartoon Network; CA: YTV; US: Cartoon Network (Toonami)
- Original run: January 6, 2001 – June 30, 2001
- Episodes: 26
- Other series
- List of all Zoids series

Zoids: New Century, or Zoids: New Century Slash Zero (ゾイド新世紀 / ZERO（スラッシュゼロ）, Zoido Shinseiki Surasshu Zero), is an anime television series created in 2001 by Shogakukan, Inc. It is the second Zoids series created, based on the range of mecha models produced by TOMY. The series was originally released in Western nations under the title Zoids, before being later rebranded as Zoids: New Century by Viz Media. It was the first Zoids series to be dubbed in English. In August 2014, a Blu-ray box set of the series was released in Japan. It optionally came with a limited-edition Liger Zero.

== Series background ==
New Century Zero takes place a long time after the events of Zoids: Chaotic Century. Zoids are no longer used for warfare; instead, the combative natures of both Zoids and humans are focused and contained by a series of battle-competitions and tournaments, run by the Zoid Battle Commission.

The Zoid Battle Commission is a significant power on Planet Zi, fielding a considerable arsenal of armed Zoids, orbital platforms serviced by their own launch facilities as well as orbital-based weapons systems. It is not made clear in the series if the Helic Republic and Guylos Empire still exist, although the final battle upon the rusted Ultrasaurus, hinted to be the same one in Zoids: Chaotic Century, could suggest neither were left, and people had free rein to battle in old battlefields.

The series focuses on the Blitz Team, in particular the actions of the Liger Zero and Bit Cloud. The series charts the rise of the Blitz Team through various competitions of the Zoid Battle Commission, and the team's efforts to avoid conflict with the criminal organization known as the Backdraft Group.

== Characters ==
=== The Blitz Team ===
- Bit Cloud

Voiced by: Takahiro Sakurai (Japanese), Richard Ian Cox (English), Peter von Gomm (English)

Formerly a junk dealer, Bit joins the Blitz Team after he is responsible for damaging one of the team's Zoids during a match. Bit discovers that he is the only person capable of piloting the rare Liger Zero owned by the team's manager. Bit makes both friends and rivals with a number of pilots, including Harry Champ, Jack Cisco, Leon Toros, and Vega Obscura. Bit has a close bond with the Liger Zero, treating the Zoid as a friend instead of just a machine. He is often seen in friendly conflict with Leena Toros, arguing over trivial matters like cookies, doughnuts, and the shower schedule.

- Liger Zero (ライガーゼロ, Raigā Zero)

It was initially thought to be useless, not allowing anyone to pilot it. After befriending Bit, it proved to be adept at close combat, using its superheated "Strike Laser Claw" attack to great effect in many battles. It was equipped with the CAS (usually Changing Armor System, also "Conversion" in parts of the dub) to allow switching to one of three incredible, mighty, and most powerful armors: Liger Zero Jager (German: hunter) unit and its ion boosters for speed and agility; Liger Zero Schneider (German: cutter) and its blades for close combat; and Liger Zero Panzer (German: armor/shield), with heavy armor, cannons, and missiles for beating multiple enemies at once. Over the course of the series, it is learned that the Liger Zero is one of a series of unique Ultimate X Zoids, equipped with an integrated Organoid system and possessing the ability to learn and adapt. This allows it to predict and react to enemy attacks far faster than regular Zoids.

- Leena Toros

Voiced by: Ayako Kawasumi (Japanese); Kelly Sheridan (English)

Leena Toros is the daughter of the Blitz Team's manager and is portrayed as a stereotypically loud and bubbly sixteen-year-old girl. She pilots two different Zoids over the course of the series, the De-bison and then the Gunsniper, and is regarded as notoriously trigger-happy in combat, bordering on psychotic. She's also known for her sensitivity and short temper, where she physically assaults others in a comical fashion (usually Bit). Leena is the target of Harry Champ's continual advances. She doesn't reciprocate his feelings and isn't above using them against him. For example, in episode 3, she used him just to get back at Bit for finishing off one of her targets in a previous match, or "stealing her prey", as she put it. In the original Japanese version, the character is named Rinon Toros (リノン・トロス, Rinon Torosu).

- Brad Hunter

Voiced by: Masaya Matsukaze (Japanese); Samuel Vincent (English)

Brad Hunter is a pilot who began his career as a mercenary and was hired by the Blitz Team before the start of the series to boost their pilot number. He pilots a modified Command Wolf but is later forced to steal a prototype Shadow Fox from Dr. Laon and the Backdraft Group. After receiving the Shadow Fox, Brad engages in combat with Bit and the Liger Zero. After a brisk battle, it is stopped due to both pilots belonging to the Blitz Team, and the Shadow Fox officially becomes a member of the Blitz team thanks to Brad's deception—his plan all along. Brad possesses a notably high physical endurance, shown in one instance when Laon stuck him in a G-Force-esque simulator and he retained consciousness despite the deadly force exerted upon him. Because of his mercenary nature, Brad will rarely enter a fight without a promise of financial compensation, even if the other team members are in trouble. In the original Japanese version, the character is named Ballad. Brad's surname is never given in either the Japanese or English versions, but supporting materials give it as "Hunter".

- Jamie Hemeros

Voiced by: Mitsuki Saiga (Japanese); Bill Switzer (English)

Jamie Hemeros serves as Steve Toros' assistant, the Blitz Team's strategist, combat controller, and occasional backup pilot of the team's sole aerial Zoid. He is believed by the characters to be an orphan because of misinformation given by Dr. Toros, but in fact, his father still lives, and at fourteen years of age he is the youngest member of the team. He initially owns a Pteras, but this was traded in by Dr. Toros for a Raynos, the same kind of Zoid piloted by his father. Jamie is caring towards his fellow teammates, who often annoy him by ignoring his advice and battle plans. It is believed that his surname is derived from Hermes, the winged messenger god. His skills as a pilot are marginal; he crashes his Zoid in almost every engagement he participates in. In Atari's English-language ports of the Zoids video games, his name is given as Jimmy.

- The Wild Eagle

The supersonic capabilities of the Raynos allow for the exposure of Jamie's alter-ego, the Wild Eagle. Wild Eagle is portrayed as the polar opposite of Jamie's personality, and can generally be considered a skilled pilot. However, his skill is often counterbalanced by his cocky hubris, which usually results in serious damage to the Raynos, and a period of unconsciousness for Jamie. The Wild Eagle alter-ego appears to be shared by members of the Hemeros family, as Jamie's father, Oscar, exhibited the same abilities and personality changes when flying certain Zoids. Unfortunately, this eventually led to a high-speed, uncontrolled landing of Oscar's Raynos. Oscar was both injured and seriously unnerved by the accident, as Dr. Toros said he "never flew a Raynos again". He was not, despite what the rest of the characters were led to believe, killed. In fact, he often drops by to check up on his son, though he unintentionally seems to make Jamie somewhat miserable (such as good-humouredly patting Jamie on the back when the latter was injured).

- Steve Toros

Voiced by: Daiki Nakamura (Japanese); Ron Halder (English)

Steve Toros is the Blitz Team's manager (but also serves as an inventor and occasionally a combat controller in Jamie's place), whose children are Leena and Leon Toros. He, Dr. Laon, and Oscar are old friends, but when Dr. Toros married the woman (Leena and Leon's mother) loved by Laon, Laon developed a grudge against Dr. Toros and refused to forgive him (his feelings do not extend to Leena, whom he says resembles her mother). Laon incinerated the place where the trio used to gather, completely ending the camaraderie between both of them (Oscar seems to be neutral in the situation). Dr. Toros is 38 years old, he seems to be impulsive (notoriously purchasing weaponry on the basis of being "big" and "shiny"), overdramatic and immature at times, but in all is a knowledgeable man. He built the CAS interchangeable armour system solely for the Liger Zero. He purchased the Liger Zero because white Ligers were rare, but the Zoid was deemed defective because of the scarcity of spare parts for maintenance, as well as its fickle, stubborn personality; it would eject pilots that were forced upon it or deemed unworthy. In many episodes, he is seen playing with model Zoids, of which he's very protective, and frantically panics in comedic fashion whenever he accidentally breaks off a part. He is so fond of them that he's been shown to keep a collection on his bed whenever he sleeps or relaxes.

=== Other characters ===
- Oscar Hemeros

Voiced by Yukimasa Kishino (Japanese), Brian Drummond (English)

A good friend of Dr. Toros having grown up together with the joint ambition of entering the Zoid leagues, he had the misfortune of being the cause of the bitter feud between Dr. Toros and Dr. Laon. Oscar was supposed to write a love letter to a woman whom Dr. Toros and Dr. Laon were courting, but he didn't know that the note was supposed to be from Dr. Laon, not Steve Toros. Oscar was one of the greatest aerial Zoid pilots in his day, earning his moniker "Wild Eagle" for his sheer mastery of aerial stunts and maneuvers. However, one day, he lost control of his Raynos and crashed. The accident forced him into early retirement from the leagues, though he still pilots aerial Zoids in more casual settings. He sent his son, Jamie, to join Dr. Toros' Blitz Team, believing that between him and Toros, they could bring out some of that Wild Eagle blood in Jamie.

- Dr. Laon

Voiced by Michael Dobson (English)

He was formerly friends with the Blitz Team's Steve Toros until an argument between the two involving being the future husband of a woman (Leena and Leon's mother) caused the irreparable rift. He is associated with the Backdraft Group, although he often tries to recruit pilots to challenge the Blitz Team and avenge him (Harry Champ, the Tigers Team, Brad Hunter). It is believed that his reason for joining the Backdraft Group was influenced by alcoholism. Although he hates Toros, he deeply cares for Leena (he claims she resembles her mother), as shown in the instance where he shoved all the other Zoids away with his Whale King to shield her from the massive explosion created by three charged particle cannons. The explosion bore a giant hole on his Whale King and severely injured him, thereafter he told Toros he will never stop seeking his vengeance. At the series finale, Oscar is seen visiting Laon in the hospital.

- Harry Champ

Voiced by Wataru Takagi (Japanese), Brad Swaile (English)

He is "a man destined to be king," as he regularly states numerous times with each appearance. He is heir to half of the Champ's family fortunes, along with his elder sister, Mary Champ; but he couldn't care less about his fortune when it comes to his unrequited love for Leena Toros. He assumes that Leena returns his feelings, which is why in one instance Dr. Laon kidnapped him and used him as a hostage, assuming that Leena wouldn't fire on him but was proven wrong. At the end of the series, Harry planned on proposing to Leena but never got the chance. Harry also has two robots named Benjamin and Sebastian. Because of his wealth, he owns a menagerie of Zoids, claiming to have everything "from a Gojulas to Cannon Tortoises." His main Zoid is a customized Dark Horn, but he has also piloted an Iron Kong and a Cannon Tortoise. Many more Zoids are seen in his hangar, among them a Red Horn, a Shield Liger, and a Gordos.

- Jack Sisco

Voiced by Keiji Fujiwara (Japanese), Brian Drummond (English)

A talented mercenary (having been stated to have never lost prior to his first battle with the Blitz Team) who pilots a cheetah-type Zoid, the Lightning Saix. His personality is depicted as arrogant and aloof. He was initially a free-lance mercenary, but was shown to be very picky with whom he worked for, and only worked for someone with enough money and "luck." Despite being a mercenary, he generally acts as an honorable if not gruff opponent. He later gained two teammates, Kelly and Chris Tasker who also pilot Lightning Saixes, and together, they were able to use a slipstream strategy to defeat the Blitz Team. Bit later defeated him during the Royal Cup.

- Naomi Fluegel

Voiced by Rio Natsuki (Japanese), Saffron Henderson (English)

A female pilot under the alias of the "Red Comet" for being skilled in sniping and long-range combat. She pilots a red Gunsniper with a specialized sniping system that includes a gun within the Zoid's tail. At the beginning of the series, Naomi is a solo pilot, until Leon Toros joins her to form the Flugel Team. Prior to her defeat by the Blitz Team, it was claimed that nobody ever reached within 1,000 yards (910 m) of her Gun Sniper. It's implied she and Brad have a romantic interest in each other.

- Leon Toros

Voiced by Susumu Chiba (Japanese), Ted Cole (English)

As Dr. Toro's elder son, he was formerly on the Blitz Team until Bit joined the group. Having been invigorated by Bit's latent potential as a Zoid pilot and confident that in his absence the team was in able hands with Bit, Leon left the group in hopes of becoming a better pilot. He later becomes Naomi Fluegel's partner. Leon pilots a Shield Liger at the beginning of the series and is later seen piloting a Red Blade Liger. The Zoids he pilots can serve as a parallel to Van Flyheight, Zoids: Chaotic Century's protagonist. He even mentions that he met his Blade Liger while travelling through a legendary valley where the greatest zoid pilots in history had travelled.

- Chris and Kelly Tasker

Voiced by Kelly Sheridan (English)

Twin sisters who join Jack Sisco to form the Lightning Team. Both women pilot Lightning Saixes. The two can be distinguished by their outfits; Kelly wears green while Chris wears blue.

- Kirkland, Omari, and Lineback

Known as the Tigers Team, and mockingly the Fuzzy Pandas Team, these three pilots have a reputation for being losers. Though they start out as capable opponents, they become "comic relief" characters as the series progresses, further supported by Bit's running gag of nicknaming them "The Fuzzy Pandas". In hopes of breaking their unlucky streak (a rather successful move), they rename themselves the Zabre Fangs. They lose in the final battle with the Blitz Team in comedic fashion, where the Judge also referred to them as the Fuzzy Pandas Team, causing their combat systems to freeze and thus allowing the Blitz Team to win by default. They are a reference to the Hanshin Tigers baseball team.

- Mary Champ

Voiced by Lisa Ann Beley (English)

She is Harry's older sister who wants her brother to abandon his obsession with Zoid battles and return home to help their father with their company. After Harry once lost all his Zoids to the Backdraft Group, Mary personally arrived at his estate to demand that he return home, threatening to cut him out of the family fortune if he refused. But when Harry explained his problems to the Blitz Team, particularly Bit, she agreed to meet with them. Upon meeting the Blitz Team, she quickly disapproved of Leena as Harry's love interest but falls in love with Bit's Liger Zero (it was cute). She then challenged the Blitz Team to a battle with the Liger Zero at stake, offering ten times the normal prize money as an incentive. To assist the Champ Team, Mary purchased Iron Kongs. When the Champ Team lost the battle, Mary changed her opinion regarding Zoid battles and decided to leave Harry be.

- Judge Robots

Voiced by Colin Murdock (English)

These robots serve as the umpires in every sanctioned Zoid battle in the series' world. Aside from having artificial intelligence, Judge robots were developed to be more anthropomorphic as the series progressed. Each Judge is dropped onto the battlefield from an orbital Judge Satellite, which also acts as a means of self-defence through orbital strikes. In episode 18, Benjamin falls in love with a Judge (censored in the English dub as a female Judge); in episode 20, the Judge wrestles a Dark Judge while declaring that Brad registered the Shadow Fox as a Blitz Team member; and the final three episodes where the Judge mistakenly calls the Zaber Fangs Team by their Fuzzy Pandas nickname, causing them to lose their balance and crashing their Zoids. The Judge sheepishly declares the Blitz Team victorious by default when he was shouted at by Kirkland.

=== Backdraft Organization ===
Also known as The Backdraft Group, The Backdraft Organization is a group that acts to undermine the Zoid Battle Commission by running unsanctioned battles. Their main goal is capturing Ultimate X Zoids. There are ranks distributed throughout the group; the backdraft is controlled by a "Committee of Seven" and is notorious for its ruthless, underhanded, and often dangerous battle tactics. Known members of the Backdraft include:

- Vega Obscura

Voiced by Motoko Kumai (Japanese), Alex Doduk (English)

An eleven-year-old pilot under the command of the Backdraft Organization (Sarah in particular) who pilots the Berserk Fury (the original uncensored name being Berserk Führer). Because he is basically a child prodigy, his perspective of Zoid battling is mere of a competitive nature: where the next challenge is and the exhilarating high from battling. He and Bit eventually meet in the final rounds of the Royal Cup. He eventually reveals he is as cheerful as Bit and loves the rush of battle.

- Sarah (overseer)

Voiced by Ellen Kennedy (English)

A high-ranking member, and also Vega's handler. Though usually cold and severe, she exhibits a maternal side towards Vega; he is the only thing she really cares about. Even after being shot down by the Zoid Battle Commission, she was only worried about whether Vega was all right.

- Fuma Team

A four-member team, usually employed by Altail. Their team leader is a woman named Fuma and the remaining three pilots are Ehga, Koga, and Negola. They initially pilot War Sharks but are given Genosaurers by Altail to sabotage the Berserk Fury and demote Sarah, which ultimately failed. Fuma is also seen piloting a Hammerhead.

- Pierce

Voiced by Alaina Burnett (English)

She is skilled in aerial combat, defeated only by Jamie (piloting the Raynos in his Wild Eagle persona) and Bit on two separate occasions, and under the direct command of Altail. She leaves the group after her defeat at the hands of Bit, deciding that Backdraft battles are getting old. She has shown to be quite honorable, debating Altail's orders to attack the innocent. She is last seen with Stoller and Sanders. She piloted a Zabat and later a customized Stormsworder.

- Major Polta

Voiced by Scott McNeil (English)

Leader of the Gold Team and a subordinate of Altail, often seen wearing an odd-looking mask.

- Captain Sanders (adjutant of Elephander Pilot)

Voiced by Matt Smith (English)

Stoeller's subordinate, a skilled pilot who looks up to Stoeller and defects from Backdraft along with Stoeller. Last seen celebrating the end of the Zoids tournament with Stoeller and Pierce.

- Captain Stigma Stoeller

Voiced by Scott McNeil (English)

A senior member of the Backdraft, pilot of the Elephander, and highly respected, until he is defeated by Bit Cloud. A man bound by honour, he defects from the Backdraft Group in order to fight a fair battle against Bit. He is last seen with Sanders and Pierce.

- Altail (Chief Executive Officer)

Voiced by Don Brown

The Chief Executive Officer of the Backdraft Group. He believes that Zoids known as Ultimate Xs exist and places his reputation on the line to find them. After recovering the Berserk Fury, he is brushed aside. Henceforth, he attempts to sabotage Sarah to jockey for favor again.

- Count

Voiced by Colin Murdock

Boss of Chief Executive Officer

- Brad Hunter

After stealing the Shadow Fox, he "joined" the Backdraft Group briefly in episode 20 upon Dr. Laon's proposal. He later reneged his deal, saying that he only pretended to betray his team for the Shadow Fox (and a chance to battle Bit one-on-one).

- Dark Judge

Voiced by Samuel Vincent

The Backdraft Group employs their own Judges with their own satellites, colored black as opposed to the Zoid Battle Commission's white. They are greatly biased in favor of the Backdraft Group and will only announce an enemy team's victory begrudgingly.

== Episodes ==
No.	Title	Original release date	English release date
1	"Commence Battle: Attack Liger Zero (Commence Battle: Attack Liger Zero)" (Japanese: 戦闘開始! -ライガーゼロ ゴー･ファイト!-)	January 6, 2001	October 22, 2001
2	"New Partners vs. Naomi: The Red Comet (Two Person's Victory: Crimson Flash Naomi Fluegel)" (Japanese: 二人の勝利 -紅き閃光ナオミ･フリューゲル-)	January 13, 2001	October 23, 2001
3	"The Prince Arrives: Harry Champ (The King Arrives: Harry Champ!)" (Japanese: 王者登場 -ハリー･チャンプ-)	January 20, 2001	October 24, 2001
4	"Unsanctioned Battle: The Mysterious Backdraft (Group Dark Battle: The Mysterious Backdraft Group)" (Japanese: 闇バトル! -謎のバックドラフト団-)	January 27, 2001	October 25, 2001
5	"High Speed Battle: Transforming Into Zero Jager (High Speed Battle: Zero Jager)" (Japanese: 高速対決! -ゼロイエーガー-)	February 3, 2001	October 29, 2001
6	"The Dark Giant: The Invincible Elephander Giant (Figure of the Dark: The Formidable Elephander)" (Japanese: 闇の巨象 -強敵 エレファンダー-)	February 10, 2001	October 30, 2001
7	"The Desert Gang: The Hover Cargo's in Danger (The Violent Wilderness: Hovercargo in Danger)" (Japanese: 激走の荒野 -ホバーカーゴ危機百発!-)	February 17, 2001	October 31, 2001
8	"Invasion of the Fierce Tigers: Transform to Zero Schneider (Fierce Tigers Attack!: Transform! Zero Schneider!)" (Japanese: 猛虎襲来! -換装!!ゼロシュナイダー-)	February 24, 2001	November 1, 2001
9	"The Princess Arrives: Mary Champ (The Empress Arrives: Marry Champ!)" (Japanese: 女帝登場 -マリー･チャンプ-)	March 3, 2001	November 2, 2001
10	"Desert Tusk: Assault of the War Sharks (Desert Tusk: WARDICK Assault)" (Japanese: 砂漠の牙 -ウオディック強襲!!-)	March 10, 2001	November 5, 2001
11	"The Sensational Three: Rematch with Jack Cisco (Three Whirlwinds: Rematch Lightning Saix)" (Japanese: 三つの旋風 -再戦!ライトニングサイクス-)	March 17, 2001	November 6, 2001
12	"Zero Is Stolen: The Fiery Battle (Zero is Stolen!: Fire Death Battle)" (Japanese: ゼロ強奪 -ファイヤーデスバトル-)	March 24, 2001	November 7, 2001
13	"The Brave Wild Eagle: The Raynos vs. the Zabats (The Brave Wild Eagle: The Raynos vs. the Zabats)" (Japanese: 荒鷲の勇者 -レイノス VS ザバット-)	March 31, 2001	November 8, 2001
14	"Frightday the 13th: Ready Ahhh (Rinon Screams: The Saw Demon of the 13th)" (Japanese: リノン絶叫 -敵は13日のノコギリ魔!?-)	April 7, 2001	November 9, 2001
15	"Laon Returns: Anti-Gravity Catastrophe! (Laon Again: Anti-Gravity Catastrophe)" (Japanese: ラオン再び -反重力カタストロフィ-)	April 14, 2001	November 12, 2001
16	"Red Rival: Leon Toros Returns! (The Crimson Rival: Leon Toros Returns)" (Japanese: 赤き好敵手 -レオン･トロス帰還-)	April 21, 2001	November 13, 2001
17	"Warriors On Vacation: The Storm Sworders (Warrior's Vacation: The Two Storm Sworders)" (Japanese: 戦士の休息 -二つのストームソーダー-)	April 28, 2001	November 14, 2001
18	"Love on the Battlefield: My Love, the Judge (Falling in Love on the Battlefield: My Beloved Judgeman-sama!)" (Japanese: 恋する戦場（バトルフィールド） -愛しのジャッジマンさま-)	May 5, 2001	November 15, 2001
19	"The Third Conversion: Zero Panzer's Debut! (The Third Transformation: Zero Panzer Debut!)" (Japanese: 第三の換装 -ゼロパンツァー始動!!-)	May 12, 2001	November 19, 2001
20	"The Shadow Fox: Brad's Betrayal (Fox: Ballad's Betrayal)" (Japanese: フォックス -裏切りのバラッド-)	May 19, 2001	November 20, 2001
21	"Harry's Disaster: Dr. Laon Traps Toros! (The King's Misfortune: Dr. Laon's Great Trap)" (Japanese: 王者の災難 -ラオン博士の華麗なる罠-)	May 26, 2001	November 21, 2001
22	"The Dragon Under the Sea: In Search of the Ultimate X (The Dragon Lurking in the Sea: Search for the Ultimate X!)" (Japanese: 海に潜む竜 -アルティメットXを探せ!-)	June 2, 2001	November 22, 2001
23	"The Dragon Awakens: The Berserk Fury Enters the Fray (Awakening Dragon: Beserk Fuhrur Enters the Battle)" (Japanese: 目覚める竜 -バーサークフューラー参戦-)	June 9, 2001	November 26, 2001
24	"Tournament of Heroes: The Royal Cup (The Tournament of Heroes: Opening! Royal Cup)" (Japanese: 勇者の祭典 -開幕!ロイヤルカップ-)	June 16, 2001	November 27, 2001
25	"Survival: The Mystery of the Ultimate X (Survival: The Mystery of the Ultimate X)" (Japanese: サバイバル -アルティメットXの謎-)	June 23, 2001	November 28, 2001
26	"The Miracle of Zero: The Wind, the Cloud and Adventure (The Miracle of Zero: Wind and Clouds and Adventure...)" (Japanese: ゼロの軌跡 -風と雲と冒険と…-)	June 30, 2001	November 29, 2001

== Theme songs ==
Opening

- "No Future" by Nanase Aikawa

Ending

- "Sasuraibito" by DASEIN
- "No Future (Instrumental)" by Nanase Aikawa (U.S. Ending)
