= The Biography Channel (UK & Ireland) =

British general entertainment channel

Programming
- Timeshift service: Bio +1

Ownership
- Owner: A+E Networks UK (A&E Networks/Sky plc)
- Sister channels: Crime & Investigation Network; History; H2

History
- Launched: 1 October 2000
- Closed: 4 November 2013
- Replaced by: Lifetime

Links
- Website: thebiographychannel.co.uk (Web Archive)

The Biography Channel (also known as Bio.) was a British general entertainment channel available in some European countries. The channel was launched on 1 October 2000 by a joint-venture between A+E Networks and British Sky Broadcasting in the United Kingdom. It later became available in Ireland, the Netherlands and Belgium. The channel's programming, as the name suggests, is made up of the biographies of famous people, including bands, politicians and criminals. The channel ceased broadcasting at 6 am on 4 November 2013 and was replaced by Lifetime.

== Availability ==
In the United Kingdom the channel was available on Sky, Smallworld Cable and Virgin Media. In Ireland it was available on Sky and UPC Ireland. In Belgium it was available on Telenet.

== Bio. HD ==
A high definition version launched on Sky on 5 November 2008, it was also available on Virgin Media Ireland from October 2009. Bio. HD operated on a separate schedule to the standard definition channel and timeshared with CI HD. The channel closed on 3 July 2012 to allow CI HD to broadcast 24 hours a day.

== See also ==
- FYI (American TV channel)
- The Biography Channel (Canada)
- Bio (Australian TV channel)
