= Choriki Robo Galatt =

1984 anime television series

- 超力ロボ ガラット
- Genre: Mecha, parody, science fiction, comedy
- Created by: Hajime Yatate
- Developed by: Hiroyuki Hoshiyama
- Directed by: Takeyuki Kanda; Tetsurō Amino (chief episode director)
- Music by: Masanori Sasaji
- Country of origin: Japan
- Original language: Japanese
- No. of episodes: 25

Production
- Producers: Kei Moriyama (Nagoya TV); Masuo Ueda (Nippon Sunrise)
- Production companies: Nagoya TV; Nippon Sunrise

Original release
- Network: ANN (Nagoya TV, TV Asahi)
- Release: October 5, 1984 – April 5, 1985

Choriki Robo Galatt (超力ロボ ガラット, Chōriki Robo Garatto) is a comedy-science fiction anime series by Nippon Sunrise. It is also known as Super Robot Galatt and Change Robo Galatt.

Produced by Nippon Sunrise, the series aired from October 1984 to April 1985 on Nagoya TV, TV Asahi and its affiliates. It was the follow-up series to Ginga Hyōryū Vifam, using many of the same production staff (including Toyoo Ashida as character designer and Kunio Okawara as mecha designer), and was made to purposely be lighter and less serious than its predecessor. The series was a debut role for both Katsuhiko Nakagawa (as Michael) and Yoshino Takamori (as Patty).

According to Jonathan Clements and Helen McCarthy's The Anime Encyclopedia, the series spoofs the classical mecha genre, with the battles between robots serving as "a topic for gag and parody".

== Plot ==
In the future, war has ceased to exist on Earth and ownership of any weapons has been banned. Dothan, an evil alien and member of the Space Real Estate (a division of the Space Syndicate), has invaded the Earth with the intention of buying up its land by force. The police are helpless in the face of the destructive Armoroboids (giant robots). Then a mysterious robot appears, dashing into the scene. This robot is overwhelmingly strong and kicks the invaders to the curb.

Dr. Kiwi lies to the police that the robot, Galatt, was controlled by righteous aliens and that he was the only one who could contact them and ask for help. In actuality, Galatt was a (forcibly) modified version of Michael Marsh's school-riding robot, Jumbow, and had ordered Michael to hide his true identity by telling him that he would be punished if his possession of the weapon was discovered, while trying to get money from the police by posing as an intermediary with the aliens. So Jumbow, Michael, Patty the girl who drives Patyge (Galatt #2), Kamige (Galatt #3) and the young man Kamil fight against the evil aliens to protect the peace of the Earth and (unknown to them) to make money for Dr. Kiwi.

== Characters ==
Michael Marsh (マイケル・マーシュ, Maikeru Māshu)
Voiced by: Katsuhiko Nakagawa
A hot-blooded boy who is the owner of Jumbow. 13 years old. Dr. Kiwi modifies Jumbow without permission, and cajoled Michael into becoming a Galatt pilot. His father works for a company, and his family is middle class. When he transforms into Galatt, he hides his face with goggles and wears a protective overalls suit. This was the first and only TV anime role of actor and musician Katsuhiko Nakagawa before his death in 1994.
Patty Pumpkin (パティ・パンプキン, Pati Panpukin)
Voiced by: Yoshino Takamori
Michael's girlfriend who is the owner of Patyge. 13 years old. She has an active personality and after witnessing Jumbow Galatt's exploits, she takes out Patyge and asks Dr. Kiwi to remodel it for her to participate in the battles. She grew up free and uninhibited because her parents are both working (running a supermarket) and are laissez-faire. When she transforms into Galatt, she hides her face with a visor and wears a tube top and bottom costume.
Kamil Kashmir Jr. (カミル・カシミールJr., Kamiru Kashimīru Jr.)
Voiced by: Hirotaka Suzuoki
A former multi-millionaire, he lost all his money due to Dr. Kiwi. 17 years old. He is good-looking, but his words and actions are always comedic and he often makes goofy faces. The Kamige he owns was taken from Dr. Kiwi in return for his apology. When he finds out about Galatt's secret, he forces the doctor to transform Kamige into Galatt. When he transforms into Galatt, he hides his face with an eye mask and wears a Zorro-style costume. During the design stages, he was given the name "Bowie."
Kiwi Grekovich (キウイ・グレコビッチ, Kiui Gurekobitchi)
Voiced by: Naoki Tatsuta
A so-called mad scientist. 58 years old. He is an eccentric man who is always on the move. He is always struggling to find funding for his research, and is planning to make a fortune by taking advantage of the alien invasion. He flies around at high speed on a horse-shaped robot called Silver. He is misunderstood by Saladoil as the father of Sakuko Jidaiin. During the design stages, he was named "Dr. Edisong."
Sakuko Jidaiin (時代院 咲子, Jidaiin Sakuko)
Voiced by: Kumiko Takizawa
The pestering assistant of Dr. Kiwi, who appears in the middle of the story, and is in love with Michael's Galatt. She doesn't know who Galatt is. She is a beautiful Yamato nadeshiko-like woman with an old-fashioned (anachronistic) fashion sense and way of thinking. She is extremely nearsighted and cannot tell who is who without her glasses. Saladoil and the rest of the Space Syndicate fall in love with her at first sight, and she later becomes the catalyst for an alliance against the Dreal aliens.
Heave-Ho Sisters (どすこい姉妹, Dosukoi shimai)
Voiced by: Yoshiko Sakakibara
These twin sisters, with their trademark thick lips protruding from their faces and pigtails, are traveling in search of the fantastic "coal candy." They suddenly appear on-screen and say, "Heave-ho!" and are otherwise irrelevant to the episodes' story. They later appeared as supporting characters in Mashin Hero Wataru and Chō Bakumatsu Shonen Seiki Takamaru.
State Governor (州知事, Shūchiji)
Voiced by: Kōsei Tomita
The governor of the state who has been verbally tricked by Dr. Kiwi into paying Galatt's brokerage fee. He often calls Dr. Kiwi to request for "Galatt's dispatch" whenever the Armoroboids attack.
Kid the Pirate (海賊キッド, Kaizoku Kiddo)
Voiced by: Show Hayami
A space pirate. He kidnapped Marian, but that was the beginning of their love affair.
Marian (マリアン)
Voiced by: Yumi Takada
A princess of some planet. She is in love with Kid the Pirate. She was once kidnapped by Kid and later by Dothan.
Dr. Neinstein (ナインシュタイン博士, Nainshutain-hakase)
Voiced by: Shigezō Sasaoka
An old friend of Dr. Kiwi. He is an old man (estimated to be in his early 60s) with a Japanese look that doesn't match his name. According to Dr. Kiwi, he is "a man who seems to have been born to build battle robots," which is why he rebels against the ban on the development and production of battle robots. This is where he is taken advantage of by the Space Syndicate.
Grash (グラッシュ, Gurasshu)
Voiced by: Shigezō Sasaoka
The boss of the Space Syndicate, a huge space mafia that he built in his lifetime. He is a hard-faced and powerful man, but he also loves his subordinates. He was later killed in battle against the Dreal aliens who invaded his home base.
Saladoil Oil (サラダーユ・オイル, Saradāyu Oiru)
Voiced by: Yūji Mitsuya
A childish man in a red suit with a kettle on his shoulder. He has the appearance of a skinny young man in his twenties who is rich and from a good family. Despite his looks, he is the No. 2 of the Space Syndicate. On the other hand, he is as serious and sincere as he looks and has a strong sense of responsibility, which is why his subordinates seem to like him. After the death of Grash, he took over as the second boss of the Syndicate. On Earth, he falls in love with Sakuko Jidaiin at first sight.
Sesalioil Oil (ゴマラーユ・オイル, Gomarāyu Oiru)
Voiced by: Kenichi Ogata
Saladoil's younger brother. Despite his stern face, he loves chocolate parfaits. He died in battle against the Dreal aliens. His name is derived from "sesame oil" and "chili oil."

== Theme songs ==
- Opening: "Welcome! Galatt -Galatt's Theme-" (『Welcome! ガラット - ガラットのテーマ』)
- Ending: "Mysterious Twilight -Patty's Love Song-" (『不思議なトワイライト - パティのLOVE SONG』)
  - Vocalist: Yumi Murata
