= Crimson (Nanase Aikawa album) =

Studio album by Nanase Aikawa
- Released: July 22, 1998
- Genres: Power pop, alternative rock, electronic rock
- Label: Motorod Records

Nanase Aikawa chronology
ParaDOX (1997)	Crimson (1998)	ID (1999)

Crimson is Nanase Aikawa's third album; it reached number 1 on the Oricon Albums Chart and spent 11 weeks in that chart. The album was certified double platinum by RIAJ in July 1998; it reached number 3 on the Dempa Publications albums chart.

== Track listing ==
1. ◯◯◯◯？
2. Nostalgia
3. Sayonara wo Kikasete (さよならを聴かせて)
4. Nemurenai Yoru (眠れない夜)
5. Night Wave
6. Bad Girls
7. fragile
8. Velvet moon
9. Tamannai Shunkan (たまんない瞬間)
10. Kanojo to Watashi no Jijou (彼女と私の事情)
11. Yasashii Uta (優しいうた)
