= Katsuhiko Nakagawa =

- Also known as: Katsuo Nakagawa (中川 勝夫, Nakagawa Katsuo)
- Born: July 20, 1962
- Origin: Tokyo, Japan
- Died: September 17, 1994 (aged 32)
- Genres: Rock
- Occupation: Model / singer / tv personality / presenter
- Years active: 1980–1994
- Labels: Warner Pioneer; NEC Avenue

Katsuhiko Nakagawa (中川 勝彦, Nakagawa Katsuhiko; July 20, 1962 – September 17, 1994) was a Japanese actor and musician from Tokyo. He is the father of the multi-tarento Shoko Nakagawa. He appeared in the 1986 adaptation of Toki o Kakeru Shōjo, voiced the lead character of Superpowered Robo Garat, and released 10 singles and 9 albums before his death in 1994, with two albums released posthumously.

After his debut appearance as a musician in NHK's Young Music Festival, he started to become known after appearing in the movies Narawareta Gakuen (1981) and Tenkōsei (1982). On February 22, 1984, he released simultaneously his debut album and single entitled Shite Mitai through Warner Pioneer. In September 1992 he was diagnosed with acute myeloid leukemia. He passed 9 months fighting against the disease and managed to make a comeback to Japanese entertainment, but his leukemia reappeared in August 1994, leading to his death on September 17, 1994.
