= Paradox (Nanase Aikawa album) =

ParaDOX

Studio album by Nanase Aikawa
- Released: July 2, 1997
- Genres: Power pop, alternative rock
- Label: Motorod Records

Nanase Aikawa chronology
| Red (1996) | ParaDOX (1997) | Crimson (1998) |

Paradox (stylized ParaDOX) is Nanase Aikawa's second album. The album reached number 1 on the weekly Oricon Albums Chart, and sold over a million copies, as certified by the RIAJ.

== Track listing ==
CD
| No. | Title | Lyrics | Music | Arranger(s) | Length |
|---|---|---|---|---|---|
| 1. | "CAT on the Street" | Nanase Aikawa, Tetsurō Oda | Tetsurō Oda | Tetsurō Oda | 4:33 |
| 2. | "Tenshi no You ni Odorasete (天使のように踊らせて)" | Nanase Aikawa | Tetsurō Oda | Tetsurō Oda | 5:11 |
| 3. | "Troublemaker (トラブルメイカー) (trouble mix)" | Tetsurō Oda | Tetsurō Oda | Tetsurō Oda | 4:08 |
| 4. | "Akeru Koto no Nai Yoru Shizumu Koto no Nai Taiyou (明けることのない夜 沈むことのない太陽, Night never dawn, sun never sinks)" | Tetsurō Oda | Hiroshi Uemura | Hiroshi Uemura, Tetsurō Oda | 5:38 |
| 5. | "Tori ni Naretara (鳥になれたら, If I can become a bird)" | Nanase Aikawa | Tetsurō Oda | Tetsurō Oda | 4:18 |
| 6. | "a piece of memory" | | Tetsurō Oda | Tetsurō Oda | 1:16 |
| 7. | "Koigokoro (恋心, Love feeling)" | Tetsurō Oda | Tetsurō Oda | Tetsurō Oda | 4:02 |
| 8. | "Konna ni Aishitemo (こんなに愛しても, Even though I love you so much) (water version)" | Nanase Aikawa | Tetsurō Oda | Tetsurō Oda | 5:35 |
| 9. | "Love merry-go-round" | Nanase Aikawa, Shin Hongo | Shin Hongo | Akira Horie, Tetsurō Oda | 5:03 |
| 10. | "Sweet Emotion (S.V.mix)" | Nanase Aikawa, Tetsurō Oda | Tetsurō Oda | Tetsurō Oda | 5:11 |
| 11. | "Two of us" | Nanase Aikawa | Tetsurō Oda | Tetsurō Oda | 4:46 |
