= Dance Mums with Jennifer Ellison =

- Genre: Reality
- Starring: Jennifer Ellison
- Country of origin: United Kingdom
- Original language: English
- No. of series: 2
- No. of episodes: 17 (including 1 special)

Production
- Running time: 46 minutes
- Production company: Shiver Productions

Original release
- Network: Lifetime
- Release: 20 October 2014 – 30 November 2015

Related
- Dance Moms; Dance Moms: Miami

Dance Mums with Jennifer Ellison is a British reality television series that made its debut on Lifetime on 20 October 2014. Created by Shiver Productions, it is set in Liverpool, England, at Jelli Studios and follows the early careers of children in dance and show business, as well as the participation of their mothers. It is a spin-off of the American TV series Dance Moms.

The second series began airing on 12 October 2015, but the show was not commissioned for a third series.

== Premise ==
The series follows Jennifer Ellison, the owner of The Jennifer Ellison Fame Academy in Liverpool, England, as she coaches 7 girls towards the goal of competing in the Dance World Cup in Portugal.

== Cast ==
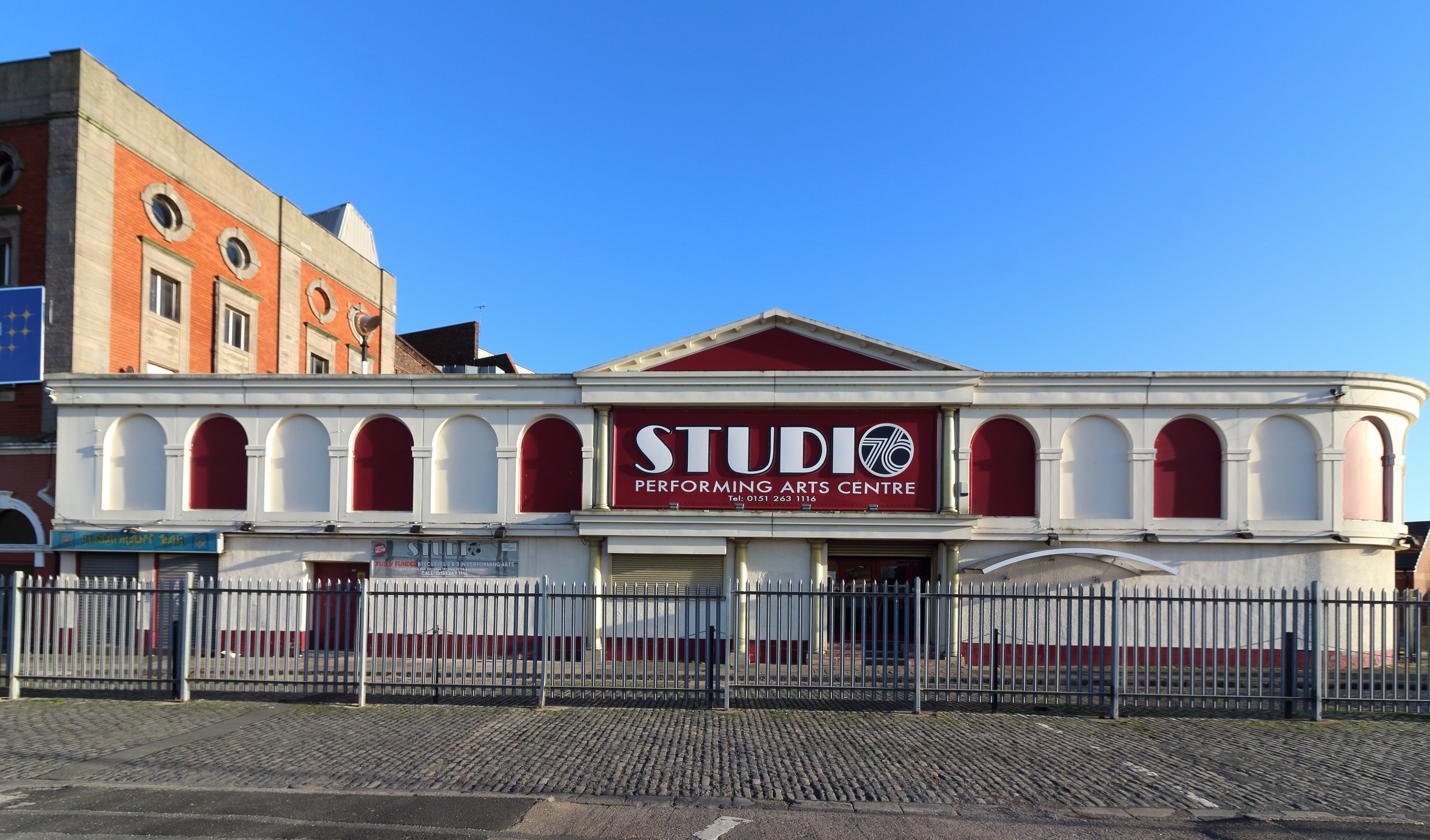
Studio 76, location for series 1

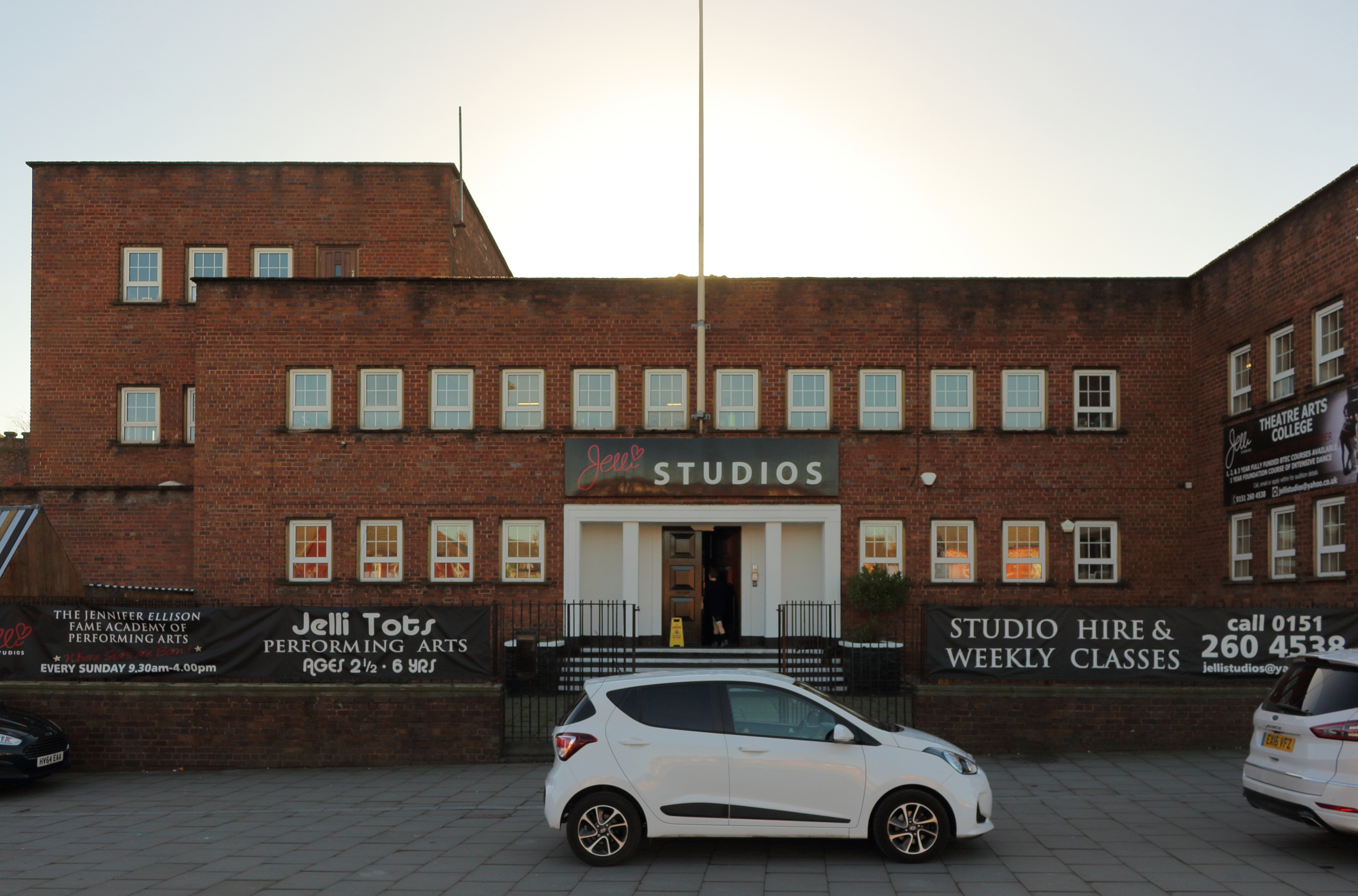
Location for series 2

- Jennifer Ellison: Owner of The Jennifer Ellison Fame Academy.

=== The Mums ===
- Charlotte Traynor: Sam's mother
- Danielle Simpson: Aleah’s mother.
- Maxine Kelly: Tayluer's mother.
- Kathryn Creech: Harrison's mother.
- Kelly Navis: Eleiyah's mother.
- Serena McConville: Chloe's mother.
- Lisa Kennedy: Leah Rose's mother.
- Claire Smallman: Harry's mother.

=== Former Mums ===
- Helen Thorpe-Franklin: Molly's Mother.
- Carol Greenwood: Chloe Senior's Mother.
- Nana Linda: Chloe Senior's Grandmother.

=== Dancers ===
- Sam Dennis: A contemporary/commercial dancer who isn't afraid to speak her mind in the dog-eat-dog world of dance.
- Aleah Simpson: A musical theatre/contemporary dancer that is despite her mother's passion considered the underdog of the group.
- Tayluer Amos: A contemporary/lyrical dancer who is considered Jennifer's star student. Fans also call her the "UK Maddie" because of her high achievements in the world of competitive dance.
- Harrison Creech: A commercial/jazz funk dancer who was considered a threat to the other kids due to his high UK and International achievements in dance.
- Eleiyah Navis: A lyrical/contemporary/musical theatre/tap dancer who is Tayluer's rival, which results in them being compared a lot.
- Chloe Fenton: A jazz/hip hop/contemporary dancer. Due to her young age and impressive dance skills, she is considered a prodigy amongst Jennifer.
- Molly Thorpe-Franklin: A musical theatre/jazz/contemporary dancer, 'Miss Independent' Molly takes a serious approach to dancing. She is cut from the team in the last episode of season 1 along with Chloe G. due to her low success during the competition season.
- Chloe Greenwood: A lyrical/ballet dancer who has been dancing her whole life, Chloe has recently been showing signs of uninterest in dance. She is cut from the team in the last episode of season 1 along with Molly because of her uninterest in dance. She later gets called back in the season 2 episode "I Wasn't Prepared for This" and she competes with the team for the episode before leaving again.

=== Guest Dancers ===
- Josh Adedoyin:
- Angel Wharmby:

=== Cast Duration ===
Dancer/Dance Mom	Appearances by episode															
Dancer/Dance Mom	Series 1								Series 2							
Dancer/Dance Mom	1	2	3	4	5	6	7	8	1	2	3	4	5	6	7	8
Tayleur (Mum: Maxine)																
Eleiyah (Mum: Kelly)																
Chloe Jnr (Mum: Serena)																
Sam (Mum: Charlotte)																
Aleah (Mum: Danielle)																
Molly (Mum: Helen)																
Chloe Snr (Mum: Carol)																
Harry (Mum: Claire)																
Leah Rose (Mum: Lisa)																
Sophia (Mum: Paula)																

Notes
Key: = featured in this episode
Key: = not featured in this episode
Key: = dismissed by Jennifer Ellison
Key: = joins the Jennifer Ellison Dance Team
Key: = returns to the Jennifer Ellison Dance Team
Key: = joins the Reserve Team
Key: = leaves the Jennifer Ellison Dance Team
Key: = leaves the Jennifer Ellison Dance Team and the show entirely

== Series overview ==
Series	Episodes	Originally released	
Series	Episodes	First released	Last released
1	9	20 October 2014	8 December 2014
2	8	12 October 2015	30 November 2015

=== Series 1 (2014) ===
No. in series	Title	Original release date
0	"Dance Mums: Abby Meets Jennifer"	13 October 2014
Prepare yourself for fireworks! In the lead up to our brand new series, Dance Mums with Jennifer Ellison, Abby Lee Miller the star of hit US series Dance Moms, travels to the UK to teach Jennifer Ellison some tricks of the competitive dance world and show her how it’s done, stateside. There are tears of joy when Abby walks in to surprise the UK mums and girls. They love Abby, but will they love her by the end of the day? Abby immediately gets to work – putting the girls through their paces, testing them, finding their strengths and their weaknesses and seeing if they’re up to Abby Lee’s exacting standard. Jennifer is pleased with her surprise, but wants to make sure the girls perform to the best of their abilities so they can prove to Abby that the Brits have got just as much talent as their American counterparts. But when they don’t step up to the mark there’s hell to pay! Some seriously stern words from Jennifer and the girls are ready to perform a special routine for Abby. As the day draws to a close Abby selects her favourites from Jennifer Ellison’s Dance Team – but who will be top of her dance pyramid?
1	"It All Starts Here!"	20 October 2014
It's week one of the eight-week competition season for Jennifer Ellison’s brand new dance team. She’s personally selected these girls and their mums from her home town of Liverpool and they’d better deliver, it’s Jen’s name and reputation on the line!
2	"It's All Kicking Off"	27 October 2014
It’s all kicking off this week as the mums lose their cool causing Jen to impose some new rules. With everything spinning out of control it’s not looking good for this week’s competition on home turf. How will the girls fare against their local rival dance-schools.
3	"One Man Down: Crisis Auditions"	3 November 2014
Following last week’s shock outburst, Chloe Snr and her mum are excluded and auditions are held to find a replacement. After missing a rehearsal Sam is pulled from her duet and with last week’s terrible results still fresh in their minds, the girls must step up to the mark.
4	"The Wheels Fall Off"	10 November 2014
After last week’s success in Glasgow things were looking up, but not for long. Chloe Snr is back with her Nana Linda but with meltdowns, forgotten routines, broken rules and a trip to casualty for one of the girls, she returns to a studio on the edge.
5	"Welcome To The Madhouse"	17 November 2014
Jen declares this week as ‘Street Dance’ week even though the competition is a very straight-laced and posh affair. How will the controversial routine go down with the upper classes? And to top it off, Jen announces a new addition to the team.
6	"Bring In The Boys"	24 November 2014
Jen decides to mix things up by bringing in two boys, Jack and Adam but their mums are not welcomed with open arms. It’s solo challenge week and everyone will be dancing the same routine, but only one can dance at the competition – and it’s up to the mums to decide who.
7	"Everyone's Time To Shine"	1 December 2014
There’s only one week to go before the team travel to Portugal for the Dance World Cup. Focusing on each of the girls’ individual skills everyone is given a solo and the chance to shine, an opportunity that allows Aleah to prove herself.
8	"It's the Dance World Cup (It's Kelly's Glory Day!)"	8 December 2014
This is it, it’s the Dance World Cup and for the girls and their mums it doesn’t get any bigger than this. Chloe Snr’s commitment is questioned when she’s late for rehearsal and the pressure is on for a nervous Chloe Jnr as she prepares for her solo performance. With 18,000 performers, will the girls bring home the medals?

=== Series 2 (2015) ===
No. in series	Title	Original release date
1	"No-one's Safe"	12 October 2015
Week 1 sees a new team member, an understudy, shed loads of arguments and performances to remember at the competition - but will the first episode in this series end with winning performances!?
2	"Our Team is Falling Apart"	19 October 2015
The team steps it up after last week's defeat with a Bollywood routine. Later, Jen brings in a whole new reserve team, forcing the girls to fight for a place on the squad.
3	"Bring It On"	26 October 2015
When a brand new lead dancer and her mother are introduced to the team, Jennifer's squad members find themselves having to bite their tongues.
4	"Never Again Are We Doing Six Solos And A Group"	2 November 2015
Dancer Harry has to leave the group due to school commitments, so Jennifer brings in brand new firecracker Leah Rose and her mother Lisa to take his place.
5	"You All Need To Realise The Opportunities I Can Give You"	9 November 2015
Jen picks a routine from the Phantom of the Opera as the girls compete in a musical-themed competition, while one dancer gets to star in a Nadia Forde music video.
6	"It's Dog Eat Dog In The World Of Competitive Dance"	16 November 2015
Serena has the idea of a team-building dance session with all the mums, but tempers boil over.
7	"I Wasn't Prepared For This"	23 November 2015
Danielle holds a party to unveil Little Aleah's dancewear range and later, at the competition, the girls perform a Chicago routine.
8	"It's The End Of An Era, Kid"	30 November 2015
Bring on an epic end to series 2! A former team member returns with a secret weapon that surprises everyone, Charlotte and Sam make a difficult, and very sad decision, and who will win the Capezio prize?
