= Jennifer Ellison =

English actress, model and singer

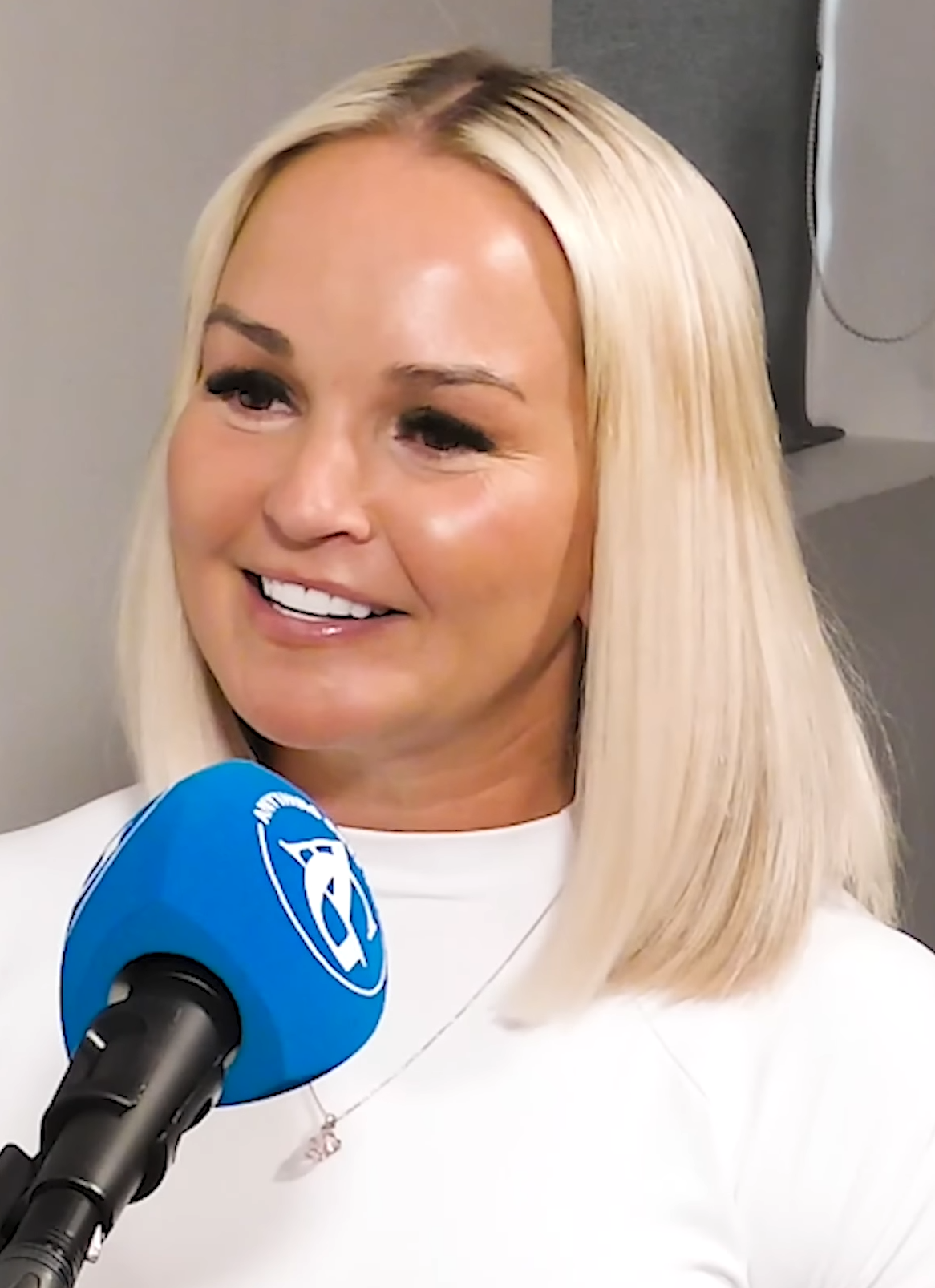
- Ellison in 2024
- Born: Jennifer Lesley Ellison; 30 May 1983 (age 43); Liverpool, England
- Occupations: Actress; singer; model; reality TV personality
- Height: 5 ft 7 in (170 cm)
- Spouse: Robbie Tickle (m. 2009)

Jennifer Lesley Ellison is an English actress, television personality and singer. Ellison is perhaps best known for playing Emily Shadwick in the television soap opera Brookside until 2003, and as Meg Giry in the 2004 film adaptation of The Phantom of the Opera. Ellison also starred on the reality television show Dance Mums with Jennifer Ellison, the UK version of the American show Dance Moms.

== Career ==
=== Dance ===
Ellison studied dance from the age of three, first at a dance school in Liverpool, then later at the Elizabeth Hill School of Dance in St Helens. She has achieved examination passes with the Royal Academy of Dance and appeared on instructional videos for the academy. She has also taken examinations with the International Dance Teachers Association (IDTA) and won Ballet and Modern Dance titles at the IDTA Theatre Dance Championships in 1996 and 1997, and in addition was awarded the Carl Alan Award for ballet in 1998. Choosing to pursue a professional career in dance, she successfully auditioned for the Royal Ballet Lower School. She left dance to pursue acting.

In 2012, Ellison was a contestant on Dancing on Ice and made it to the semi-final stages. She hosted the UK version of Dance Moms on Lifetime, Dance Mums with Jennifer Ellison in 2014–15.

=== Television ===
From 1998 to 2002, Ellison played Emily Shadwick in the soap opera Brookside. Her character was 'killed off' when she fell from a window during a robbery. In 2003, Ellison appeared in the travel documentary Jennifer Ellison does Thailand and in 2004, she appeared on the reality television show Hell's Kitchen, which she then went on to win. In 2005, she appeared on the celebrity challenge show With a Little Help From My Friends.

In spring 2007, Ellison appeared in the BBC reality TV show The Verdict, based on a fictional courtroom, alongside the likes of Jeffrey Archer and Sara Payne. That same year, she appeared as a judge on Dirty Dancing – Time of your Life, a United States–based reality television show for the Living TV network. By December of that year, Ellison began appearing as a guest panellist on the ITV daytime show Loose Women.

Additionally, Ellison has also acted in episodes of the British television series The Brief, Hotel Babylon, New Street Law and The Commander. In September 2008, she appeared in a 2-hour long show, called Ghosthunting with Paul O'Grady & Friends, filmed in Sicily, with fellow Liverpudlians Paul O'Grady, Philip Olivier and Natasha Hamilton.

=== Music ===
Ellison released two pop rock singles before giving this venture up for acting and glamour modelling. Her first single was "Baby I Don't Care", released in June 2003, which reached No. 6 in the UK Singles Chart. The song was originally released by Transvision Vamp in 1989. The following year in July, after being brought back into the public eye after winning Hell's Kitchen, Ellison released her second single, "Bye Bye Boy" – originally recorded by the Japanese singer Nanase Aikawa – which reached No. 13 in the UK chart.

==== Single discography ====
| Year | Song | UK Singles Chart | Irish Singles Chart |
|---|---|---|---|
| 2003 | "Baby I Don't Care" | 6 | 8 |
| 2004 | "Bye Bye Boy" | 13 | 8 |

=== Theatre ===
In 2004, Ellison had a run in the London West End theatre version of the musical Chicago at the Adelphi Theatre playing the leading role of Roxie Hart and reprised the role from 10 July to 9 August 2006, this time at the Cambridge Theatre.

In December 2007, she played "Angel" in Liverpool Nativity, a contemporary retelling of the Christmas story for BBC Three which was performed live from the streets of the city.

Ellison featured in the Liverpool Empire Theatre's pantomime version of Cinderella for 2008, opposite Cilla Black and Les Dennis.

She also played Beth in Jeff Wayne's Musical Version of The War of the Worlds at major arenas of the UK in June 2009.

Ellison appeared in the July – October 2010 UK tour of the stage adaption of the film Calendar Girls. The same year she appeared at the Regent Theatre, Stoke-on-Trent, in its pantomime Robinson Crusoe. As well as these, she was on the UK tour company of Legally Blonde The Musical, playing the role of 'Paulette'.

In 2012, Ellison appeared in Peter Pan at the Churchill Theatre Bromley alongside Gemma Hunt, Ace Bhatti and Andrew Agnew. From 18 February 2013, she joined Singin’ in the Rain at the Palace Theatre, London. Ellison joined the cast to play silent movie screen siren and owner of a voice never meant for the ‘talkies’, Lina Lamont.

Ellison was cast in the pantomime of Snow White and the Seven Dwarfs, at the Theatre Royal, Norwich throughout December 2015 to January 2016.

=== Film ===
Ellison made her film debut as Meg Giry in the 2004 film version of the stage musical The Phantom of the Opera. She also starred in the English horror film The Cottage, which was released in the UK on 14 March 2008.

=== Modelling and magazine appearances ===
Ellison was featured in Maxim magazine's "Girls of Maxim"gallery. Ellison took over, from Jordan, a contract with lingerie giant Ultimo for its "Young Attitude" line. Though Ultimo boss Michelle Mone had chosen Jordan for being "sexy, fun and outgoing," she later changed her mind, stating, "Jordan was just the wrong choice for [us]. Jennifer is a far better option and far classier."

Ellison was listed in FHM's 100 Sexiest Women in 2003 (60th), 2004 (29th), 2006 (31st), and 2007 (87th).

=== Other ventures ===
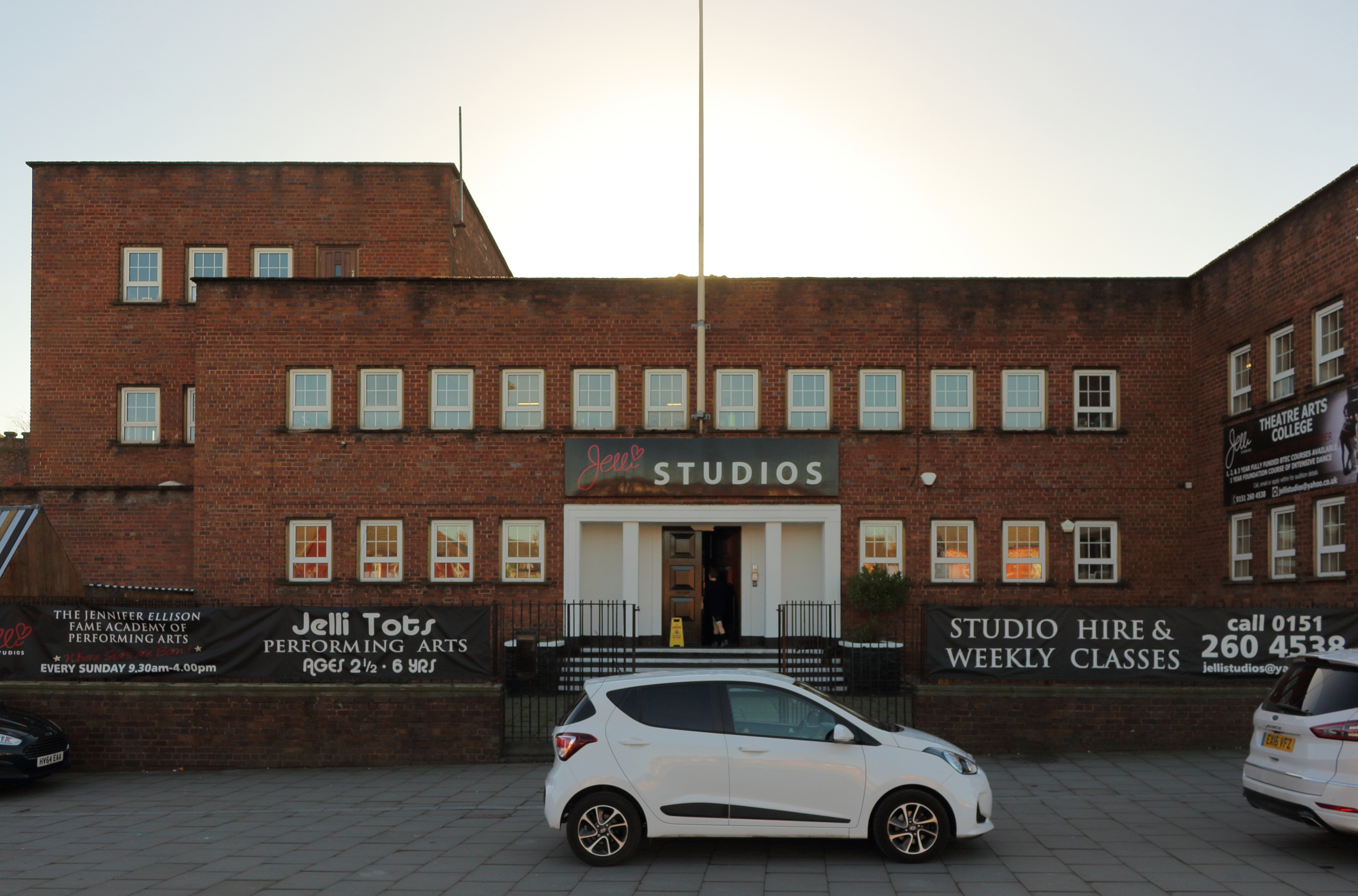
Ellison's studios in Edge Lane, Wavertree

In December 2011, she released a fitness DVD Jennifer Ellison's Fat Blaster Workout.

She took part in the 2012 TV series Dancing on Ice. Ellison and professional partner Daniel Whiston ended up in fourth place after being voted out in the semi-final.

== Personal life ==
Ellison attended St Edward's College for Sixth Form. She is close to her mother and stepfather David.

Ellison and boxer Robbie Tickle began dating in May 2008, and were engaged in October of that year while on holiday in the Maldives. The following year they were married, with the ceremony being performed in Mauritius on 10 October 2009.

On 4 February 2010 she gave birth to her first son.

In May 2018, Ellison was paid an undisclosed sum by Mirror Group Newspapers as settlement for phone hacking.

Ellison is a supporter of Everton FC.
