= Lifetime (British and Irish TV channel) =

- Wear it like Lifetime
- Country: United Kingdom
- Broadcast area: United Kingdom; Ireland

Programming
- Picture format: 1080i HDTV (downscaled to 16:9 576i for the SDTV feed)

Ownership
- Owner: A&E Networks UK (A&E Networks/Sky Group)
- Sister channels: Blaze; Crime+Investigation; Sky History; Sky History 2

History
- Launched: 4 November 2013; 12 years ago
- Replaced: Bio
- Closed: 1 March 2021; 5 years ago

Links
- Website: www.lifetimetv.co.uk

Availability (at time of closure)

Streaming media
- Sky Go: Watch live (UK and Ireland only)
- Virgin TV Go: Watch live (UK only); Watch live (Ireland only)
- TalkTalk TV: Watch live (UK only)
- BT TV: Watch live (UK only)

Lifetime was a British entertainment television channel that launched on 4 November 2013, that was owned by A&E Networks UK, a joint venture between A&E Networks and Sky Group. The channel replaced Bio.

On 6 November 2018, the European Commission required The Walt Disney Company to sell A&E's European channels, including Lifetime.

Programmes aired in the past on the channel included American Lifetime originals such as The Client List, Damages, Witches of East End, and an original series called The Proposers.

It launched on TalkTalk on 28 August 2014 along with its sister channels.

The network was unsuccessful in establishing itself in the market, as Lifetime's American original programming generally already aired on other networks, and remained so even after the launch of the domestic Lifetime; it was forced to carry out-of-format programming from American sister network A&E and History to maintain a full schedule, and it had limited original programming output, including Dance Mums, a local spin-off of Dance Moms that only lasted two series. The network's last prime programming, daily runs and premieres of the American series Judge Judy, left its schedule in 2019, and within months, it began to decline as a going concern.

On 24 January 2019, the HD version closed on Sky. On 7 March 2019, the +1 version closed on all platforms. The network shut down in its entirety at 12:00am and removed at 6:00 on 1 March 2021.

== Closure ==
A+E Networks announced on 11 February 2021 that Lifetime would be closing on all platforms at the end of the month. A+E made an agreement with Discovery, Inc. that the channels original content would move to Discovery+. The last programme that aired was an episode of Sex Lies and Murder. The channel then aired two Crime and Investigation trailers and a trailer for Bringing Up Bates. It then closed at 12:00 am and removed at 6:00 am on 1 March 2021.

== Former programming ==
- Australia's Next Top Model
- Bring It!
- Bonnie & Clyde
- Britain's Next Top Model
- Cajun Pawn Stars
- The Client List
- Damages
- Dance Moms
- Dance Mums with Jennifer Ellison
- Duck Dynasty
- Flipping Vegas
- Frisky Business
- Girlfriends' Guide to Divorce
- Hardcore Pawn
- The Haunting Of...
- I Can Make You a Supermodel
- Judge Judy
- Little Women: Atlanta
- Little Women: LA
- Little Women: NY
- The Mother/Daughter Experiment
- Pawn Stars
- Pitch Slapped
- Project Runway
- Project Runway: Fashion Startup
- The Proposers
- The Rap Game
- The Real Housewives
- Shahs of Sunset
- Storage Wars
- Vanderpump Rules
- Wahlburgers
- Witches of East End

== See also ==
- Lifetime
- Lifetime (Canada)
- Lifetime Real Women
- LMN
