= Koigokoro =

- 8cm single cover

Single by Nanase Aikawa

from the album Paradox
- B-side: "Tenshi no Yō ni Odorasete"
- Released: October 7, 1996
- Genre: J-pop
- Length: 4:00
- Label: Motorod
- Songwriter: Tetsurō Oda
- Producer: Tetsurō Oda

Nanase Aikawa singles chronology
"Break Out!" (1996)	"Koigokoro" (1996)	"Trouble Maker" (1997)

"Koigokoro" (恋心; "My Love") is a song by Japanese recording artist Nanase Aikawa from her second studio album Paradox (1997). The track was composed by Tetsurō Oda and released as a single on October 7, 1996. It peaked at number 2 on the Oricon Singles Chart and was certified million by the Recording Industry Association of Japan (RIAJ).

== Track listing ==
All music is composed by Tetsurō Oda.

8cm single
No.	Title	Lyrics	Length
1.	"Koigokoro"	Tetsurō Oda	4:00
2.	"Tenshi no Yō ni Odorasete" (天使のように踊らせて "Dance Like an Angel")	Nanase Aikawa	5:11
3.	"Koigokoro (Original Karaoke)"	T. Oda	4:01
Total length:			13:12

== Charts and certifications ==
Charts (1996)	Peak position
Oricon Singles Chart	2

=== Sales and certifications ===
Chart	Amount
Oricon physical sales	1,129,000
RIAJ physical shipments	Million
