= Red (Nanase Aikawa album) =

Studio album by Nanase Aikawa
- Released: 3 July 1996
- Genres: Power pop, alternative rock
- Labels: Motorod, Toshiba EMI
- Producers: Masato "Max" Matsuura (exec.), Tetsurō Oda

Nanase Aikawa chronology
Red (1996)	ParaDOX (1997)

Red is Nanase Aikawa's first album, released on 3 July 1996 by Motorod and distributed by Toshiba EMI. It includes her first four singles. The album reached number 1 on the Oricon Albums Chart and spent 55 weeks in that chart. It reached number 1 on the Dempa Publications albums chart. RIAJ certified that it sold over two million copies. RIAJ certified the album triple platinum (1.2 million shipments) in July 1996, quadruple platinum (1.6 million) in August 1996, and 2 million in September 1996. It sold more than 2.7 million copies. It won an album award at the 11th Japan Gold Disc Awards.

== Track listing ==
CD
No.	Title	Lyrics	Music	Arranger(s)	Length
1.	"Hikari to Kage no Labyrinth (光と影の迷宮, Labyrinth of light and shadow)"	Sakuya, Tetsurō Oda	Tetsurō Oda	Tetsurō Oda	5:52
2.	"Yume Miru Shoujo ja Irarenai (夢見る少女じゃいられない, I can't stay a dreamer)"	Tetsurō Oda	Tetsurō Oda	Tetsurō Oda	4:18
3.	"Like a Hard Rain"	Nanase Aikawa, Tetsurō Oda	Tetsurō Oda	Tetsurō Oda	3:57
4.	"Shake Me Baby"	Nanase Aikawa	Tetsuya Mori, Tetsurō Oda	Makoto Akiba, Tetsuya Mori, Tetsurō Oda	4:15
5.	"Sayonara"	Nanase Aikawa	Tetsurō Oda	Tetsurō Oda	4:57
6.	"Break Out!"	Tetsurō Oda	Tetsurō Oda	Tetsurō Oda	4:13
7.	"Glory Days"	Nanase Aikawa, Koji Ide (rap)	Tetsurō Oda	Tetsurō Oda	3:28
8.	"Love Me"	Nanase Aikawa	Akira Horie	Akira Horie	4:10
9.	"Bye-bye. (バイバイ。)"	Tetsurō Oda	Tetsurō Oda	Tetsurō Oda	4:37
10.	"Saigo no Yoru (最後の夜, The last night)"	Nanase Aikawa	Tetsurō Oda	Tetsurō Oda	4:42
11.	"Imademo... (今でも…, Still ....)"	Nanase Aikawa	Tetsurō Oda	Tetsurō Oda	5:35
