= Nanase Aikawa =

Japanese singer (born 1975)

Nanase Aikawa 相川七瀬
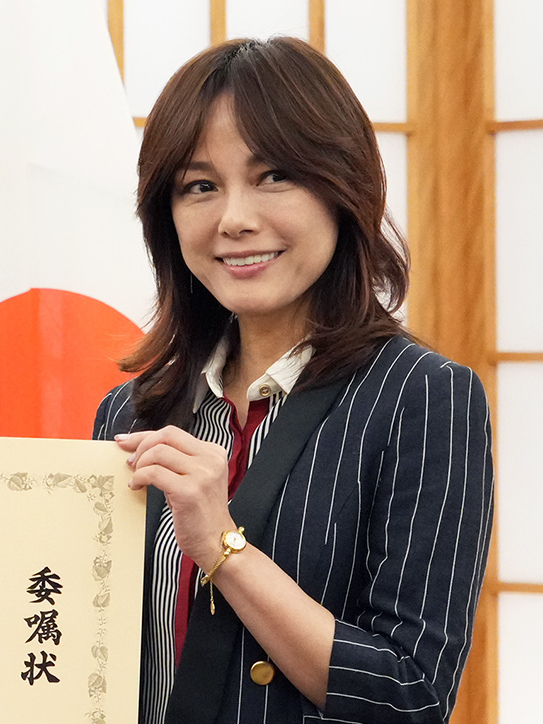

Background information
- Born: 佐伯美咲 (Saeki Misaki); February 16, 1975 (age 51); Higashiyodogawa-ku, Osaka, Japan
- Genres: Rock, J-pop
- Occupation: Singer
- Years active: 1995–present
- Label: Motorod
- Website: nanase.jp

Nanase Aikawa (相川 七瀬, Aikawa Nanase; born February 16, 1975) is a Japanese singer. She publishes her music under the Motorod label, a division of Avex Group.

== Biography ==
=== Early life ===
She was born in Higashiyodogawa-ku, Osaka, Japan on February 16, 1975. Throughout her school years, Nanase had sung and participated in several singing competitions. When Aikawa auditioned for Sony Music Entertainment at the age of 15, she failed, but met a well-known music producer Tetsuro Oda.

At the age of 17, she dropped out of school, and she contacted Oda to be trained by him. At the age of 20 she released her first single, Yume Miru Shoujo ja Irarenai on November 8, 1995.

=== Career ===
After she released her first single on November 8, 1995, she released three more singles, and then her first full album Red in 1996, which sold more than two million copies in its first month. That album won her an invitation to perform on Kōhaku Uta Gassen, a New Year's Eve singing contest between male and female teams of popular singers sponsored by NHK (one of Japan's television networks).

Since then, she has released about one album each year, plus an average of three mini- or maxi-singles. Her second album, Paradox, was released in July 1997, selling 1.8 million copies, coinciding with her first concert tour Live Emotion '97 (consisting of 20 concert dates, and attracting a total of 65,000 fans, according to Avex).

July 1998 saw her third album Crimson, and another concert tour with over 40 concert dates. Her 1999 release, I.D. was a compilation album, but it debuted at number one on the rock chart, her fourth consecutive album to be released at the number one slot.

Some music-journalists said that a large part of her fan base, during the 1990s, was the Bōsōzoku (motorcycle gang) youthes especially those in the western areas of Japan.

In 2001, she also released a 'mini-album' (sometime between a full album and a single) with only 7 tracks called the Last Quarter of uncharacteristically soft ballad-style music, recorded during her later months of pregnancy.

It was not until 2003 that she released another album, another compilation, called ID: 2.

"China Rose" (1999)
30-second sample of Nanase Aikawa's song "China Rose" from her album,"Foxtrot".

At the 11th Annual Japan Gold Disc Awards, Nanase's album Red was voted the Best Album (Japanese Rock and Folk music, female vocalist category). Her album Paradox was also voted Best Album of the Year at the 12th Annual Japan Gold Disc Awards.

In February 2004, three years after her last original album and many singles, she released 7 Seven. An album devoted to feelings relating to music and color, with each song dedicated to a certain color. Since then she has released four more singles.

In 2004, her song BYE BYE was covered by the English singer Jennifer Ellison as "Bye Bye Boy", and Swedish girl group Play as "Girls Can Too".

As of August 2004, Nanase Aikawa has released six albums, plus two compilation albums and the mini-album, a total of 24 singles, and no less than three separate concerts and two music video collections on video and DVD.

A year later, in February 2005, she released The First Quarter mini-album. This album focused more on ballads and soft music than her well-known rock edge. In November of that same year she released R.U.O.K?!, a mini-album with seven songs. In July 2007, Nanase Aikawa began work on her new album.

Her first music release while working on this album is as part of a limited unit called "Crimson-FANG" for the soundtrack of Kamen Rider Kiva: King of the Castle in the Demon World, having performed on the soundtrack on Kamen Rider Blade in 2004. The single for "Circle of Life", was released on August 6, 2008.

Subsequently, Aikawa released her first digital single off her album Reborn entitled PRISM, which was released May 24, 2008. Her thirty-first single, Yumemiru..., a remix of her debut single Yumemiru Shoujo Ja Irarenai was released January 2009.

Aikawa Nanase released tAttoo, on November 11, 2009.

December 8, 2010, is the release date of "Fine Fine Day," the first single from the "Rockstar Steady" project. A break from her previous image, Rockstar Steady is an all-girl rock band with Aikawa as its singer, and with songs such as "Fine Fine Day" entirely in English . For the music video, Nanase Aikawa went to Paris to work with the fashion film duo of Antoine Asseraf & René Habermacher, who gave the video a lesbian-chic aesthetic.

=== Band members ===
A list of her band for the album R.U.O.K?! and with whom she toured for the album:

- Guitar: Marty Friedman (ex. Megadeth, ex. (Cacophony)
- Guitar: Pata (X Japan, Ra:IN)
- Bass: Crazy Cool Joe (Dead End)
- Drums: Shinya (Luna Sea)
- Keyboards: D.I.E (Ra:IN, ex. hide with Spread Beaver)

== Personal life ==
Aikawa Nanase was married on her twenty-sixth birthday, February 16, 2001 and their first child, a boy, was born on September 6, 2001. Aikawa had their second child, another son, on September 9, 2007. On September 15, 2012, Nanase gave birth to a third child, a baby girl. In the summer of 2025, Aikawa filed for divorce from her husband, stating "It was the choice we made to remain a family".

Aikawa is a good friend (as stated in an interview) of Yumi Yoshimura from Puffy.

== Discography ==
=== Albums ===
- Red (July 3, 1996)
- paraDOX (July 2, 1997)
- Crimson (July 22, 1998)
- I.D. (May 19, 1999) (Compilation) Oricon number 1
- Foxtrot (February 16, 2000) Oricon number 3
- Purãnã (February 21, 2001) Oricon number 7
- The Last Quarter (September 27, 2001) (Mini Album) Oricon number 15
- ID:2 (March 26, 2003) (Compilation) Oricon number 29
- 7 Seven (February 18, 2004) Oricon number 33
- The First Quarter (February 16, 2005) (Mini Album)
- R.U.O.K?! (November 19, 2005) (Mini Album)
- REBORN (February 18, 2009) Oricon number 45
- Gossip (February 11, 2011) (As Rockstar Steady)
- Konjiki (今事紀) (February 6, 2013)
- Treasure Box -Tetsuro Oda Songs- (October 28, 2015) (Cover Album)
- Now or Never (October, 26 2016)
- ROCK GOES ON (June 20, 2018)
- Naka Ima (January 25, 2023)
- Rock Monster (November 8, 2023) (Cover Album) Oricon digital albums chart number 40

=== Mini-Singles ===
- "Yumemiru Shoujou Ja Irarenai" (November 8, 1995) Oricon number 12
- "Bye Bye" (February 9, 1996)
- "Like a Hard Rain" (April 17, 1996) Oricon number 8
- "Break Out!" (June 5, 1996) Oricon number 4
- "Koigokoro" (October 7, 1996)
- "Troublemaker" (Japanese: トラブルメイカー) (February 13, 1997) Oricon number 2
- "Sweet Emotion" (May 1, 1997) Oricon number 2
- "Bad Girls" (November 12, 1997) Oricon number 5
- "Kanojo to Watashi no Jijou" (Japanese: 彼女と私の事情) (February 4, 1998) Oricon number 6
- "Nostalgia" (May 8, 1998) Oricon number 7
- "Lovin' You" (November 6, 1998) Oricon number 8
- "Cosmic Love" (March 17, 1999) Oricon number 6

=== Maxi-Singles ===
- "Sekai Wa Kono Te No Naka Ni/Heat of the night" (July 23, 1999) Oricon number 7
- "Jealousy" (September 29, 1999) Oricon number 8
- "China Rose" (December 8, 1999) Oricon number 13
- "Midnight Blue" (May 31, 2000) Oricon number 10
- "Seven Seas" (August 9, 2000) Oricon number 10
- "No Future" (January 31, 2001) (Zoids: New Century Zero opening theme) Oricon number 15
- "~dandelion~" (January 31, 2001) Oricon number 17
- "Owarinai Yume" (June 5, 2002) (InuYasha third opening theme) Oricon number 14
- "Roppongi Shinjyu" (October 9, 2002) Oricon number 10
- "Shock of Love" (February 13, 2003) Oricon number 39
- "R-Shitei" (November 27, 2003) Oricon number 37
- "Ai no Uta -Magenta Rain-" (January 21, 2004)
- "Round ZERO ～ BLADE BRAVE" (February 18, 2004) (Kamen Rider Blade first opening theme) Oricon number 11
- "Mangekyo/UNLIMITED" (September 29, 2004) (Samurai 7 first opening theme) Oricon number 49
- "Kagiriaru Hibiki" (January 19, 2005)
- "EVERYBODY GOES" (February 25, 2006) (Madan Senki Ryukendo first ending theme)
- "PRISM" (May 24, 2008) (Digital Single)
- "tAttoo" (November 11, 2009)
- "Ai ga Tomaranai" (September 29, 2010)
- "Hikarinomi" (October 31, 2012)
- "Sakura Maioriru Koro, Namidairo" (March 5, 2014)
- "Across" (July 6, 2016)
- "Mangetsu ni SHOUT!" (August 26, 2015)

== Theme songs ==
- "No Future" – Zoids: New Century Zero opening theme
- "Owarinai Yume" – InuYasha third opening theme
- "Unlimited" – Samurai 7 opening theme
- "Round ZERO ~ BLADE BRAVE" – Kamen Rider Blade first opening theme
- "EVERYBODY GOES" – Madan Senki Ryukendo ending theme
- "Love Terrorist" – Heavy Metal Thunder OST
- "Circle of Life" with Crimson-FANG – Kamen Rider Kiva: King of the Castle in the Demon World theme song
- "Yumemiru.." – K-tai Investigator 7 third ending theme
